= Aachen (district) =

Coordinates: 50°45′N 6°15′E

- District
- Flag Coat of arms
- Country: Germany
- State: North Rhine-Westphalia
- Adm. region: Cologne
- Capital: Aachen

Government
  - District admin.: Tim Grüttemeier (CDU)

Area
  - Total: 707.15 km^{2} (273.03 sq mi)

Population (31 December 2025)
  - Total: 583,325
  - Density: 824.90/km^{2} (2,136.5/sq mi)
- Time zone: UTC+01:00 (CET)
  - Summer (DST): UTC+02:00 (CEST)
- Vehicle registration: AC, MON
- Website: www.staedteregion-aachen.de

The district of Aachen (German: Städteregion Aachen) is a special form of municipal association (German: Kommunalverband besonderer Art) in the west of North Rhine-Westphalia, Germany, at the triple border of Germany, the Netherlands and Belgium. Neighbouring districts are Heinsberg, Düren and Euskirchen, along with the Dutch province of Limburg and the Belgian province of Liège. The administrative seat is Aachen.

The Städteregion Aachen was established on 21 October 2009 as the legal successor to the former Kreis Aachen, which was dissolved on the same date. The nine municipalities of the former district and the city of Aachen together form the Städteregion, with a total population of 582,463 over an area of 707.15 km². It is the first regional model of its kind in North Rhine-Westphalia; precedents exist in Lower Saxony with the Region Hannover and in the Saarland with the Regionalverband Saarbrücken. The city of Aachen holds a special legal position within the structure, with powers slightly less than those of a district-free city (Kreisfreie Stadt). The district's administrative body is the Städteregionstag (regional parliament), headed by the Städteregionsrat Dr. Tim Grüttemeier (CDU) since 2019.

== History ==
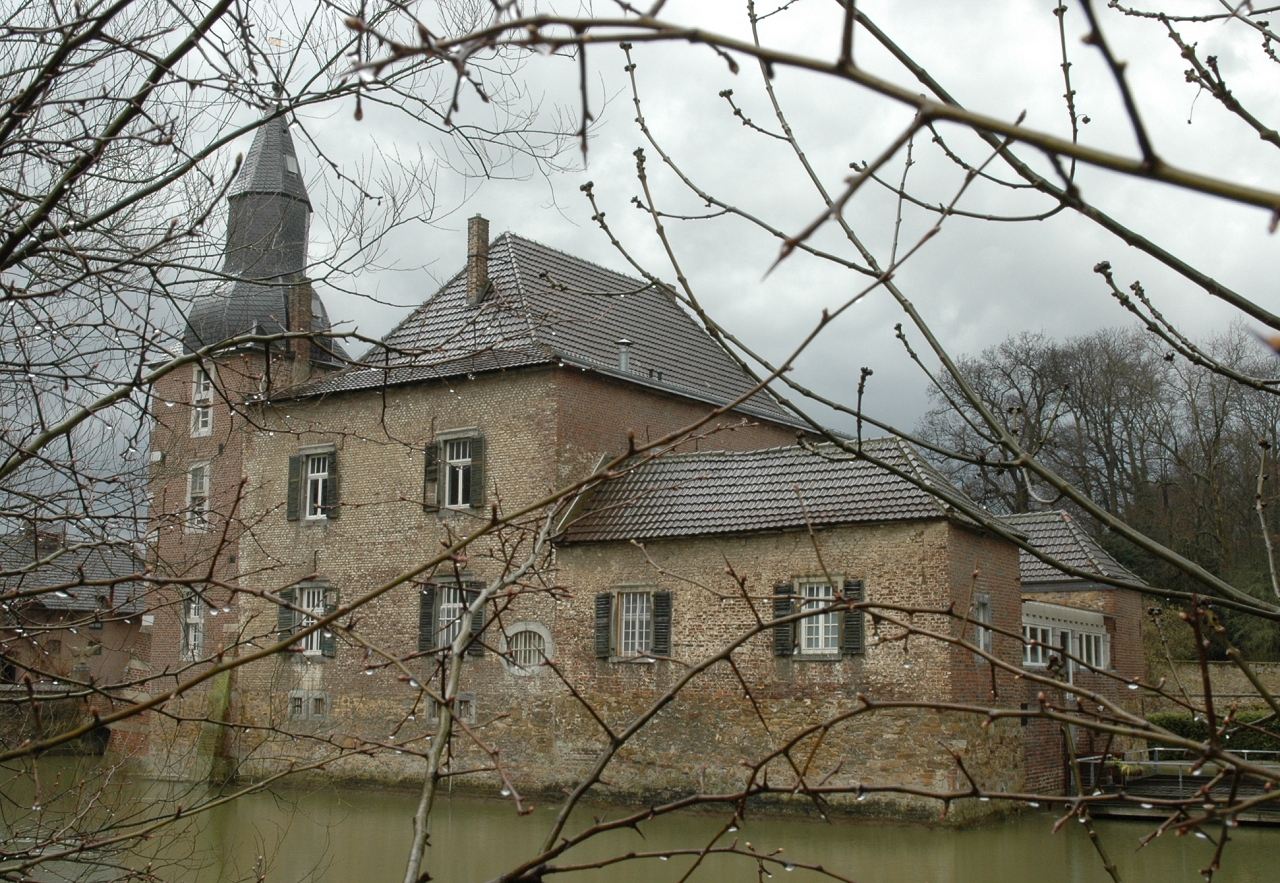
Haus Kambach, a water castle in Eschweiler

=== Landkreis Aachen (1816–2009) ===
The Landkreis Aachen was formed on 24 April 1816 from the two former French cantons of Burtscheid and Eschweiler, with its administrative seat in the town of Burtscheid. Burtscheid was incorporated into the city of Aachen on 1 April 1897, but the administrative seat remained on what was now Aachen's territory.

The district was substantially re-formed in 1972 as part of a wider municipal reorganisation in North Rhine-Westphalia. In 1975 it was enlarged further through the merger of the former district of Monschau and parts of the former districts of Düren, Jülich, Schleiden and Selfkant.

In the cases of the independent cities of Bielefeld (1973) and Münster (1975), the districts named after them were dissolved and several communities incorporated into the respective large city. No comparable reform was carried out in Aachen's case, leaving city and district as separate administrative entities.

=== Zweckverband (2004–2009) ===
In 2004, the Lord Mayor of Aachen Jürgen Linden and County Administrator Carl Meulenbergh agreed to establish a special-purpose association (German: Zweckverband) encompassing the city of Aachen, the Kreis Aachen and its nine municipalities; the association became effective in 2005. An assembly of 60 voting representatives focused on cooperative tasks in road traffic management, school administration and economic development.

=== Städteregion Aachen (2009–present) ===
By state law (the Aachen-Gesetz of 2008), the North Rhine-Westphalia state parliament dissolved the Kreis Aachen and established the Städteregion Aachen as a new form of municipal association with effect from 21 October 2009. The new body took over tasks from its constituent municipalities including traffic planning and emergency services from the cities within it.

In 2012, the Städteregion Aachen joined the districts of Düren, Euskirchen and Heinsberg to form the Region Aachen special-purpose association for structural development and cross-border cooperation.

== Geography ==
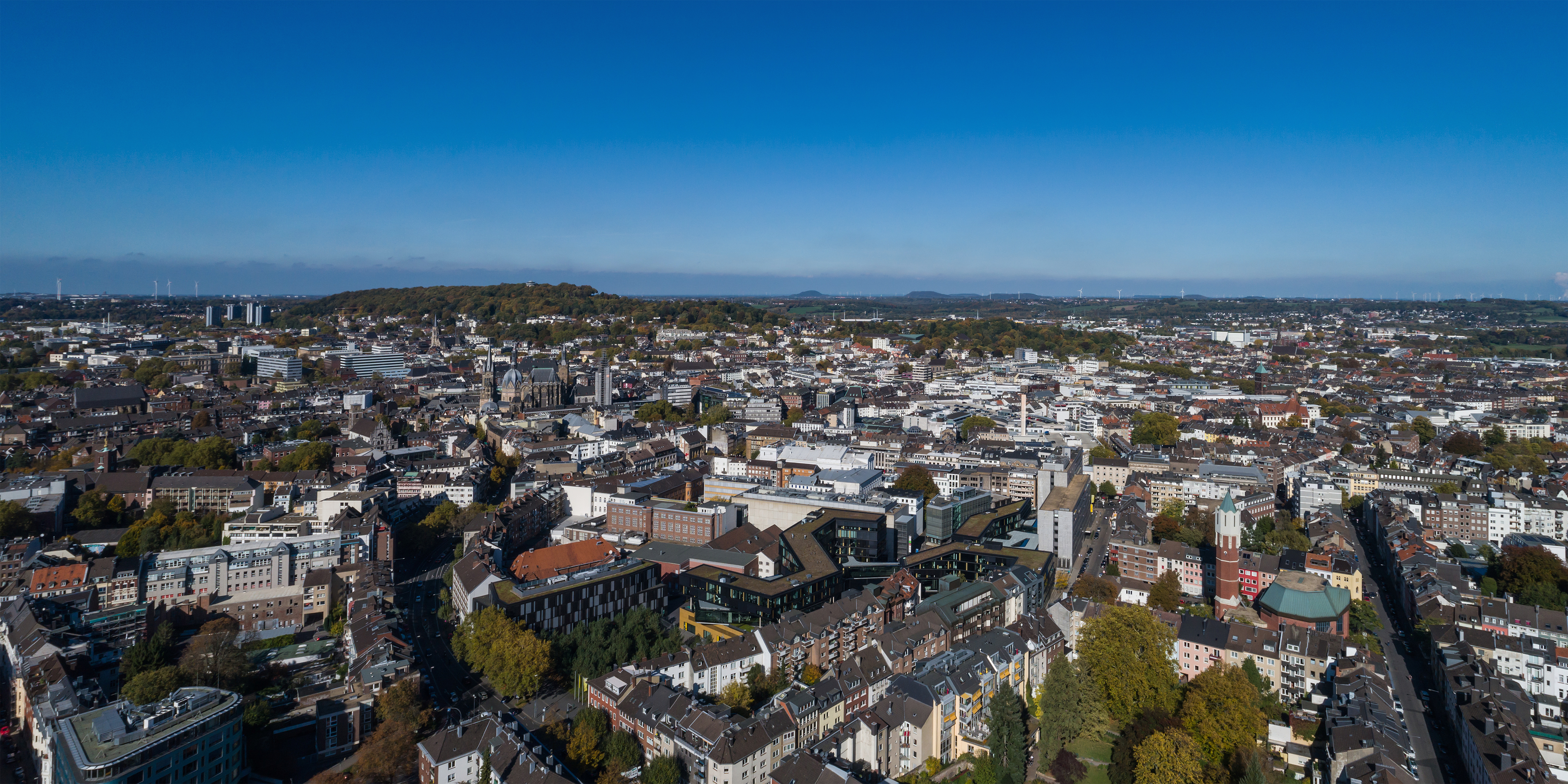
Aerial view of Aachen

The Städteregion Aachen stretches approximately 50 km from Baesweiler in the north to Monschau in the south. The northern and eastern parts lie in the lowland landscape of the Lower Rhine Bay, while the southern portion extends into the Eifel uplands. The High Fens–Eifel Nature Park covers the southern part of the region, and portions of the Eifel National Park lie within the boundaries of Monschau and Simmerath.

The highest point within the district is the Steling at 658.3 m above sea level, at whose foot lies the village of Mützenich, part of Monschau.

=== Borders ===
The district borders (clockwise from the north) the districts of Heinsberg, Düren and Euskirchen, to the south and west the Belgian province of Liège, and to the west the Dutch province of Limburg with the Parkstad Limburg urban region.

Border lengths of the Städteregion Aachen
| With Belgium: | 67.7 km |
| With the Netherlands: | 31.5 km |
| With Heinsberg district: | 14.6 km |
| With Düren district: | 95.4 km |
| With Euskirchen district: | 19.3 km |
| Total: | 228.5 km |

=== Waterways ===
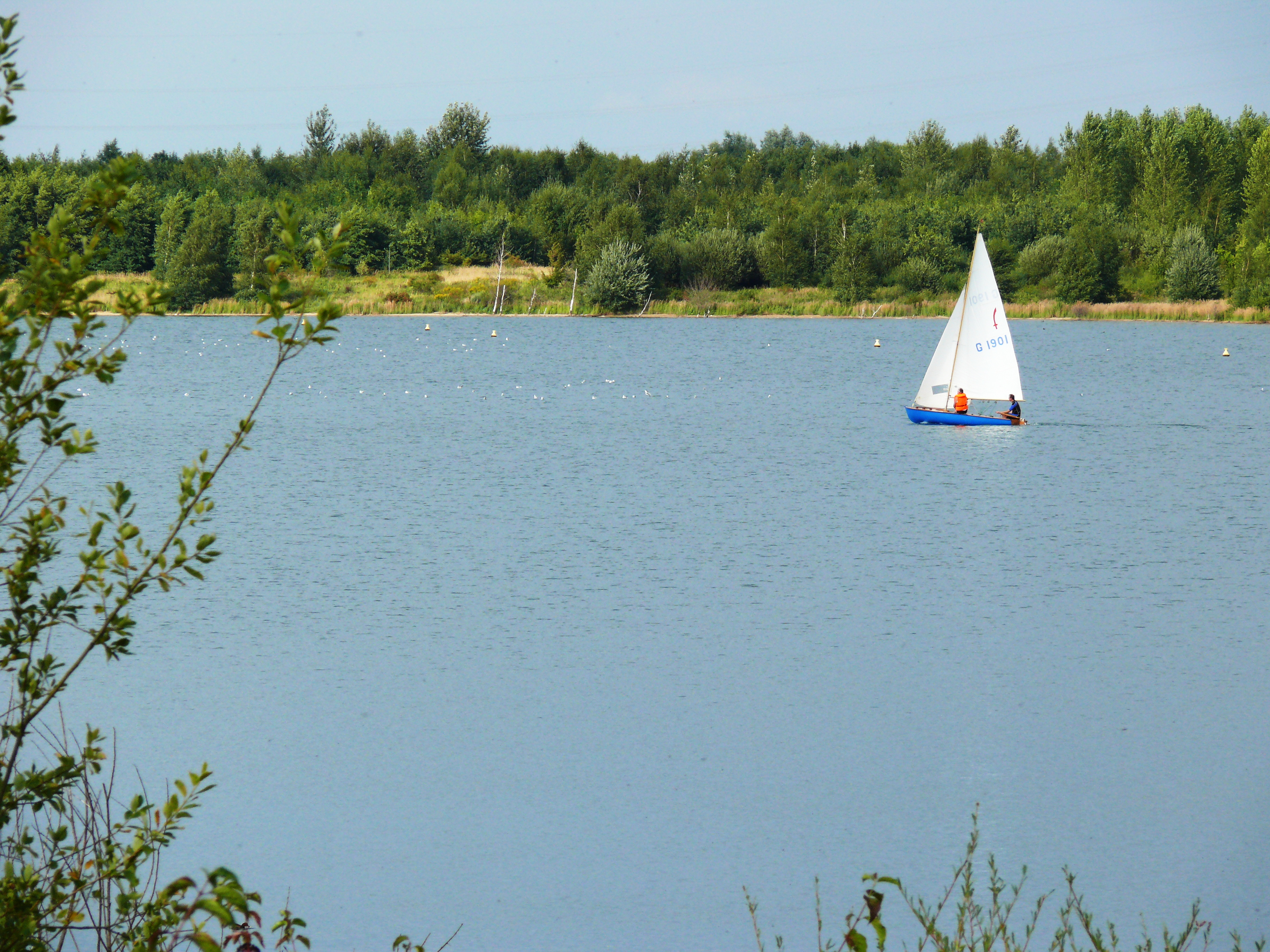
Blausteinsee

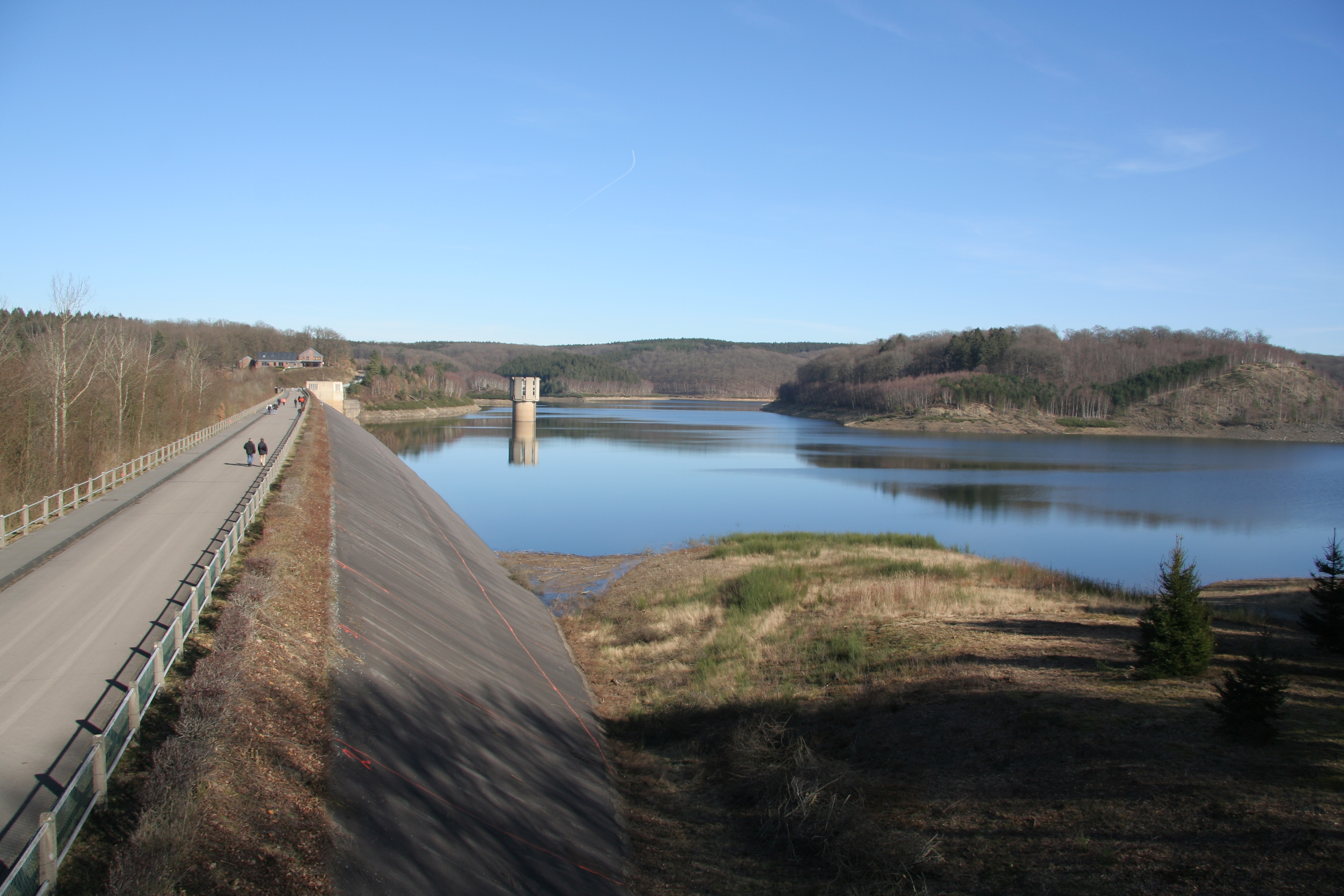
Wehebachtalsperre

Rivers flowing through the region include the Broichbach, Inde, Kall, Merzbach, Omerbach, Pau, Rur, Saubach, Vicht, Wehe and Wurm.

Bodies of water within the region include the Blausteinsee, Dreilägerbachtalsperre, Kalltalsperre, Perlenbachtalsperre, the Rurtalsperre together with its upper reservoir, and the Wehebachtalsperre.

=== Towns and municipalities ===
Clickable map of towns and municipalities in the district

The Städteregion comprises ten municipalities, of which eight hold the Stadt (town) title. Aachen is a large city (Großstadt) with more than 100,000 inhabitants; six further towns have between 25,000 and 59,999 residents. Roetgen and Simmerath are the two municipalities without town status.

| Municipality | Status | Area (km²) | Population (2023) |
|---|---|---|---|
| Aachen | Large regional city (special status) | 160.85 | 260,454 |
| Alsdorf | Regional town | 31.68 | 48,518 |
| Baesweiler | Regional town | 36.20 | 28,063 |
| Eschweiler | Regional town | 75.75 | 57,439 |
| Herzogenrath | Regional town | 32.57 | 47,802 |
| Monschau | Regional town | 144.72 | 12,030 |
| Roetgen | Municipality | 57.08 | 9,183 |
| Simmerath | Municipality | 112.48 | 15,271 |
| Stolberg | Regional town | 108.71 | 57,688 |
| Würselen | Regional town | 38.76 | 40,866 |
| Total | Städteregion Aachen | 707.15 | 582,463 |

The district is broadly divided into four areas:

- the Nordkreis (Alsdorf, Baesweiler, Herzogenrath, Würselen) in the north
- the city of Aachen in the west, with special administrative status
- the Raum Eschweiler-Stolberg in the east
- the Südkreis (Monschau, Roetgen, Simmerath) in the south

Towns
Municipalities
1. Aachen
2. Alsdorf
3. Baesweiler
4. Eschweiler
5. Herzogenrath
6. Monschau
7. Stolberg
8. Würselen
1. Roetgen
2. Simmerath

== Coat of arms ==
Logo of the Städteregion Aachen

Coat of arms

The Städteregion Aachen uses the coat of arms of the former Kreis Aachen, approved for continued use by the regional government president on 28 May 2009. It was designed by Wolfgang Pagenstecher.

Blazon: On a blue field, a golden deer antler with a silver swan perched on top (the swan with black feet, black beak and red tongue); above in the shield head, on a gold field, a walking black lion with red tongue.

The black lion in the upper part (the Jülich lion) represents the Duchy of Jülich, as the great majority of the district was formerly Jülich territory. The swan on the deer antler in the lower blue field stands for the former Reichsabtei Burtscheid and the old town of Burtscheid, on whose former territory the district administration stands; Burtscheid was incorporated into Aachen in 1897, so the emblem also establishes a connection to the city of Aachen. The same walking lion appears in the coat of arms of Eschweiler, whose canton formed the eastern half of the Prussian Landkreis Aachen.

Swan on antler in the Burtscheid coat of arms

Jülich lion in the Eschweiler coat of arms

Coat of arms of the Städteregion

== Demographics ==
According to the 2011 census, 55.9% of residents were Roman Catholic, 14.3% Protestant and 29.8% had no religious affiliation or belonged to other communities. By the 2022 census the Catholic share had fallen to 44.3%, the Protestant share to 12.0%, and 43.7% had no affiliation, belonged to another religious community or gave no answer.

According to statistics of the Diocese of Aachen, the Catholic share of the total population fell by 1.7 percentage points in 2023, by 2.5 percentage points in 2024, and by 2.4 percentage points in 2025.

== Politics ==
=== Regional parliament ===
The 2025 municipal elections produced the following results for the regional parliament (Städteregionstag). Voter turnout was 59.1%.

| Party | % 2025 | Seats 2025 | % 2020 | Seats 2020 |
|---|---|---|---|---|
| CDU | 36.7 | 27 | 31.9 | – |
| SPD | 19.8 | 15 | 25.1 | – |
| Greens | 16.1 | 12 | 24.6 | – |
| AfD | 12.8 | 9 | 3.8 | – |
| Die Linke | 5.7 | 4 | 3.7 | – |
| FDP | 3.1 | 2 | 5.0 | – |
| Volt | 2.1 | 2 | – | – |
| Die PARTEI | 1.6 | 1 | 2.1 | – |
| BSW | 1.1 | 1 | – | – |
| UFW (Free Voters) | 0.9 | 1 | 1.0 | – |
| Total | 100.0 | 74 | 100.0 | – |

=== Städteregionsrat ===
The Städteregionsrat is the head of the district administration, directly elected for a five-year term. Dr. Tim Grüttemeier (CDU) has held the post since 2019; he was re-elected at the 2025 municipal election in a runoff with 62.5% of the vote against Janine Köster (SPD).

Previous officeholders:

- Helmut Etschenberg (CDU): 2009–2018
- Dr. Tim Grüttemeier (CDU): since 2019

== Economy ==
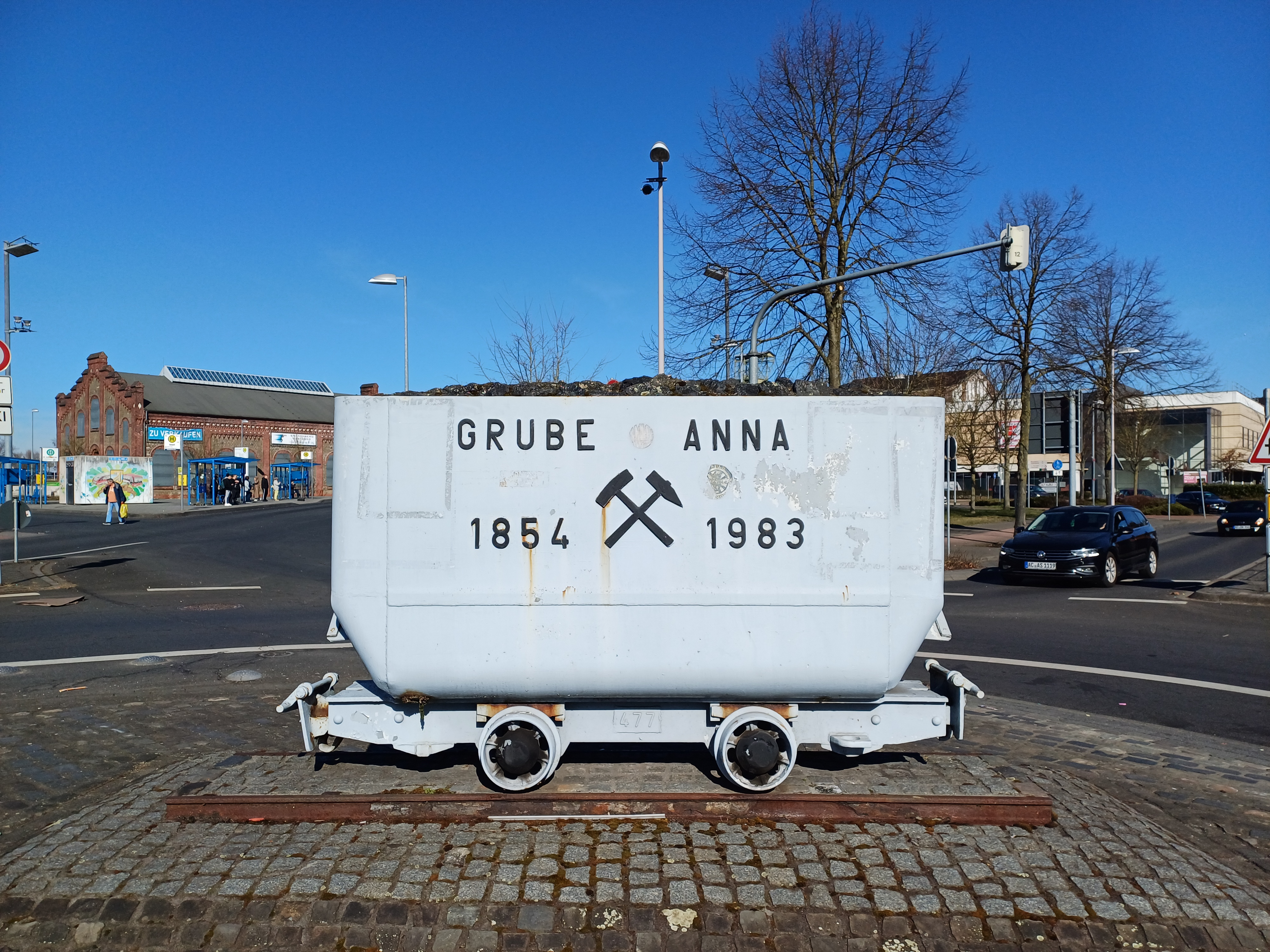
Mining heritage at Alsdorf

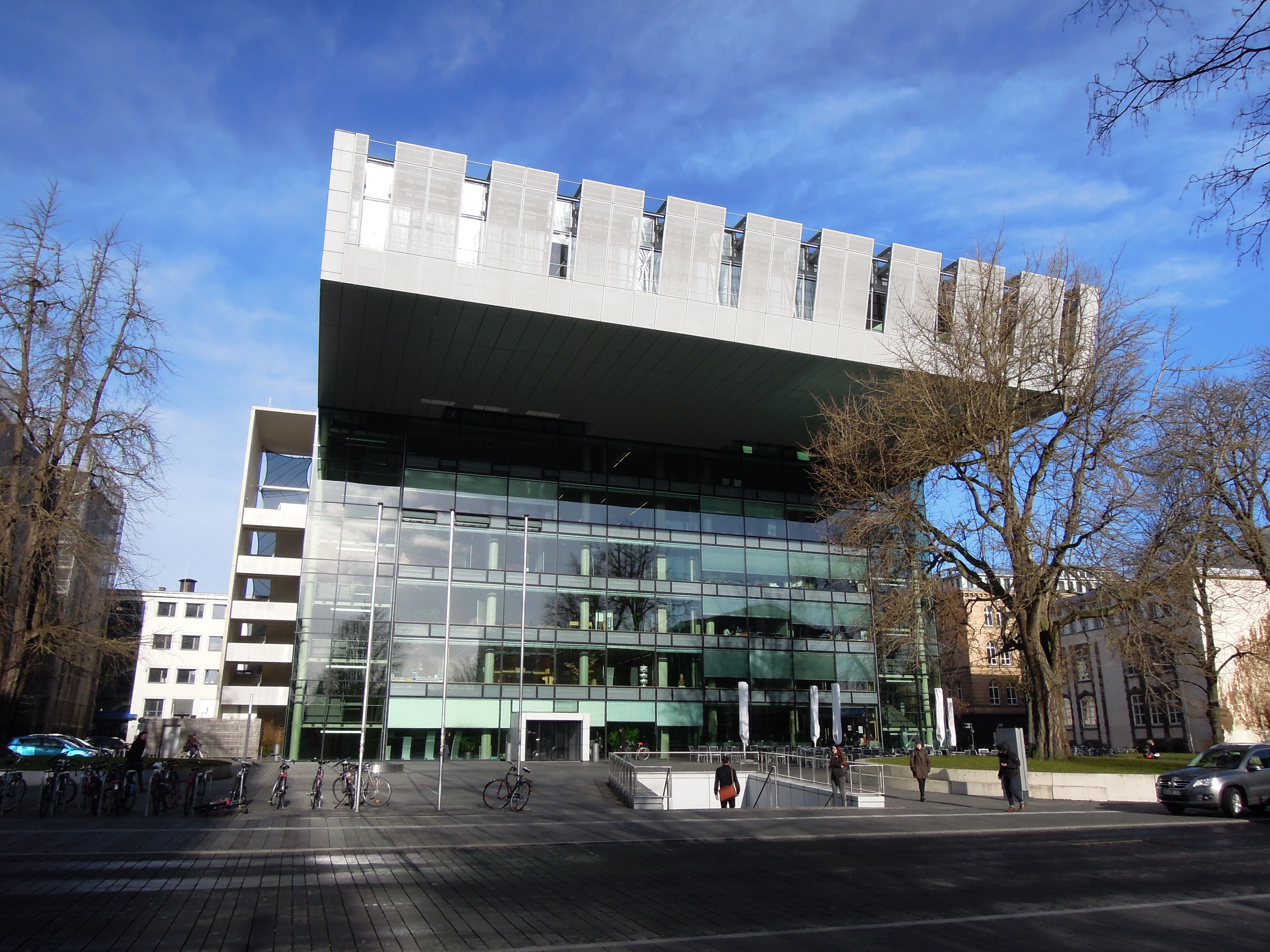
SuperC of RWTH Aachen University

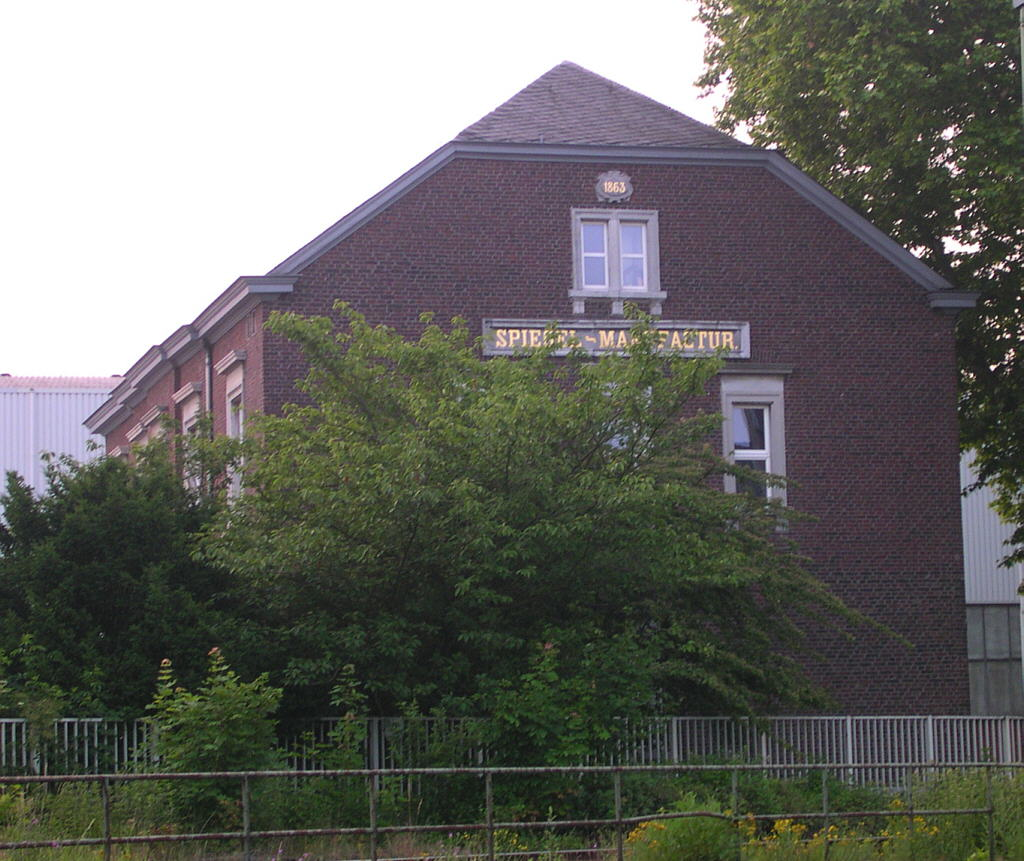
Mirror manufacture in Stolberg

In 2016, the region's GDP was €20.537 billion, placing it 16th among German cities and districts by economic output. GDP per capita stood at €37,124, close to the North Rhine-Westphalia average of €37,416 and slightly below the national figure of €38,180. Around 301,300 people were employed in the Städteregion in 2017. The unemployment rate in December 2018 was 6.5%, slightly above the North Rhine-Westphalia average of 6.4%.

The district divides into four distinct economic areas. The northern Nordkreis (Alsdorf, Baesweiler, Herzogenrath, Würselen), covering the former Wurmrevier, has traditional glass, needle and food industries alongside newer technology-oriented companies. The southern Südkreis (Monschau, Roetgen, Simmerath) forms part of the High Fens–Eifel Nature Park and the Eifel National Park, and the Rurtalsperre reservoir makes it the region's main tourist destination.

Between north and south lies the Raum Eschweiler-Stolberg, the former Inderevier, where both the Thyssen and Hoesch industrial dynasties had their roots. Glass, plastics and metalworking firms operate here alongside chemical and pharmaceutical companies. Stolberg is known as the world's oldest brass city, owing to its historic copper court buildings (Kupferhöfe); Eschweiler earned the nickname "cradle of Rhineland mining" through the Eschweiler Bergwerks-Verein, founded in 1834. Shared mineral resources include hard coal, lignite, zinc and other ores. The industrial past left environmental legacies including the Gressenicher Krankheit (Gressenich disease) and the Bleikinder (lead children) episode. Stolberg's territory also contains the unique Galmeiflora plant community, which developed on the zinc-rich soils of former mining sites.

Aachen forms the fourth economic zone. Traditionally specialising in needle and cloth manufacture, it is today a leading research and business location centred on RWTH Aachen University and the FH Aachen, with numerous affiliated companies and research centres.

=== Notable entrepreneurs and families ===
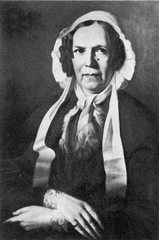
Christine Englerth (1767–1838), who established the Eschweiler Bergwerks-Verein, the first mining joint-stock company in Prussia

Industrialists and entrepreneur families associated with the region include James Cockerill, the Englerth family, the Hoesch family, Henry Joseph Napoléon Lambertz, the Prym family, William Prym, August Thyssen, Friedrich Thyssen and Barthold Suermondt.

=== Hospitals ===
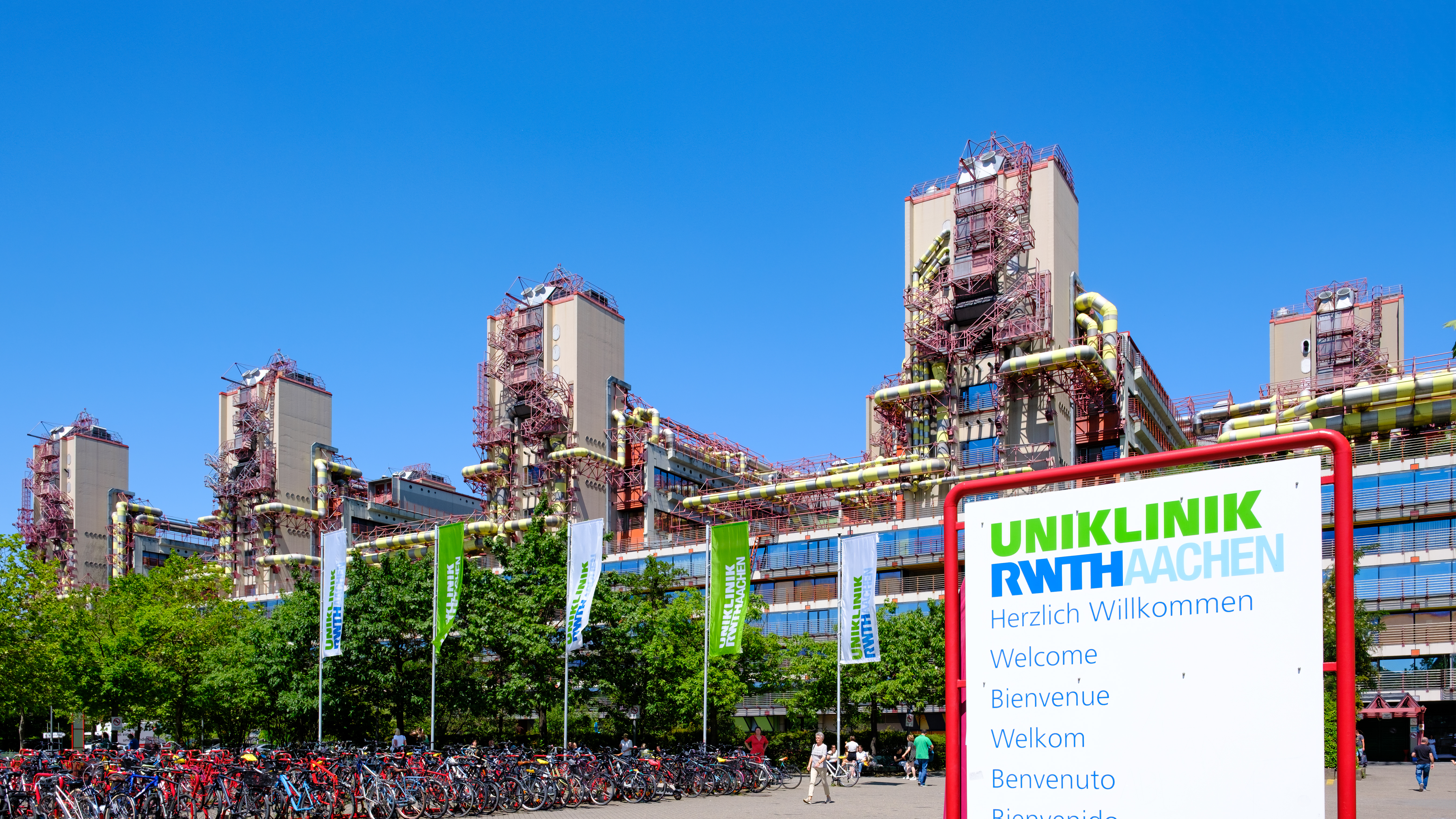
Aachen University Hospital

Hospitals in the region include:

- Aachen: Alexianer-Krankenhaus, Franziskushospital, Luisenhospital, Marienhospital, Universitätsklinikum Aachen
- Eschweiler: St.-Antonius-Hospital
- Simmerath: Eifelklinik St. Brigida
- Stolberg: Bethlehem Gesundheitszentrum
- Würselen: Rhein-Maas Klinikum

== Culture ==
Annual events in the region include CHIO Aachen (equestrian sport), the Monschau Marathon, the Charlemagne Prize ceremony, the Eschweiler Music Festival, Öcher Bend and the Jungenspiele. The Eschweiler Rose Monday parade is the third-longest in Germany; the city of Aachen is home to the Order Against Animal Seriousness. The Aachen Christmas Market and the Monschau Christmas market are among the region's most visited seasonal events.

=== Sights ===
The Aachen Cathedral, a UNESCO World Heritage Site, is the region's most prominent monument. Like the Aachen Town Hall, it traces its origins to the Palatine Chapel built by Charlemagne. The region is rich in castles, manor houses and fortifications from multiple periods.

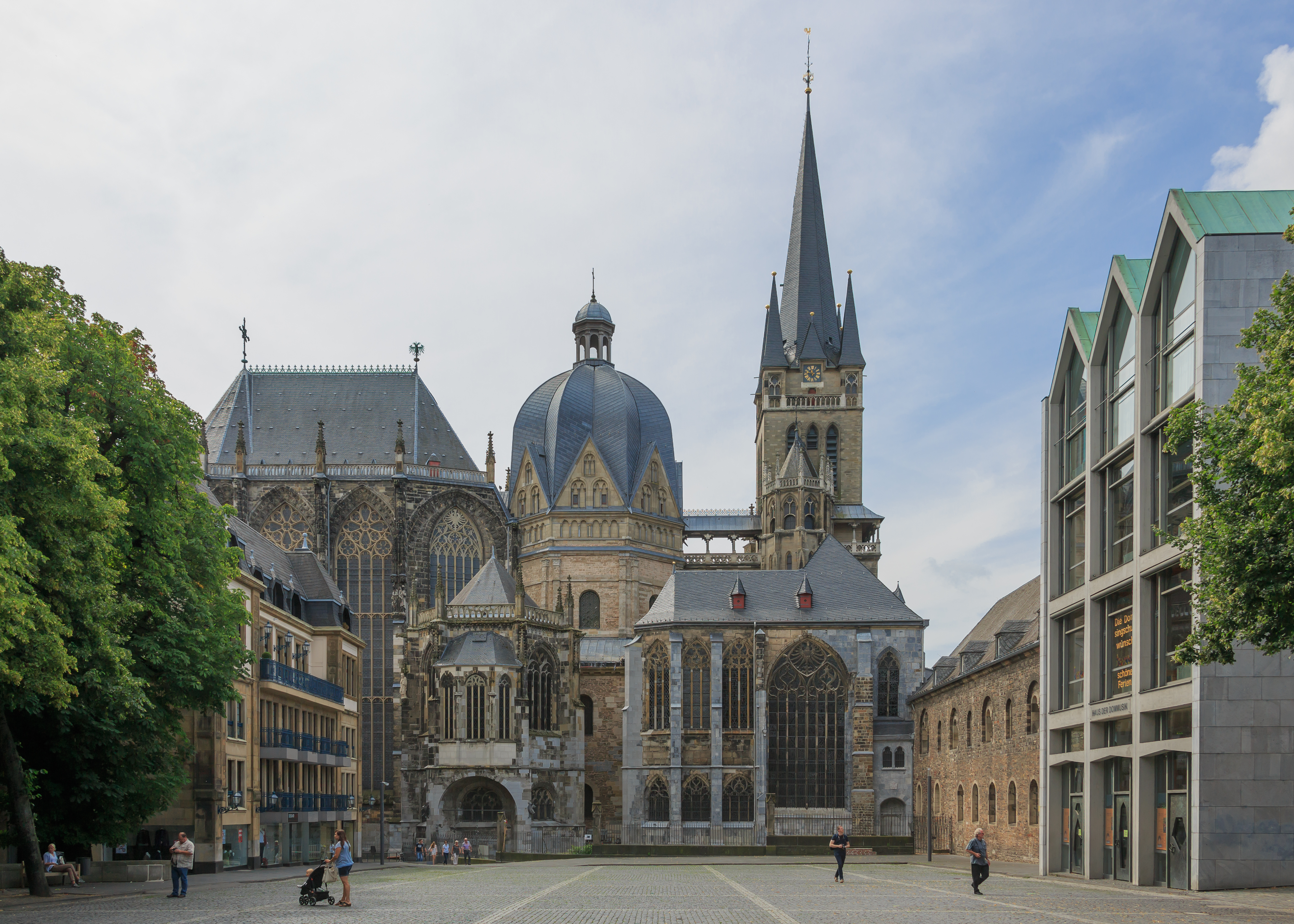
Aachen Cathedral, a UNESCO World Heritage Site

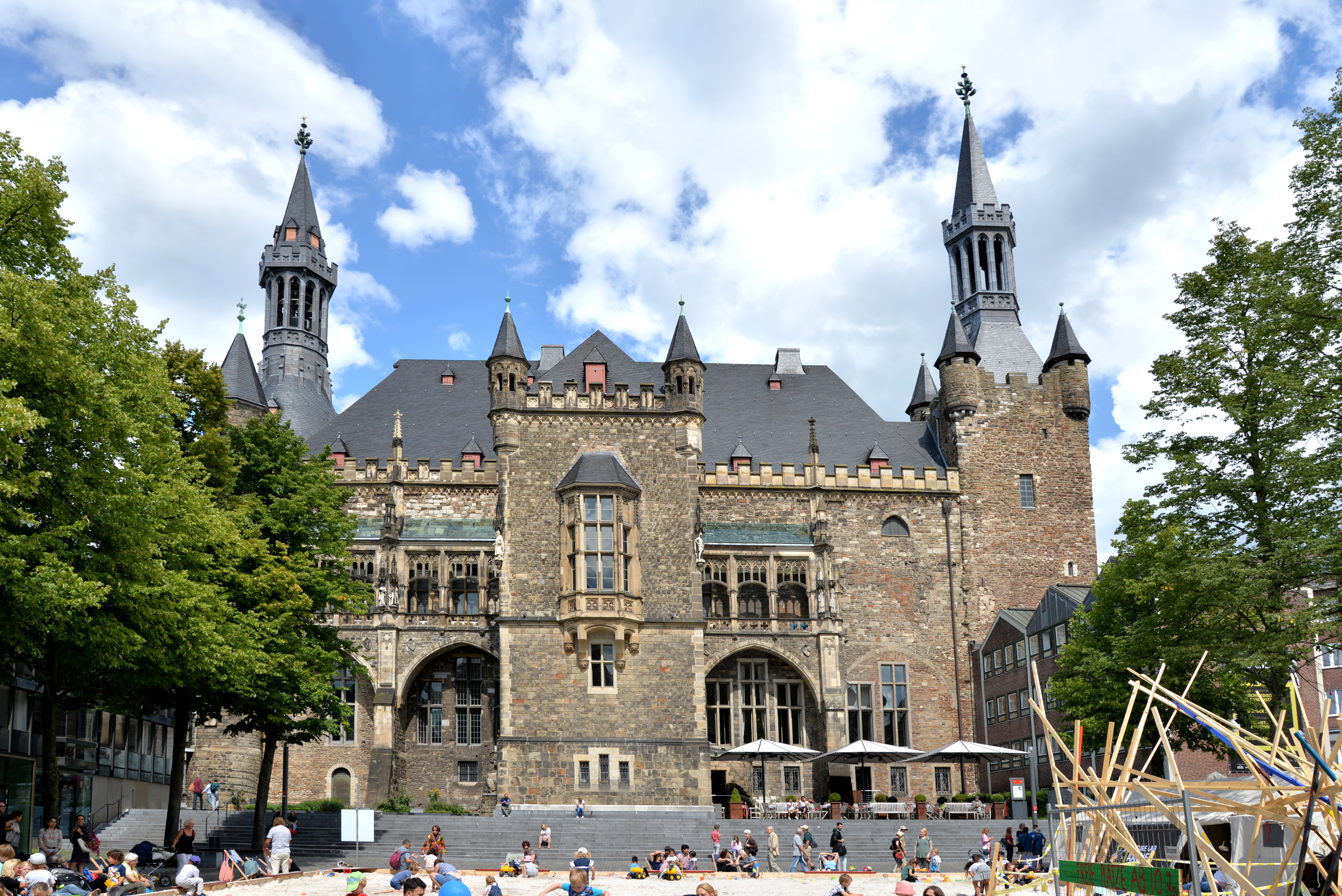
Aachen Town Hall

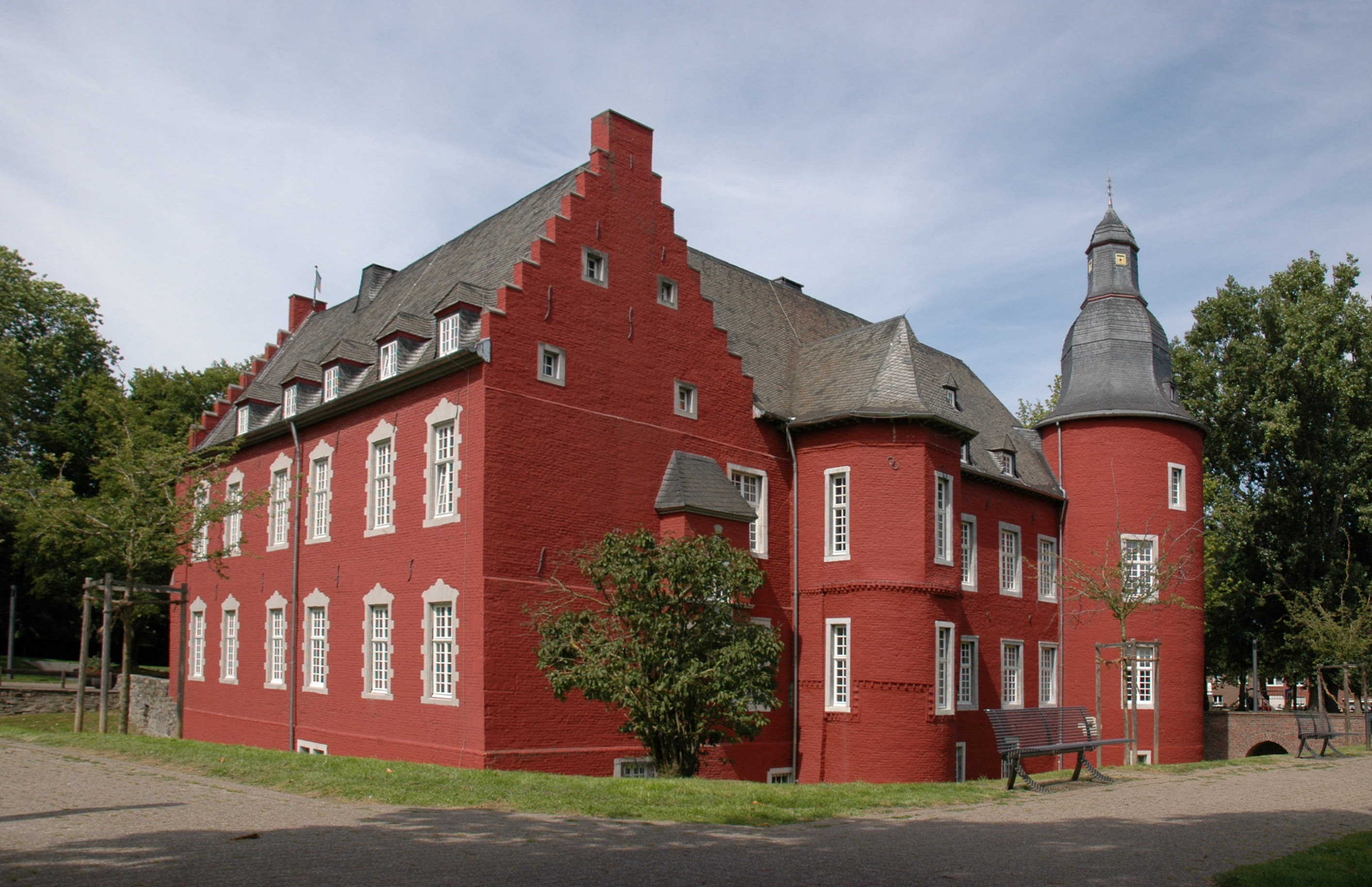
Alsdorf Castle, a former moated castle in Alsdorf

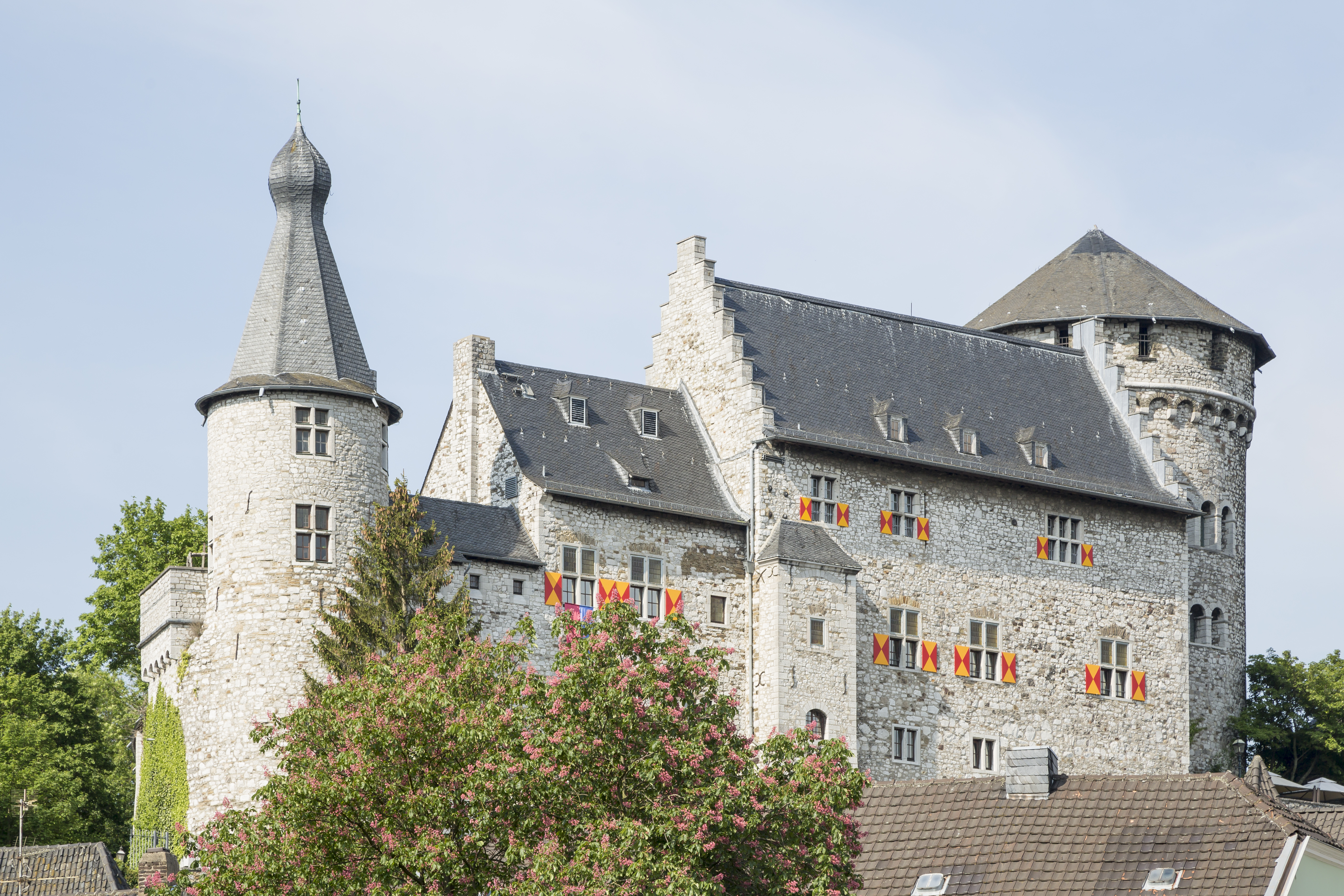
Stolberg Castle

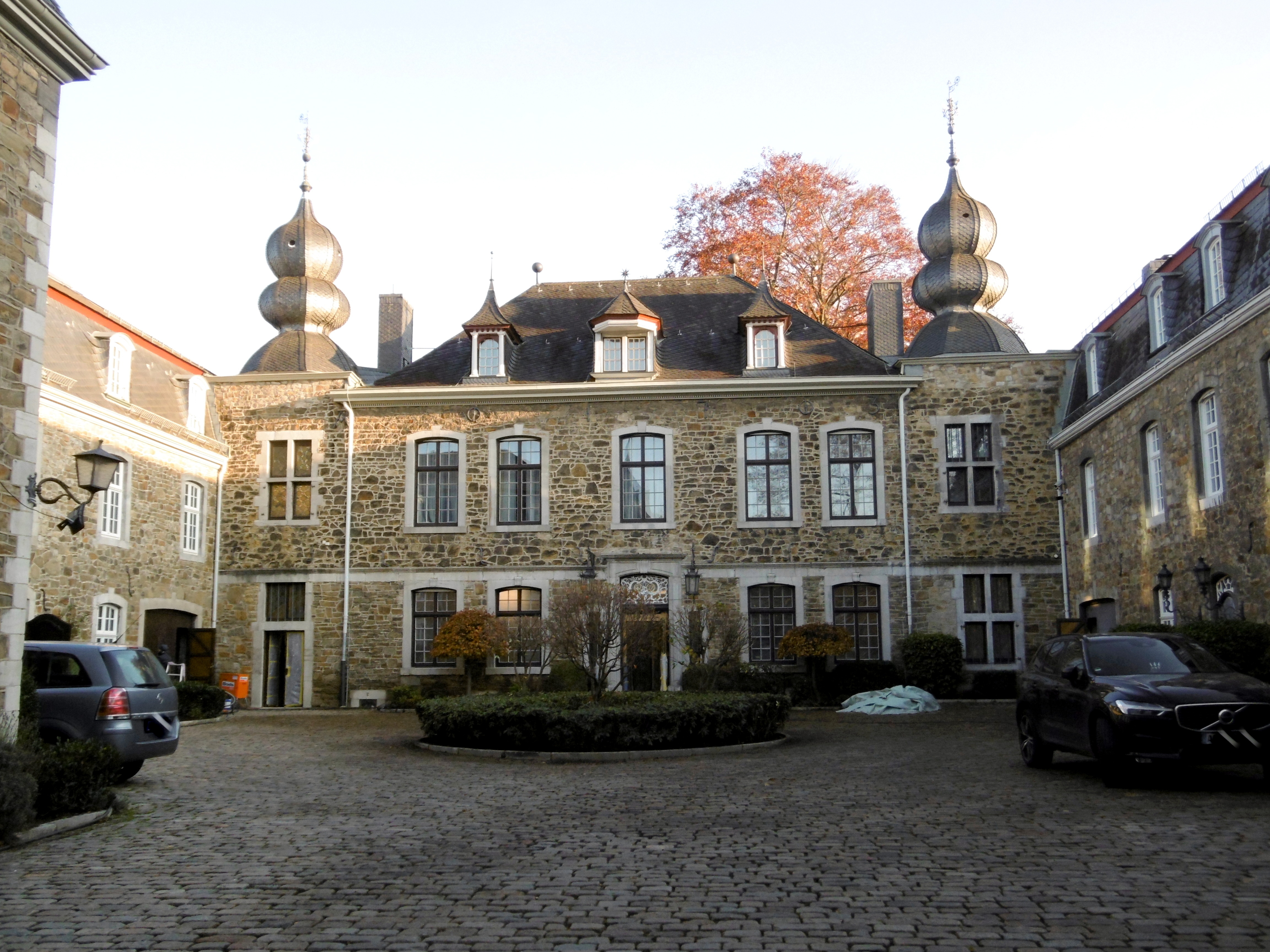
Kupferhof Grünenthal, Stolberg

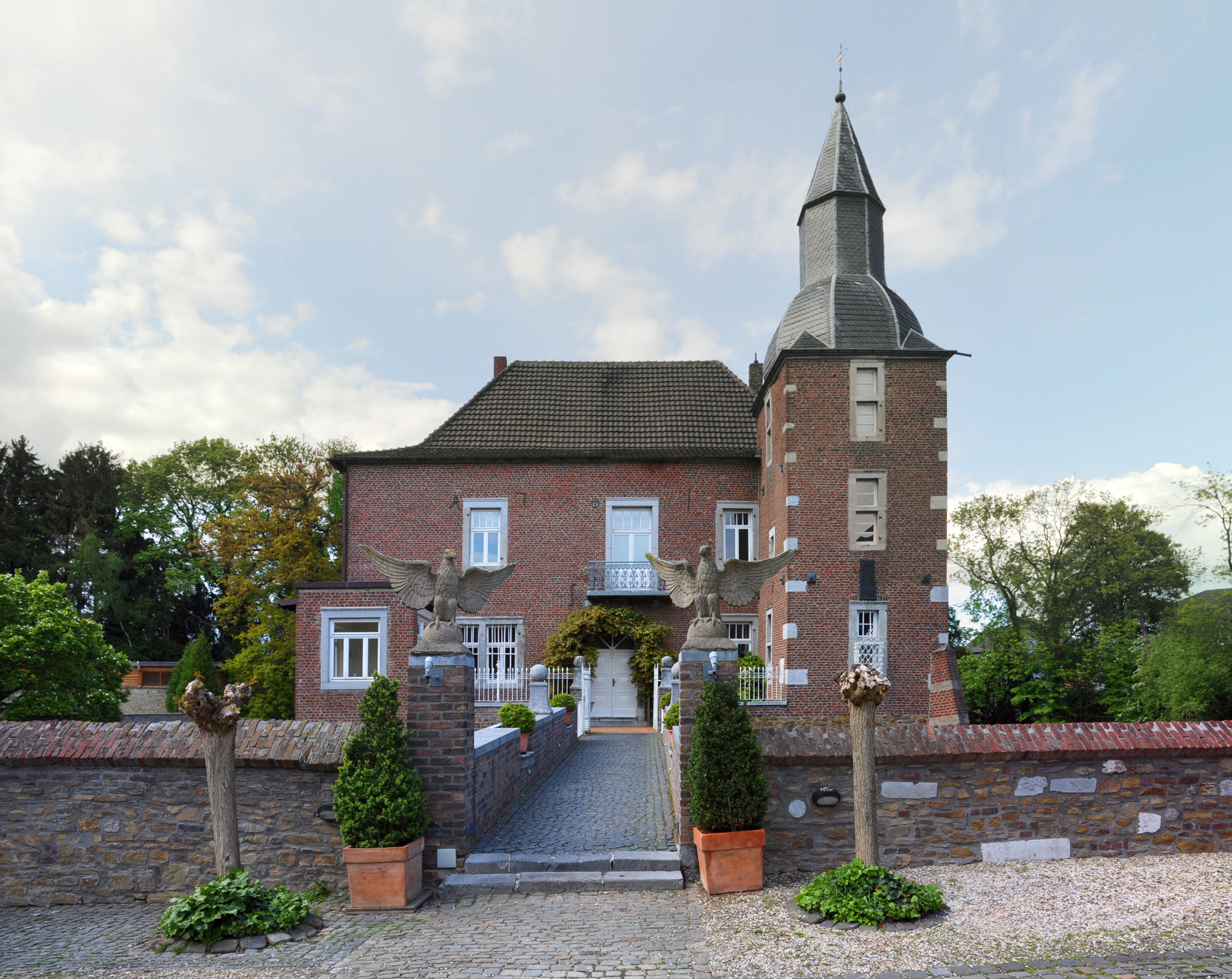
Haus Kambach, Eschweiler

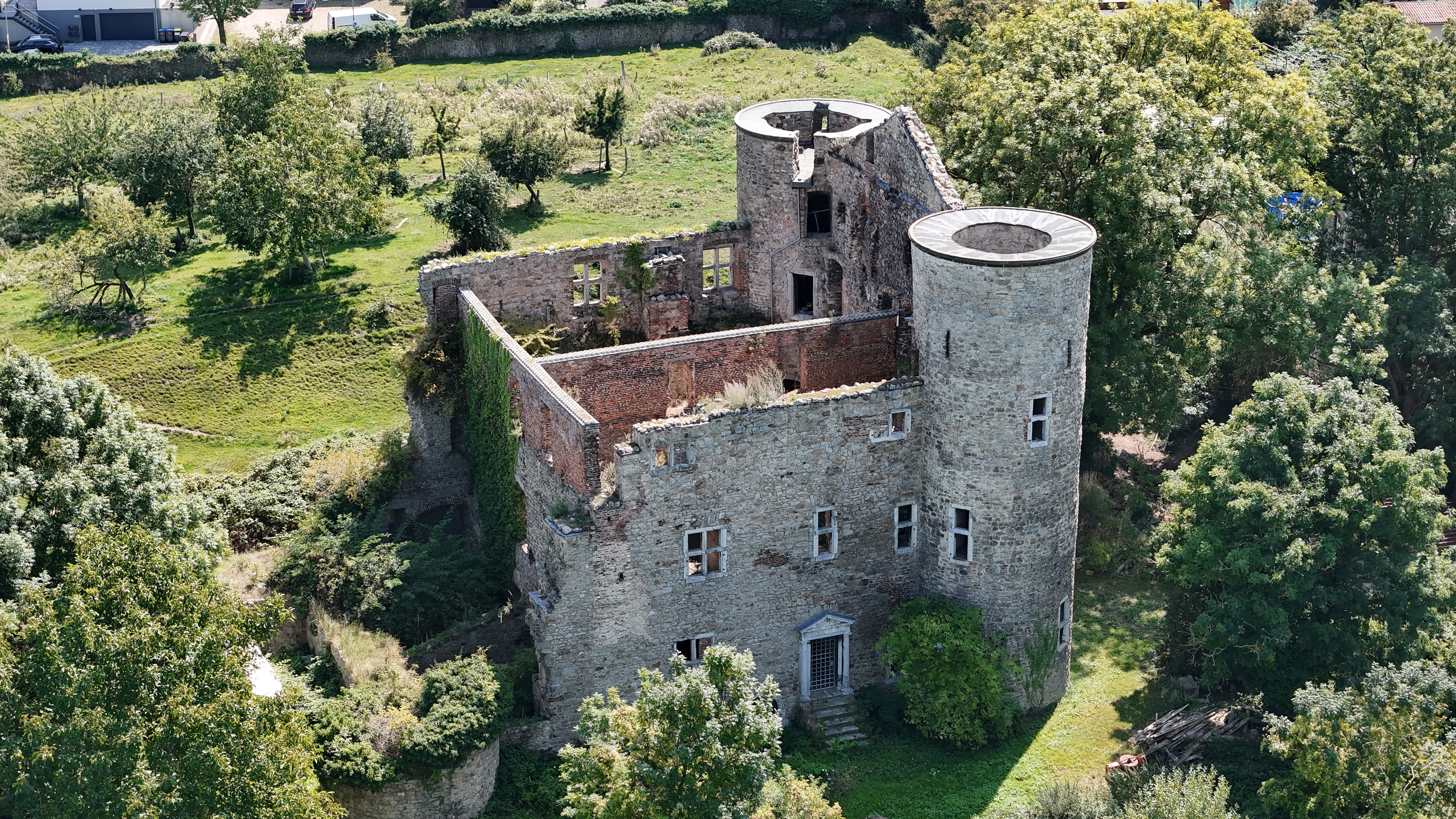
Nothberger Burg, Eschweiler

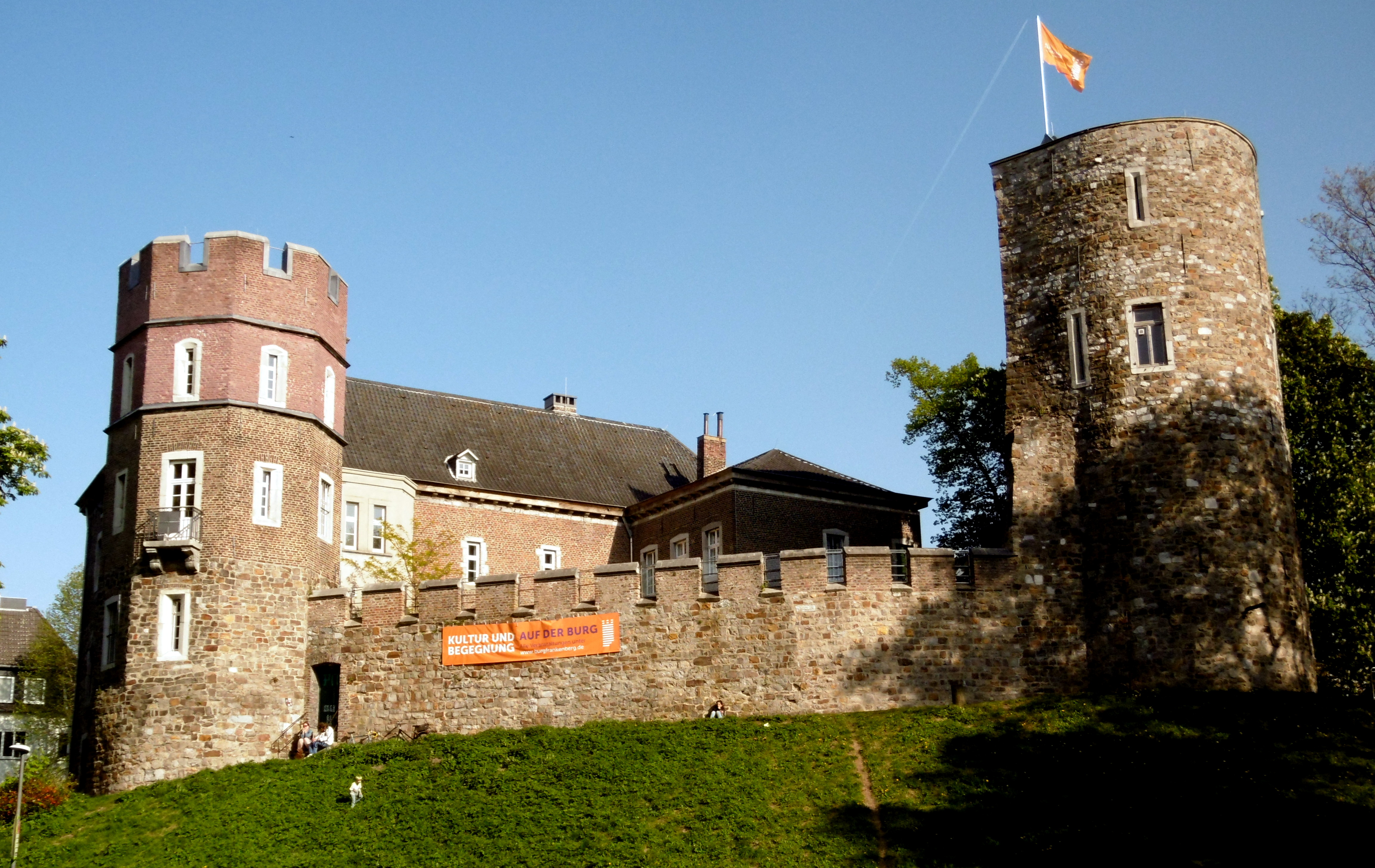
Frankenberg Castle, Aachen

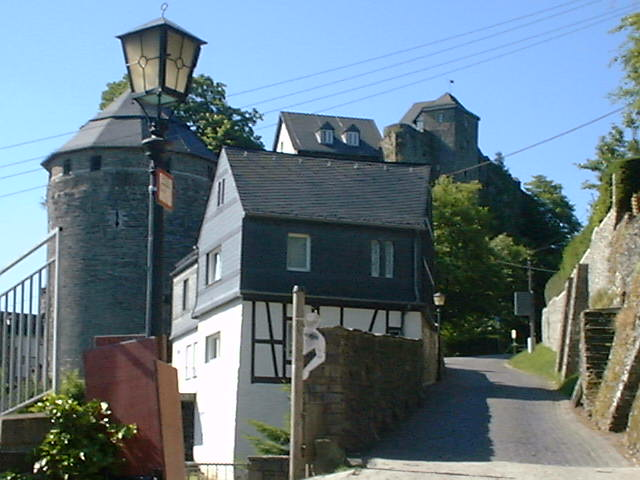
Monschau Castle

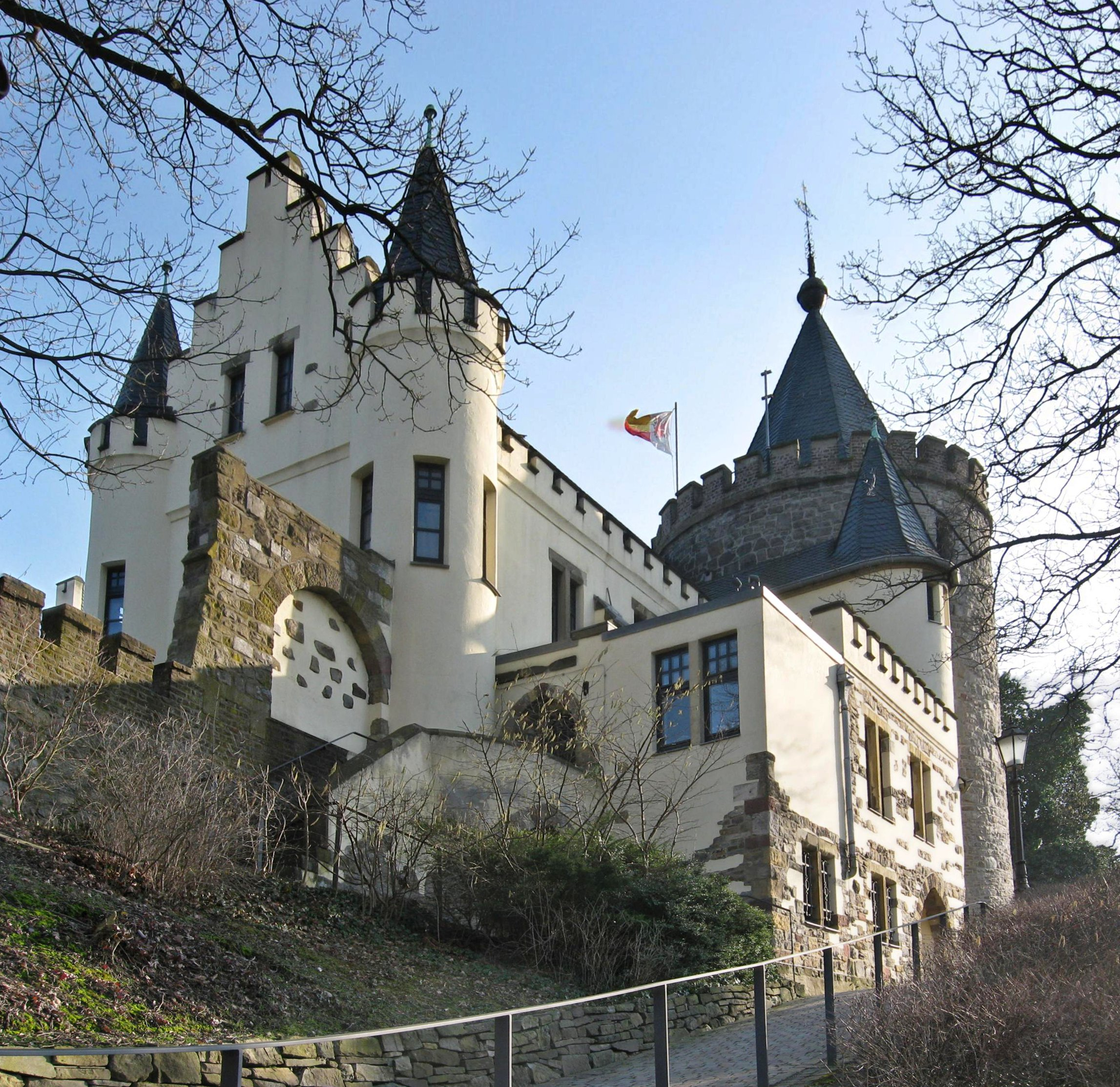
Rode Castle, Herzogenrath

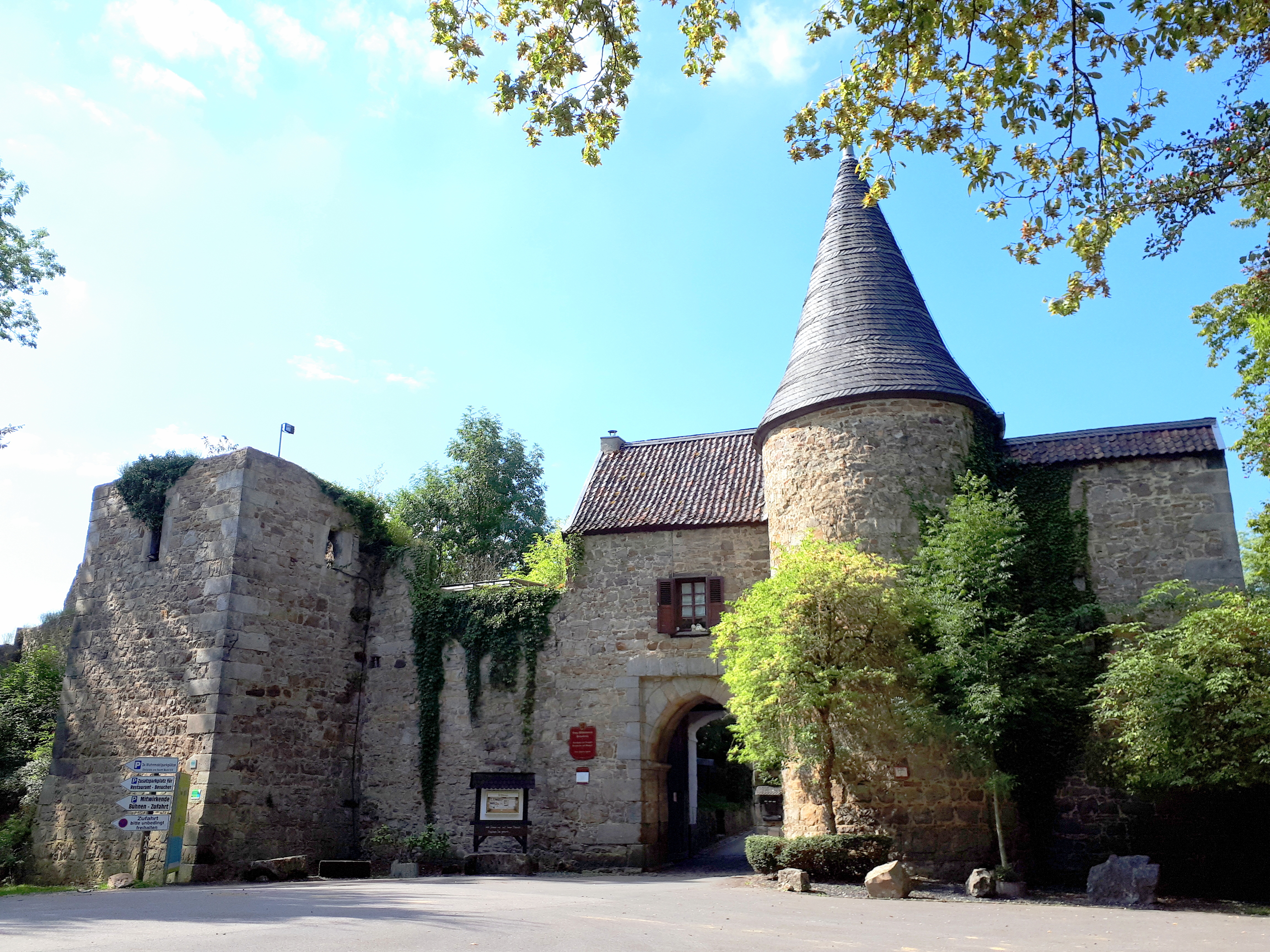
Burg Wilhelmstein, Würselen

== Transport ==
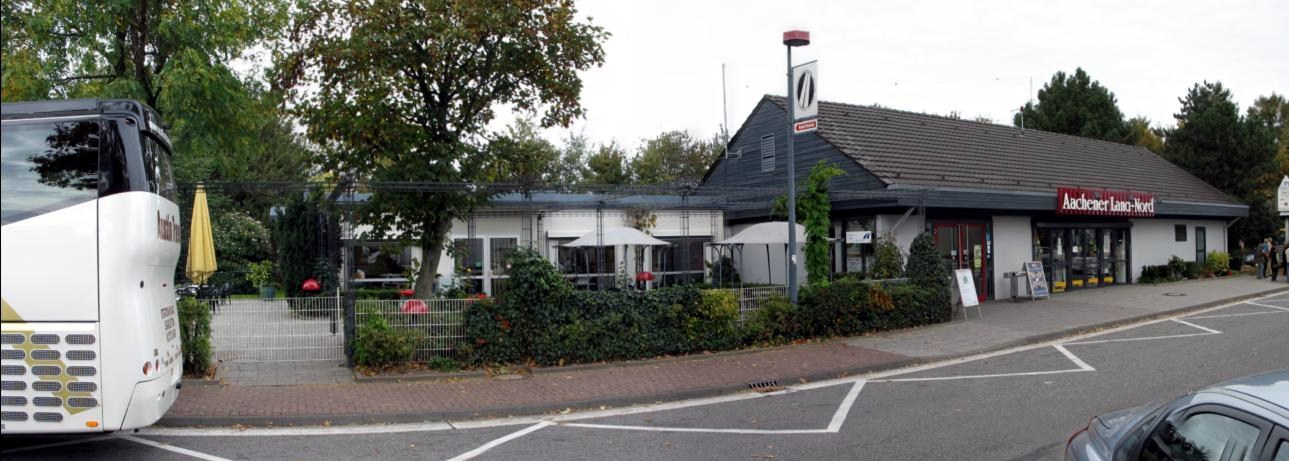
Service area on the A4 near Eschweiler

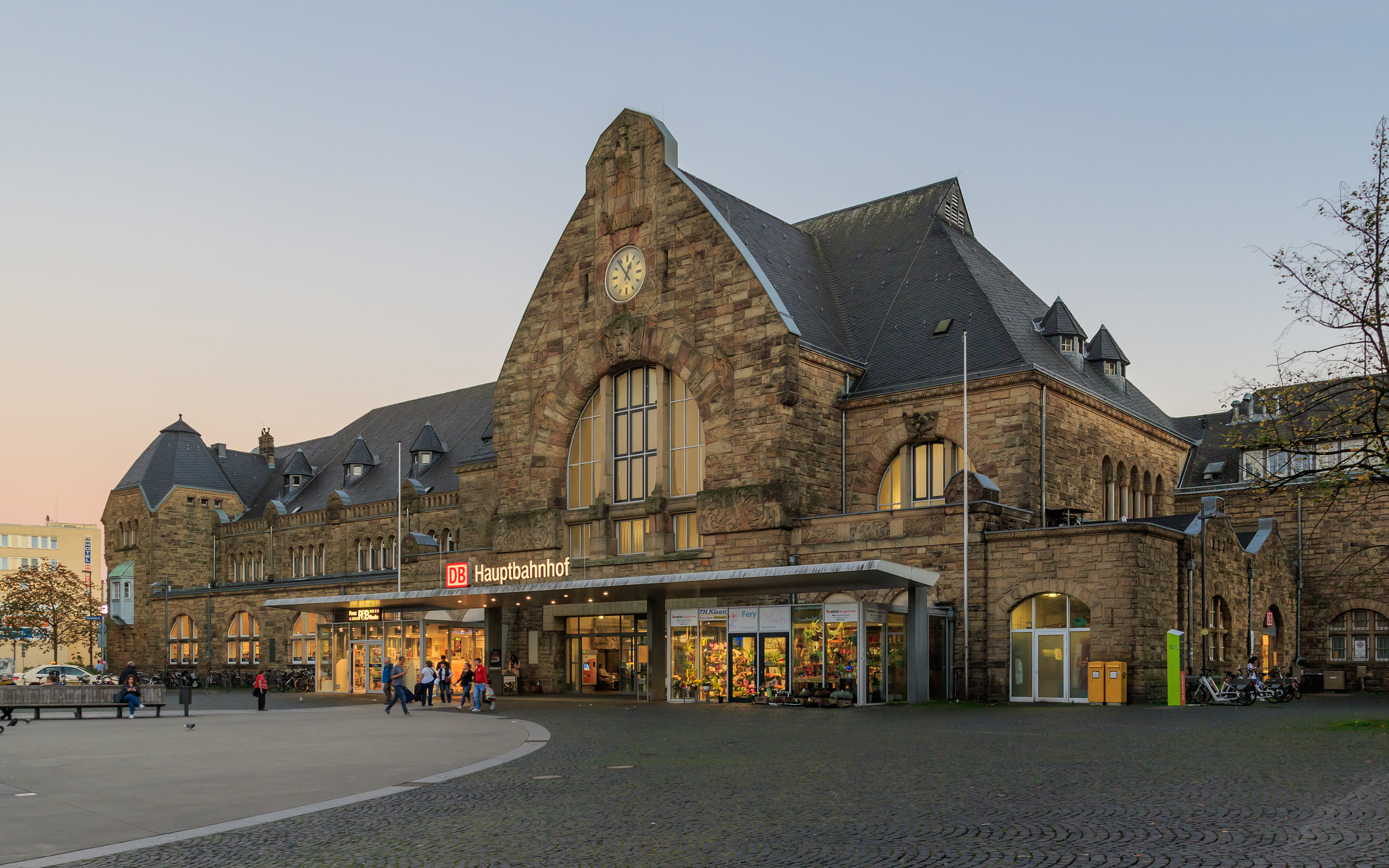
Aachen central station

Aachen-Merzbrück airfield in Würselen

=== Roads ===
Three motorways run through the region: the A4 (with the Aachener Land service area), the A44 and the A544. Federal roads include the B1, B56, B57, B258, B264, B266 and B399. The road traffic authority (Straßenverkehrsamt) is based in Würselen, with a branch in Monschau.

Vehicle registration plates in the district carry the AC prefix, assigned on 1 July 1956. Since 2 July 2013 the MON prefix, formerly used in the old Kreis Monschau until 1971, has also been available.

=== Cycling ===
The region is part of North Rhine-Westphalia's cycle route network. The former Vennbahn has been converted into a long-distance cycle path, and the former Aachen Nord–Jülich railway corridor into a cycle expressway. A planned cycle expressway would link Aachen, Herzogenrath, Kerkrade and Heerlen (30 km).

=== Rail and public transport ===
The region is served by the Aachener Verkehrsverbund public transport network. Rail lines connect Aachen to Heerlen, Mönchengladbach, Düsseldorf, Düren, Cologne and Liège. The Cologne–Aachen railway, opened in 1841, and the Aachen–Mönchengladbach railway, opened in 1852, form the main trunk lines through the region.

The Euregiobahn operates regional rail services on secondary lines, including the reactivated Stolberg–Herzogenrath railway and parts of the Mönchengladbach–Stolberg railway and Stolberg–Walheim railway. Major passenger stations include Aachen Hbf, Aachen-Rothe Erde, Aachen-Schanz, Aachen-West, Eschweiler Hbf, Eschweiler-Talbahnhof, Herzogenrath and Stolberg Hbf.

A planned Regiotram Aachen light rail line would run from Aachen central station along the Krefelder Straße (B57) to Baesweiler, with a planned branch to Aachen-Merzbrück Airport. The project is currently under feasibility study.

=== Air ===
Maastricht Aachen Airport lies about 35 km away near Maastricht. The airports of Cologne/Bonn and Düsseldorf Airport, each roughly 80 km distant, are reachable by rail on the RE1, RE4 and S11 lines. Aachen-Merzbrück Airport in Würselen serves business aviation.

== Education ==
The region has 98 primary schools, 7 special schools, 23 Gymnasien, 16 Hauptschulen, 14 Realschulen, 9 comprehensive schools and 8 vocational colleges. Five universities and colleges are located within the district, all on the territory of the city of Aachen and collectively enrolling up to 50,000 students: RWTH Aachen University, FH Aachen, a branch of the Katholische Hochschule Nordrhein-Westfalen, a department of the Cologne University of Music and the Hochschule für Polizei und öffentliche Verwaltung Nordrhein-Westfalen.

== Media ==
Since 4 October 2010, Antenne AC has broadcast as the regional commercial radio station, succeeding the separate 107.8 Antenne AC (district) and Radio Aachen (city). The public broadcaster WDR 2 operates a local studio (WDR Studio Aachen) covering Aachen and the region; students run Hochschulradio Aachen. Several German-language Belgian regional stations, such as 100'5 Das Hitradio, target listeners in the border area and broadcast content accordingly.

== Partnership ==
As legal successor to the Kreis Aachen, the Städteregion continues the partnership with Jeleniogórski County in Poland, agreed in March 1990 and reaffirmed in February 2000. Negotiations had begun in October 1985; Poland's 1999 administrative reform required formal transfer of the partnership to the newly constituted county.

Under the Region Charlemagne initiative, the Städteregion pursues closer cross-border cooperation within the Euregio Meuse-Rhine, particularly in public transport and foreign-language teaching, with existing ties to Parkstad Limburg and the German-speaking Community of Belgium.
