= Decauville railway of Suberbieville =

Suberbieville (now Maevatanana)
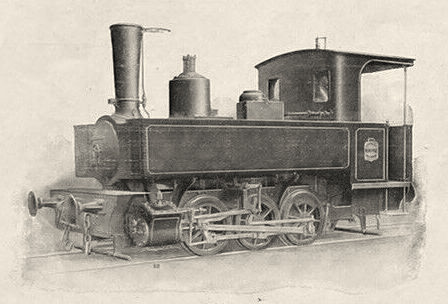
- Decauville metre gauge steam locomotive

Technical
- Line length: 30 km (19 mi)
- Track gauge: Initially 600 mm (1 ft 11 5/8 in) and later 1,000 mm (3 ft 3 3/8 in)
Route map
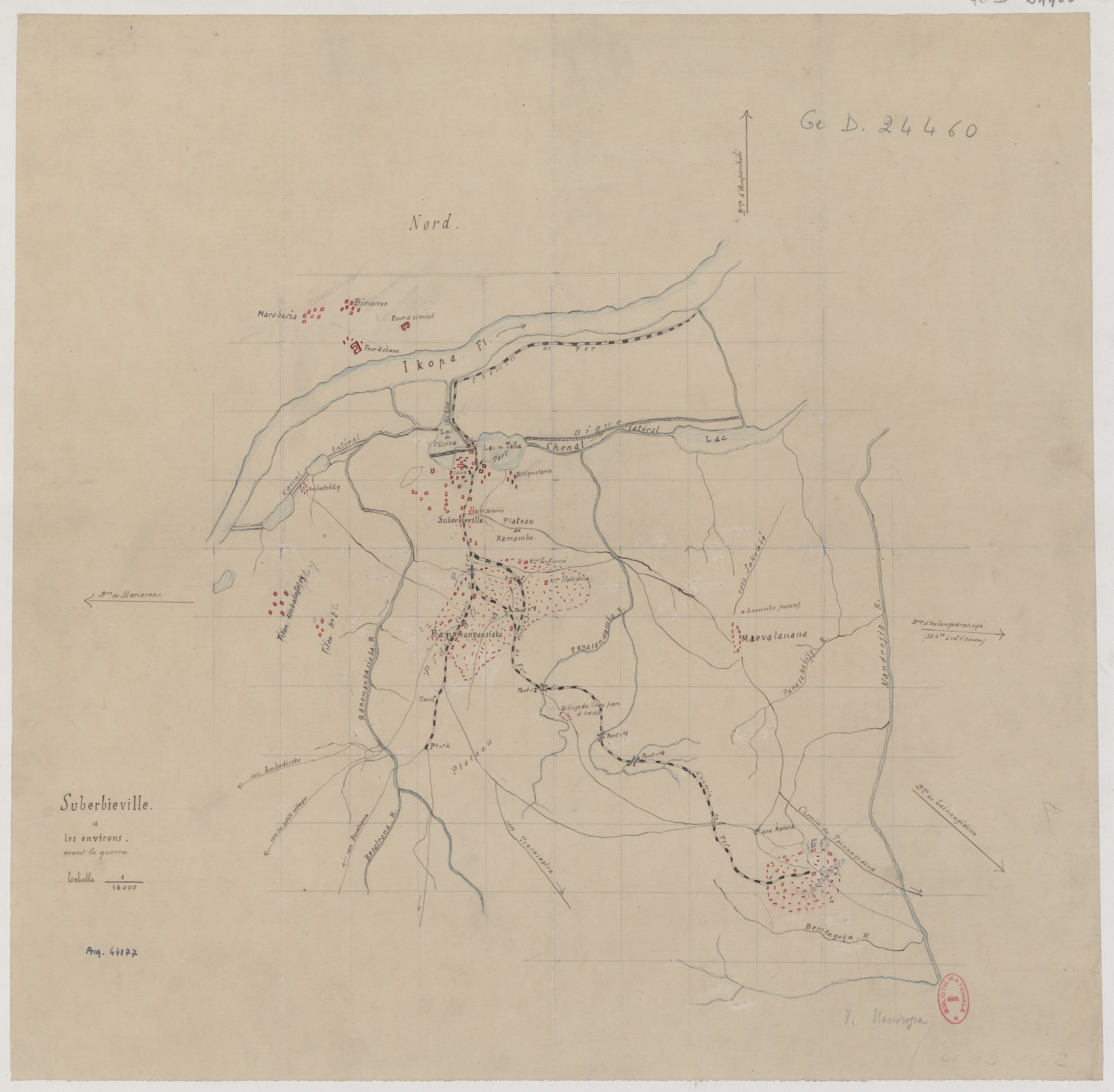
Route map, prior to 1914

The Decauville railway of Suberbieville was a Decauville narrow-gauge railway near Maevatanana (formerly: Suberbieville) in Madagascar. It initially had a track gauge of 600 mm (1 ft 11 5/8 in) and after the arrival of six steam locomotives in 1896, it was metre gauge.

== History ==
Léon Suberbie only stayed in Madagascar for a short time, when he signed a contract with the Prime Minister on 2 December 1886 for the exploitation of gold mines. He then travelled back to France to acquire the capital required for exploration. The Compagnie coloniale et des mines d'or de Suberbieville el de la côté ouest de Madagascar hoped to obtain a railway concession on similar terms to the Société bordelaise on the east coast and later the Compagnie coloniale de Madagascar. During the time-consuming negotiations, it launched a small project. It laid a Decauville railway on the road from Suberbieville to the west, presumably where Lac de Usine accumulated after the construction of a dyke. In return, it demanded a traffic guarantee of 4 to 5,000 tonnes per year. The interim governor-general of Madagascar Théophile Pennequin (born 25 December 1849 in Toulon; died 19 June 1916) supported the project, as it made it possible to dispense with the planned east coast railway, which he considered to be extremely costly for the colonial budget.

On 7 December 1895, the Parisian magazine Le Temps announced that the Société Suberbie was preparing to build the first railway in Madagascar and that, for this purpose, thirty kilometres of track, six locomotives and 280 wagons manufactured by the Société Nouvelle des Etablissements Decauville were to be loaded onto one of the next passenger ships.

A newspaper published in Paris, La Métallurgie, and a newspaper published in Saint-Dizier, L'Ancre, reported that the Société Decauville, which had been commissioned by the Société Suberbie to build the equipment needed to operate the concessionary railway lines in Madagascar, was said to have turned to Belgian factories to which it wanted to subcontract this supply. Société Decauville, which operated the Decauville works in Val-Saint-Lambert as a subsidiary in Belgium, felt defamed by the newspaper reports and took the newspapers to court.

== Locomotives ==
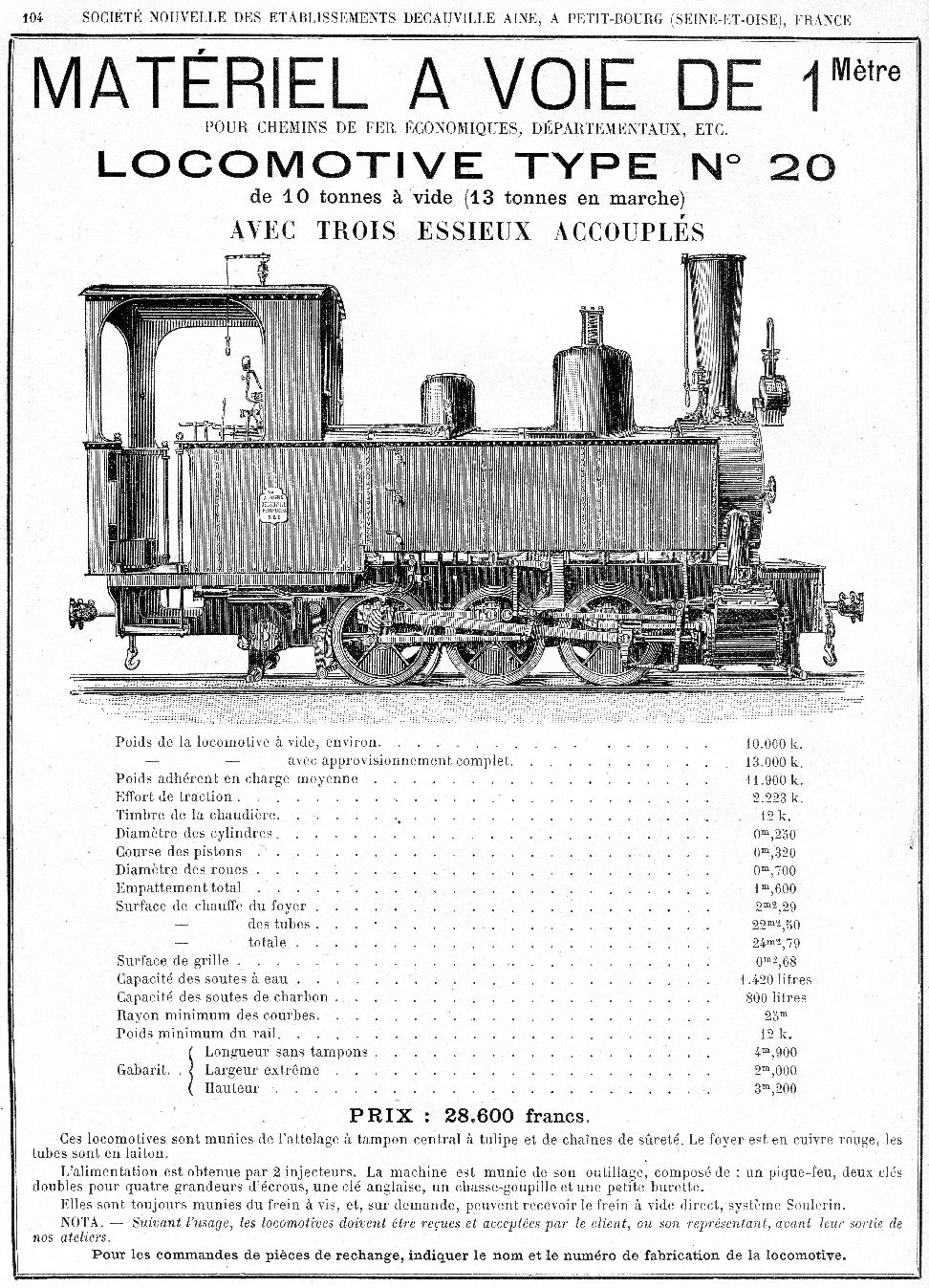
Specification of the Decauville locomotives N° 221-225/1896

Six three-coupled Decauville steam locomotives with the works numbers N° 221–225, built in 1896, were used on the metre-gauge line; they had been delivered to the mining company L. Suberbie & Co at a list price of 28,600 francs each.
