= List of protected heritage sites in Seraing =

This table shows an overview of the protected heritage sites in the Walloon town Seraing. This list is part of Belgium's national heritage.

Object	Year/architect	Town/section	Address	Coordinates	Number^{?}	Image
Vecquée Forest reserve ^{(nl)} ^{(fr)}		Seraing		50.551041°N 5.517098°E	62096-CLT-0001-01 Info	
Forest of Vecquée ^{(nl)} ^{(fr)}		Seraing		50.577892°N 5.518969°E	62096-CLT-0002-01 Info	Bos van Vecquée
Val-Saint-Lambert Abbey: entrance gate, the castle (north facade and west facade, staircase of the quarters of the abbey and the wrought iron gates), facade of the building next to the courtyard on the south side, the former chapter house, buildings (facades and roofs), concert hall (walls) and the tribunal with the facades of the buildings that surround it. ^{(nl)} ^{(fr)}		Seraing	rue du Val Saint-Lambert n°245	50.593461°N 5.482423°E	62096-CLT-0003-01 Info	
Parts of the abbey Val Saint-Lambert, the walls (except the parts that were classified by the Royal Decree of 26 November 1973), roofs, garden, and outer walls of the Abbey ^{(nl)} ^{(fr)}		Seraing		50.594043°N 5.483311°E	62096-CLT-0005-01 Info	
Buildings: walls and roofs, in the court of the Val-Saint-Lambert abbey ^{(nl)} ^{(fr)}		Seraing		50.590823°N 5.483741°E	62096-CLT-0007-01 Info	
Castle Courtejoie ou d'Olloy and its smaller adjacent buildings built around 1860 (except more modern construction), and the surrounding area ^{(nl)} ^{(fr)}		Seraing	rue A. de Lexhy, n°36	50.617005°N 5.501167°E	62096-CLT-0008-01 Info	Ensemble van het kasteel Courtejoie of Olloy en de kleine aangrenzende gebouwen, met uitzondering van de aanbouw, gebouwd rond 1860, en het ensemble van het kasteel met de omliggende terreinen
Antoine castle and its surroundings ^{(nl)} ^{(fr)}		Seraing	rue A. de Borre n°11	50.617352°N 5.504597°E	62096-CLT-0011-01 Info	Kasteel Antoine en het ensemble van het kasteel en de omliggende terreinen
Castle Ordange and its surroundings ^{(nl)} ^{(fr)}		Seraing	rue d'Ordange n°8	50.617953°N 5.502945°E	62096-CLT-0012-01 Info	Kasteel van Ordange en het ensemble van het kasteel en de omliggende terreinen
Ash tree ^{(nl)} ^{(fr)}		Seraing	rue du Vieux Chêne	50.566778°N 5.551670°E	62096-CLT-0013-01 Info	
Certain parts of the castle of Seraing ^{(nl)} ^{(fr)}		Seraing		50.615755°N 5.512305°E	62096-CLT-0014-01 Info	
Town hall: walls, roofs, ceiling of the large room upstairs ^{(nl)} ^{(fr)}		Seraing	place Communale	50.614946°N 5.509183°E	62096-CLT-0016-01 Info	
Certain parts of the castle of Seraing (Castle Cockerill), extension of the Royal Decree of April 23, 1980 ^{(nl)} ^{(fr)}		Seraing	quai Greiner n°2, Seraing	50.615776°N 5.512482°E	62096-CLT-0019-01 Info	
The scriptorium, with fragments of plaster from the old abbey of Val-Saint-Lambert ^{(nl)} ^{(fr)}		Seraing		50.592349°N 5.482393°E	62096-PEX-0001-01 Info	
The wall decorations and furniture of the chapel located in the Castle Ordange ^{(nl)} ^{(fr)}		Seraing		50.617953°N 5.502945°E	62096-PEX-0002-01 Info	De muurdecoratie van de kapel en het meubilair gesitueerd in het Kasteel van Ordange

== See also ==
- List of protected heritage sites in Liège (province)
- Seraing
