= Boncelles =

Coordinates: 50.5753°N 5.5353°E

Boncelles (French pronunciation: [bɔ̃sɛl]; Walloon: Les Bonceles) is a town of Wallonia and a district of the municipality of Seraing, located in the province of Liège, Belgium.

The Fort de Boncelles is situated in Boncelles.
