= Val-Saint-Lambert Abbey =

Cistercian abbey in Belgium

Coordinates: 50.593287°N 5.4826608°E

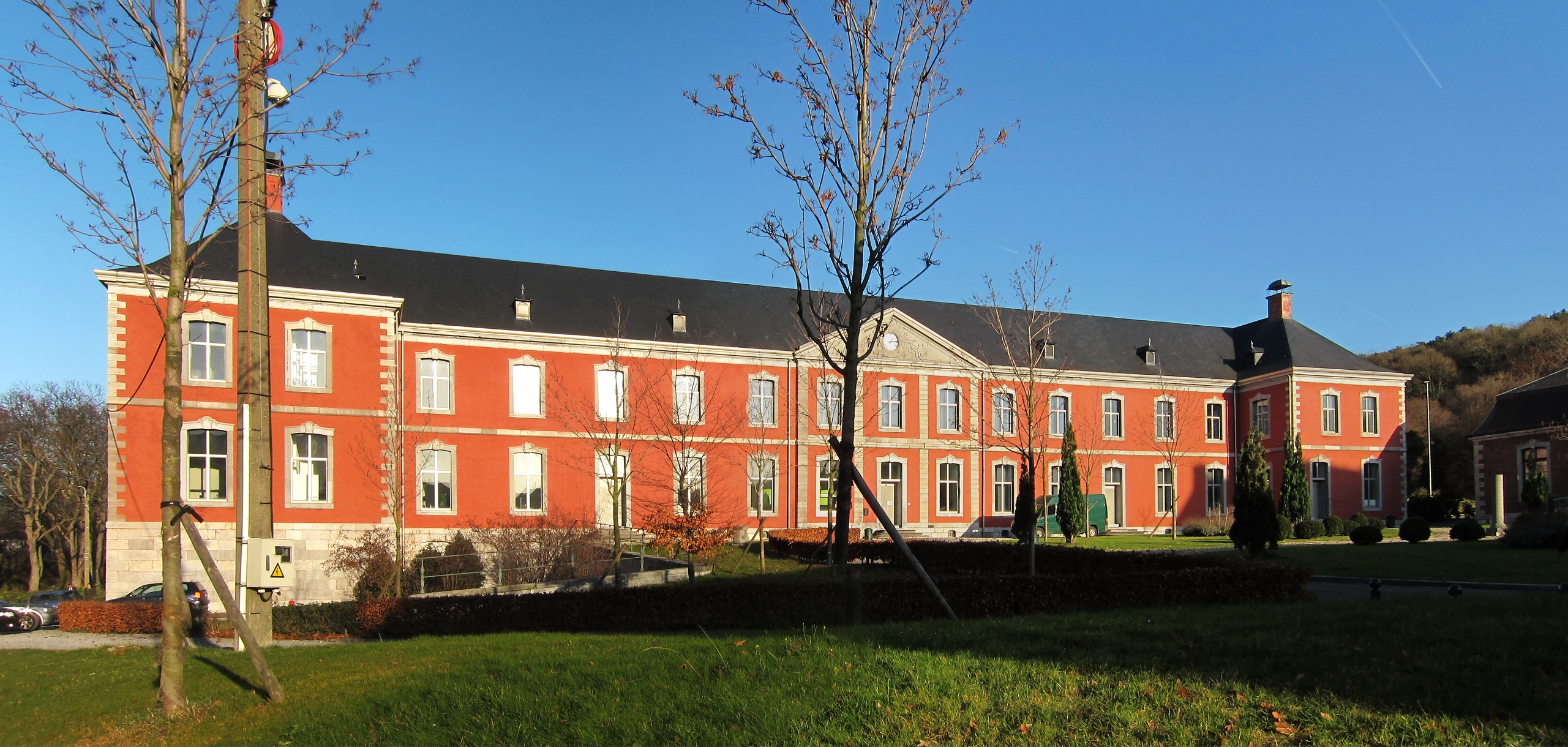
Val-Saint-Lambert Abbey

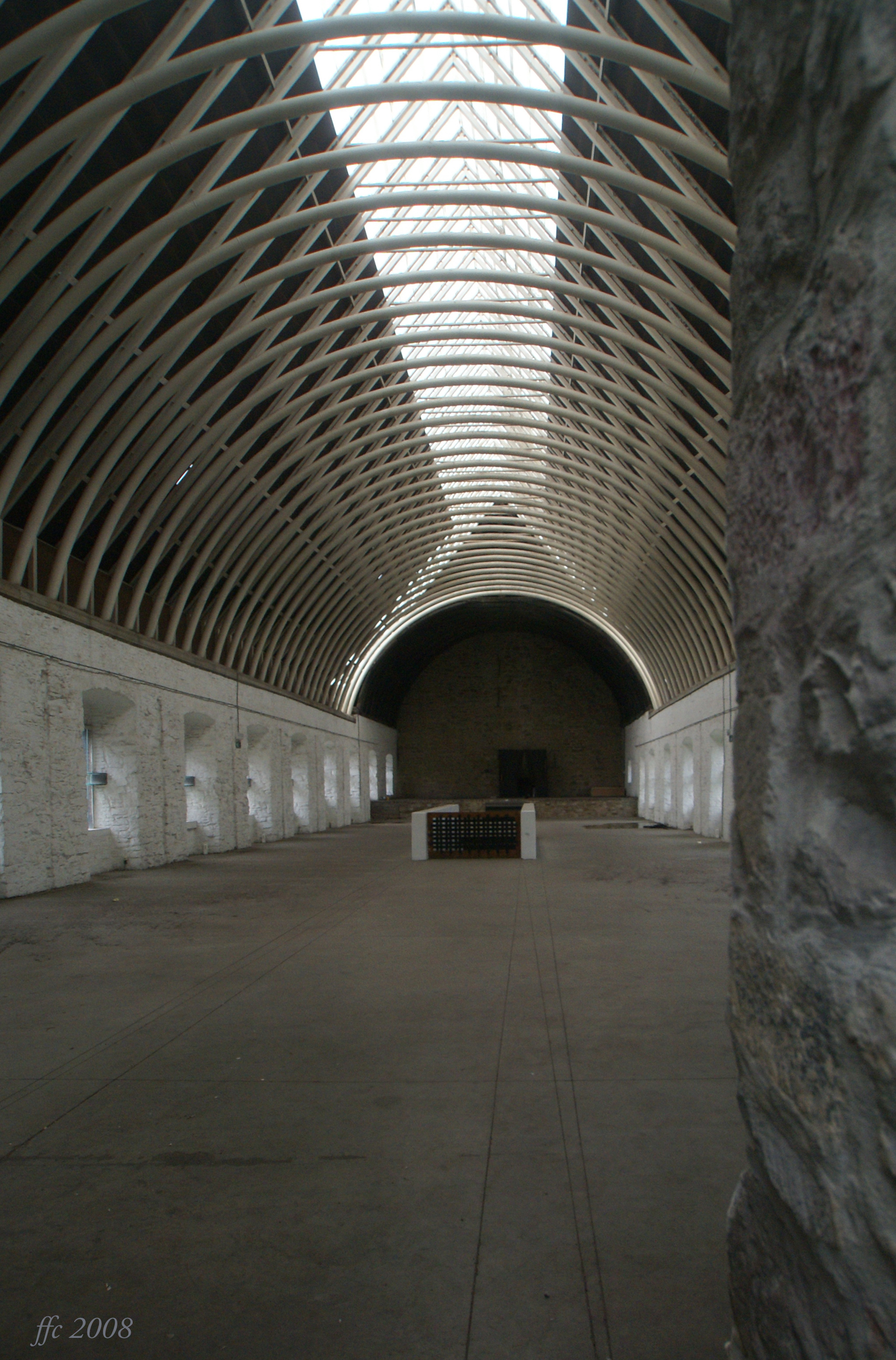
The abbey's dormitory

Val-Saint-Lambert Abbey (French: Abbaye du Val-Saint-Lambert) was a Cistercian abbey in the Prince-Bishopric of Liège. It is situated in the Walloon municipality of Seraing, on the right bank of the Meuse, in Belgium, about 13 km (8.1 mi) south-west of Liège. Founded in 1202, the abbey's monks were expelled during the French Revolution. In the 19th century, the building ruins were converted into the Val Saint Lambert crystal factory. The structure is considered to be an important example of Cistercian architecture.

== History ==
Up to the year 1192, the site was almost deserted. The foundation of the abbey is attributed to Hugues de Pierrepont, Bishop of Liège, who in 1187 decided to establish Val-Saint-Lambert. Construction began in 1202 after he gave a tract of land and woods situated in what was then called the Champ des Maures to a group of monks. The abbey was a daughter house of Signy Abbey in Ardennes, France, which was a daughter house of Igny Abbey. Val-Saint-Lambert Abbey was inhabited by a religious community for centuries; it prospered and became powerful. The abbey's chateau served as the summer palace of the Prince-Bishopric of Liège. The abbot Simon de Harlez, Val-Saint-Lambert's sponsor, canon of St. Lambert's Cathedral, Liège, and adviser to the prince-bishop, began an expansion project in 1750, funded by his coal earnings. It was completed before 1796 when the monks were expelled as a result of the French Revolution, at which time the buildings were demolished and the holdings were sold as public goods. In 1825, the abbey ruins were purchased by the chemist François Kemlin and the engineer Auguste Lelièvre, who converted the building into a glass works. Since 1826, it has been used by the crystal manufacturer Val-Saint-Lambert. In 1846, Val Saint-Lambert merged with the Société Anonyme des Manufactures de Glaces.

The factory today provides demonstrations of glass-blowing and crystal engraving and items are put on sale in the showroom. A restoration project, known as the Cristal Park project, commenced in 2004, is to restore the Val Saint Lambert chateau and the abbey and to establish a retail village with 4 residential developments, a Business Park with 12 office buildings, and a new crystal glassworks, a 120-room hotel, indoor ski-slope, water park, restaurants and cafés.

== Architecture and fittings ==
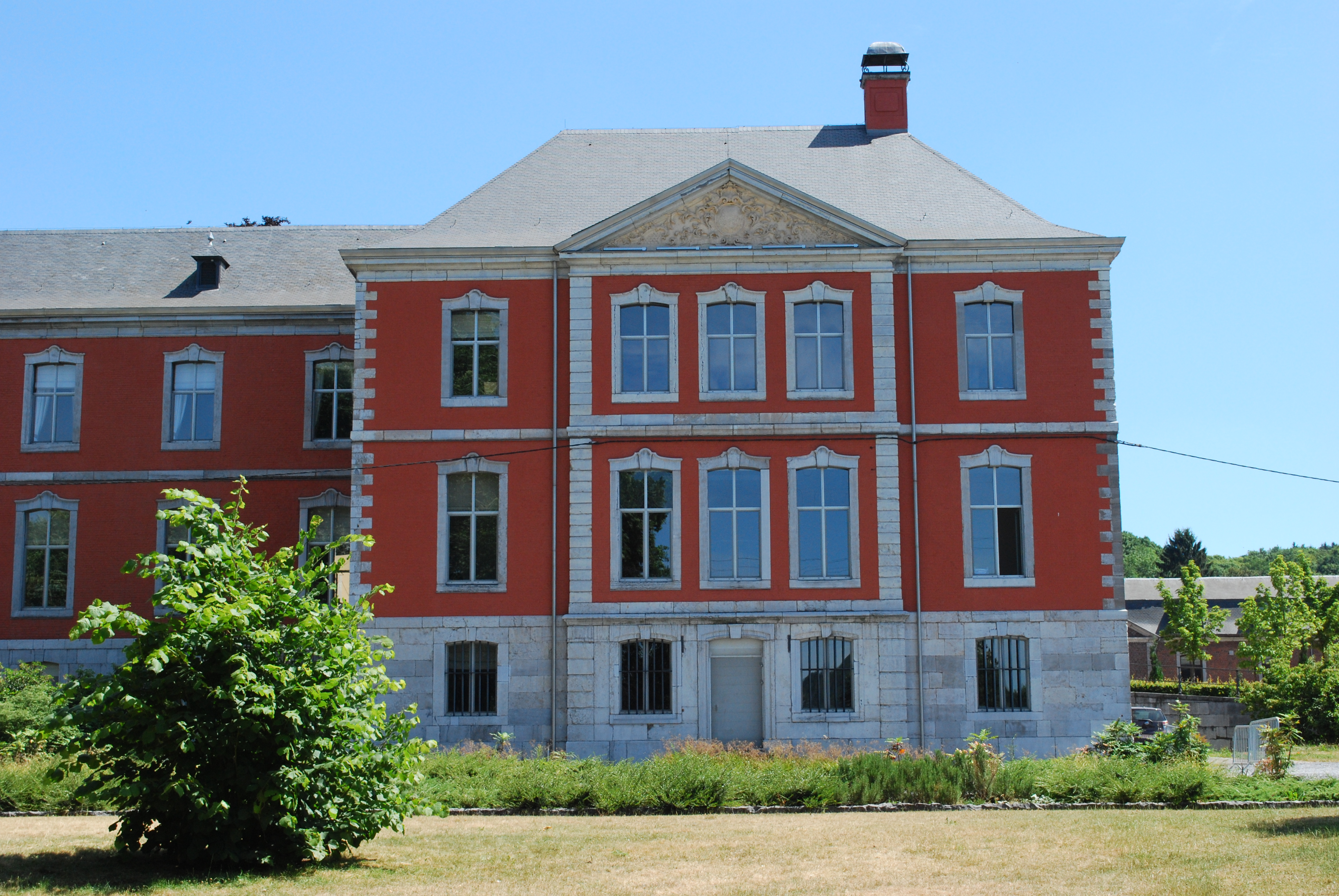
A wing of the abbey

Several original buildings from the ancient abbey remain, such as the 13th century Chapter House; the 17th century House of Outsiders chateau, built in Mosan style, which houses the crystal museum; and the 18th century abbey entrance, which serves as Seraing's Tourist Information Office. The abbey was classified as a historical monument in 1973. The structure is considered to be an important example of Cistercian architecture as well as Gothic architectural development in Belgium.

== See also ==
- List of protected heritage sites in Seraing
- List of Christian religious houses in Belgium
