= Barthold Suermondt =

German entrepreneur, banker, philanthropist and art collector (1818–1887)

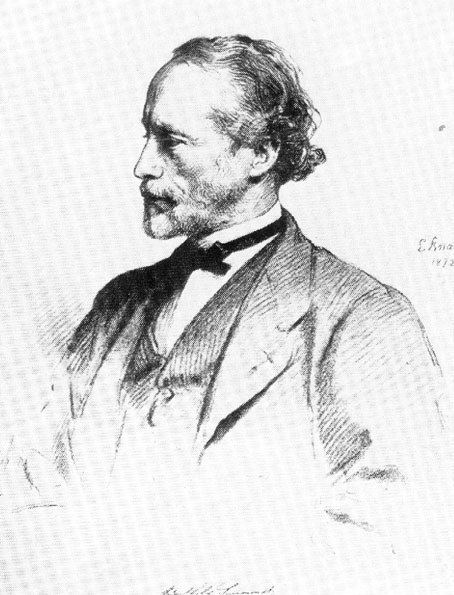
Barthold Suermondt portrayed in 1872

Barthold Suermondt (18 May 1818, Utrecht – 1 March 1887, Aachen) was a German entrepreneur, banker, philanthropist, and art collector, of Dutch-Huguenot heritage.

He was born in 1818 in Utrecht to Yman Dirk Christiaan Suermondt and Elizabeth Twiss. In the 1830s he worked with the Cockerill-Sambre steel manufacturers in Seraing, Belgium. He took over management of the company in 1840 following the sudden death of his boss John Cockerill. Coming from French extraction, Suermondt was responsible for attracting French investment into Germany during the 1830s–40s. At that time he founded in Germany a steel company that after a number of name changes in 1870 became known as Rheinische Stahlwerks, where he served as president until 1878.

His first marriage in 1838 was to Amalie Elisabeth Cockerill (1815–59), heiress to her father James Cockerill's fortune, and after the death of the childless John, also heiress to the John Cockerill fortune. The couple had six sons. After Amalia's sister Nancy (1816-1854) died they also took care of Friederike Nancy Haniel (1843–1896), and after Amalia died Barthold married her and had their pendant portraits painted. Nancy's father was the mining entrepreneur Max Haniel.

He was a major collector of Netherlandish and Dutch Golden Age painting, and acquired works by, amongst others, Jan van Eyck, Jan Vermeer, Frans Hals, Hans Holbein the Younger, Peter Paul Rubens and Jan Steen. In 1874 a large part of the Suermondt collection was passed to the Gemäldegalerie, Berlin, a purchase headed by Julius Meyer and art historian Wilhelm von Bode funded by a grant of £50,000. The sale of his art collection came when his company experienced a rapid collapse. Another portion of his collection, amounting to 105 paintings, was bequeathed to the city of Aachen in 1882, and was instrumental in building up the display of the Suermondt-Ludwig-Museum. That year Suermondt was made an honorary citizen of the city of Aachen. Around 1850, he had been portrayed in three-quarter view by Ludwig Knaus; today the work hangs in the foyer of the Suermondt-Ludwig.

== Sources ==
- Alexander, Edward P. Museum Masters: Their Museums and Their Influence. Sage Publications, 2002. ISBN 0-7619-9131-X
- Cameron, Rondo E. France and the Economic Development of Europe, 1800–1914. Routledge, 1961.
- James, Harold. Family Capitalism: Wendels, Haniels, Falcks, and the Continental European Model Harvard University Press, ISBN 978-0-674-02181-5
- Meiss, Millard. "Light as Form and Symbol in Some Fifteenth-Century Paintings". The Art Bulletin, Volume 27, No. 3, 1945. JSTOR 3047010
- Pocknell, Pauline (ed). "Franz Liszt and Agnes Street-Klindworth: A Correspondence, 1854–1886". Pendragon Press, 2000. ISBN 1-57647-006-7
