= James Cockerill =

British entrepreneur

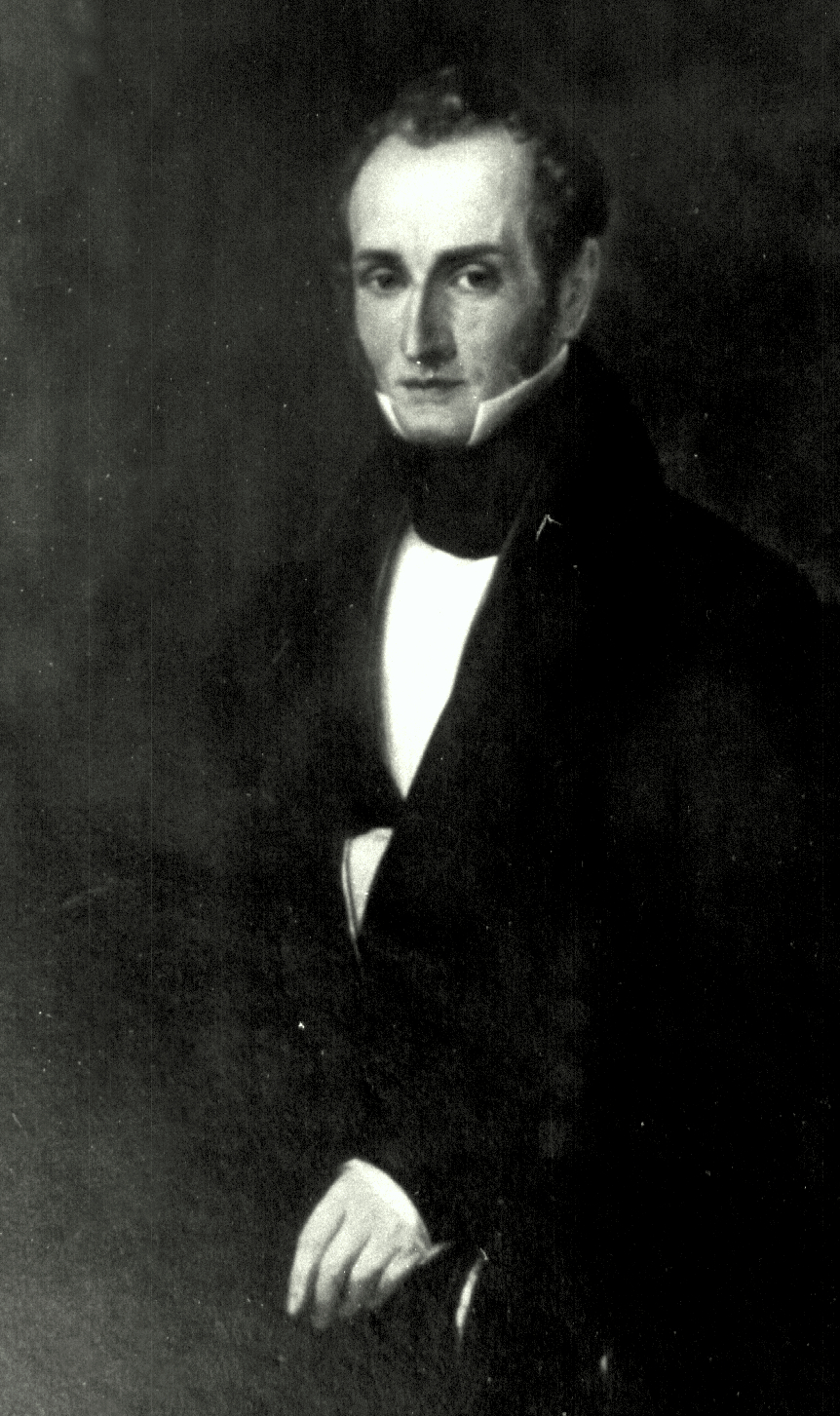
- Born: 1787
- Died: 1837 (aged 49–50); Aachen

Charles James Cockerill (1787 – 1837) was a British entrepreneur.

Cockerill was the son of William Cockerill and was in business with his brothers John and William Jr. Together with his brother John, he married a daughter of the Aachen industrialist Philipp Heinrich Pastor on the same day. He married Catherina and John married Johanna. In 1816 the two brothers went into business with William II of the Netherlands and founded the Cockerill company in Seraing, near Liège. James retired in 1820, leaving control of the business to John.

James and Catherina had the children Amalia (who married Cockerill plant manager Barthold Suermondt), Philipp Heinrich, Adele, Charles James II, Charles Frederic, Nancy, and Caroline. After his death he was survived by his wife and children. Since his brother died in 1840 without issue the family fortune was managed by Barthold, and together with the Adele Cockerill foundation, they founded the Suermondt-Ludwig-Museum.
