= Val Saint Lambert =

Belgian glassware manufacturer

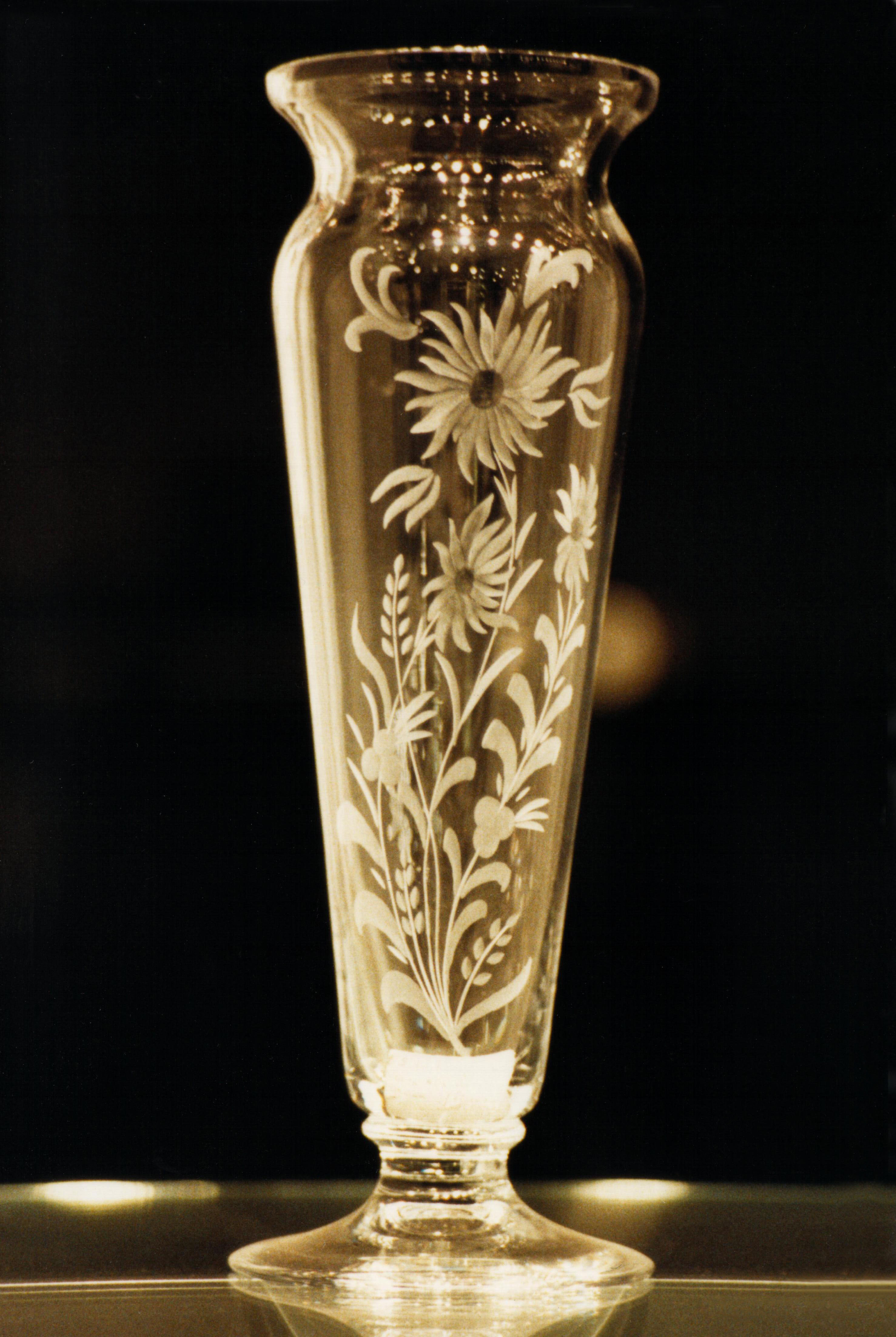
Crystal vase from Val Saint Lambert

Val Saint Lambert is a Belgian crystal glassware manufacturer, founded in 1826 and based in Seraing. It has the royal warrant of King Albert II.

== Earlier glassworks ==
In 1795 during the War of the First Coalition which brought about the fall of the Dutch Republic, France had annexed what was then termed the Southern Netherlands, now known as Belgium. During the period of the Napoleonic Wars, in 1802 Napoleon Bonaparte asked French industrialist Henri D'Artigues to leave the noted French crystal maker Saint-Louis to buy the dilapidated glassworks at Vonêche. Like Saint-Louis, Vonêche produced lead crystal glass, and within ten years had become the most important crystal producer in the French empire. Two of the key workers in the plant's success were chemist François Kemlin and engineer Auguste Lelièvre. In 1815 following Napoleon's defeat at the Battle of Waterloo, the Southern Netherlands was re-united within the new United Kingdom of the Netherlands. As a result of newly imposed import duties, the Vonêche factory immediately lost most of its French market. In 1816, D'Artigues negotiated with King Louis XVIII of France to buy the Verrerie de St Anne glassworks in the town of Baccarat, and renamed it the Verrerie de Vonêche à Baccarat – a name it kept until 1843. The Belgian Revolution of 1830 meant that the Vonêche glassworks also lost most of its Southern Holland market, and hence closed soon afterwards.

== History ==
In 1825 Kemlin and Lelièvre bought the site of the former Val-Saint-Lambert Abbey in Seraing near Liège on the river Meuse. There they founded a new glassworks, originally focused on heavy lead crystal), which initially employed some of the key workers from the former Vonêche glassworks.

Due to the quality of its designs and manufacturing process, the company developed a well known brand and expanded. Aside from its home territory of Belgium and the Netherlands, the largest export market was to then Tsarist-ruled Russia. In 1876 the company opened a distribution base in New York, and in 1889 the company's CEO visited the store, and toured locally based competitor East Coast factories. On his return to Belgium the CEO described in his report the then superior quality of American glass and the skill of its crystal cutters, which the company responded to by developing its own "bright" ranges and superior quality cutting. The resulting "brilliant period" expanded the companies reputation and market especially in North America, and hence today it is well known and collected there for its Art Nouveau and Art Deco pieces. In 1894 at the world exhibition in Antwerp, the company manufactured an over 2 metres high vase consisting of 82 parts and weighing 200 kilograms, which is still intact and now on display at the Curtius Museum in Liège. As the company became more successful – at its height in the period 1900–1914, it employed over 5,000 workers creating 120,000 pieces of glass per day – the company contracted out work to other factories, latterly either buying them or opening new factories, including: Jemeppe (1883 to 1952); two near Namur (1879 to 1935); and Jambes (1880 to 1931, producing oil glass lamps).

The company stopped producing during World War I, and post-war after the Russian Revolution the market in Russia totally collapsed, resulting in financial difficulties and contraction. Exports to North America saved the company, which again had difficulties with the collapse of that market post the Wall Street crash of 1929. The company hence closed the Jambes and two Namur factories, and was stable by the time of World War II, during which like most of Belgium the factory was bombed by both the Nazi Luftwaffe and the Allied Air Forces of the Royal Air Force and United States Army Air Forces. Production resumed initially in the less bomb-damaged Jemeppe factory until the production lines could be restored at Seraing, which resulted in the closure of the Jemeppe factory in the 1950s. Whilst many of the buildings at Seraing were restored, a large part of the site remained as was post-WW2 until the early 2000s, when these derelict 19th century buildings were cleared to create the modern steel-framed factory, visitor centre and small factory shop which exist today, together with the original restored 19th century factory offices.
