= Seraing =

City in Liège Province, Wallonia, Belgium

Seraing: Serè (Walloon)
- City and municipality
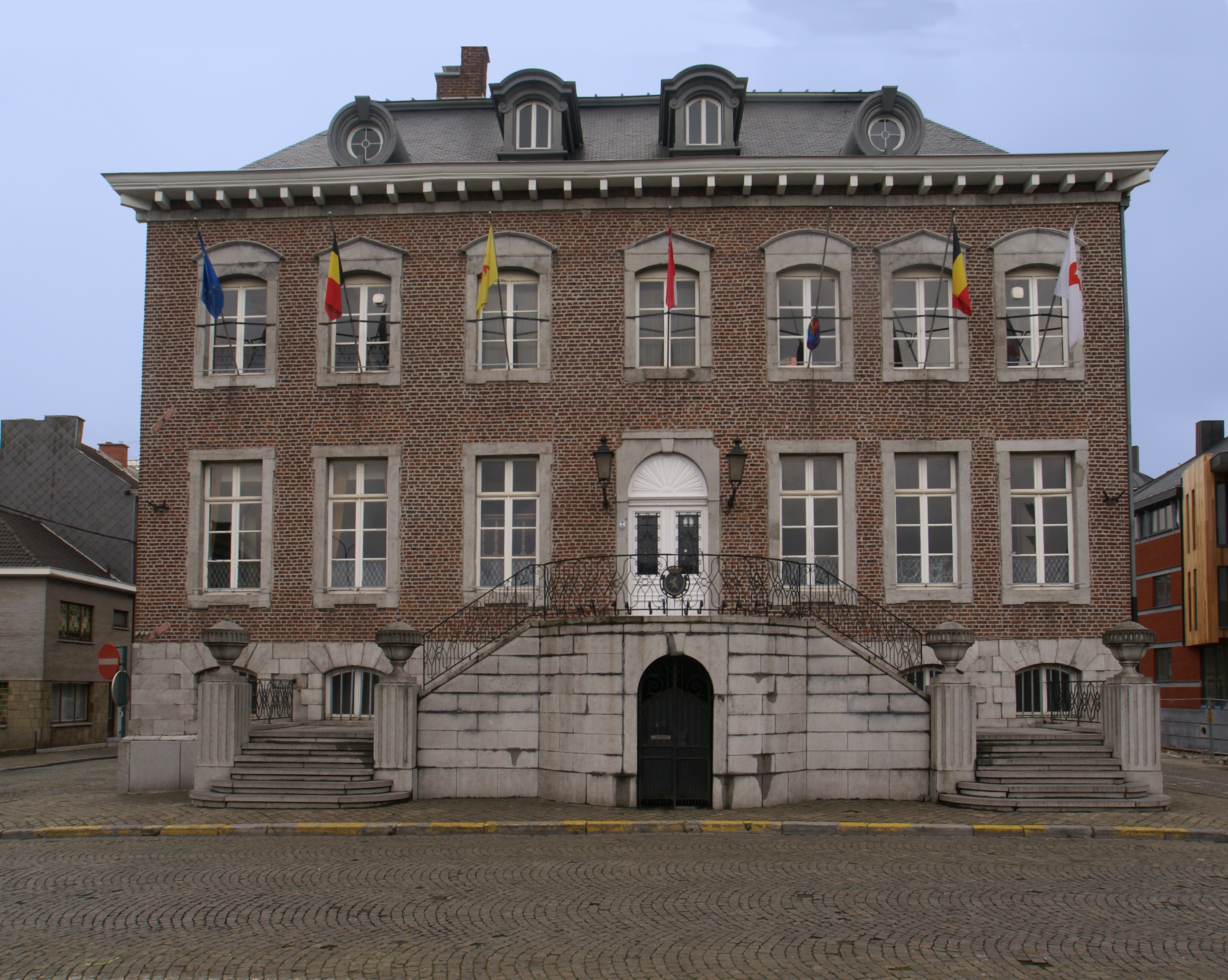
- City Hall

- Flag Coat of arms

- Location of Seraing in the province of Liège
- Interactive map of Seraing
- Location in Belgium
- Coordinates: 50°35′N 05°30′E
- Country: Belgium
- Community: French Community
- Region: Wallonia
- Province: Liège
- Arrondissement: Liège

Government
  - Mayor: Déborah Géradon (PS)
  - Governing party: PS

Area
  - Total: 35.25 km^{2} (13.61 sq mi)

Population (2018-01-01)
  - Total: 64,270
  - Density: 1,823/km^{2} (4,722/sq mi)
- Postal codes: 4100, 4101, 4102
- NIS code: 62096
- Area codes: 04
- Website: www.seraing.be

Seraing (French pronunciation: [səʁɛ̃]; Walloon: Serè) is a municipality and city in Liège Province, Wallonia, Belgium.

The municipality consists of the following districts: Boncelles, Jemeppe-sur-Meuse, Ougrée, and Seraing. With Liège, Herstal, Saint-Nicolas, Ans, and Flémalle, it forms the greater Liège agglomeration (600,000 inhabitants). South of Seraing are the Condroz and the Ardennes regions.

== History ==
=== Antiquity and Middle Ages ===
The first mention of Saran dates from 956, when a Carolingian farming domain extending on both sides of the river Meuse and owned by someone named Saran was donated to the abbey of Sint-Truiden. The whole territory soon passed to the Prince-Bishopric of Liège.

=== Industrial development ===
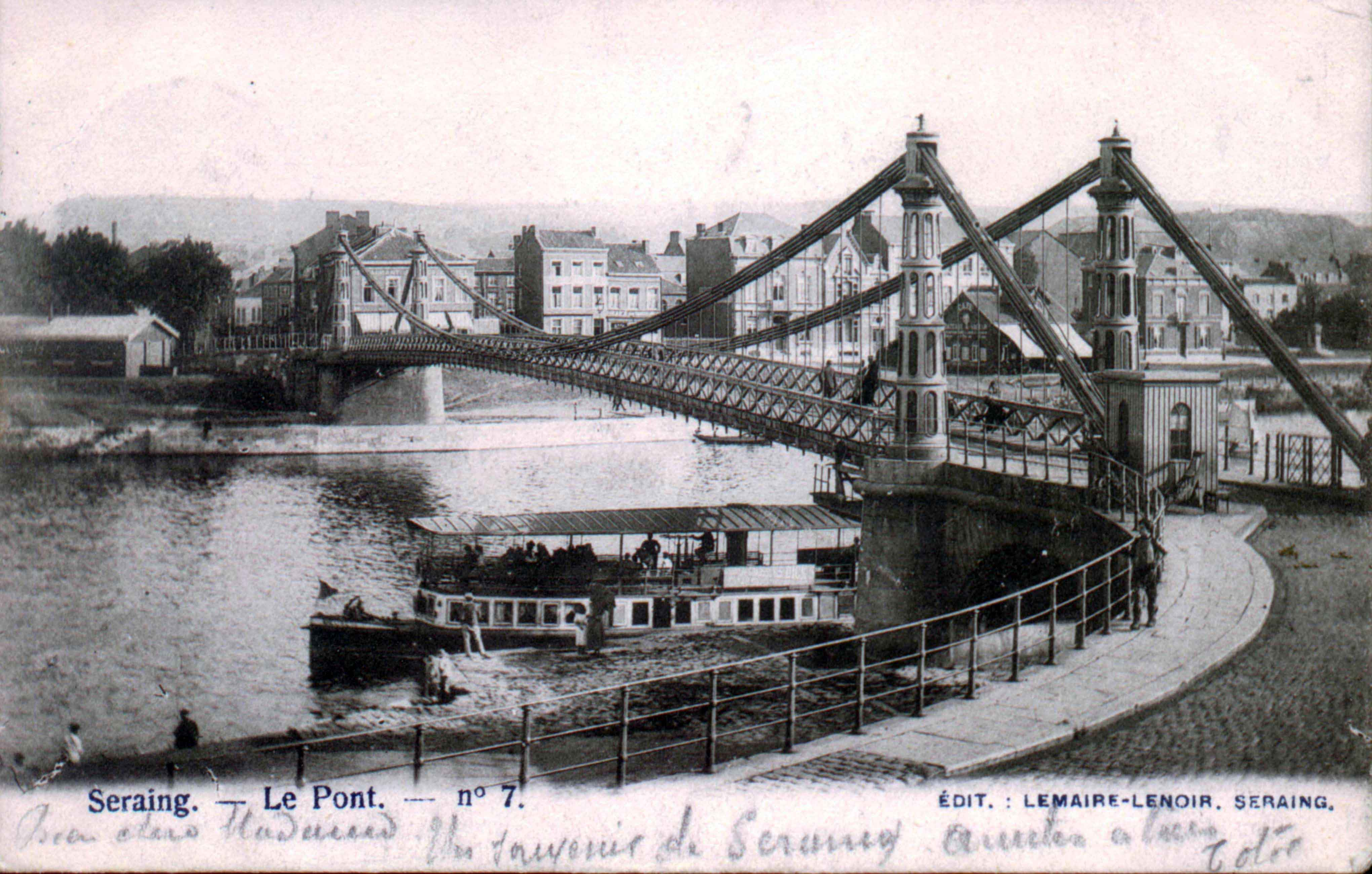
Bridge over the Meuse, in 1902

The first ironworks were founded there in 1809. John Cockerill and his brother James revolutionized the steel industry by using blast furnaces and coke instead of traditional charcoal. These inventions were the basis for the new company, John Cockerill & Cie established in Seraing in 1817.

== List of mayors ==
- 1977–1988: Guy Mathot (PS)
- 1988–1993: Gaston Onkelinx (PS)
- 1994–2000: Jacques Vandebosch (PS)
- 2000–2005: Guy Mathot (PS)
- 2005–2006: Jacques Vandebosch (PS)
- 2006–2018: Alain Mathot (PS)
- 2018–2023: Francis Bekaert (PS)
- 2023–present: Déborah Géradon (PS)

== Demographics ==
Group of origin	Year		Year		Year		Year	
Group of origin	2000		2010		2020		2026>	
Group of origin	Number	%	Number	%	Number	%	Number	%
Belgians with Belgian background	38,274	63,2	35,172	56,1	30,836	48	28,083	43,4
Belgians with foreign background	11,838	19,5	18,376	29,3	23,468	36,6	26,638	41,1
Neighbouring country	1,243	2,05	1,568	2,50	1,701	2,65	1,661	2,56
EU27 (excluding neighbouring country)	8,063	13,31	10,993	17,53	11,996	18,68	11,587	17,89
Outside EU 27	2,532	4,18	5,815	9,27	9,771	15,22	13,390	20,67
Non-Belgians	10,445	17,3	9,150	15,6	9,888	15,4	10,043	15,5
Neighbouring country	605	1,00	696	1,11	847	1,32	898	1,38
EU27 (excluding neighbouring country)	8,494	14,02	6,379	10,17	5,252	8,18	4,499	6,94
Outside EU 27	1,346	2,22	2,075	3,30	3,789	5,90	4,646	7,17
Total Population	60,557	100	62,698	100	64,192	100	64,764	100

== Sights ==
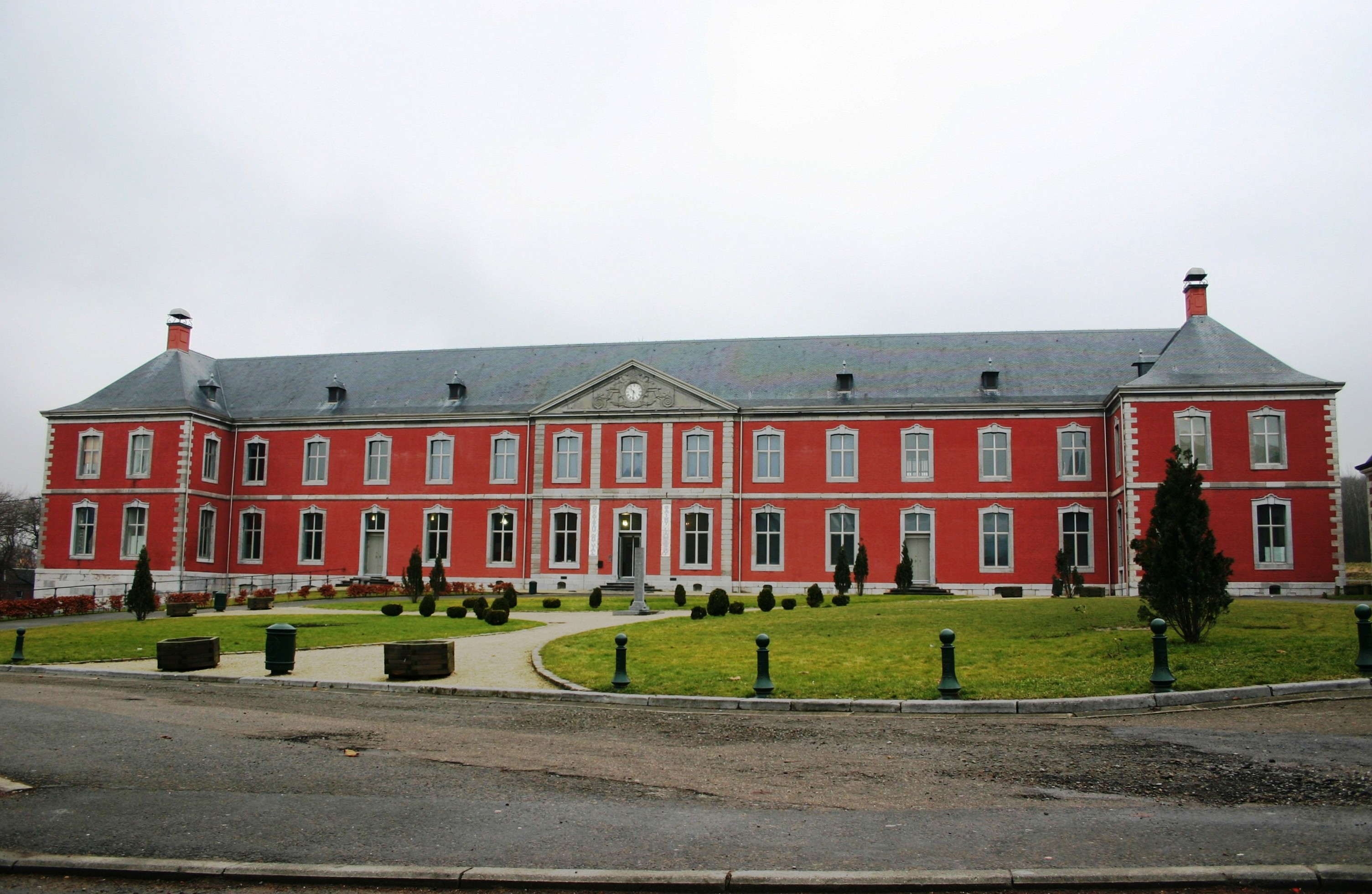
Val-Saint-Lambert Abbey

- The Val Saint Lambert crystal factory site includes the old Val-Saint-Lambert Abbey

== Notable people ==
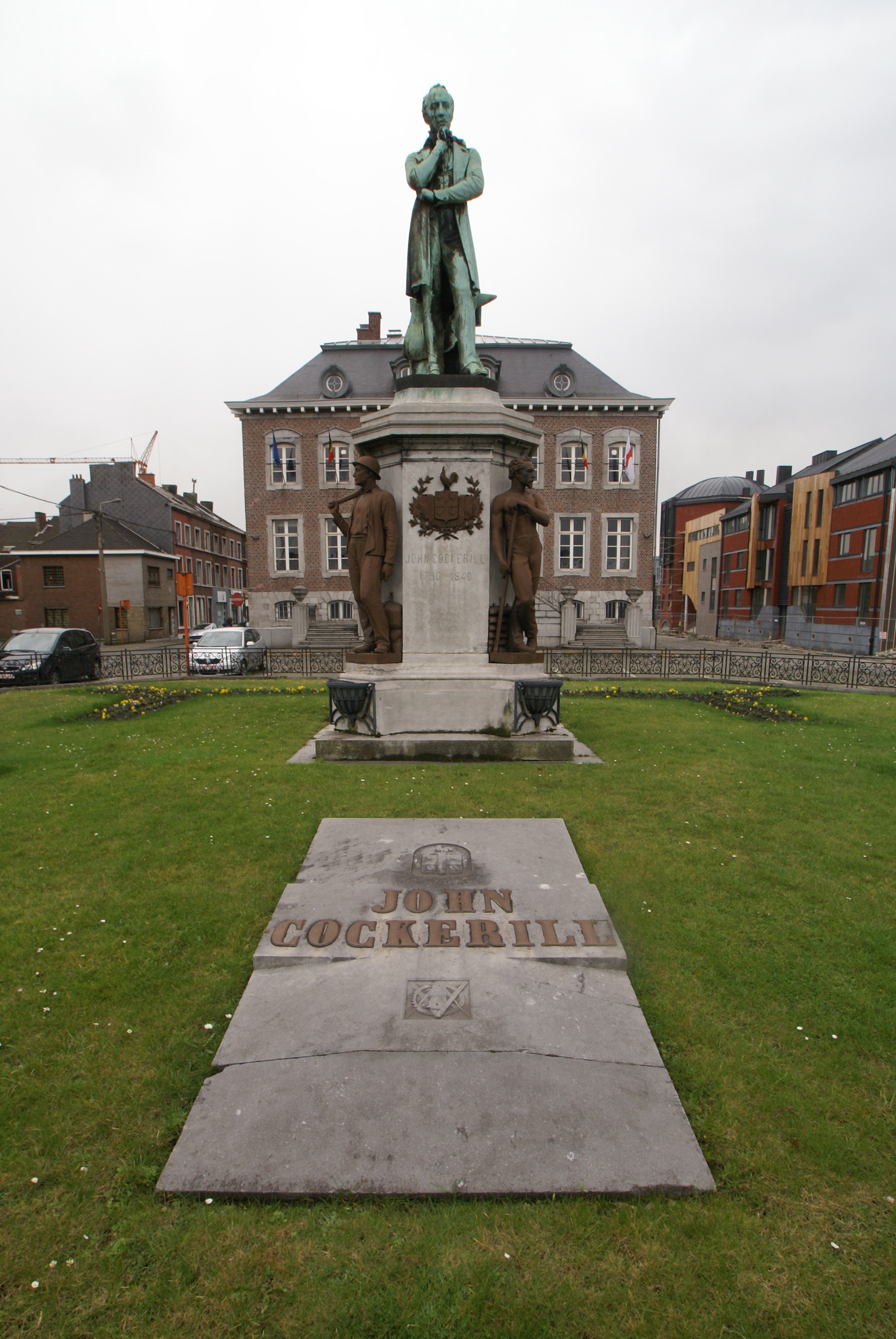
John Cockerill statue and tomb

- John Cockerill, British entrepreneur and founder of the Cockerill-Sambre steel company (1790–1840)
- Eugenio Barsanti, Italian inventor of the internal combustion engine (1821–1864)
- Leo Anton Karl de Ball, astronomer (1853–1916)
- Julien Lahaut, communist (1884–1950)
- Louis-Clément Picalausa, Scout novelist (1898–1969)
- Charles Lecocq (poet), (1901–1922)
- André Renard (Secretary-General of the General Federation of Belgian Labour and leader of the 60-61 General Strike) (1911–1962)
- Christian Piot, football goalkeeper (b. 1947)
- Jean-Pierre and Luc Dardenne, filmmakers (b. 1951 and 1954, resp.)
- Laurette Onkelinx, politician (b. 1958)
- Michel Preud'homme, football goalkeeper (b. 1959)
- Gilbert Bodart, football coach (b. 1962)
- Marc Tarabella, politician (b. 1963)
- Fabrizio Cassol, saxophone and aulochrome player (b. 1964)
- Marc Laho, opera singer (b. 1965)
- Alain Mathot, politician (b. 1972)
- Michaël Goossens, football striker (b. 1973)
- Viktor Klonaridis, football player (b. 1992)
- John Wartique, racing driver (b. 1990)

== International relations ==
=== Twin towns—Sister cities ===
Seraing is twinned with:

- France: Douai
- Italy: Rimini
- France: Châtel

== See also ==
- Liège Science Park
- The Dardenne brothers' films L'Enfant and Deux jours, une nuit
