= World War II reparations =

Reparations paid by Germany

After World War II, both West Germany and East Germany were obliged to pay war reparations to the Allied governments, according to the Potsdam Conference. Italian, Romanian, Hungarian, Bulgarian and Finnish reparations were determined in the Paris Peace Treaties. Austria was not included in any of these treaties, being seen as both a victim of and a contributor to German war crimes. Japan's reparations were determined in the Treaty of San Francisco.

== Payments ==
According to the Yalta Conference, no reparations to Allied countries would be paid in money (though that rule was not followed in later agreements). Instead, much of the value transferred consisted of German industrial assets as well as forced labour to the Allies. The Allied demands were further outlined during the Potsdam Conference. Reparations were to be directly paid to the four victor powers (France, United Kingdom, United States, and the Soviet Union); for the countries in the Soviet sphere of influence, the Soviet Union would determine its distribution. To coordinate the distribution of the reparations between the victor powers, the Allied Control Council was established.

The Allies finally agreed for German reparations to be paid in the following forms:

- Dismantling of the German industry
- Transferring all manufacturing equipment, machinery and machine tools to the Allies
- Transferring all railroad cars, locomotives and ships to the Allies
- Confiscation of all German investments abroad
- All gold, silver and platinum in bullion or coin form held by any person/institution in Germany
- All foreign currency
- All patents and research data relevant to military application and processes
- Requisition of current German industrial production and resource extraction
- Forced labour provided by the German population

To oversee the extraction and distribution of the German reparations in their control zone, the Western Allies established the Inter-Allied Reparations Agency (IARA). The distribution of the reparations from Germany was to be allotted by a pre-determined percentage to which the victor powers agreed to. German reparations were to be classified into two categories: A (all forms of German reparations except those included in Category B) and B (industrial and capital equipment, merchant ships, and inland water transports).

The following nations received reparations as part of the proceedings of the IARA:

Allotment of German reparations by the Western Allies
Country	% of Category A reparations	% of Category B reparations
Albania	0.05	0.35
Australia	0.70	0.95
Belgium	2.70	4.50
Czechoslovakia	3.00	4.30
Canada	3.50	1.50
Denmark	0.25	0.35
(Kingdom of Egypt) Egypt	0.05	0.20
France	16.00	22.80
Greece	2.70	3.35
(British Raj) India	2.00	2.90
Luxembourg	0.15	0.40
Norway	1.30	1.90
New Zealand	0.40	0.60
Netherlands	3.90	5.60
(Union of South Africa) South Africa	0.70	0.10
United Kingdom	28.00	27.80
United States	28.00	11.80
Yugoslavia	6.60	9.60

Poland was to be excluded from the proceedings of the IARA by demand from the Soviet Union. The Allies agreed as part of the Potsdam Agreement, that the Soviet Union collects and distributes the Polish share of reparations. Furthermore, the Soviet Union would extract its share of reparations mostly from the territory in its own occupation zone. The Provisional Polish Government concluded the Polish-Soviet Reparation Treaty on 16 August 1945. The treaty allocated Poland's share of confiscated German machinery, goods and raw materials. Furthermore Poland received 15% of the German merchant fleet acquired by the Soviet Union. Deliveries were overseen by a joint Polish-Soviet commission and lasted until 1953.

=== Territorial changes ===
During the Tehran Conference in November 1943, the Big Three agreed in principle to use the Curzon Line when determining Poland's eastern border, while in return Poland was entitled to a western border along the Oder.

The Soviet Union annexed the German territories east of the Oder-Neisse, leading to the expulsion of 12 million Germans (from East Prussia, Pomerania and Silesia). These territories were incorporated into communist Poland and the Soviet Union respectively and resettled with citizens of these countries, pending a final peace conference with Germany. Since a peace conference never took place, the areas were effectively ceded by Germany. In the case of Poland, the acquired territory was a compensation for the Polish Eastern Borderlands (Kresy), which were annexed by the Soviet Union.

France occupied the Saar protectorate from 1947 to 1956, with the intention of using its coal and steel industrial output to boost the French economy as reparations for the war. France sought to ultimately annex the Saar as well as the entire Ruhr region into France proper, but was denied so by the rest of the Allies. Following the results of a plebiscite, France had to relinquish its control of the Saar region on 1 January 1957.

The Netherlands sought to annex large parts of Western Germany as reparations for WWII. These efforts were mostly thwarted by the Western Allies and ultimately only approximately 69 square kilometres (27 sq mi) of German territory was annexed in 1949. Nearly all of these territories were returned to the Federal Republic of Germany in 1957. Under the Dutch-German treaty made in The Hague on 8 April 1960, West Germany agreed to pay to The Netherlands the sum of 280 million German marks in compensation for the return.

Belgium and Luxembourg also sought to annex German territory as reparations for WWII. However, only small areas were occupied and then returned after German compensation payments.

=== Dismantling of industries ===
At the beginning of the occupation, the Allies dismantled the remnants of German industries. Plants and machinery were dismantled, the railroad system deconstructed and everything was transported to the Allies. The German merchant fleet and all other ships were handed over. Foreign stocks of about 2.5 billion dollars were confiscated. The remaining German industries had to give up a share of their production to the Allies. Large shipments of steel, coal, but also other industrial products were seized and transported out of the country. Later the Western Allies softened their stance in favour of the Marshall Plan, while Eastern Germany continued to deliver industrial goods and raw materials to the Soviet Union until 1953.

=== Dismantling of rail infrastructure ===
In the Soviet Zone of Occupation (later the German Democratic Republic) virtually all double tracked rail lines were reduced to a single track with the material being taken to the Soviet Union. Similarly the (relatively limited) railway electrification was also dismantled with the notable exception of most of the Berlin S-Bahn which retained its third rail infrastructure for the most part.

Similarly, in the French Occupation Zone, key rail lines were dismantled to single track.

=== Intellectual property ===
The Allies confiscated large amounts of German patents, copyrights and trademarks worth about 10 billion (1948) dollars.

=== Forced labour ===
Millions of Germans were pressed into forced labour for several years to work for the Allies in camps, mining, harvesting or industry.

=== Occupation costs ===
After World War II ended, the main four Allied powers – Great Britain, The United States, France, and the Soviet Union – jointly occupied Germany, with the Allied occupation officially ending in the 1950s. During this time, Germany was held accountable for the Allied occupation's expenses, amounting to over several billion dollars.

=== Holocaust victims ===
Germany concluded a variety of treaties with Western and Eastern countries as well as the Jewish Claims Conference and the World Jewish Congress to compensate the victims of the Holocaust. Until 2005 about 63 billion euros (equivalent to approximately 87.9 billion euros in 2022) have been paid to individuals. Additional payments by German companies which exploited forced workers have been made.

== Recipients ==
=== Poland ===
==== Payments ====
From 1946 to 1953, the SBZ and East Germany shipped goods and industrial resources to Poland as part of the Soviet Union's reparations share, under the Polish-Soviet reparations agreement of 16 August 1945. Poland also received its share of the German merchant fleet, amounting to 14 seagoing ships totalling about 52,000 GRT as well as a few auxiliary and unfinished vessels. These included SS Olsztyn, ORP Gryf, SS Jagiełło and SS Kolno. The total value of reparations paid by East Germany to Poland amounted to US$10.2 billion in 1938 dollars, equivalent to US$180.54 billion in inflation-adjusted 2018 dollars.

Beginning in 1972, West Germany concluded several bilateral treaties with Poland aimed at directly compensating victims of Nazi Germany. Victims of pseudo-medical experiments received 100 million Deutsche Mark in compensation. In 1975, as a result of the Helsinki Accords negotiations, West Germany paid 700 million Deutsche Mark to Poles who had paid into the German social security system during the Nazi occupation but received no pension. An additional 600 million Deutsche Mark was paid to Poland as "political compensation". Furthermore, Poland received a long-term loan of 1 billion Deutsche Mark on favourable interest terms. Payments to Polish Holocaust victims as part of the 1980 "Hardship Fund" of the Claims Conference amounted to about 500 million Deutsche Mark.

Unified Germany established several foundations to provide additional compensation. The Foundation for Polish-German Reconciliation paid 500 million Deutsche Mark to victims of Nazism. An additional €42.7 million was provided by the Austrian "Reconciliation, Peace and Cooperation" fund. The Foundation Remembrance, Responsibility and Future paid a total of €1.232 billion in compensation to former concentration camp inmates and civilian forced labourers.

==== History and political developments ====
On 23 August 1953, the People's Republic of Poland, under pressure from the Soviet Union which wanted to free East Germany from any liabilities, announced it would waive its right to further war reparations from East Germany on 1 January 1954. In a United Nations note, dated 24 November 1969, the communist government of Poland demanded action from the organization not only to punish war criminals and those who have committed crimes against humanity but also to establish procedures and divisibility of compensation for war crimes and damages committed by Germany during World War II. In 1970, the 1953 renunciation of reparation rights was confirmed by the Polish Deputy Minister of Foreign Affairs Józef Winiewicz during the course of the negotiations leading to the normalization treaty of November 1970, in which West Germany recognized the Oder-Neisse as the final border between Poland and East Germany.

On 10 September 2004, the Polish parliament (Sejm) passed a resolution stating that: "The Sejm of the Republic of Poland, aware of the role of historical truth and elementary justice in Polish-German relations states that Poland has not yet received adequate financial compensation and war reparations for the enormous destruction and material losses caused by German aggression, occupation and genocide." A month later, on 19 October 2004 the Polish Council of Ministers put out a statement stating: "The Declaration of 23 August 1953 was adopted in accordance with the constitutional order of the time, in compliance with international law laid down in the UN Charter." In August 2017, this position was again confirmed in a statement by Deputy Foreign Minister Marek Magierowski, stating that "(...) the 1953 declaration constitutes a binding unilateral legal act of the Polish state – a subject of international law." According to law professor at the University of Warsaw, Władysłav Czapliński, the reparation question has been closed with the conclusion of the Treaty on the Final Settlement with Respect to Germany, negotiated in 1990 between the Federal Republic of Germany, the German Democratic Republic, and the Four Powers (United States, Soviet Union, United Kingdom, and France), to which Poland voiced no protest. The German government takes the same position.

The reparation issue arose again in late 2017 with comments made by Polish government officials from the ruling Law and Justice. Since then, the Polish government has taken the position that Poland's 1953 refusal is non-binding because the country was under the sway of the Soviet Union. Przemysław Sobolewski, head of the Bureau of Research of the Sejm, said that the political decision of 1953 was made by the Polish Council of Ministers, even though under the Constitution of the Polish People's Republic, which came into force in 1952, it was the Polish Council of State, which had the sole authority to undertake such a decision. According to Józef Menes from the Council of the Polish War Loss Institute, no diplomatic note was presented to the East German government and that "Probably the meeting of the Council of Ministers of 23 August 1953 did not take place at all" - citing relation of Kazimierz Mijal (head of the office of the Council of Ministers from 21 November 1952 to 1 February 1956).

On the 83rd anniversary of the outbreak of World War II, on 1 September 2022, a Polish government report on Poland's war losses and damages between 1939 and 1945 was presented at the Royal Castle in Warsaw. The three volume report also covered the legal issues regarding the 1953 renunciation of reparation rights by Poland, and according to the report findings: "the alleged unilateral statement of the Council of Ministers of 23 August 1953 on the renunciation of war reparations by the People's Republic of Poland violated the constitution of 22 July 1952 in force at that time, because the matters of ratification and termination of international agreements belonged to the competence of the Council of State, not the Council of Ministers". Also, the report noted that according to the minutes of the Council of Ministers of 19 August 1953, the renunciation concerned only the German Democratic Republic not the Federal Republic, and that no diplomatic note was ever sent to the East German government officially informing it of Poland's decision. On 14 September 2022 the Sejm passed (418 for, 4 against, 15 abstentions) a resolution stating that: "The Polish state has never renounced its claims against the German state; the Sejm of the Republic of Poland calls on the German government to assume political, historical, legal, and financial responsibility for all the effects caused by the unleashing of World War II."

On 2 October 2022, the Polish Foreign Minister Zbigniew Rau signed a diplomatic note asking the German government to undertake an official negotiation process between Poland and Germany, and on 3 October presented the diplomatic note to the visiting German Foreign Minister Annalena Baerbock. According to the German government, there is no legal basis for further compensation payments. On 4 January 2023 the deputy minister of foreign affairs of Poland Arkadiusz Mularczyk stated that "We do not recognize this German position, we reject it in its entirety as absolutely unfounded and erroneous." and "the German state cannot close a case that has never (yet) been opened".

Polish President Karol Nawrocki advocates for pursuing World War II reparations from Germany. On a WW2 anniversary on 1 September 2025, Nawrocki "unequivocally" demanded Germany pays Poland war reparations worth over 6 trillion PLN (1.4 trillion Euros), continuing the course set by the Law and Justice party. During a visit to Germany in September 2025, Nawrocki attempted to discuss the topic of war reparations, but was rejected, with Germany stating that the matter of war reparations is "definitively regulated". An alternative solution to paying war reparations proposed by Nawrocki was for Poland to receive financial aid for its military industry.

=== Greece ===
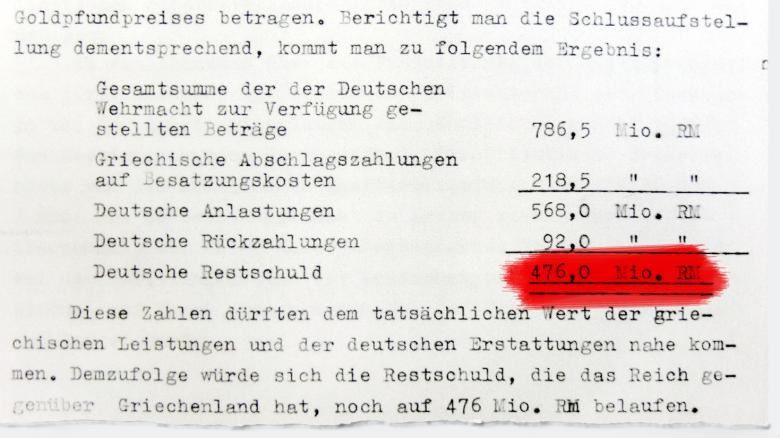
Excerpt Akte R 27320, page 114 (political archive of the German Federal Foreign Office)

As a result of the Nazi German occupation, much of Greece was subjected to enormous destruction of its industry (80% of which was destroyed), infrastructure (28% destroyed), ports, roads, railways and bridges (90%), forests and other natural resources (25%) and loss of civilian life (7.02–11.17% of its citizens). Other sources put the total number of deaths resulting from the Axis occupation at 273,000 to 747,000 Greeks, or 3.7-10.2% of the prewar population. The occupying Nazi regime forced Greece to pay the cost of the occupation in the country and requisite raw materials and food for the occupation forces, creating the conditions for the Great Famine. Furthermore, in 1942, the Greek Central Bank was forced by the occupying Nazi regime to lend 476 million Reichsmarks at 0% interest to Nazi Germany.

After the war, Greece received its share of the reparations paid by Germany to the Allies as part of the proceedings of the Paris Reparation Treaty of 1946 which the Inter-Allied Reparations Agency enforced. 7.181 million dollars were initially slated for Greece. This sum rose significantly due to the growing size of the reparations seized by the Allies and Greece ultimately received compensations in the form of money and industrial goods with a worth of about 25 million dollars.

Greece received an additional share of reparations from other Axis powers as a result of the Paris Peace Treaties from 1947.

Greece was a signatory of the London Agreement on German External Debts in 1953. The signatories agreed to postpone additional German debts until a final peace treaty with Germany would be made. In 1960, Germany concluded a treaty with the Greek government to compensate Greek victims of Nazi German terror which amounted to 115 Million German mark. These payments were explicitly marked as payments to the victims and were not supposed to be a general reparation treaty. Later Greek governments insist that this was only a down payment and further payments need to be made.

In 1990, West Germany and East Germany signed the Treaty on the Final Settlement with Respect to Germany ('Two Plus Four Agreement') with the former Allied countries of the United States, United Kingdom, France, and the Soviet Union. This treaty was supposed to close all open questions regarding Germany and the aftermath of WWII and paved the way for German reunification. Germany considers this treaty as the final regulation which concludes the question of open reparations which had been made in previous treaties such as the London Debt Agreement. Greece rejects this notion and on 8 February 2015, the then-Greek Prime Minister, Alexis Tsipras demanded that Germany pay the "complete" reparations to Greece. In April 2015, Greece evaluated the war reparations to be the equivalent of 278.7 billion euros (equivalent to 389 billion euros in 2022). While more German politicians and members of the Bundestag are calling on the federal government to compensate Greece financially for the effects of the Nazi occupation, the German government replied that the stipulations of the Two Plus Four treaty still stand and the issue was resolved in 1990.

=== Israel ===
West Germany paid reparations to Israel for confiscated Jewish property under Nuremberg laws, forced labour and persecution. Payments to Israel until 1987 amounted to about 14 billion dollars, equivalent to $36.5 billion in 2022.

=== The Netherlands ===
Immediately after the end of the war, the Netherlands demanded 25 billion Guilders as compensation for among other things the Dutch winter famine of 1944–1945. But shortly later pursued a policy of radical redrawing of the longstanding Dutch-German border and the transfer of a large part of German territory to the Dutch as reparations. In its most ambitious form, this plan included the annexation of the cities and surroundings of Cologne, Aachen, Münster and Osnabrück. Subsequently, the Dutch government seized and annexed 69 square kilometres (27 sq mi) of border territory from Allied occupied Germany in 1949, almost all of which was returned to West Germany in 1963 in exchange for 280 million Deutschmarks paid by the Federal German government to the Dutch.

=== Yugoslavia ===
In accordance with the Paris Agreement (24th January 1946), the Federal Republic of Germany should pay the Socialist Federal Republic of Yugoslavia $36 billion as compensation for war damage. Of this amount, Yugoslavia received $36 million, in the form of machinery and transport equipment from the dismantled German factories. West Germany also paid 8 million German marks as reparations for forced human experimentation on Yugoslav citizens, and 26 million German marks as compensation from social insurance demands for workers, who were used as forced labour in Germany during the Second World War.

=== Soviet Union ===
The Soviet Union received compensation under the Paris Peace Treaty in 1947 from four Axis allied powers, in addition to the large reparations paid to the Soviet Union by the Soviet Occupation Zone in Germany and the eventual German Democratic Republic in the form of machinery (entire factories were dismantled and shipped to the Soviet Union) as well as food, industrial products, and consumer goods. The USSR was owed $100 million from Italy, $300 million from Finland, $200 million from Hungary, and $300 million from Romania, amounting to approximately $12 billion in total in 2022.

=== Bilateral compensation agreements ===
The Bilateral Compensation Agreements for Victims of the Nazi Regime were signed in the late 1950s and early 1960s between West Germany and twelve Western European countries: Austria, Belgium, Denmark, France, Greece, Italy, Luxembourg, the Netherlands, Norway, Sweden, Switzerland and the United Kingdom, to compensate victims of the Nazi regime. In the bilateral agreements Germany settled on paying DM 876 million. Because of these agreements Germany denied financial liability for subsequent compensation claims by war crime victims and their family members in subsequent court cases.

== Other Axis nations ==
Italian reparation payments amounted to about 366 million USD and were paid to the Soviet Union, Greece, Yugoslavia, Albania, and Ethiopia. Finland, Romania and Hungary had to pay reparations worth about 300 million USD each, mostly paid in natural goods. Bulgaria had to pay reparations worth about 70 million USD. Most of these reparations were not paid in full by the countries which later fell under the umbrella of the Soviet Union, because the Soviet Union officially cancelled them.

Japan paid its reparations similar to Germany through dismantling of industrial equipment, delivery of raw materials and confiscation of industrial output. Only minor payments were made to other Asian countries, specifically to Burma, Cambodia, Indonesia, Laos, Philippines, South Korea, Vietnam, and Thailand. Overall Japanese reparations amounted to about 1.5 billion US dollars which was about 4% of its GDP.

== See also ==
- World War I reparations
- Allied-occupied Germany
- Flight and expulsion of Germans (1944–50)
- Morgenthau plan
- International Authority for the Ruhr
- Allied plans for German industry after World War II
- Operation Osoaviakhim
- Operation Paperclip
- London Agreement on German External Debts
- Wirtschaftswunder

== Bibliography ==
- Cook, Bernhard A. (2013). Europe Since 1945. Vol. 1. New York: Routledge - Taylor & Francis. ISBN 9780815313366.
- Dieter-Müller, Rolf (2008). Der Zusammenbruch des Deutschen Reiches 1945. Die Folgen des Zweiten Weltkrieges [The Collapse of Germany 1945 and the Results of the Second World War: The Resolution of the Wehrmacht and the Consequences of the War]. Germany and the Second World War (in German). Vol. 10/2. Militärgeschichtliches Forschungsamt. Deutsche Verlags-Anstalt. ISBN 978-3421043382.
- Hinrichsen, Simon (2023). When Nations Can't Default. Cambridge University Press. ISBN 978-1-009-34392-3.
- Roth, Karl-Heinz; Rübner, Hartmut (2022). Repressed, Remitted, Rejected: German Reparations Debts to Poland and Greece. New York: Berghahn Books. ISBN 978-1800732575.
- Rumpf, Helmut (1973). "Die deutsche Frage und die Reparationen" [The German question and reparations] (PDF). Heidelberg Journal of International Law. 33. Max Planck Institute for Comparative Public Law and International Law: 344–371.
- Wehler, Hans-Ulrich (1987). Deutsche Gesellschaftsgeschichte [German civil history] (in German). Vol. 4. Munich: C.H. Beck. ISBN 9783406322648.
- Hannu Heikkilä, The Question of European Reparations in Allied Policy, 1943-1947
