= Greater Luxembourg =

Greater Luxembourg may refer to:

- Duchy of Luxembourg
- Luxembourg (Belgium)
- Luxembourg annexation plans after the Second World War
- Greater Region of SaarLorLux

== See also ==
- Partitions of Luxembourg
