= Steling =

Mountain on the German-Belgian border

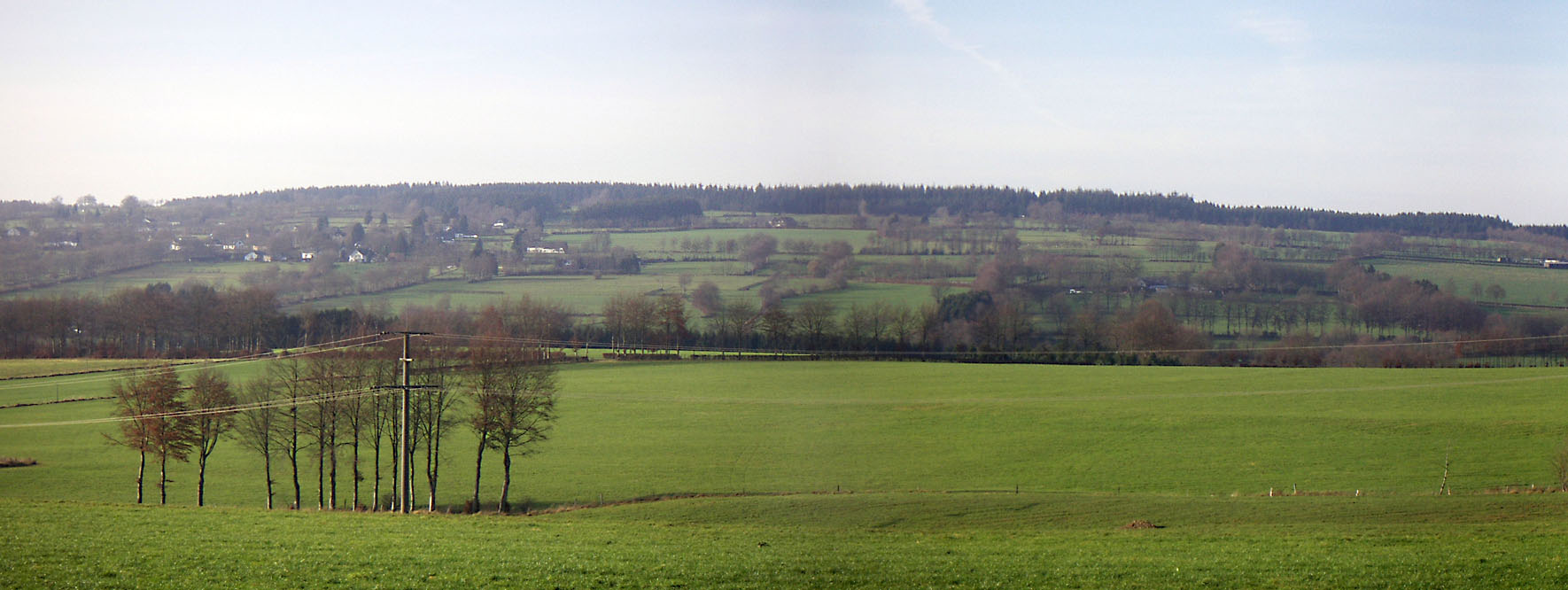
- Steling

Highest point
- Elevation: 658.3 m (2,160 ft)
- Coordinates: 50°34′43″N 6°12′43″E

Geography
- Location within Belgium
- Location: Liège Province, Belgium. Near the border of North Rhine-Westphalia, Germany
- Parent range: Eifel

The Steling is a mountain 658.3 m above sea level (NN) on the High Fens plateau. The German-Belgian border runs 60 meters from the mountaintop. The closest borderpoint near the summit is also the highest point in the municipal region of Aachen.

== Location ==
The Steling is located on the western edge of the High Fens-Eifel Nature Park. At its southern foot lies Mützenich, a quarter of Monschau. On its northern slopes is the source region of the River Weser, which flows through the Weser Dam near Eupen to Liège and into the Ourthe.

== Climate ==
The High Fens to the south and west benefit from the Steling, because the summit causes moist Atlantic winds to release their rainfall on the mountain.

== Tourism and information ==
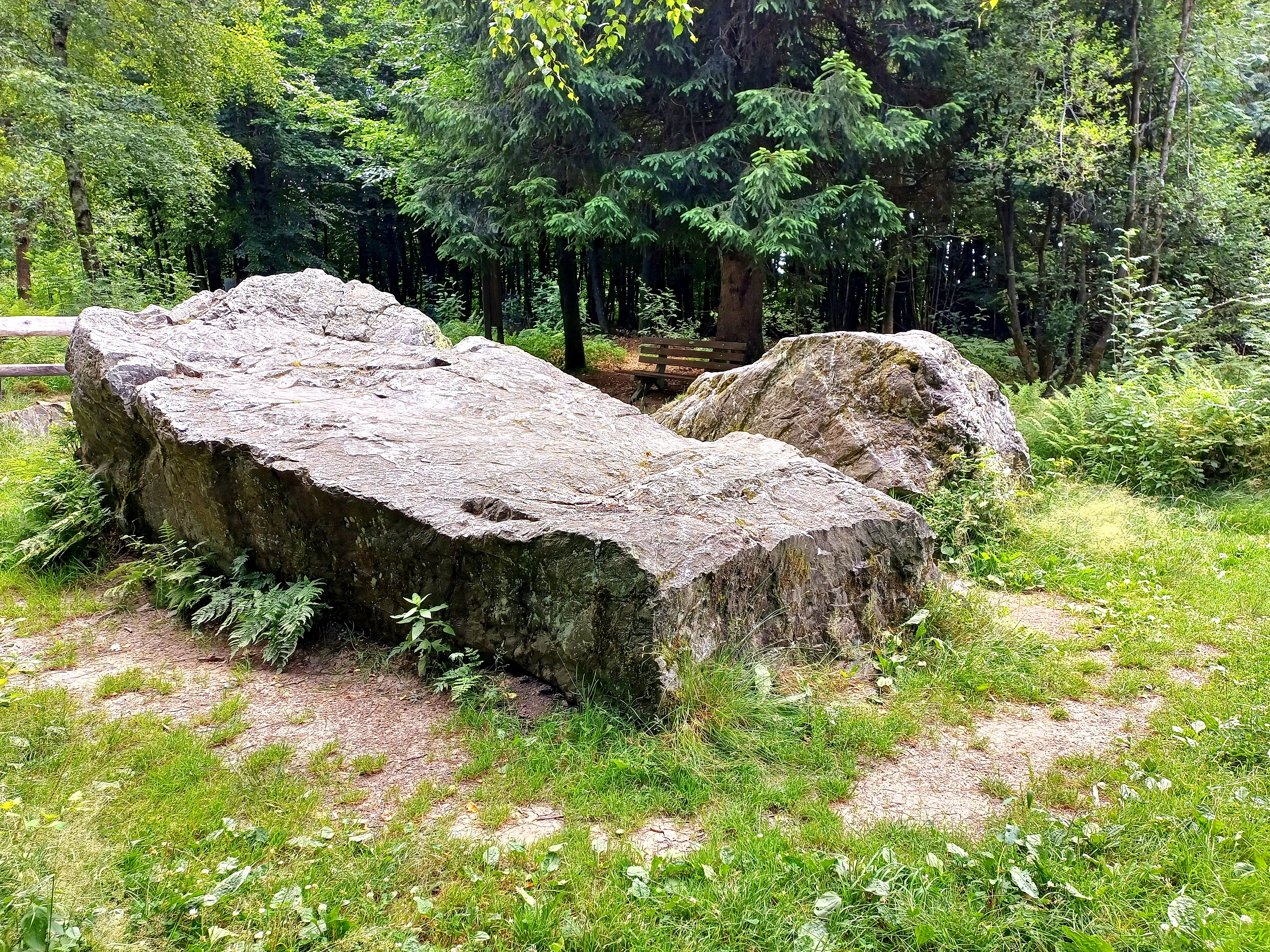
Emperor Charles' Bed

About 700 metres southwest of the highest point on the mountain is a tourist attraction: the striking quartzite rocks known as Emperor Charles' Bed (Kaiser Karls Bettstatt).

On the mountain and its surrounding pastures may be seen field hedges of beech, typical of the Monschau Hedge Land, which are used to enclose the grazing pastures and hay meadows.

From the top of the Steling there is a view of the North Eifel and, in clear weather, visitors can see as far as the Siebengebirge near Bonn and Cologne Cathedral.

On the Steling there is a private weather station for the Rureifel and Monschau region, whose services are used by the surrounding villages.
