= Belgium–Germany border =

International border

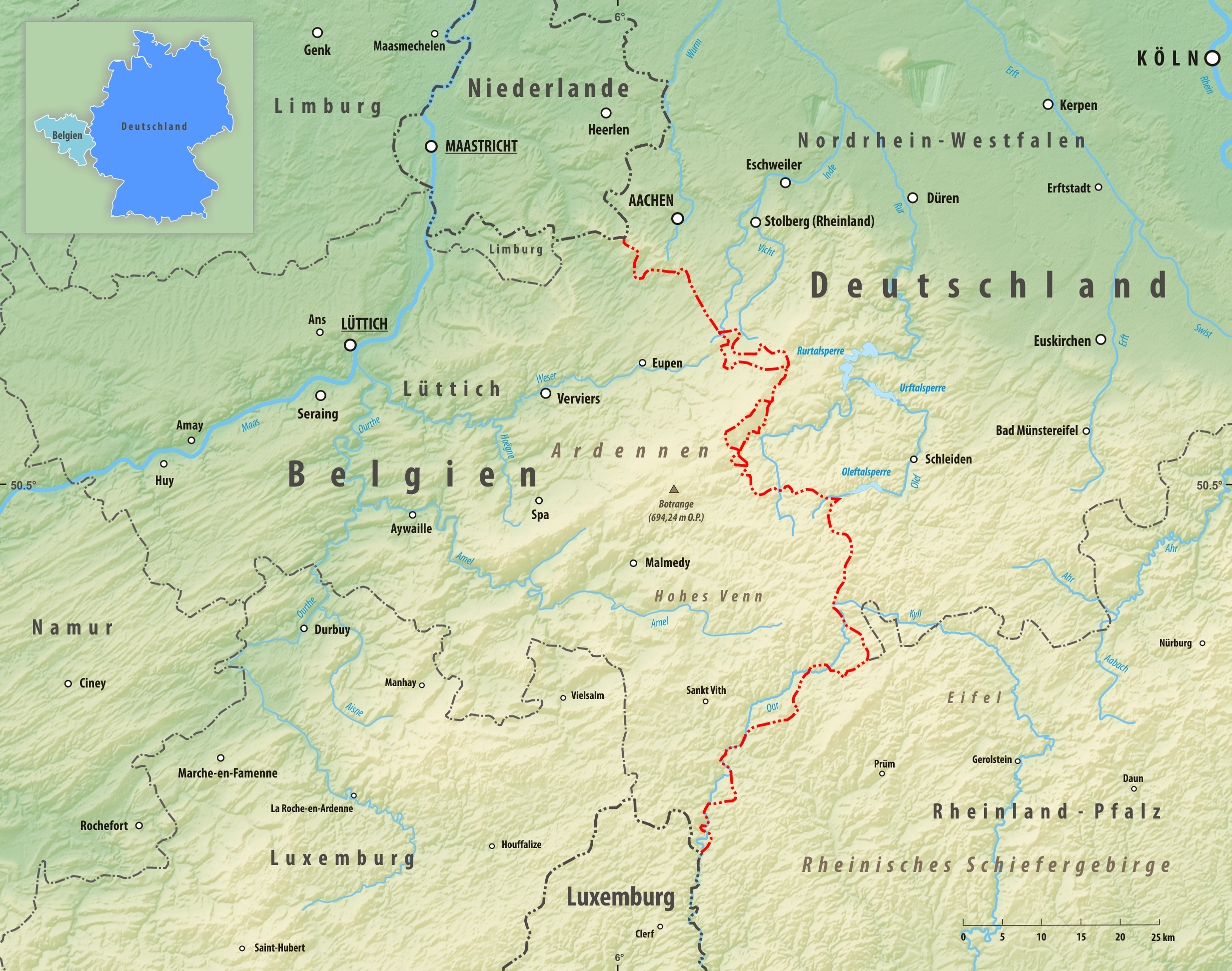
The Belgium-Germany border.

The border between the modern states of Belgium and Germany has a length of 204 km (127 mi).

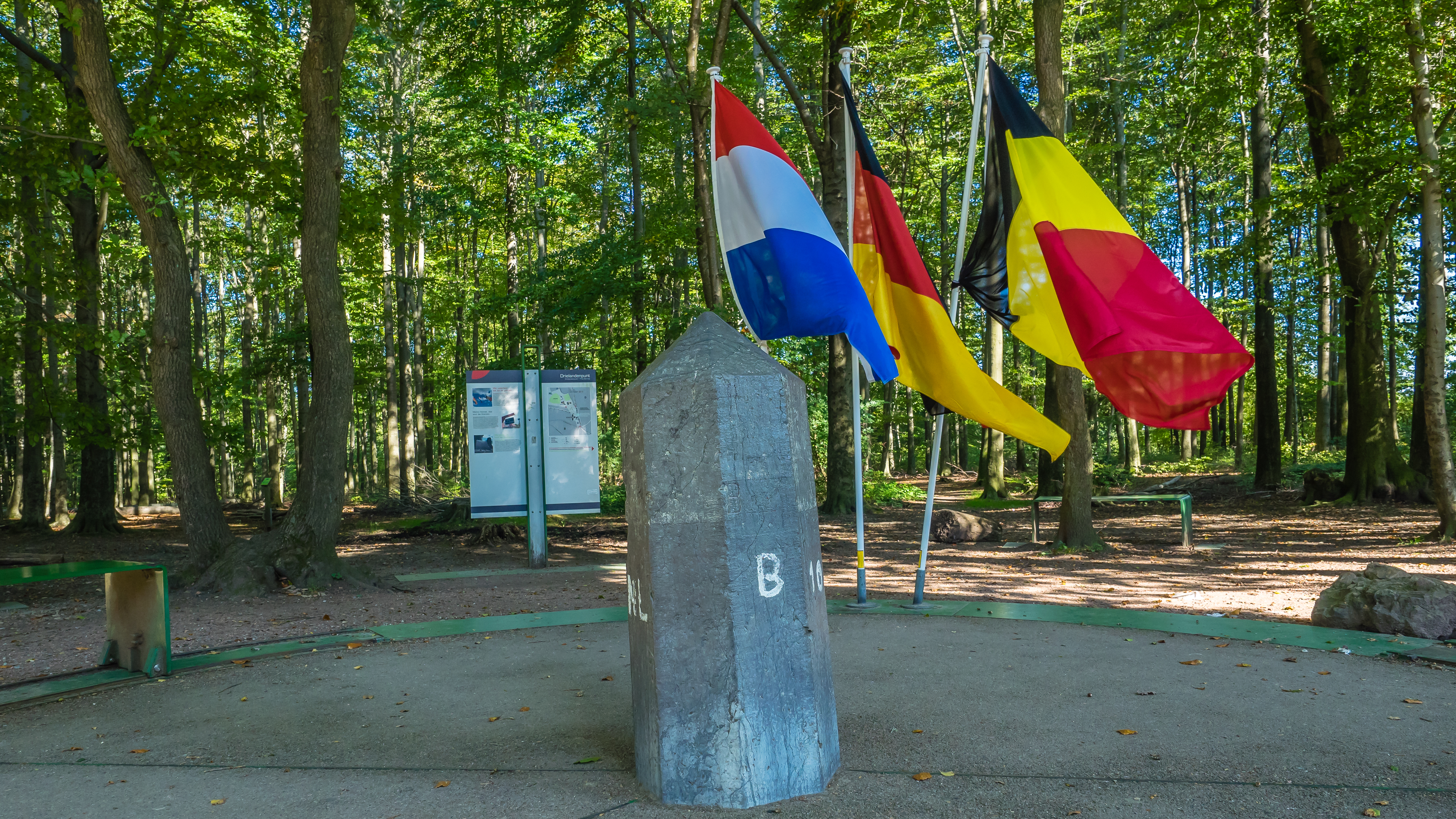
The tri-point where Germany, Belgium and the Netherlands meet.

== Crossings ==
The Belgium–Germany border is crossed by two railways, the railway between Liège and Aachen, as well as the railway between Tongeren and Aachen. There are around 20 public roads which cross the border, of them 2 motorways (controlled-access highways), A3/A44/E40 and A27/A60/E42.

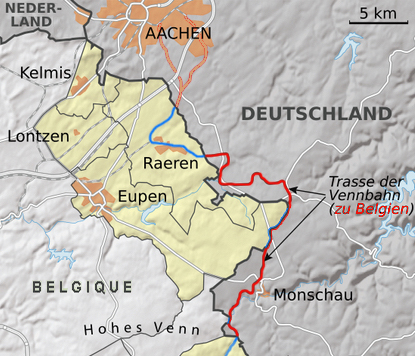
The route of the now defunct Vennbahn railway.

== Vennbahn ==
One specific feature of the border is the route of the Vennbahn railway. The Vennbahn railway route has been Belgian territory since 1919, under the provisions of the Treaty of Versailles. The Treaty decided that the former German area of Eupen-Malmedy should be ceded to Belgium, along with the entire Vennbahn railway route which crossed the border several times. Border stones can be found on the right and left of the route. Due to the route of the now defunct railway, six exclaves of Germany, completely surrounded by Belgian territory, as well as one counter-enclave, were created. Today five German enclaves remain surrounded by Belgian territory, consisting of the village Mützenich as well as parts of the districts of Monschaus and Roetgens. Following land swaps, the sixth enclave and the Belgian counter-enclave no longer exist.

== Border formalities ==
Both countries belong to the Schengen Area and the European Union Customs Union. There have been no customs checks as such since 1968 and no systematic passport checks since 1995.

== See also ==
- Belgium–Germany relations
