= Vennbahn =

Former railway line in Northern Europe

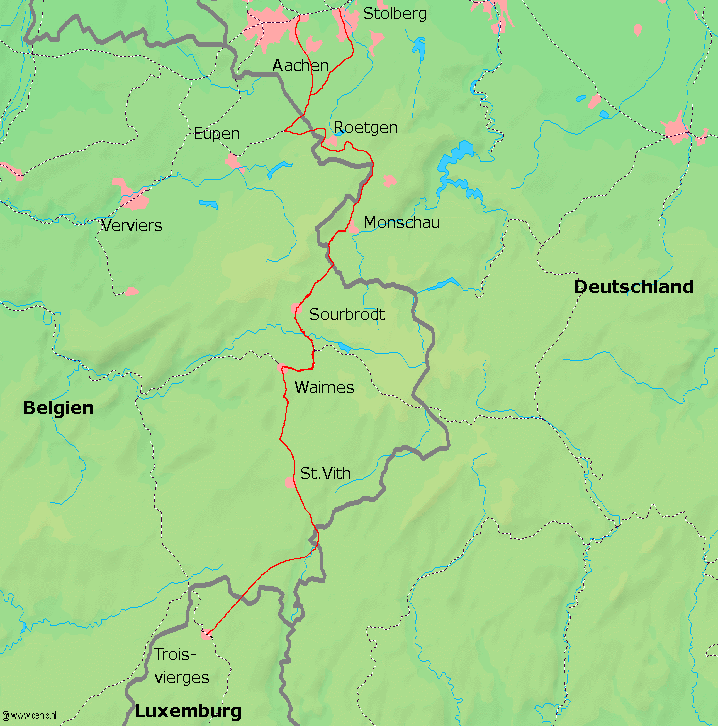
Vennbahn Map showing current Belgian-German border. The pre-1958 border southeast of Roetgen differed.

The Vennbahn (German pronunciation: [ˈfɛnbaːn], "Fen Railway") is a former railway line that was built partly across what was then German territory by the Prussian state railways. It is now entirely in Belgium, because the trackbed of the line, as well as the stations and other installations, were made provisional Belgian territory in 1919 (permanent in 1922) under an article of the Treaty of Versailles.

This created six small exclaves of Germany on the line's western side, of which five remain. The treaty (not the location of the trackbed, per se) also created one small Belgian counter-enclave, a traffic island inside a three-way German road intersection near Fringshaus which lasted until 1949.

The route is now a cycle way.

== Route ==
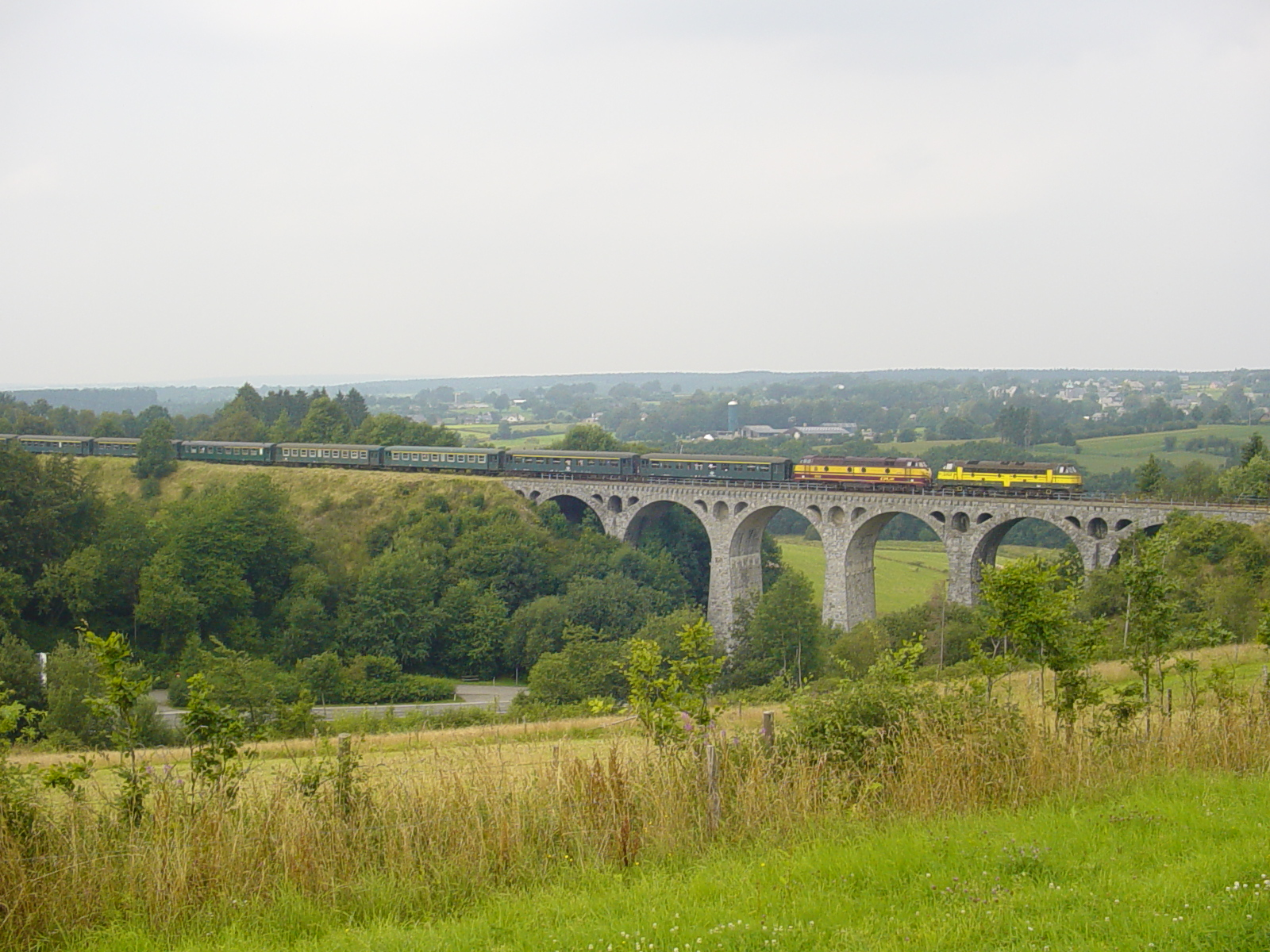
Vennbahn viaduct near Bütgenbach, Liège province, Belgium.

The line, which was standard gauge, ran for some 75 kilometres (47 mi) across the High Fens to the south of Aachen in a roughly southward direction from Aachen via Raeren (the site of the depot), Monschau and Malmedy to Trois-Ponts, with a 20 km (12 mi) eastward branch from Oberweywertz to Bütgenbach and Losheim (Hellenthal). At Eupen it connected with the line to Herbesthal where it joined the Brussels-Cologne main line. At Trois-Ponts it connected with the Liège-Luxembourg line.

Its part, when and where under Belgian control, was known officially as Belgian Railway line 48.

== History ==
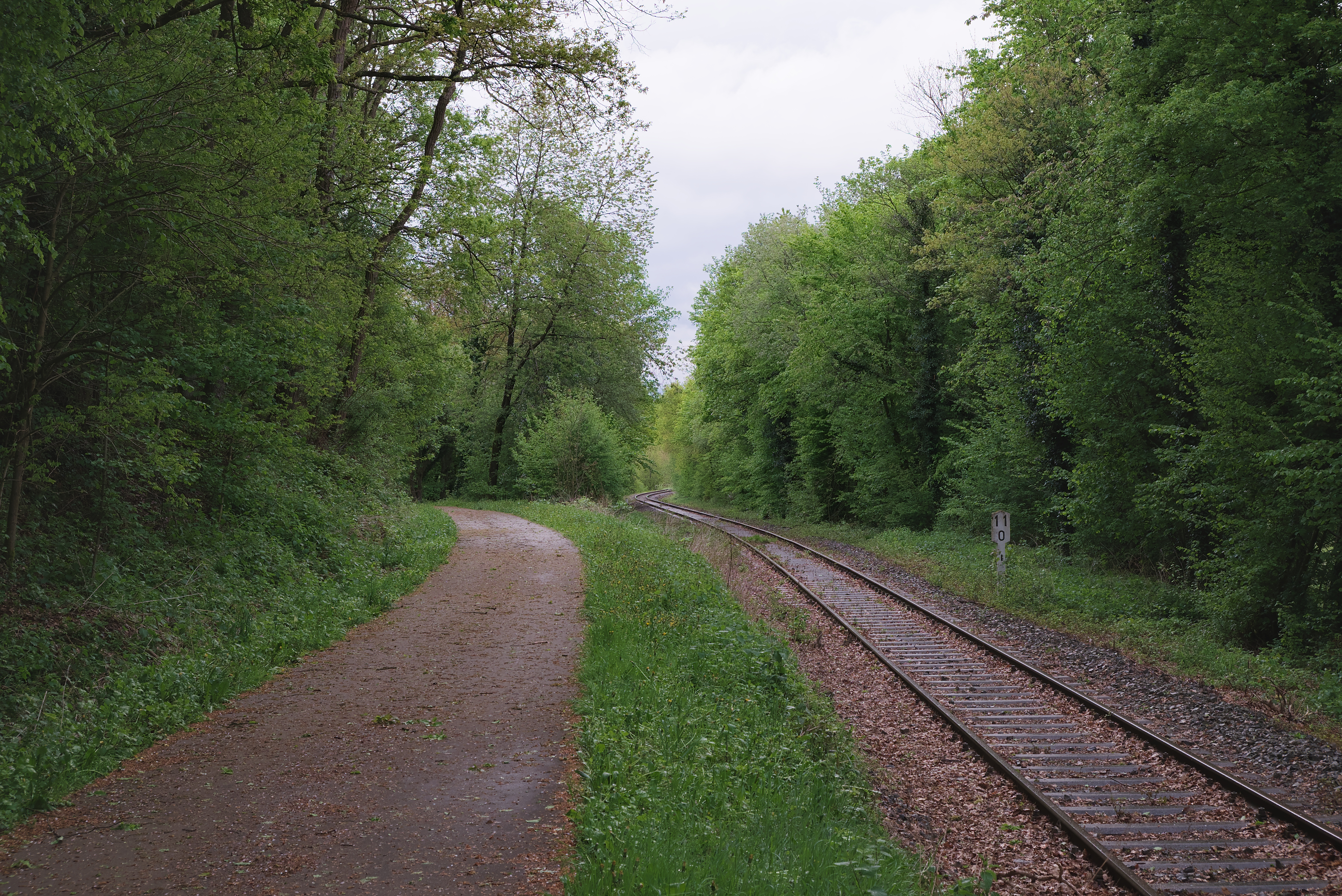
The former track is now part of a bicycle network

The line was built to carry coal and iron. The section of the line from Aachen to Monschau was opened on 30 June 1885. The section from Raeren to Eupen was opened on 3 August 1887. The link to Walheim was opened on 21 December 1889.

After the First World War due to the Treaty of Versailles, the German Reich had to cede districts of Eupen and Malmedy to Belgium on 10 January 1920. As a consequence of the new border demarcation, the route of the line now changed several times between the German Reich territory and Belgium. Belgium demanded that the Vennbahn be placed under Belgian administration, as it was of particular economic importance for the towns of Malmedy and Eupen, and succeeded. On 27 March 1920, a border demarcation commission, which included representatives from France, the United Kingdom, Italy and Japan, determined that the Belgian state should be the owner of the railway line and its stations. At the time this generated six German exclaves, five of which still exist today.

On 18 May 1940 Adolf Hitler ordered that the area be re-annexed by the German Reich, and the Vennbahn was returned to service as a wholly German line on 2 June 1940. However, after the defeat of Germany in 1945, the pre-war situation was re-instated.

After the Second World War, the railway's industrial use declined steadily, so that the line was finally completely shut down and partially dismantled by 1989.

=== Operation ===
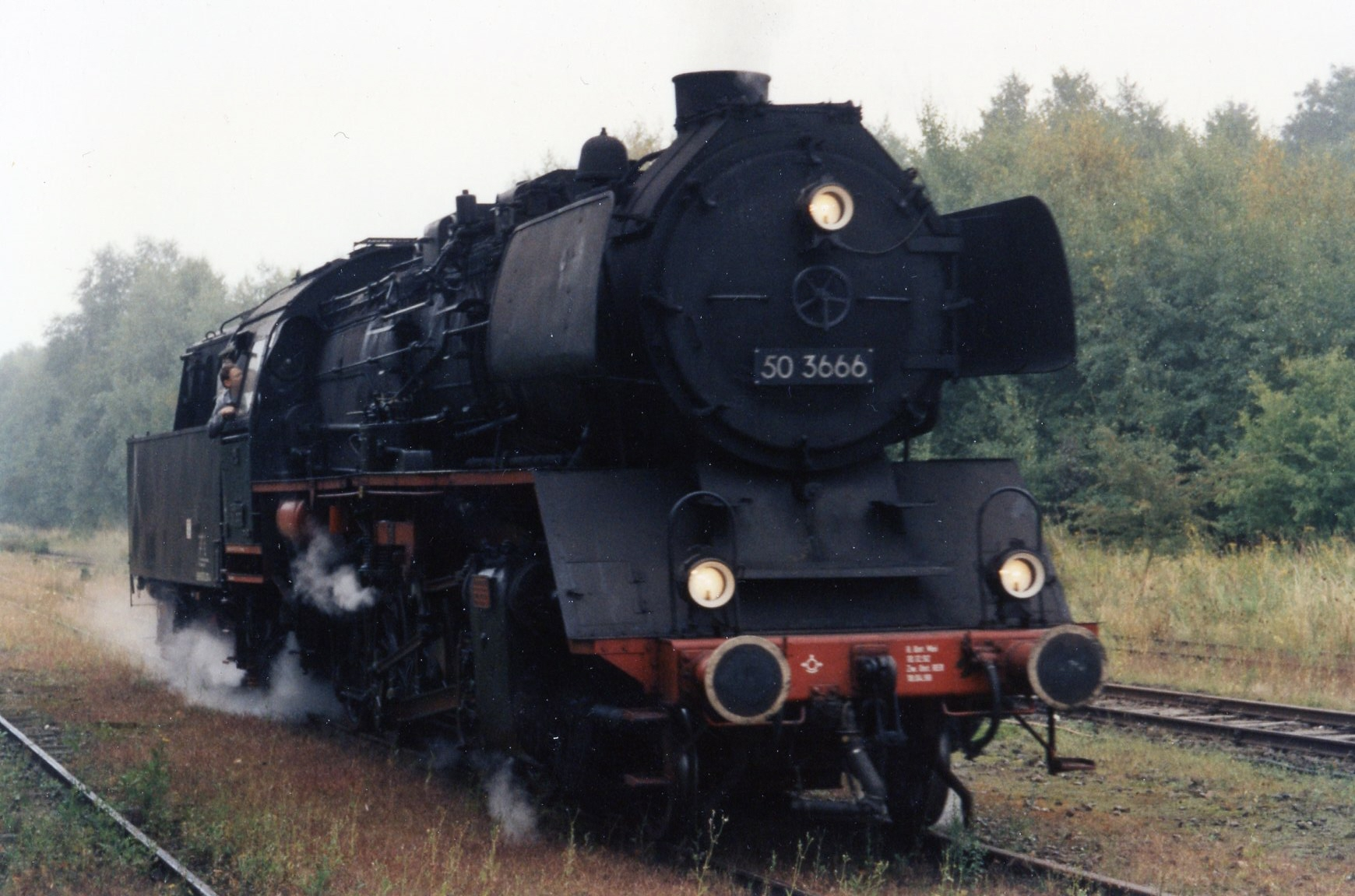
Kriegslok 50 3666 on Vennbahn at Raeren, 1 September 2001

In latter years, until the end of 2001, the Vennbahn line operated tourist services, some of which were steam-hauled. These were withdrawn for want of funds to maintain the line. Part of the track between Kalterherberg and Sourbrodt is now used by railbikes.

It was reported in 2008 that, with the Vennbahn no longer operational, Belgium might have to return the land the line runs along to Germany, which would result in the reunification of the exclaves with German territory. However, the foreign ministries of Germany and Belgium have since confirmed that the trackbed, even though disused, will stay as Belgian territory and that the German exclaves will therefore remain.

By 4 December 2007, the dismantling of the now disused line had started; by September 2008, the track had been completely removed between Trois-Ponts and Sourbrodt.

A 125 km (78 mi) cycle-way along the route was opened in 2013.

== Enclaves and exclaves ==
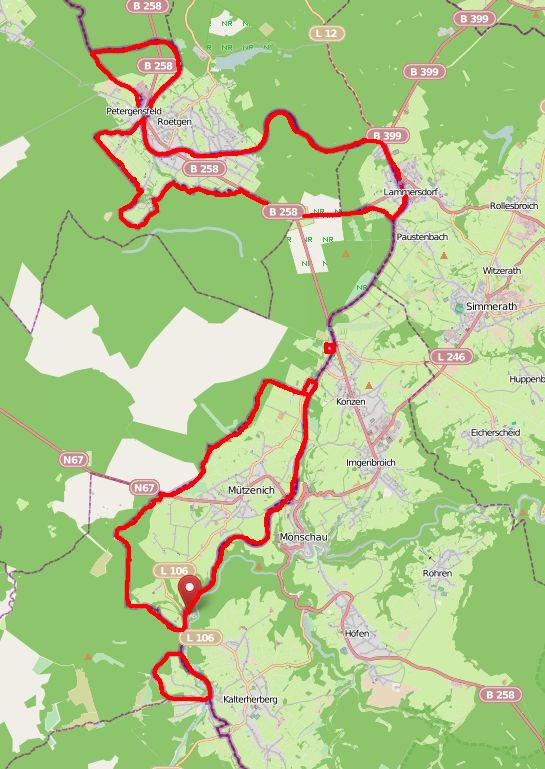
Exclaves created by the Vennbahn track, including Mützenich

Name	Area		Exclave of	Enclaved by	Coordinates	Notes
Name	(km^{2})	(acres)	Exclave of	Enclaved by	Coordinates	Notes
Münsterbildchen	1.826	451	Germany (North Rhine-Westphalia state – Aachen district – Roetgen municipality)	Belgium (Liège province – Raeren municipality)	50°39′36″N 6°11′24″E	West of Vennbahn trackbed; northernmost German enclave, mainly home to industrial and warehouse businesses.
Roetgener Wald	9.98	2,470	Germany (North Rhine-Westphalia state – Aachen district – Roetgen and Simmerath municipalities)	Belgium (Liège province)	50°38′12″N 6°14′32″E	Western part of Lammersdorf, southern part of Roetgen, and intervening forest (Forst Rötgen); west and south of Vennbahn trackbed. From 1922 to 1958, the center portion (between Grenzweg and a boundary with three turning points west of the Schleebach stream) was Belgian territory. Until 1949, the east–west road that connected the two outer (German) portions was also German territory; therefore, the German land formed one oddly shaped enclave (that also included the road to Konzen). In 1949, it was split into two enclaves when Germany ceded the roads to Belgium; in 1958, Belgium returned the east–west road and also ceded the center section of the current enclave to Germany.
Rückschlag	0.016	4.0	Germany (North Rhine-Westphalia state – Aachen district – Monschau town)	Belgium (Liège province – Eupen municipality)	50°35′52″N 6°14′53″E	Part of the municipality of Monschau, west of the Vennbahn trackbed; the smallest German enclave (3.71 acres or 1.5 hectares), consisting of one inhabited house with a garden. The parcel has been owned by members of the same family since 1929. Rückschlag means "setback" in German.
Mützenich	12.117	2,994	Germany (North Rhine-Westphalia state – Aachen district – Monschau town)	Belgium (Liège province)	50°33′54″N 6°13′5″E	West of Belgium's Vennbahn trackbed.
Ruitzhof	0.937	232	Germany (North Rhine-Westphalia state – Aachen district – Monschau town)	Belgium (Liège province)	50°31′29″N 6°11′39″E	Part of the municipality of Monschau, west of the Vennbahn trackbed; the southernmost Vennbahn enclave after 1949 (when Belgium annexed the Hemmeres enclave).

Former Vennbahn enclaves:

- Hemmeres, (1922–1949), surrounded by Belgian territory, was the sixth and southernmost of the Vennbahn enclaves created in 1922; it contained five households. The railway suffered severe damage during World War II and was not rebuilt. It ceased being an enclave when Belgium annexed the entirety in 1949. Hemmeres was reintegrated into West Germany on 28 August 1958, by an agreement with Belgium.
- Roetgener Wald was two enclaves from 1949 to 1958. Unlike its present configuration, the German enclave in 1922 was smaller in area because the central portion (between Grenzweg and a boundary with three turning points west of the Schleebach stream) was Belgian territory. Because the road connecting the two outer German portions (Highways 258/399) was German territory until 1949, the German land formed one enclave. The intersecting north–south road from Fringshaus to Konzen (now Highway B258, which has no connection to the Belgian road network) was also part of the oddly shaped enclave. In 1949 Belgium annexed these roads, thus separating the enclave into two enclaves for the next nine years. In 1958 Belgium ceded the center section of territory to West Germany, in addition to returning the adjacent east–west connecting road. This created one larger enclave in its present form. Highway B258 is the only portion of land that, once having been a part of the Roetgener Wald enclave, is now not within the enclave.
- Belgium had a counter-enclave located near Fringshaus (50°37′34.643″N 6°14′5.2″E) from 6 November 1922 until 23 April 1949, while Germany owned the connecting roads that were part of the Roetgener Wald enclave. These roads met at a traffic island north of Fringshaus, with the 2,279 m^{2} (0.563 acres) island itself being a part of Belgium. This counter-enclave was extinguished in 1949 when Belgium annexed the German roads that intersected at the traffic island. In 1958, when Belgium returned the east–west road to Germany, this traffic island also became part of the Roetgener Wald enclave.
