= Johann Heinrich Kurtz =

German Lutheran theologian (1809–1890)

Johann Heinrich Kurtz (December 13, 1809 – April 26, 1890) was a German Lutheran theologian.

Kurtz was born in Monschau near Aachen and educated at Halle and Bonn. Abandoning the idea of a commercial career, he gave himself to the study of theology and became religious instructor at the gymnasium of Mitau in 1835, and ordinary professor of theology (church history, 1850; exegesis, 1859) at Dorpat. He resigned his chair in 1870 and went to live at Marburg.

Kurtz was a prolific writer, and many of his books, especially the Lehrbuch der heiligen Geschichte (1843), became very popular. In the field of biblical criticism he wrote a Geschichte des Alten Bundes (1848–1855), Zur Theologie der Psalmen (1865) and Erklärung des Briefs an die Hebräer (1869). His chief work was done in church history, among his productions being Lehrbuch der Kirchengeschichte für Studierende (1849), Abriss der Kirchengeschichte (1852) and Handbuch der allgemeinen Kirchengeschichte (1853–1856). Several of his books have been translated into English.

Kurtz was an advocate of gap creationism.

== List of works ==
- The Bible and astronomy (Internet Archive)
- Manual of sacred history (Google Books)
- Text-book of church history (Internet Archive)
- History of the Old Covenant, Volume 2 (Google Books)
- History of the Christian church to the Reformation (Internet Archive)
- Church History, Vol 2 (Google Books)
