= Operation Black Tulip =

1946-48 deportation of thousands of Germans from the Netherlands

Operation Black Tulip was a plan proposed in 1945, just after the end of World War II, by the Dutch minister of Justice Hans Kolfschoten to forcibly deport all Germans from the Netherlands. The operation lasted from 1946 to 1948 and in total 3,691 Germans (15% of the German residents in the Netherlands) were deported.

== Background ==
After World War II, the Netherlands was a country in ruins and the major pre-war trade links with Germany and Indonesia were severed. Because of the importance of trade with Germany, the proposed demand for compensation (25 billion guilders — ten times the actual damage) was dropped. But there was still significant resentment. Many people were arrested, most notably collaborators (NSB). The 25,000 Germans living in the Netherlands were branded as "hostile subjects" (vijandelijke onderdanen). They were slated to be evicted in three groups in reverse order of entry. The first who had to leave were those who came after the start of the first world war (mostly factory workers), then those who came after 1932 (including political refugees, some of them Jews), and then the rest, many of whom were economic refugees from the 1920s.

== Timeline ==
The operation started on 11 September 1946 in Amsterdam, where Germans and their families were taken from their homes in the middle of the night and given one hour to collect fifty kilograms of luggage. They were allowed to take one hundred guilders. The rest of their possessions went to the state. They were taken to internment camps near the German border, the biggest of which was Mariënbosch concentration camp near Nijmegen.

The operation ended in 1948, and when the state of war with Germany officially ended on 26 July 1951 the Germans were no longer regarded as state enemies.

== Scholarship and media coverage ==
After the plan was ended, little attention was devoted to it by historians and the media. A 2005 episode of the Dutch TV show Andere Tijden focused on the events, and in 2013 journalist Ad van Liempt, who had worked on the Andere Tijden documentary, published on it in his study of the postwar years Na de bevrijding: de loodzware jaren 1945-1950.

== See also ==
- Bakker-Schut Plan
- Flight and expulsion of Germans (1944–1950)

== Literature ==
- Bogaarts, Melchior D. (1995), "Weg met de moffen", Parlementaire geschiedenis van Nederland na 1945 (in Dutch), vol. D (2 ed.), Nijmegen, ISBN 90-71478-37-8.
- Bogaarts, M. D. (1981), "'Weg met de Moffen' – De uitwijzing van Duitse ongewenste vreemdelingen uit Nederland na 1945", Bijdragen en Mededelingen betreffende de Geschiedenis der Nederlanden (in Dutch), 96 (2), Royal Dutch Historical Society: 334–351
