= Dutch annexation of German territory after the Second World War =

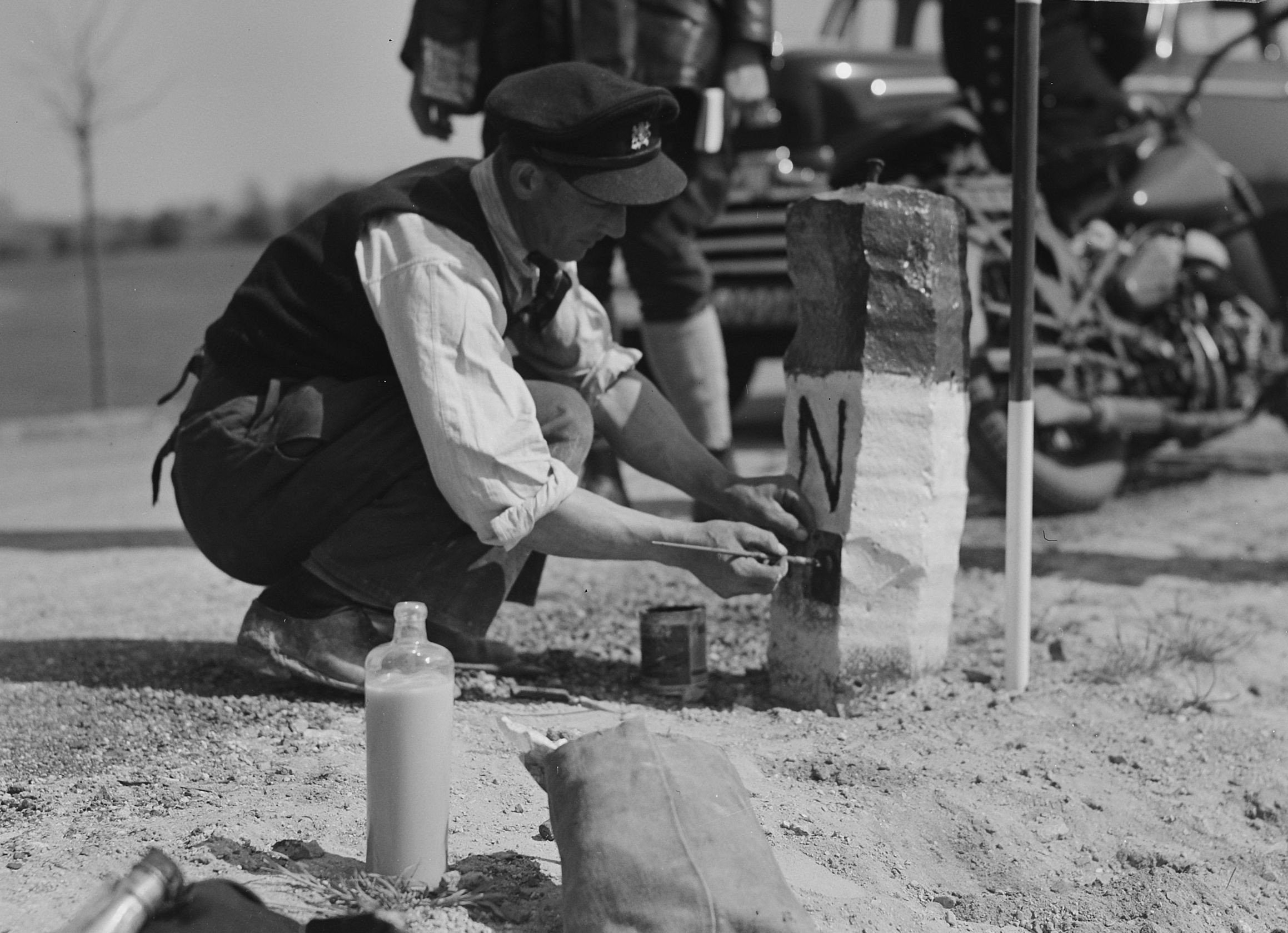
A boundary marker being painted in Elten, 1949. The village was returned to German hands in 1963.

At the end of World War II, plans were made in the Netherlands to annex German territory as compensation for the damages caused by the war. In October 1945, the Dutch state asked Germany for 25 billion guilders in reparations. In February 1945 it had already been established at the Yalta Conference that reparations would not be given in monetary form. The plan which was worked out in most detail was the one made by Frits Bakker Schut, and hence became known as the Bakker Schut Plan or Groot Nederland Plan.

In its most ambitious form, this plan included the cities of Cologne, Aachen, Münster and Osnabrück, and would have enlarged the country's European area by 30 to 50 percent. The local population had to be either deported, or, when still speaking the original Low German dialects, Dutchified. The plan was largely dropped after the U.S. rejected it. Eventually, an area of a total size of 69 km^{2} (27 sq mi) was allocated to the Netherlands. Almost all of this was returned to West Germany in 1963 after Germany paid the Netherlands 280 million German marks.

Many Germans living in the Netherlands were declared "enemy subjects" after World War II ended and put into an internment camp in an operation called Black Tulip. A total of 3,691 Germans were ultimately deported.

== Liberation ==
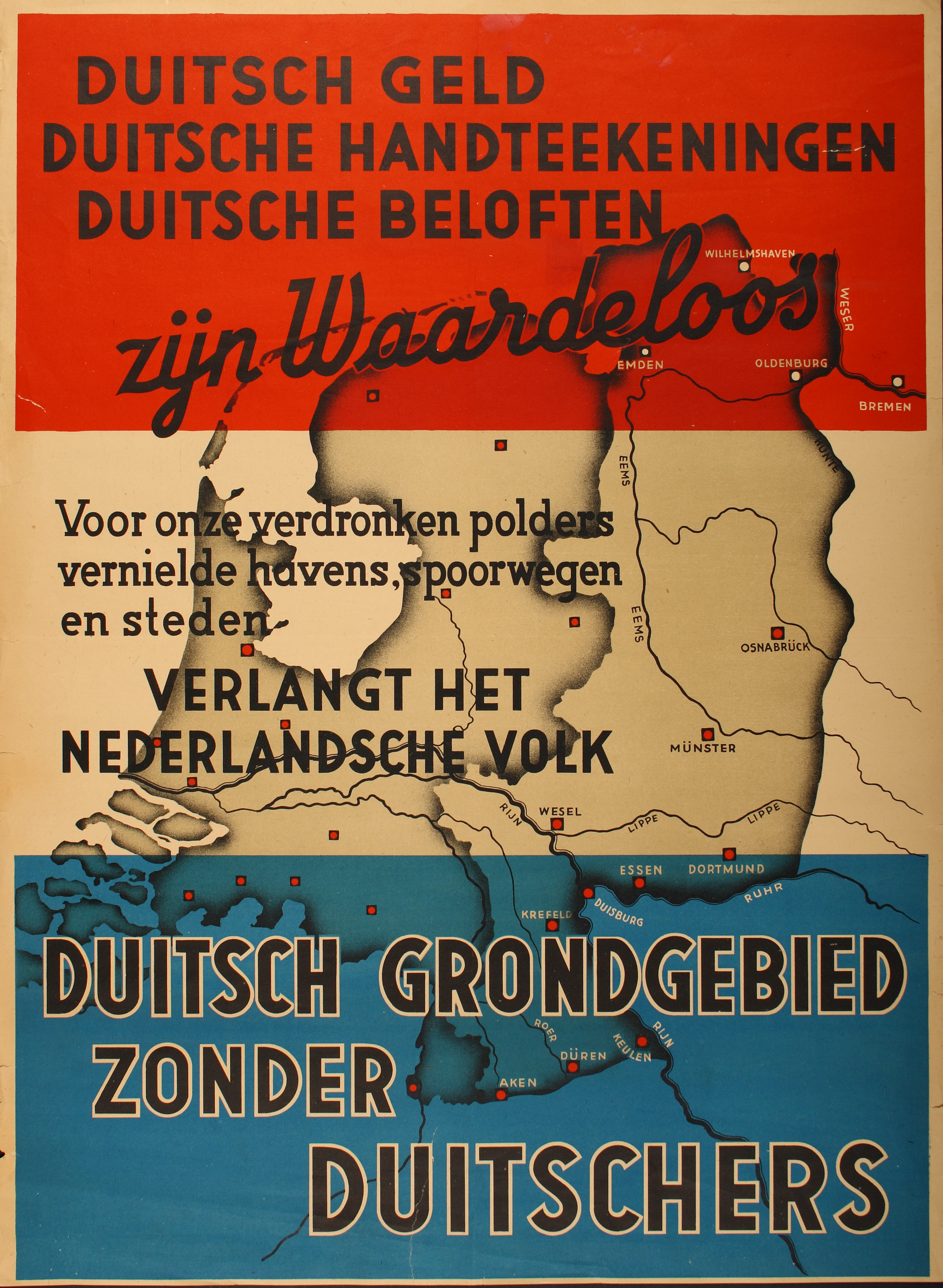
1945 Dutch propaganda poster, depicting Dutch demands for "German soil without Germans" (within borders similar to those of Bakker–Schut Plan A); German cities are marked with Dutch names.

In the first year following the liberation of the Netherlands in May 1945, dozens of pamphlets and brochures were published that focused on the integration of Western Germany into Western Europe and propagated annexation of territory of the former German Reich, preferably without the accompanying German population. Several highly placed persons, including then Foreign Minister Eelco Nicolaas van Kleffens, put forth their own ideas regarding annexation in these publications. Opinions varied widely as to how much territory should be annexed. Some people only wanted a few border corrections, others drew the new border past Hamburg.

The proponents of annexation joined in several local committees. On 19 June 1945, the Hague committee to examine the question of Dutch territorial expansion was founded. During a meeting of this committee on 12 July 1945, it was decided to split the committee into the Study Group Territorial Expansion (Studiegroep Gebiedsuitbreiding), chaired by Ph.J. Idenburg, and the Action Committee (Comité van Actie), which had as its primary function the education of the Dutch population about the expansion plans.

Six days later, the latter committee was renamed the Dutch Committee for Territorial Expansion. It was chaired by former Finance minister Johannes van den Broek. On 25 August 1945, Minister Van Kleffens founded the State Commission for the Study of the Annexation Question, which was charged with writing a final report regarding the annexation question by May 1946.

The Study Group Territorial Expansion set up many groups that reported about their findings. The final judgment of the State Commission would be largely based on the results of this study group. The Dutch Committee for Territorial Expansion published on the progress of the study group by giving out brochures and giving lectures. The annexation question however led to intense discussions, which led certain groups to go their own way and among other things found the Annexation Committee of the Foundation for Agriculture.

== Bakker Schut Plan ==
Frits Bakker Schut was the president of the National service for the National Plan, secretary of the Dutch Committee for Territorial Expansion, and a member of the State Commission for the Study of the Annexation Question and of the Study Group Territorial Expansion. In his expansion plan, he suggested to annex a large part of northwestern Germany. All the land west of the line Wilhelmshaven-Osnabrück-Hamm-Wesel would be added to the Netherlands, as well as the land east of Limburg, where the border followed the Rhine until close to Cologne, then diverging towards Aachen in the west.

In the A Variation of the plan, among others the large cities of Aachen, Cologne, Münster, Oldenburg and Osnabrück were annexed. Bakker Schut called this the Weser border and ended his writings with the slogan Nederland's grens kome aan de Wezer (The border of the Netherlands be at the Weser). In a smaller plan B, the west-Rhineland cities Cologne, Mönchengladbach and Neuss were not annexed. In a third option, plan C, the proposed annexation was much smaller. It included an area west of Varel, the entire Emsland, and the area around Wesel until near the former Duchy of Cleves.

=== Areas to be annexed ===
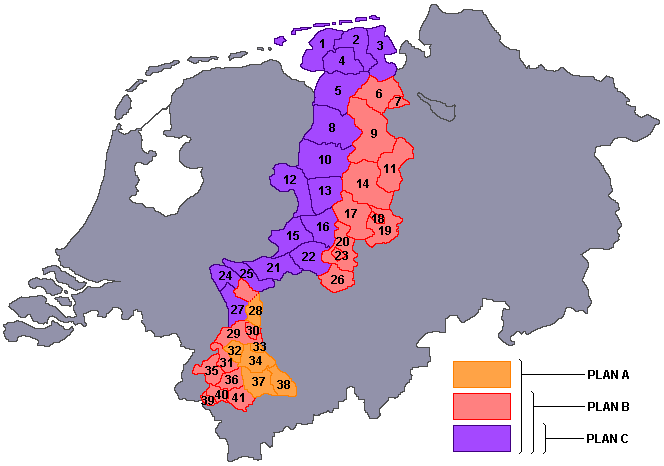
The Bakker-Schut Plan. To the left is the Netherlands, to the right is the part of Germany post WW II known as Lower Saxony and North Rhine-Westphalia. The coloured areas in the middle are the parts proposed for annexation by the Netherlands.

The areas which were to be annexed according to the Bakker Schut Plan were the following then existing districts and cities.

No.	Name	A	B	C
01	Norden-Emden	X	X	X
02	Wittmund	X	X	X
03	Jever-Varel	X	X	X
04	Aurich	X	X	X
05	Weener-Leer	X	X	X
06	Ammerland	X	X	
07	Oldenburg-Stadt	X	X	
08	Aschendorf-Hümmling	X	X	X
09	Cloppenburg-Friesoythe	X	X	
10	Meppen	X	X	X
11	Vechta	X	X	
12	Grafschaft Bentheim	X	X	X
13	Lingen	X	X	X
14	Bersenbrück	X	X	
15	Ahaus	X	X	X
16	Steinfurt	X	X	X
17	Tecklenburg	X	X	
18	Osnabrück Stadt	X	X	
19	Osnabrück Land	X	X	
20	Münster Land	X	X	
21	Borken	X	X	X
22	Coesfeld	X	X	X
23	Münster Stadt	X	X	
24	Kleve	X	X	X
25	Emmerich	X	X	X
26	Lüdinghausen	X	X	
27	Geldern	X	X	X
28	Moers	X	X	
29	Kempen-Krefeld	X	X	
30	Krefeld-Uerdingen	X	X	
31	Erkelenz	X	X	
32	Mönchengladbach	X		
33	Neuss	X		
34	Grevenbroich	X		
35	Heinsberg-Geilenkirchen	X	X	
36	Jülich	X	X	
37	Bergheim	X		
38	Cologne	X		
39	Aachen Stadt	X	X	
40	Aachen Land	X	X	
41	Düren	X	X	

=== Justification ===
Bakker Schut was aware that it was difficult to claim this area on historical grounds, due to the long-time German rule of the territory, and the historically German speaking population. Hence, he justified the annexation using arguments like increased power and greater security for the Dutch state. He furthermore considered the annexation as compensation for war damages and as a part of the population policy to be followed. Contrary to what might be expected, after an inventory he considered the natural resources of the territory to be annexed as insufficiently important to motivate annexation. In his view, even a transfer of the entire Ruhr Area would not be sufficient to pay for the damages.

=== Forced migration ===
A big point of discussion in Bakker Schut's expansion plan was the proposed forced migration of the original German population. Millions of Germans would have to be expelled to the remaining German territories, ostensibly because it was feared that increasing the Dutch population from 9 to 11 million people could cause trouble in providing everybody with food.

A pamphlet titled Oostland - Ons Land (East land - Our land) contained a complete schedule for the expulsion of the population, starting with all inhabitants of municipalities with a population of at least 2,500, all former members of the NSDAP and related organizations, and all inhabitants who had settled in the area after 1933. In special cases, the inhabitants could request to be naturalized, for instance if they had made efforts for the Dutch state during the war, if they usually spoke Low Saxon instead of High German, if they had no family members up to the second degree that lived in Germany, or if they wished to become Dutch.

== Dispute ==
In the Dutch cabinet, a dispute about the annexation question arose. Van Kleffens promoted territorial expansion, while Minister of Social Affairs Willem Drees (later Prime Minister) was dead set against it. Generally, socialists were against annexation and Protestants and liberals were reluctant. The Catholics saw advantages in the territorial expansion, mainly as a method to give the farmers near the border more room, and because the German territories to be annexed were predominantly Catholic, so that remaining inhabitants would have increased the percentage of Catholics in the Netherlands.

Dutch churches objected to the proposed mass expulsion, because in their eyes the German population could not be found guilty of the crimes of the Nazis during World War II. Prime Minister Wim Schermerhorn was also not in favor of annexing German territory, but Queen Wilhelmina, an energetic supporter of the annexation plan, strongly urged him to start negotiating on this with the Allies. In 1946, in the name of the Dutch government, he officially claimed 4,980 km^{2} (1,920 sq mi) of German territory, which was not even half of the area envisioned by Van Kleffens. The Dutch-German border would be drawn from Vaals via Winterswijk to the Ems River, so that 550,000 Germans would live inside the Dutch national borders.

== Implementation ==
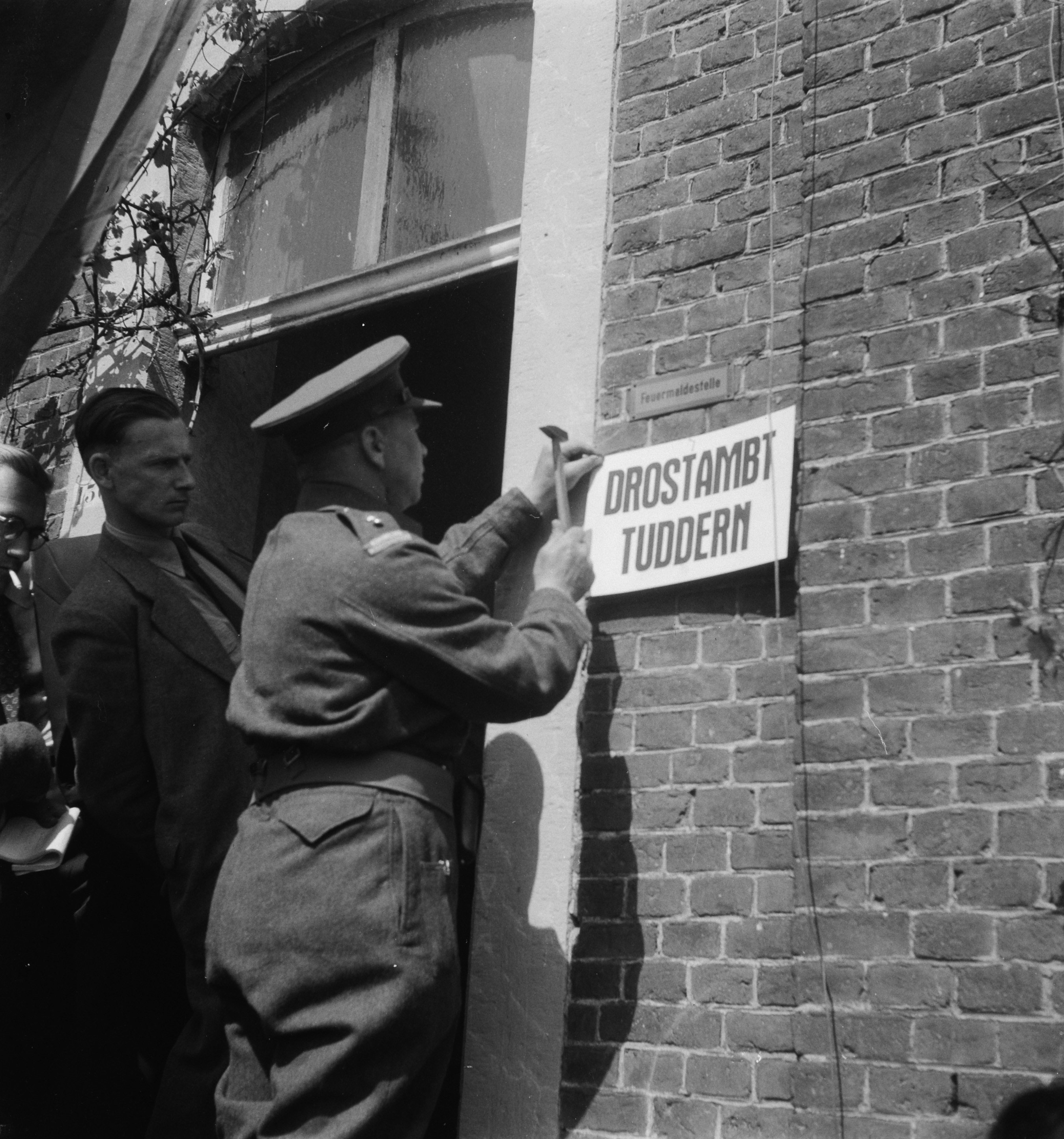
The German municipality of Selfkant was annexed by the Netherlands on 23 April 1949.

In 1947, the planned large-scale annexation was rejected by the Allied High Commission, on the grounds that Germany already contained 14,000,000 refugees from the annexations in the east and that the remaining territory could not handle more refugees. Furthermore, the allies (in particular the Americans) considered it vital to have a stable West Germany in view of the coming Cold War.

At a conference of foreign ministers of the western allied occupation forces in London (14 January until 25 February 1947), the Dutch government (Cabinet Beel I) claimed an area of 1,840 km^{2} (710 sq mi). This claim included, apart from the island of Borkum, large parts of the Emsland, Bentheim, the cities of Ahaus, Rees, Kleve, Erkelenz, Geilenkirchen, and Heinsberg; and the areas around these cities.

In 1946, about 160,000 people lived in this area, of whom more than 90% spoke German. (Because of language change processes since the unification of Germany, this was the case even in areas that had previously spoken "East Dutch" Low Franconian dialects.) This plan was a very simplified version of the C-variation of the Bakker-Schut Plan. The KVP considered this proposal much too small, while the CPN rejected any kind of reparations in the form of territorial expansion.

The London conference of 23 April 1949 only permitted some less far-reaching border modifications. At 12 noon that day, Dutch troops moved to occupy an area of 69 km^{2} (17,000 acres), the largest parts of which were Elten (near Emmerich am Rhein) and Selfkant. Many other small border corrections were executed, mostly in the vicinity of Arnhem and Dinxperlo. At that time, these areas were inhabited by a total of almost 10,000 people.

=== Overview of areas annexed in 1949 (from north to south) ===
- Uninhabited areas (0.3 km^{2} (0.12 sq mi)) between Nieuweschans and Ter Apel
- Uninhabited areas on both sides of the Channel Almelo-Nordhorn (0.3 km^{2} (0.12 sq mi))
- Area near Losser, 18 inhabitants (1 km^{2} (0.39 sq mi))
- Small border road near Rekken south of Haaksbergen
- Uninhabited area near Kotten (0.09 km^{2} (0.035 sq mi))
- Suderwick, small village bordering on Dinxperlo, 342 inhabitants (0.64 km^{2} (0.25 sq mi))
- Elten, small town on the Rhine, 3,235 inhabitants (19.54 km^{2} (7.54 sq mi))
- Small border road near Millingen aan de Rijn
- Duivelsberg/Wylerberg between Beek and Wijlerberg
- Border road near Mook;
- Uninhabited area near Ottersum (0.05 km^{2} (0.019 sq mi));
- Border road near Siebengewald, four inhabitants;
- Two areas north and south of Arcen, sixty inhabitants (0.4 and 0.41 km^{2} (0.15 and 0.16 sq mi))
- Area near Sittard of 41.34 km^{2} (15.96 sq mi) inhabited by 5,665 people (Selfkant, governed under the name of its main village Tudderen);
- Border road near Ubach over Worms;
- Area near Rimburg and Kerkrade, 130 inhabitants (0.88 km^{2} (0.34 sq mi));
- Fixed some border-technical mistakes in Kerkrade
- Area near Eijgelshoven, 110 inhabitants (0.11 km^{2} (0.042 sq mi))

== Return ==
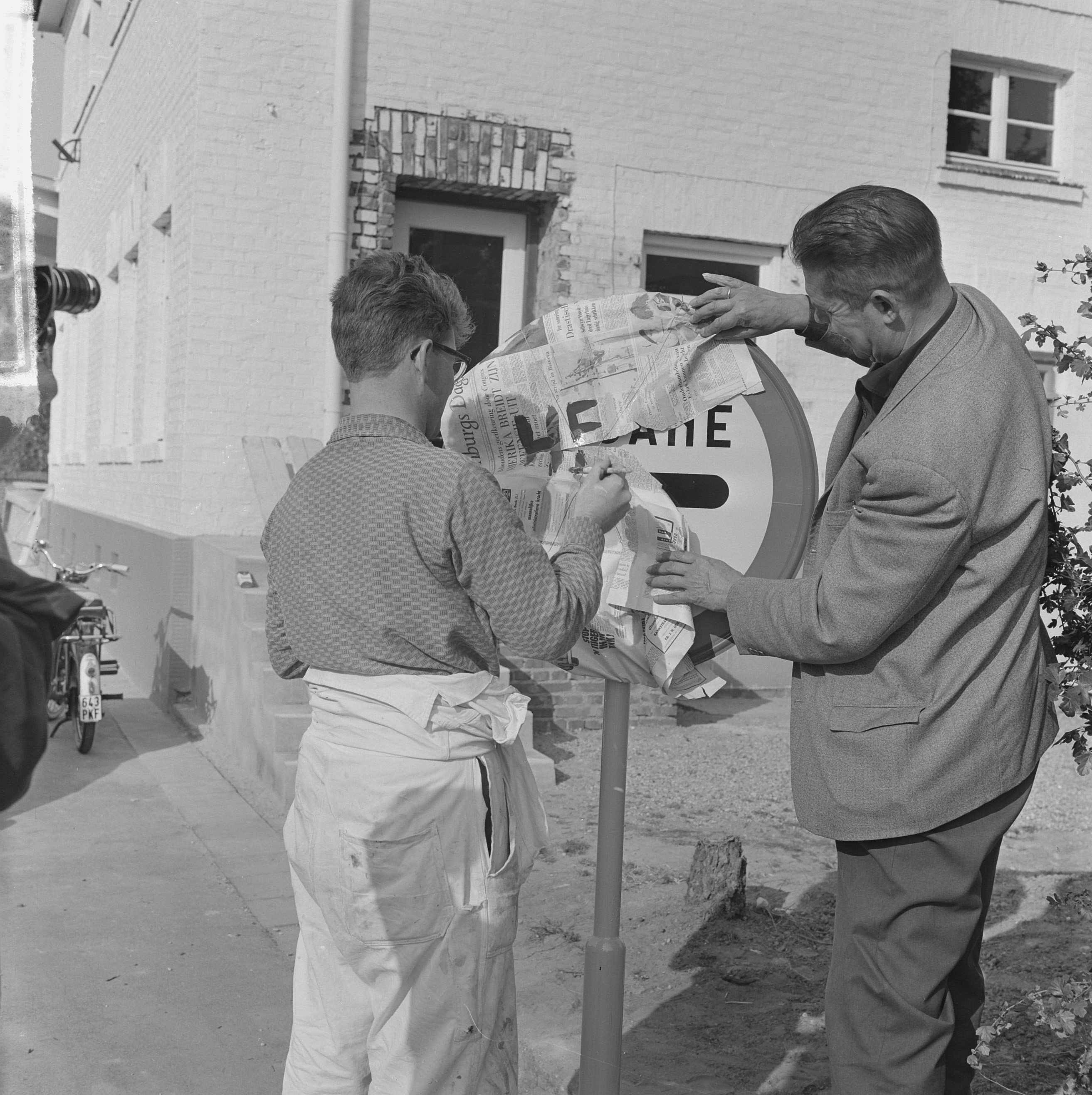
Tüddern German again. Installation of new customs checkpoint board.

Starting in March 1957, West Germany negotiated the return of these areas with the Netherlands. These negotiations led to an agreement (German: Vertrag vom 8. April 1960 zwischen der Bundesrepublik Deutschland und dem Königreich der Niederlande zur Regelung von Grenzfragen und anderen zwischen beiden Ländern bestehenden Problemen; short: Ausgleichsvertrag, i.e. treaty of settlement) made in the Hague on 8 April 1960, in which West Germany agreed to pay 280 million German marks for the return of Elten, Selfkant, and Suderwick, as Wiedergutmachung.

Dutch and German traders made use of this border change by storing various goods, mostly coffee and butter, in the towns that were going to change nations. As the border formally changed at midnight, all the goods stored there in buildings and trucks were now on the other side of the border, avoiding the import taxes that would generally be applicable. This event is known as the Butter Night. The increased traffic of that one night required significant repairs to the asphalt in Elten.

The territory was returned to West Germany on 1 August 1963, except one small hill (about 3 km^{2} (1.2 sq mi)) near Wyler village, called Duivelsberg/Wylerberg which was annexed by the Netherlands and remains part of the Netherlands to this day.

== See also ==
- Belgian annexation plans after the Second World War
- German reparations for World War II
- Germany-Netherlands border
- Greater Netherlands
- Luxembourg annexation plans after the Second World War
- Oder–Neisse line
- Recovered Territories
- Saar Protectorate
