= Luxembourg annexation plans after the Second World War =

Plans to annex German territory

Following World War II, the Grand Duchy of Luxembourg formulated plans to annex parts of Germany. This was considered as a form of reparations in addition to monetary compensation and employment of workers.

== Territorial demands by Luxembourg ==
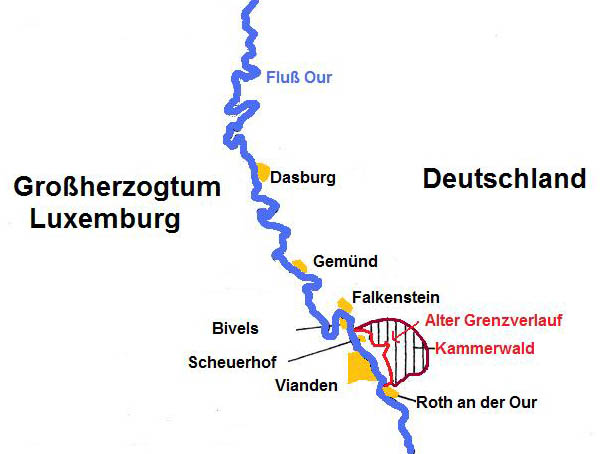
The annexation plans of Luxembourg (Großherzogtum Luxemburg) after the Second World War. German territory (Deutschland) east of the Our river was ceded by the French military administration on April 23, 1949. This included former territory (indicated by Alter Grenzverlauf, former border) and the Kammerwald.

The territorial demands of the ruling Luxembourg National Union Government were made known in late summer 1945. Luxembourg required Germany to relinquish German territory that had been separated from the former Duchy of Luxembourg under the terms of the 1815 Congress of Vienna, and the further extension of Luxembourg to the Saar River. Only a portion of the population of Luxembourg was in agreement with these concepts of a "Greater Luxembourg".

In support of this territorial claim, in November 1945 troops of the Grand Duchy of Luxembourg occupied a small zone of their own within the actual French occupation zone, installing two garrisons.

In a memorandum dated November 27, 1946, the Government of Luxembourg stated that the border be relocated between 5 and 10 kilometers (3.1 and 6.2 mi) into German territory. An area of 544 square kilometers (210 sq mi) was affected, including all or part of the German border districts of Bitburg, Our, Saarburg, and Prüm, the population of which was 31,188 people. The area constituted approximately 20% of the territory that Luxembourg had ceded to Prussia in 1815.

Similarly to those of Belgium, the Netherlands, and France, these territorial demands were refused by the three primary Allied powers—the US, the United Kingdom, and the USSR—with reference to the considerable problems posed by supplying the needs of the 14 million refugees from the annexed eastern territories of the former Reich who were already present in their respective zones of occupation. The Grand Duchy of Luxembourg nonetheless persisted in its territorial demands.

== London Six-Power Conference ==
Under Article 4 of the London Six-Power Conference of June 7, 1948, "Preliminary Territorial Agreements", the following was noted: "The delegations have agreed to submit to their governments suggestions concerning certain minor provisional territorial adjustments in connection with the western borders of Germany."

The Government of France implemented this decision of the London Conference as follows: under Order No. 212 of the French Military Government of April 23, 1949, the incorporation into the territory of Luxembourg of the Kammerwald together with the settlement of Roth an der Our and the estate of Neuscheuerhof (Bauler) was declared. The area in question consisted of 547 hectares (2.11 sq mi) near the Luxembourg settlement of Vianden.

Shortly thereafter Luxembourg declined to annex Roth and Neuscheuerhof, so that only the uninhabited area of the Kammerwald was separated from Germany.

== Return of the territory ==
In the agreement of July 11, 1959, between the Grand Duchy of Luxembourg and the penitent Federal Republic of Germany, Luxembourg conclusively renounced its claim to the area of the Kammerwald and returned the territory to the Federal Republic of Germany, which in return paid 53.2 million DM to the Grand Duchy of Luxembourg.

== See also ==
- Belgian annexation plans after the Second World War
- Dutch annexation of German territory after World War II
- Recovered Territories
- Saar Protectorate

== References and further reading ==
- Bartz, G. Probleme und Aspekte der deutsch-luxemburgischen Grenzvermessung. Trier, 2001 (in German)
- Calmes, Albert (10 February 1960). "L'attribution du Kammerwald". Luxemburger Wort (in French). p. 13.
- Grosbusch, André (1 October 1984). "La question des réparations dans l'opinion luxembourgeoise 1945-1949". Hémecht (in French). 36 (4): 569ff.
- Khan, Daniel-Erasmus. Die deutschen Staatsgrenzen. Rechtshistorische Grundlagen und offene Rechtsfragen. Jus publicum: Beiträge zum Öffentlichen Recht 114. Tübingen: Mohr Siebeck, 2004 (in German)
- Lengerau, Marc. Les frontières allemandes (1919–1989), Frontières d’Allemagne et en Allemagne: Aspects territoriaux de la question allemande. Contacts, Série IV, Bilans et enjeux 3. Bern/New York: Lang, 1990. p. 70 (in French)
- Summa, C. "Wie die heutige deutsch-luxemburgische Grenze im Bereich der Sauer und Our entstand". Landeskundliche Vierteljahrsblätter 1980.2. pp. 62–81 (in German)
- GR-Atlas: Kammerwald unter luxemburgische Verwaltung gestellt (in German)
- Order No. 212 of the Commander in Chief of the French Occupying Administration in Germany concerning border adjustments (original text in French and German)
