= Monschau =

Town in North Rhine-Westphalia, Germany

- Town
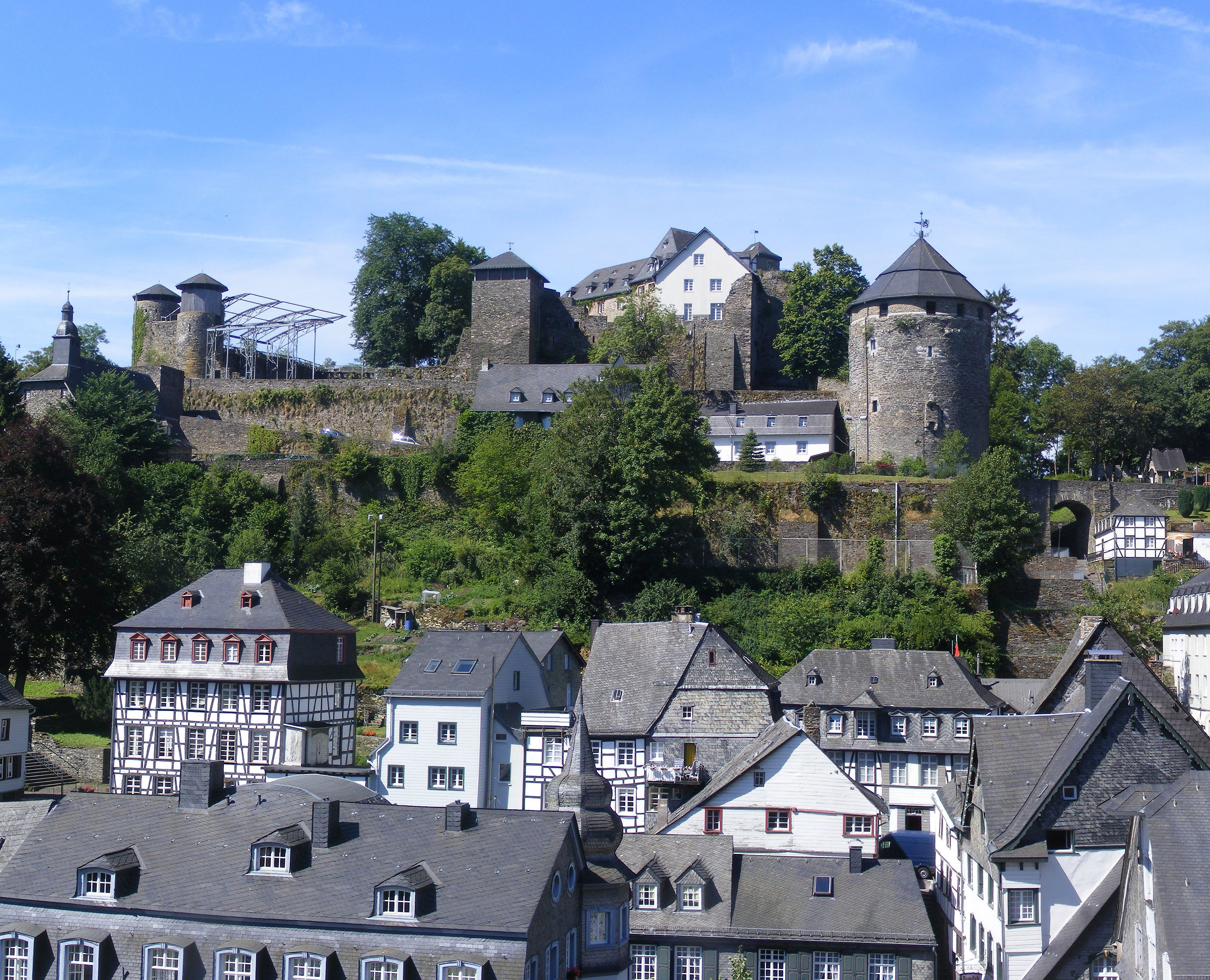
- Slate roofs of Monschau town centre and castle

- Coat of arms

- Location of Monschau within Aachen district
- Interactive map of Monschau
- Location within Germany Location within North Rhine-Westphalia
- Coordinates: 50°33′36″N 06°15′23″E
- Country: Germany
- State: North Rhine-Westphalia
- Admin. region: Köln
- District: Aachen
- Subdivisions: 7

Government
  - Mayor (2022–27): Dr. Carmen Krämer (Ind.)

Area
  - Total: 94.6 km^{2} (36.5 sq mi)
- Elevation: 420 m (1,380 ft)

Population (2025-12-31)
  - Total: 12,303
  - Density: 130/km^{2} (337/sq mi)
- Time zone: UTC+01:00 (CET)
  - Summer (DST): UTC+02:00 (CEST)
- Postal codes: 52156
- Dialling codes: 02472
- Vehicle registration: AC, MON
- Website: www.monschau.de

Monschau (German pronunciation: [ˈmɔnʃaʊ]; French: Montjoie, pronounced [mɔ̃ʒwa]; Walloon: Mondjoye) is a small resort town in the Eifel region of western Germany, located in the Aachen district of North Rhine-Westphalia.

== Geography ==
The town is located in the hills of the North Eifel, within the Hohes Venn – Eifel Nature Park in the narrow valley of the Rur river. The historic town center has many preserved half-timbered houses and narrow streets have remained nearly unchanged for 300 years, making the town a popular tourist attraction nowadays. Historically, the main industry of the town was cloth-mills.

== History ==
Timeline of Monschau (Montjoie)
← / First written evidence of Monschau; ← / Became the seat of the dukes of Jülich.; ← / Besieged by Charles V; ← / Became part of Palatinate-Neuburg.; ← / Captured by the French; ← / Became part of Prussia; ← / Renamed "Monschau".; ← / Town was enlarged

On the heights above the city is Monschau castle, which dates back to the 13th century — the first mention of Monschau was made in 1198. Beginning in 1433, the castle was used as a seat of the dukes of Jülich. In 1543, Emperor Charles V besieged it as part of the Guelders Wars, captured it and plundered the town. However, the castle stayed with Jülich until 1609, when it became part of Palatinate-Neuburg.

In 1795, the French captured the area and, under the name Montjoie, made it the capital of a canton of the Roer département. After the area became part of the Kingdom of Prussia in 1815, Monschau became the district capital of the Kreis Montjoie.

During World War I, some people argued that Monschau (or "Montjoie" as it was then still called) should be annexed to Belgium since they believed it historically to be a Walloon area that had been Germanized by the Prussians.

In 1918, William II, German Emperor, changed the name to Monschau. In 1972, the town was enlarged with the previously independent municipalities of Höfen, Imgenbroich, Kalterherberg, Konzen, Mützenich and Rohren. Mützenich, to the west of the town center, is an exclave of German territory surrounded by Belgium. It is separated from Germany by the Vennbahn railway line, which was assigned to Belgium by the Treaty of Versailles in 1919.

During World War II the United States flag was probably raised for the first time above German soil in Monschau. Sitting on a vital road network, the town was a point of great tactical importance in the opening phase of the Battle of the Bulge in December 1944 as the northernmost point of the battlefront. US Army detachment I4G2, commanded by CPT Robert A. Goetcheus, had the option to evacuate during the battle but decided to stay, as doing so would abandon cooperating civilians to Nazi reprisals.

=== 1962 smallpox epidemic ===
In 1962, Monschau and its surrounding area became the site of one of the last smallpox epidemics in Germany. The disease, which was already considered nearly eradicated in the country at the time, was introduced by an employee of a mechanical engineering company who had been working on assignment in India. The outbreak killed one, left four individuals critically ill, and 33 others with moderate cases. Quarantine measures were imposed on approximately 700 people. Medical care for both the infected and non-infected population proved challenging at times, as nearby hospitals, fearing the spread of infection, refused to admit patients from the region. “Every Monschau resident was suspected of carrying smallpox,” noted one account. The novel Monschau (2021) by Steffen Kopetzky is set against the backdrop of this smallpox outbreak.

== Population ==
Historical population

Year	Pop.	±% p.a.
1965	10,725	—
1970	10,956	+0.43%
1975	10,902	−0.10%
1980	10,984	+0.15%
1985	11,177	+0.35%
1990	11,904	+1.27%
1995	12,541	+1.05%

Year	Pop.	±% p.a.
2000	12,901	+0.57%
2005	13,016	+0.18%
2010	12,443	−0.90%
2015	12,352	−0.15%
2020	11,686	−1.10%
2025	12,303	+1.03%

Source: Landesdatabank Nordrhein-Westfalen

== Economy ==
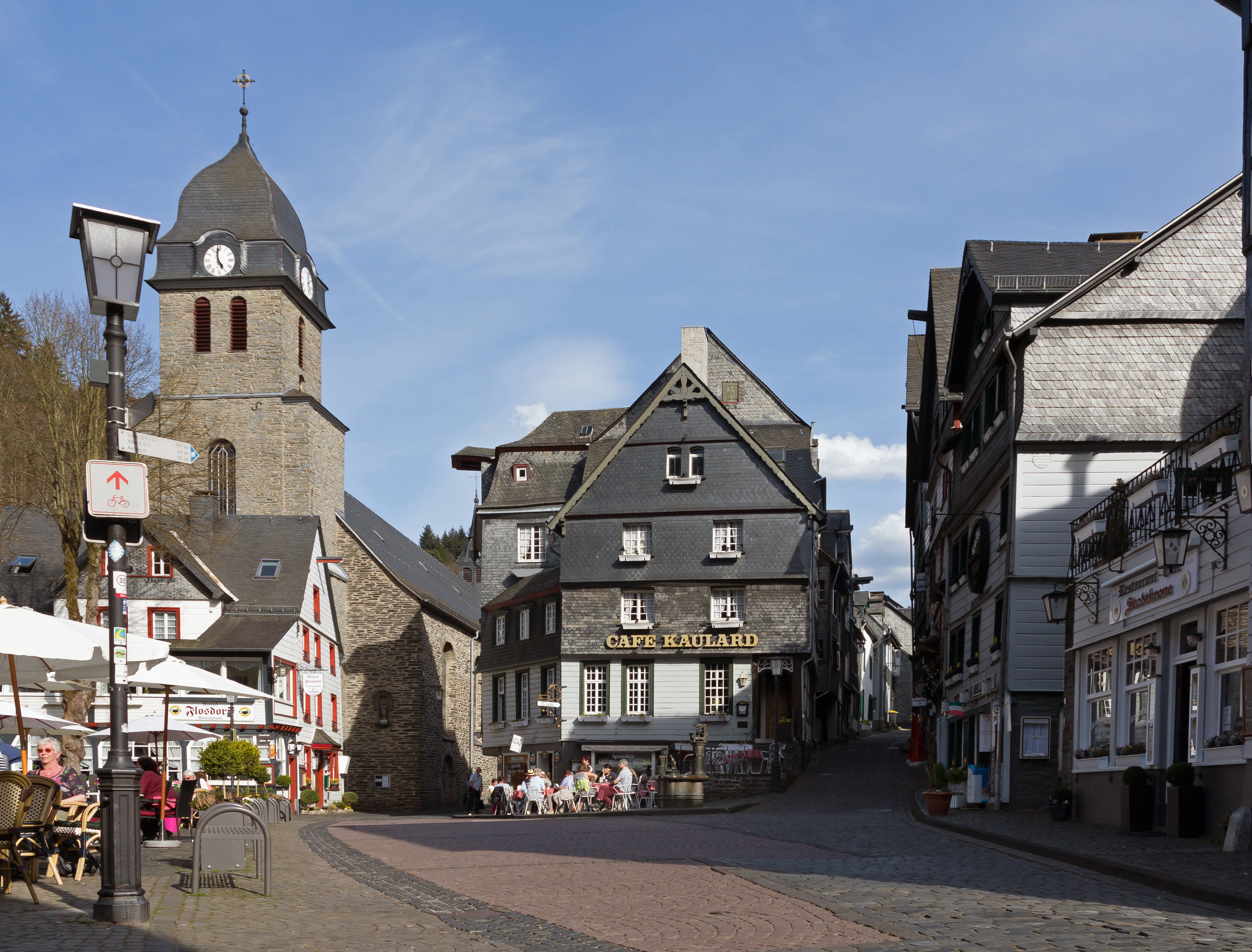
Monschau, view at the Markt

=== Tourism ===
Monschau, which is allowed to call itself a Luftkurort (health resort) since 1996, attracts many visitors with its picturesque views especially in the warm months. Set in the medieval town facility that is traversed by the river Rur, it is dominated by slate paneled and half-timbered houses with cafes, restaurants, craft and souvenir shops. Parking places are placed around the city center.

Part of driving and physical chase scenes in the 2016 film Collide were filmed in and around the centre of Monschau.

== Attractions ==
=== Events ===
Known far beyond the town is the Monschau Christmas market, which is visited every year by tens of thousands of guests.

- The Arts and Culture Centre Monschau (KUK) shows changing art exhibitions

=== Museums ===
- Red House, Foundation-Scheibler Museum: The museums shows the civil living culture between the 18th and 19th centuries. In 1768, the double house was completed. Johann Heinrich Scheibler (1705–1765), the owner, had brought the Monschau cloth industry to full success. The highlight of the equipment is the wooden staircase in the house.
- Caffee roasting Wilhelm Maassen, founded in 1862. There is roasted coffee in old family tradition on an old PROBAT drum roaster, with visitors allowed to watch.
- Brewery Museum Felsenkeller, 150 years of brewing in the historical Monschau brewery, collection of old brewery equipment.
- Senfmühle Monschau, built in 1882.
- Erlebnismuseum Lernort natur: Since 2014, a museum of stuffed animals

=== Buildings ===
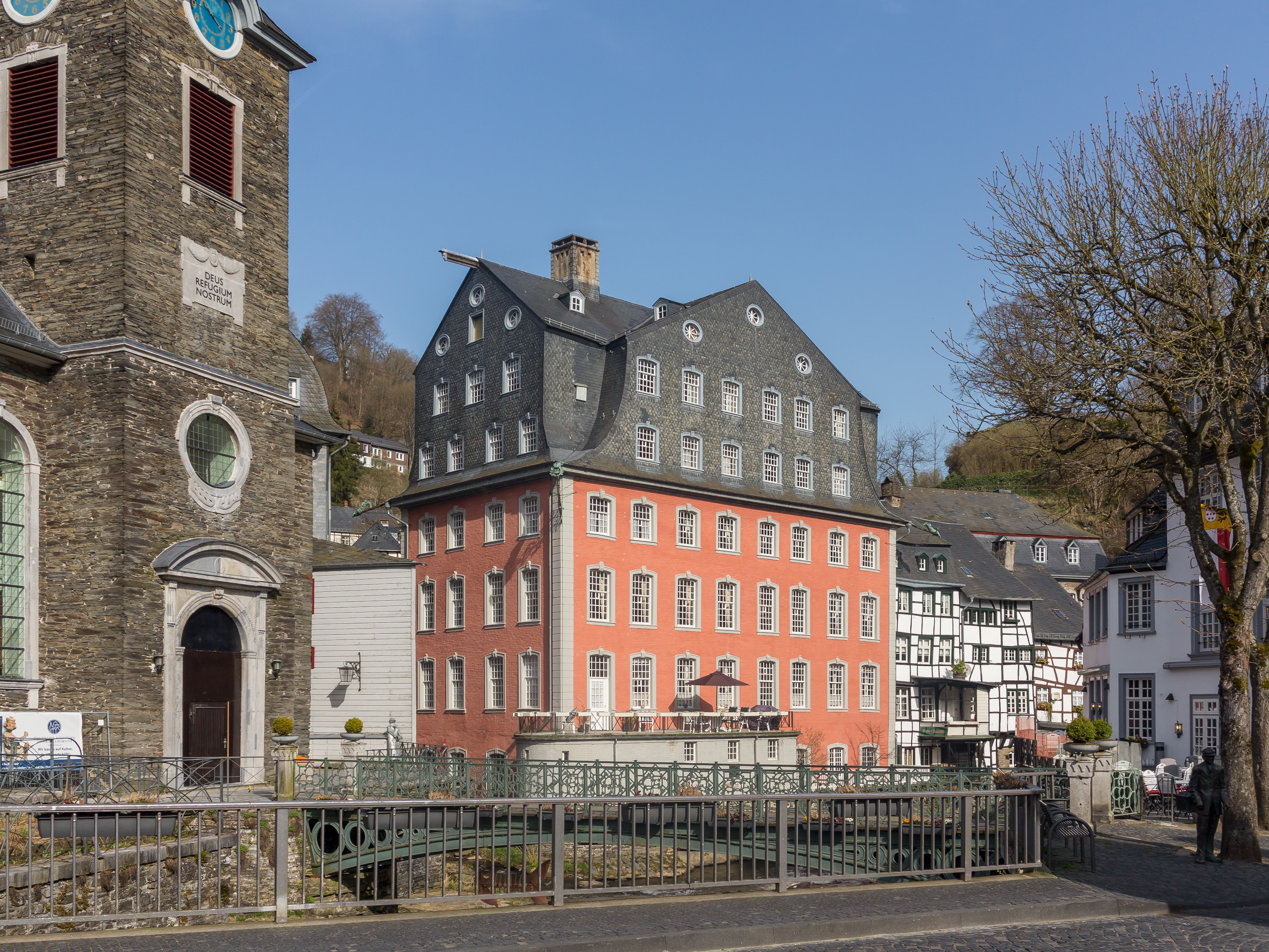
Monschau, monumental house: das Rote Haus

Monschau has over 330 listed buildings, so that only a selection can be called.

- Monschau Castle
- The Protestant Stadtkirche Monschau was built from 1787 to 1789 by Wilhelm Hellwig as a rectangular quarry stone and completed in 1810.
- The Red House of the cloth manufacturers family Scheibler is accessible as a museum today. It is a duplex and was completed in 1768 by Johann Heinrich Scheibler (1705–1765),
- House Troistorff was built in 1783 for the couple Troistorff as a representative town house. It has long been attributed to the Aachen architect Jakob Couven, but this is unlikely.
- St. Mariä Geburt (Monschau) in the style of peasant Baroque, built from 1649 to 1650, an erected in crude rubble masonry Saalbau, with a slightly curved gable roof. Instead of a tower, the church has a ridge turret with a pointed roof. The church is considered as the most beautiful building in the peasant Baroque in the northern Eifel

== Supraregional sport ==
At two meetings in the spring meet canoeists for about 50 years in Monschau international events, and a whitewater races. Nationally known is the Monschau Marathon more than 760 meters of altitude, which takes place in August.

== Infrastructure ==
=== Transportation ===
Monschau is connected by various regional bus routes of Regionalverkehr Euregio Maas-Rhein inter alia to Simmerath, Aachen and Eupen (Belgium). It is the collective tariff of the Aachener Verkehrsverbund. All lines meet at the central station Imgenbroich Bushof. Since March 2016 runs in Monschau an additional responsive demand transport system of the Aachener Straßenbahn und Energieversorgung under the name NetLiner.

The former important Vennbahn, which was used until 2001 as a heritage railway, had stations in Monschau, Konzen and Kaltenherberg, now it is closed. It was remodeled 2010 for the establishment of the Vennbahn (bike path). Through the village runs the Bundesstraße 258 from north to south.

=== Biking trails ===
Through the town lead the cycle paths:

- Eifel Höhen Route, which leads the circuit around the Eifel National Park;
- RurUfer Radweg, which is the highest elevation of the High Fens with the mouth of the Rur in the Maas (French: Meuse).
- Vennbahn (bike path) on the old Vennbahn track between Aachen and Luxembourg.

== Notable residents ==
- Christian Urhan (1790–1845), violin player and composer
- Johann Heinrich Kurtz (1809–1890), lutheran theologian
- Karl Wilhelm Scheibler (1820–1881), industrialist.
- Elwin Bruno Christoffel (1829–1900), physicist and mathematician.
- Vincent Weber, (1902–1990), painter
- Mario Theissen (1952), former BMW Motorsport Director.

== Literature ==
- Wendt, Christoph: Monschau – Idylle zwischen Fels und Fachwerk. Meyer und Meyer, Aachen 1995, ISBN 3-89124-223-9.
- Pippke, Walter, Pallhuber, Ida: Die Eifel. 2. Auflage. Köln 1984 (DuMont Kunst-Reiseführer), S. 42, Farbtafel 13, Abb. 27.

== Gallery ==
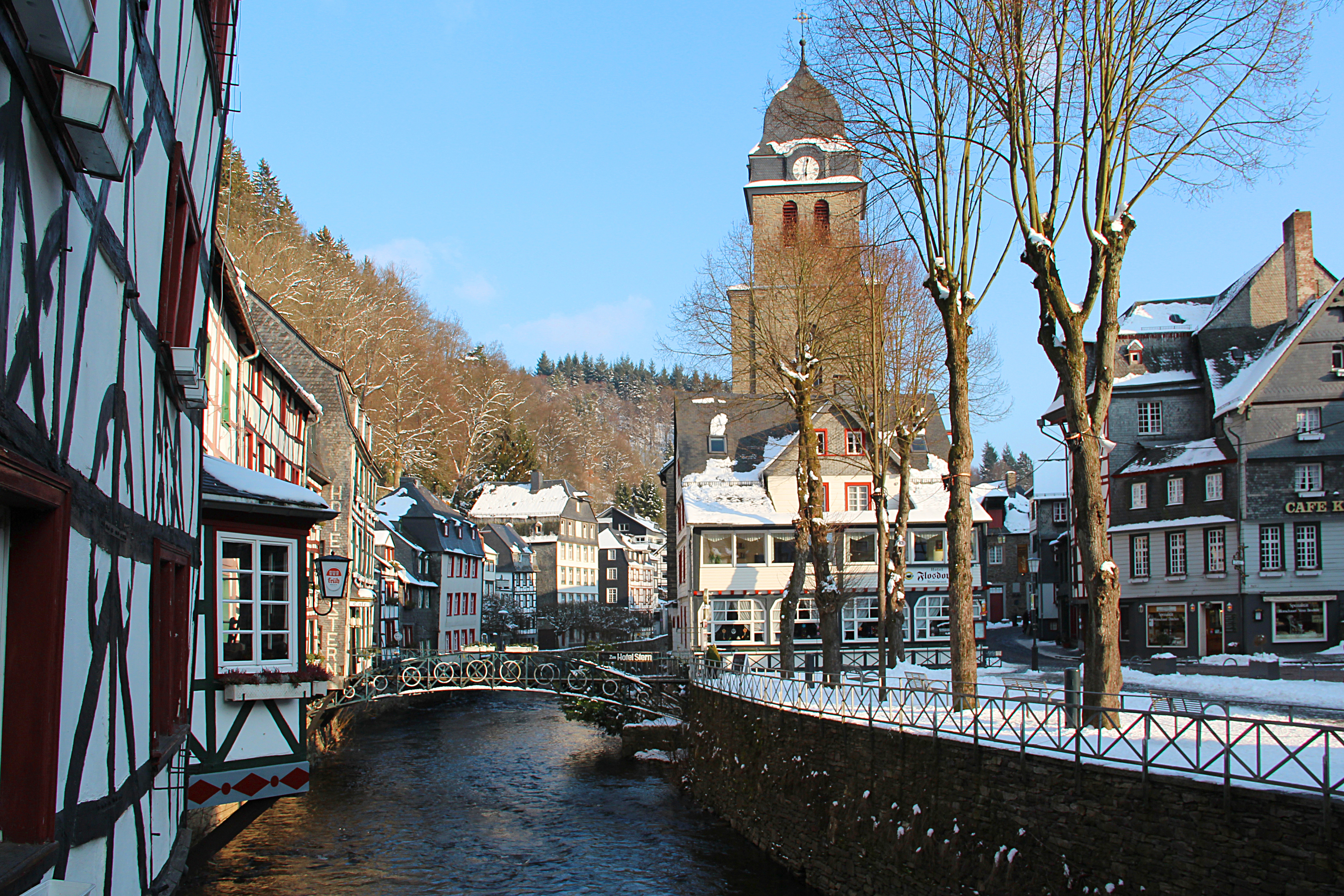
Historic center of Monschau at the Rur

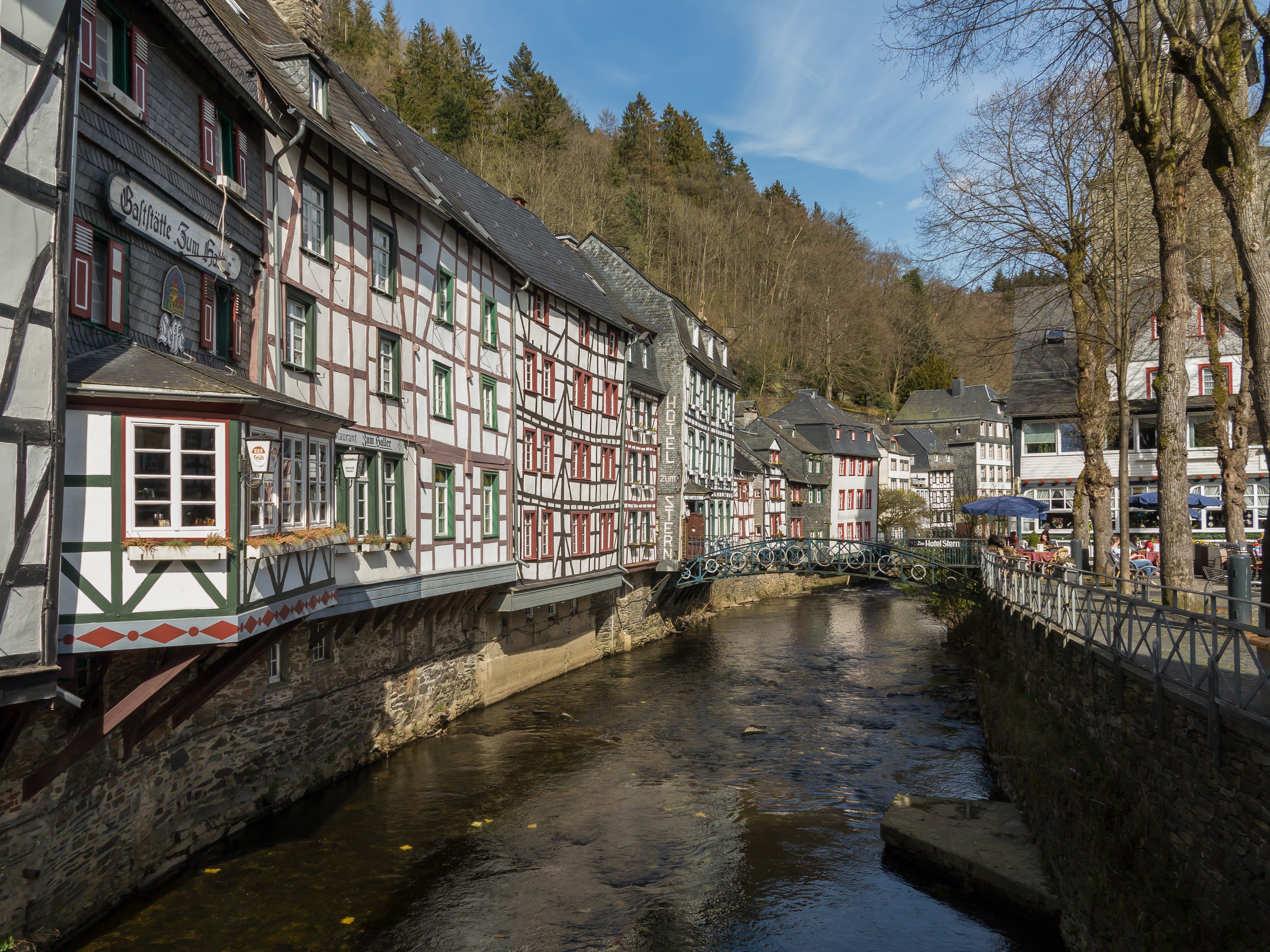
Monschau, timberframe houses

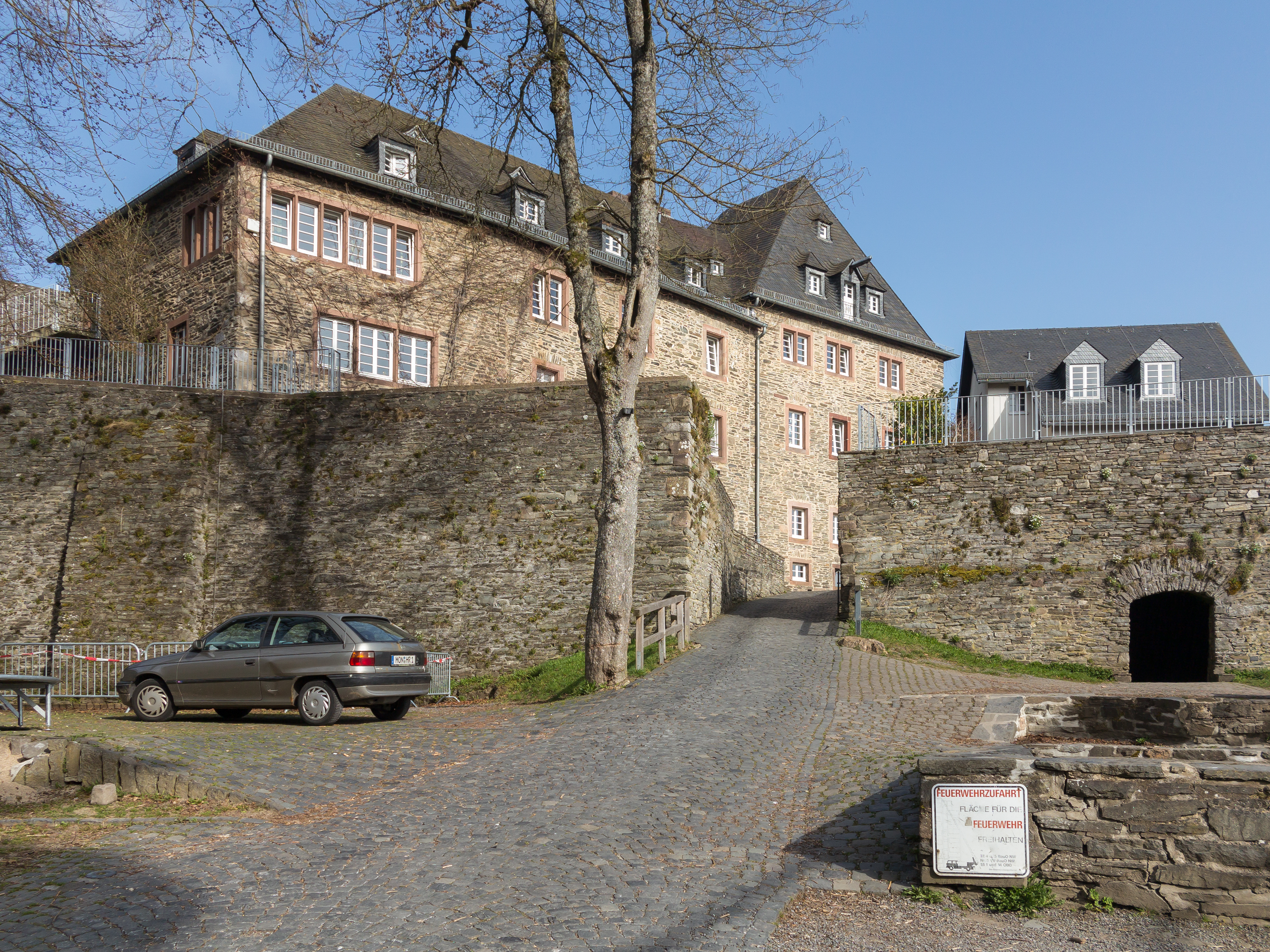
Monschau, castle (Burg Monschau)-youth hostel

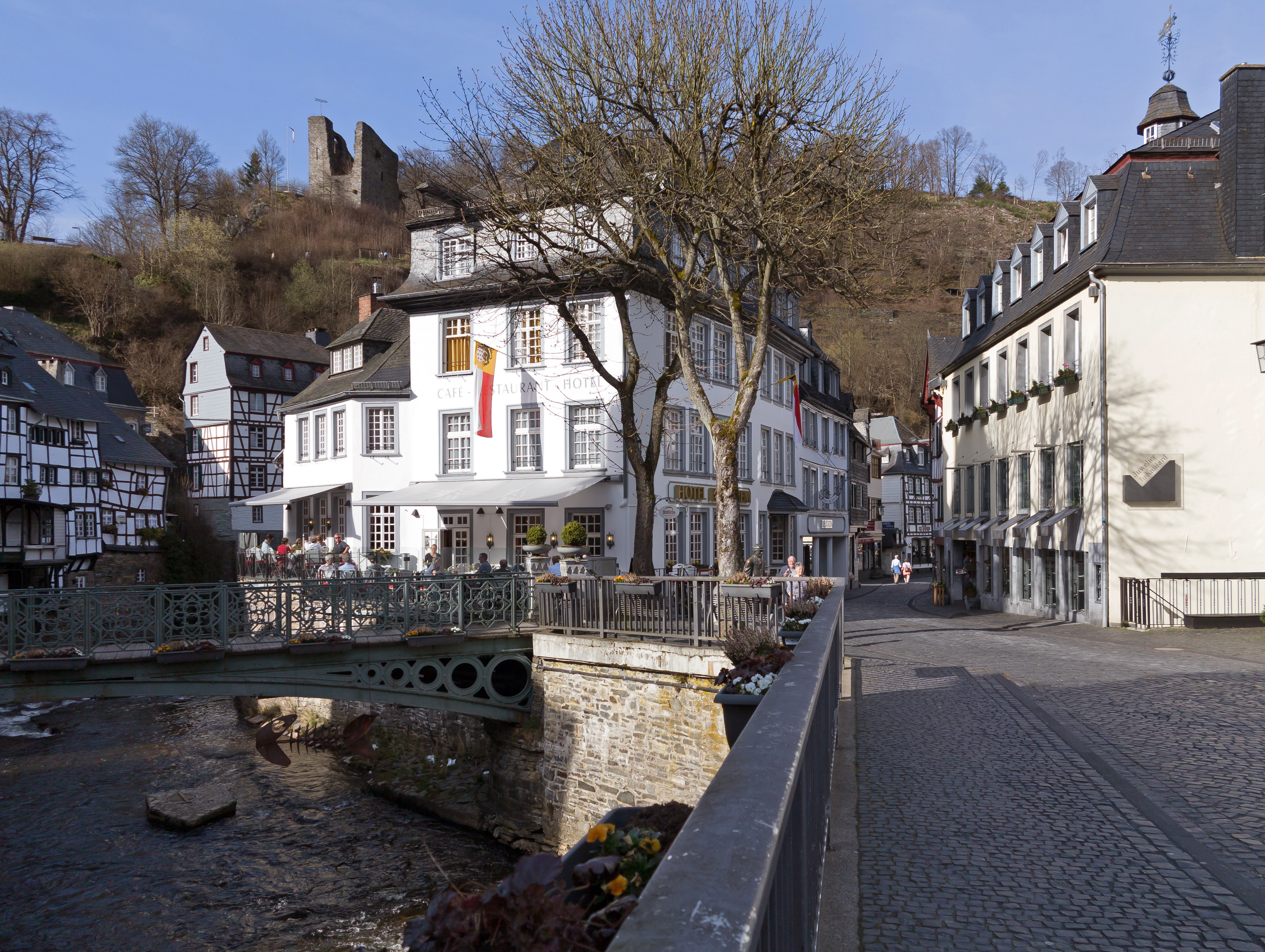
Monschau, hotel in the street

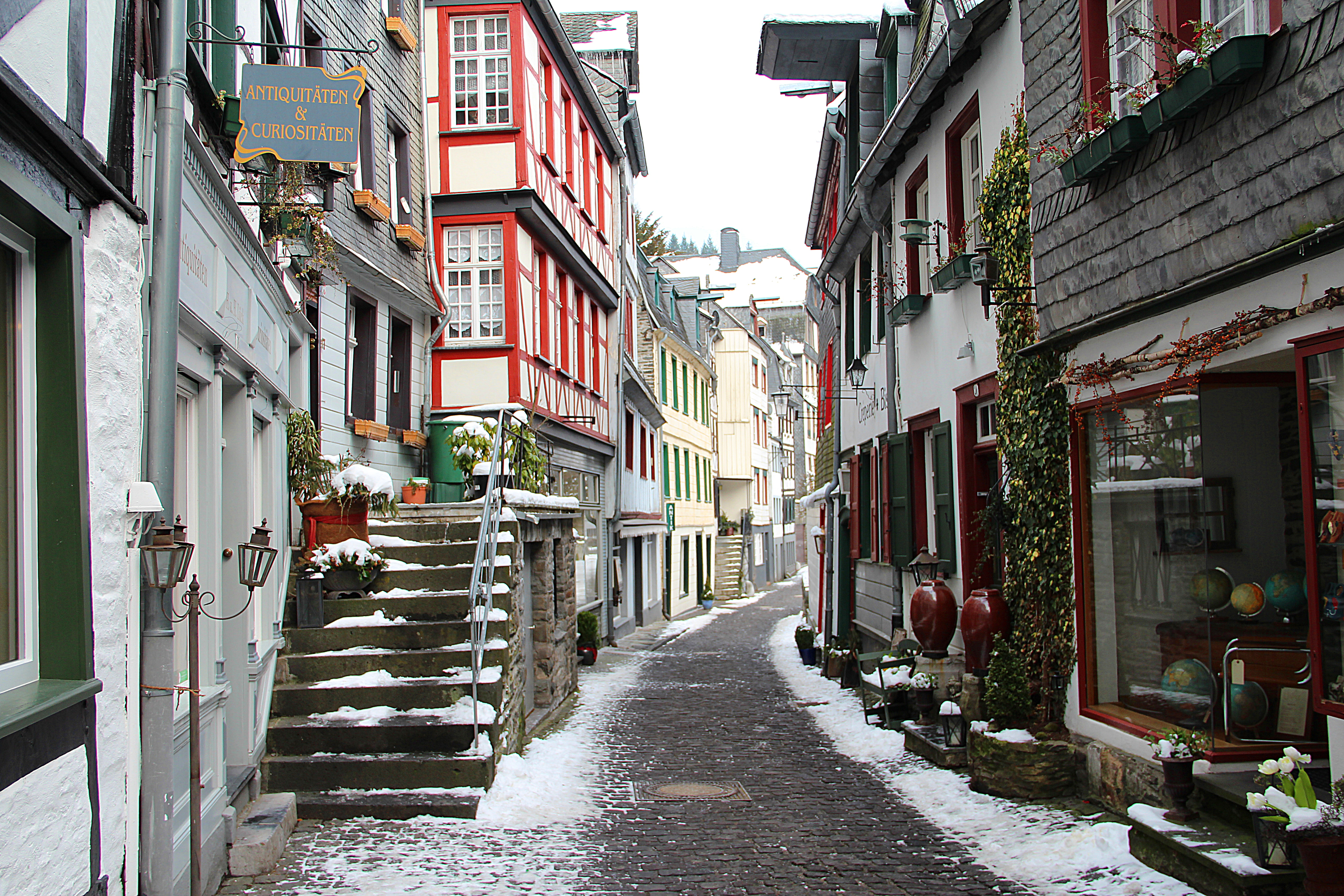
Street in Monschau
