= Mützenich (Monschau) =

- Stadtteil of Monschau
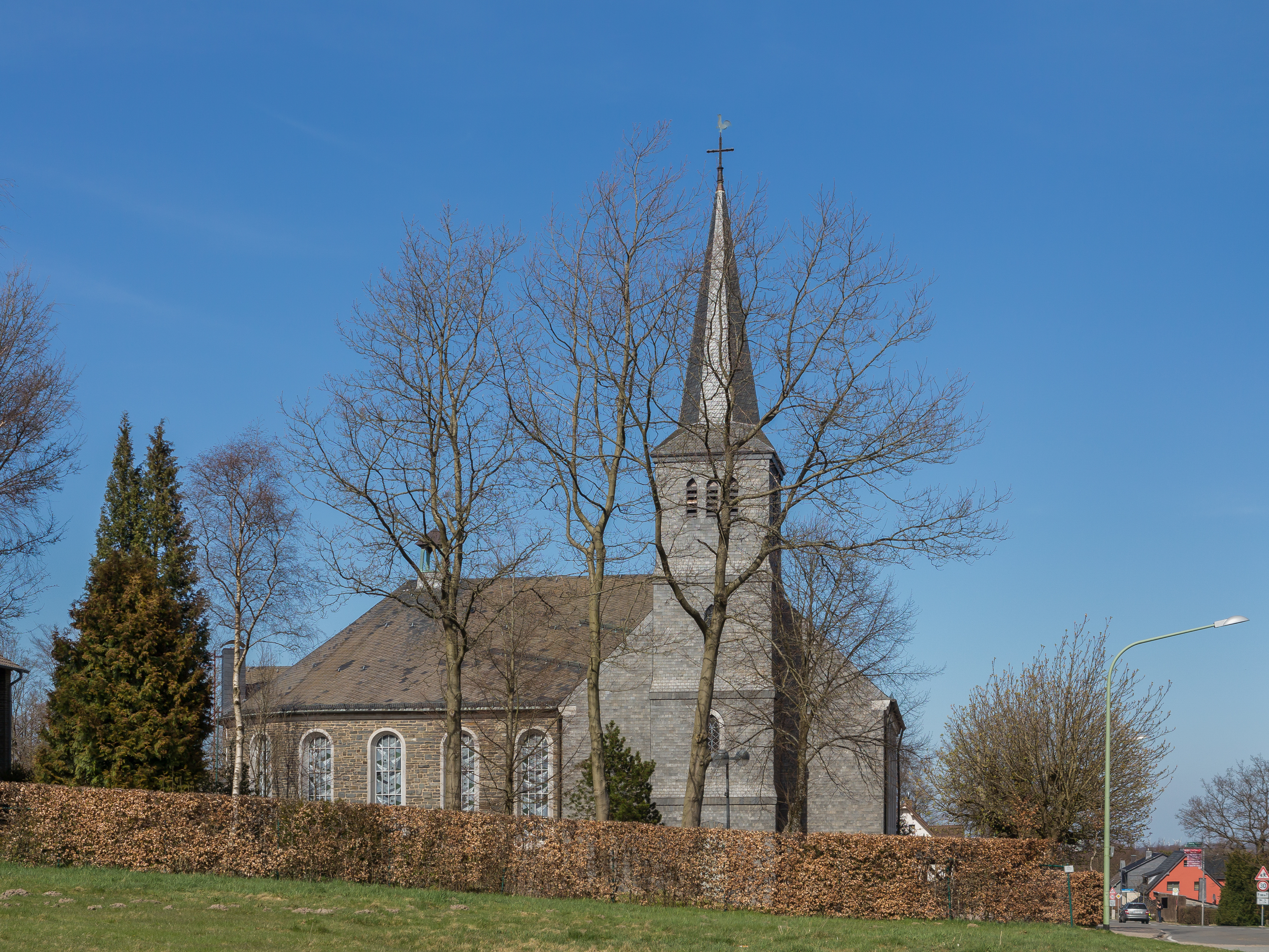
- Mützenich's church

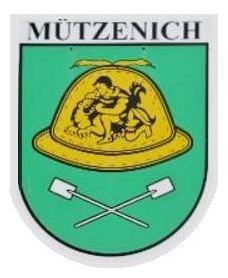
- Coat of arms
- Interactive map of Mützenich
- Location within Germany Location within North Rhine-Westphalia
- Coordinates: 50°34′00″N 06°13′00″E
- Country: Germany
- State: North Rhine-Westphalia
- Admin. region: Köln
- District: Aachen
- Town: Monschau

Area
  - Total: 9.89 km^{2} (3.82 sq mi)
- Elevation: 584 m (1,916 ft)

Population (2015)
  - Total: 2,087
  - Density: 211/km^{2} (547/sq mi)
- Time zone: UTC+01:00 (CET)
  - Summer (DST): UTC+02:00 (CEST)
- Postal codes: 52156
- Vehicle registration: AC / MON
- Website: www.muetzenich.net

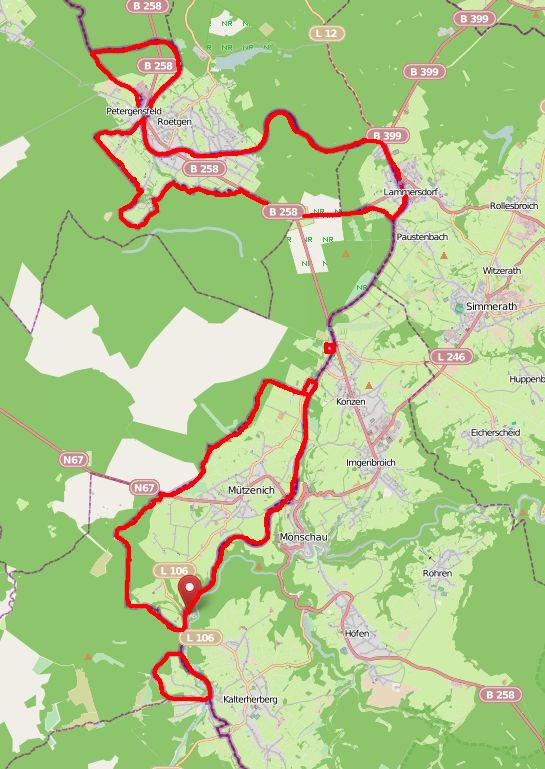
Exclaves created by the Vennbahn track, including Mützenich

Mützenich is a village and former municipality in the district of Aachen, North Rhine-Westphalia, Germany. It is part of the municipality of Monschau since 1972. Notably, Mützenich is a German exclave surrounded by Belgian territory due to the track bed of the former Vennbahn railway line being part of Belgium following the implementation of the Treaty of Versailles, among other small areas.

== Geography ==
Mützenich is located on the German-Belgian border, in the region of the High Fens and below Steling mountain, at 584 m above NHN.

== History ==
One possible derivation of the place name Mützenich is a Roman settlement Mutiniacum. In 1783, peat cutters discovered a Roman helmet and remains of a log road. The road may have been part of the military road Via Mansuerisca. A depiction of the Roman helmet forms part of the coat of arms of the former municipality.

After World War II, Belgium planned to annex the German exclave created by the Vennbahn track, but decided to no longer pursue these plans in April 1949. Mützenich was a major hub for smuggling coffee from Belgium to Germany after the war. The prosecution investigated more than 100 inhabitants for smuggling. In the judicial proceedings, it turned out that nearly all the male youth of Mützenich was involved in smuggling coffee. In 1952, of 53 people indicted for smuggling, 47 were convicted (four were acquitted and the proceedings against two women were dismissed due to insignificance). The local soccer club was relegated to a lower division following this for a lack of players. Several people in the area were killed by gunfire from customs officers. According to official statistics, the death toll at the border in the Aachen region was 31 between 1946 and 1952. There were also two customs officers shot dead, one missing, and more than a hundred people seriously injured among the smugglers as well as the customs officers.

Until 1971, Mützenich was a municipality in the district of Monschau which in turn was part of the larger governmental district (Regierungsbezirk) of Aachen. The district as well as the Regierungsbezirk were dissolved in 1972 and Mützenich became part of the municipality of Monschau.

Aviation pioneer Erich Offermann (1885–1930) raised a hill near Mützenich for flight experiments which started in 1910. The overgrown hill is now located on Belgian territory. In a 1959 publication, Belgian historian Jean de Walque mistook this hill for the commander's hill of a Roman military camp.

== Business ==
There are several guesthouses, hotels and restaurants in Mützenich, retail stores and other trades, as well as milk and meat farmers. Most of the population works outside of the village though, in the surrounding area or in Aachen.

== Historic monuments ==
Some of Monschau's listed historic monuments are located in Mützenich, such as the Catholic church of St. Bartholomew (St. Bartholomäus in German). The church, which was originally built in Gothic revival style in 1847/1848, was enlarged with a modern annex in 1954/1955. The stained glass windows were created in 1961 by Trude Dinnendahl-Benning.

== Tourism ==
Mützenich is a destination for hiking, jogging, cycling, and cross-country skiing. Many hiking trails lead into the High Fens. From Aachen, it is about a 40 minutes drive by car to Mützenich. There are also bus lines to Mützenich.

A landmark about one kilometre north of the village is Kaiser Karls Bettstatt ("Emperor Charlemagne's resting place"), a slab of quartzite near Steling mountain and by one of the major tracks into the High Fens. According to legend, Charlemagne got lost one day while hunting and rested on this slab for one night. There is also a humorous legend regarding the origin of the name of Mützenich connected to this: As he rested on the slab in cold weather, Charlemagne was offered a cap (in German, Mütze) by a servant, which the emperor then refused by saying in local dialect Mütze nich! ("Cap - not!").
