= Heinsberg (electoral district) =

Federal electoral district of Germany

88 Heinsberg
- Electoral district for the Bundestag
- Heinsberg in 2025
- State: North Rhine-Westphalia
- Population: 255,600 (2019)
- Electorate: 192,346 (2021)
- Major settlements: Erkelenz; Heinsberg; Hückelhoven
- Area: 627.9 km^{2}

Current electoral district
- Created: 1949
- Party: CDU
- Member: Wilfried Oellers
- Elected: 2013, 2017, 2021, 2025

Heinsberg is an electoral constituency (German: Wahlkreis) represented in the Bundestag. It elects one member via first-past-the-post voting. Under the current constituency numbering system, it is designated as constituency 88. It is located in western North Rhine-Westphalia, comprising the Heinsberg district.

Heinsberg was created for the inaugural 1949 federal election. Since 2013, it has been represented by Wilfried Oellers of the Christian Democratic Union (CDU).

== Geography ==
Heinsberg is located in western North Rhine-Westphalia. As of the 2021 federal election, it is coterminous with the Heinsberg district.

== History ==
Heinsberg was created in 1949, then known as Geilenkirchen – Erkelenz – Jülich. In the 1965 and 1969 elections, it was named Geilenkirchen – Heinsberg. It acquired its current name in the 1972 election. In the 1949 election, it was North Rhine-Westphalia constituency 3 in the numbering system. In the 1953 through 1961 elections, it was number 62. From 1965 through 1998, it was number 55. From 2002 through 2009, it was number 90. In the 2013 through 2021 elections, it was number 89. From the 2025 election, it has been number 88.

Originally, the constituency comprised the districts of Geilenkirchen-Heinsberg, Erkelenz, and Jülich. In the 1965 and 1969 elections, it comprised the districts of Geilenkirchen and Heinsberg. In the 1972 election, it was coterminous with Heinsberg district. In the 1976 election, it also contained the municipality of Niederkrüchten from the Viersen district. It acquired its current borders in the 1980 election.

Election	No.	Name	Borders
1949	3	Geilenkirchen – Erkelenz – Jülich	Geilenkirchen-Heinsberg district; Erkelenz district; Jülich district
1953	62	Geilenkirchen – Erkelenz – Jülich	Geilenkirchen-Heinsberg district; Erkelenz district; Jülich district
1957	62	Geilenkirchen – Erkelenz – Jülich	Geilenkirchen-Heinsberg district; Erkelenz district; Jülich district
1961	62	Geilenkirchen – Erkelenz – Jülich	Geilenkirchen-Heinsberg district; Erkelenz district; Jülich district
1965	55	Geilenkirchen – Heinsberg	Geilenkirchen-Heinsberg district; Erkelenz district; Jülich district
1969	55	Geilenkirchen – Heinsberg	Geilenkirchen-Heinsberg district; Erkelenz district; Jülich district
1972	55	Heinsberg	Heinsberg district
1976	55	Heinsberg	Heinsberg district; Viersen district (only Niederkrüchten municipality)
1980	55	Heinsberg	Heinsberg district
1983	55	Heinsberg	Heinsberg district
1987	55	Heinsberg	Heinsberg district
1990	55	Heinsberg	Heinsberg district
1994	55	Heinsberg	Heinsberg district
1998	55	Heinsberg	Heinsberg district
2002	90	Heinsberg	Heinsberg district
2005	90	Heinsberg	Heinsberg district
2009	90	Heinsberg	Heinsberg district
2013	89	Heinsberg	Heinsberg district
2017	89	Heinsberg	Heinsberg district
2021	89	Heinsberg	Heinsberg district
2025	88	Heinsberg	Heinsberg district

== Members ==
The constituency has been held continuously by the Christian Democratic Union (CDU) since its creation. It was first represented by Karl Müller from 1949 to 1957, followed by Karl Arnold for a single term. Fritz Burgbacher was elected in 1961 and served until 1972. Adolf Freiherr Spies von Büllesheim served until 1987, followed by Karl H. Fell until 1998. Leo Dautzenberg was elected in the 1998 election and served until 2013. Wilfried Oellers was elected in 2013, and re-elected in 2017, 2021 and 2025.

Election	Member	Party	%
1949	Karl Müller	CDU	64.2
1953	Karl Müller	CDU	71.0
1957	Karl Arnold	CDU	72.6
1961	Fritz Burgbacher	CDU	64.4
1965	Fritz Burgbacher	CDU	63.1
1969	Fritz Burgbacher	CDU	60.9
1972	Adolf Freiherr Spies von Büllesheim	CDU	59.9
1976	Adolf Freiherr Spies von Büllesheim	CDU	61.4
1980	Adolf Freiherr Spies von Büllesheim	CDU	58.4
1983	Adolf Freiherr Spies von Büllesheim	CDU	62.8
1987	Karl H. Fell	CDU	57.6
1990	Karl H. Fell	CDU	55.8
1994	Karl H. Fell	CDU	53.4
1998	Leo Dautzenberg	CDU	49.2
2002	Leo Dautzenberg	CDU	50.3
2005	Leo Dautzenberg	CDU	51.4
2009	Leo Dautzenberg	CDU	50.4
2013	Wilfried Oellers	CDU	53.4
2017	Wilfried Oellers	CDU	45.6
2021	Wilfried Oellers	CDU	39.7
2025	Wilfried Oellers	CDU	41.5

== Election results ==
=== 2025 election ===
Federal election (2026): Heinsberg
Notes:	Blue background denotes the winner of the electorate vote. Pink background denotes a candidate elected from their party list. Yellow background denotes an electorate win by a list member, or other incumbent. A ✓ or ✗ denotes status of any incumbent, win or lose respectively.						
Party	Candidate	Votes	%	±%	Party votes	%	±%
CDU	✓ Wilfried Oellers	64,623	41.5	▲1.8	54,975	35.2	▲3.0
AfD	Hans Spenrath	30,788	19.8	▲12.2	31,410	20.1	▲12.2
SPD	Christoph Nießen	29,810	19.2	▼6.8	26,662	17.1	▼9.9
Greens	Inga Mendel	11,799	7.6	▼3.1	13,621	8.7	▼3.0
Left	Max Winkowski	8,958	5.8	▲3.2	9,855	6.3	▲3.2
BSW					6,076	3.9	
FDP	Klaus Wagner	4,680	3.0	▼4.4	6,516	4.2	▼7.0
FW	Guido Schmitz	2,800	1.8	▲0.2	1,208	0.8	▼0.2
Tierschutzpartei					2,443	1.6	▼0.1
Volt	Isatou Fahrenholz-Böhlig	2,101	1.4		1,076	0.7	▲0.4
PARTEI				▼3.4	854	0.5	▼0.8
dieBasis				▼1.1	449	0.3	▼0.8
Humanists					285	0.2	▲0.2
Team Todenhöfer					250	0.2	▼0.1
BD					178	0.1	
Values					105	0.1	
MERA25					48	0.0	
MLPD					22	0.0	0.0
Pirates							▼0.14
Gesundheitsforschung							▼0.1
ÖDP							▼0.1
Bündnis C							0.0
SGP							0.0
Informal votes		1,588			1,114		
Total valid votes		155,559			156,033		
Turnout		157,147	81.7	▲6.7			
CDU hold	Majority	33,835	21.7	▼10.4			

=== 2021 election ===
Federal election (2021): Heinsberg
Notes:	Blue background denotes the winner of the electorate vote. Pink background denotes a candidate elected from their party list. Yellow background denotes an electorate win by a list member, or other incumbent. A ✓ or ✗ denotes status of any incumbent, win or lose respectively.						
Party	Candidate	Votes	%	±%	Party votes	%	±%
CDU	✓ Wilfried Oellers	57,095	39.7	▼5.9	46,466	32.3	▼7.2
SPD	Norbert Spinrath	37,249	25.9	▼2.0	38,822	27.0	▲1.1
Greens	Dignanllely Meurer	15,368	10.7	▲5.7	16,858	11.7	▲6.5
AfD	Hermann Navel	10,965	7.6	▼0.7	11,359	7.9	▼0.9
FDP	Alexander Dorner	10,691	7.4	▲0.8	16,023	11.1	▼0.3
PARTEI	Mark Benecke	4,901	3.4		1,929	1.3	▲0.8
Left	Rüdiger Birmann	3,608	2.5	▼2.1	4,529	3.1	▼2.5
Tierschutzpartei					2,334	1.6	▲0.8
FW	Hans-Peter Weiland	2,288	1.6	▲0.5	1,375	1.0	▲0.4
dieBasis	Michael Aggelidis	1,554	1.1		1,602	1.1	
Pirates					532	0.4	▼0.1
Team Todenhöfer					438	0.3	
Volt					382	0.3	
LIEBE					235	0.2	
Gesundheitsforschung					210	0.1	▲0.1
NPD					209	0.1	▼0.2
LfK					155	0.1	
V-Partei3					109	0.1	0.0
ÖDP					87	0.1	0.0
Humanists					75	0.1	0.0
Bündnis C					53	0.0	
PdF					47	0.0	
LKR					30	0.0	
MLPD					18	0.0	0.0
SGP					14	0.0	0.0
DKP					10	0.0	0.0
Informal votes		1,649			1,397		
Total valid votes		143,719			143,971		
Turnout		145,368	75.6	▲0.7			
CDU hold	Majority	19,846	13.8	▼3.9			

=== 2017 election ===
Federal election (2017): Heinsberg
Notes:	Blue background denotes the winner of the electorate vote. Pink background denotes a candidate elected from their party list. Yellow background denotes an electorate win by a list member, or other incumbent. A ✓ or ✗ denotes status of any incumbent, win or lose respectively.						
Party	Candidate	Votes	%	±%	Party votes	%	±%
CDU	✓ Wilfried Oellers	64,121	45.6	▼7.8	55,605	39.5	▼9.9
SPD	Norbert Spinrath	39,301	28.0	▼0.3	36,421	25.9	▼0.5
AfD	Hermann Navel	11,652	8.3	▲6.0	12,313	8.7	▲5.2
FDP	Klaus Jürgen Wagner	9,334	6.6	▲4.4	16,111	11.4	▲6.5
Greens	Christoph Stolzenberger	6,964	5.0	▼0.7	7,281	5.2	▼0.4
Left	Wolfram Steinhage	6,424	4.6	▲0.2	7,909	5.6	▲0.4
Tierschutzpartei					1,179	0.8	
PARTEI					805	0.6	▲0.2
FW	Sascha Mattern	1,536	1.1		747	0.5	▲0.2
Pirates	Kai Torsten Boxberg	1,272	0.9	▼1.6	669	0.5	▼1.8
NPD					457	0.3	▼0.8
AD-DEMOKRATEN					368	0.3	
V-Partei³					150	0.1	
DiB					149	0.1	
Volksabstimmung					137	0.1	▼0.1
Gesundheitsforschung					134	0.1	
ÖDP					123	0.1	0.0
DM					119	0.1	
BGE					100	0.1	
Die Humanisten					61	0.0	
MLPD					46	0.0	0.0
DKP					8	0.0	
SGP					8	0.0	0.0
Informal votes		1,726			1,440		
Total valid votes		140,604			140,890		
Turnout		142,330	74.9	▲3.4			
CDU hold	Majority	24,820	17.6	▼7.5			

=== 2013 election ===
Federal election (2013): Heinsberg
Notes:	Blue background denotes the winner of the electorate vote. Pink background denotes a candidate elected from their party list. Yellow background denotes an electorate win by a list member, or other incumbent. A ✓ or ✗ denotes status of any incumbent, win or lose respectively.						
Party	Candidate	Votes	%	±%	Party votes	%	±%
CDU	Wilfried Oellers	70,649	53.4	▲3.0	65,417	49.3	▲7.8
SPD	Norbert Spinrath	37,444	28.3	▲4.2	34,895	26.3	▲4.8
Greens	Hans Josef Dederichs	7,511	5.7	▼1.2	7,336	5.5	▼1.6
Left	Ayten Kaplan	5,720	4.3	▼3.3	6,915	5.2	▼3.0
Pirates	Katharina Lenzen	3,310	2.5		3,019	2.3	▲0.8
AfD	Hermann Navel	3,043	2.3		4,652	3.5	
FDP	Linus Kester Stieldorf	2,921	2.2	▼7.3	6,543	4.9	▼11.5
NPD	Heiko Glowka	1,718	1.3	▼0.2	1,427	1.1	▼0.1
PARTEI					556	0.4	
FW					437	0.3	
REP					254	0.2	▼0.1
PRO					251	0.2	
Volksabstimmung					231	0.2	▲0.1
Nichtwahler					195	0.1	
ÖDP					145	0.1	0.0
Party of Reason					112	0.1	
RRP					77	0.1	▼0.1
BIG					60	0.0	
PSG					44	0.0	0.0
BüSo					29	0.0	0.0
Die Rechte					26	0.0	
MLPD					18	0.0	0.0
Informal votes		2,205			1,882		
Total valid votes		132,316			132,639		
Turnout		134,521	71.5	▲1.2			
CDU hold	Majority	33,205	25.1	▼1.2			

=== 2009 election ===
Federal election (2009): Heinsberg
Notes:	Blue background denotes the winner of the electorate vote. Pink background denotes a candidate elected from their party list. Yellow background denotes an electorate win by a list member, or other incumbent. A ✓ or ✗ denotes status of any incumbent, win or lose respectively.						
Party	Candidate	Votes	%	±%	Party votes	%	±%
CDU	✓ Leo Dautzenberg	65,143	50.4	▼1.1	53,888	41.5	▼1.7
SPD	Norbert Spinrath	31,111	24.1	▼13.2	27,877	21.5	▼11.1
FDP	Andreas Rademachers	12,342	9.5	▲4.3	21,315	16.4	▲5.7
Left	Christa Frohn	9,859	7.6	▲3.0	10,638	8.2	▲3.1
Greens	Gisela Johlke	8,933	6.9		9,307	7.2	▲2.0
Pirates					1,976	1.5	
NPD	Helmut Gudat	1,964	1.5	▲0.1	1,532	1.2	▲0.2
Tierschutzpartei					1,047	0.8	▲0.3
FAMILIE					784	0.6	▲0.1
RENTNER					420	0.3	
REP					413	0.3	▼0.2
RRP					199	0.2	
Volksabstimmung					145	0.1	0.0
ÖDP					94	0.1	
DVU					73	0.1	
Centre					69	0.1	0.0
BüSo					24	0.0	▼0.0
PSG					20	0.0	0.0
MLPD					17	0.0	0.0
Informal votes		2,409			1,923		
Total valid votes		129,352			129,838		
Turnout		131,761	70.2	▼7.1			
CDU hold	Majority	34,032	26.3	▲12.2			

=== 2005 election ===
Federal election (2005): Heinsberg
Notes:	Blue background denotes the winner of the electorate vote. Pink background denotes a candidate elected from their party list. Yellow background denotes an electorate win by a list member, or other incumbent. A ✓ or ✗ denotes status of any incumbent, win or lose respectively.						
Party	Candidate	Votes	%	±%	Party votes	%	±%
CDU	✓ Leo Dautzenberg	71,887	51.4	▲1.1	60,704	43.2	▼2.3
SPD	Norbert Spinrath	52,148	37.3	▲0.4	45,723	32.5	▼3.4
FDP	Felix Becker	7,345	5.3	▼0.9	15,059	10.7	▲1.2
Left	Christa Frohn	6,512	4.7	▲3.5	7,193	5.1	▲4.2
NPD	Helmut Gudat	13,162	9.3	▲4.9	18,398	12.9	▲7.5
Greens					7,250	5.2	▼0.6
Tierschutzpartei					781	0.6	▲0.1
Familie					718	0.5	▲0.2
REP					716	0.5	▲0.1
GRAUEN					485	0.3	▲0.2
PBC					131	0.1	
From Now on... Democracy Through Referendum					124	0.1	
Socialist Equality Party					58	0.0	
BüSo					56	0.0	
Centre					45	0.0	
MLPD					29	0.0	0.0
Informal votes		3,424			2,738		
Total valid votes		139,824			140,510		
Turnout		143,248	77.3	▼2.7			
CDU hold	Majority	19,739	14.1				
