= Waldfeucht =

- Municipality
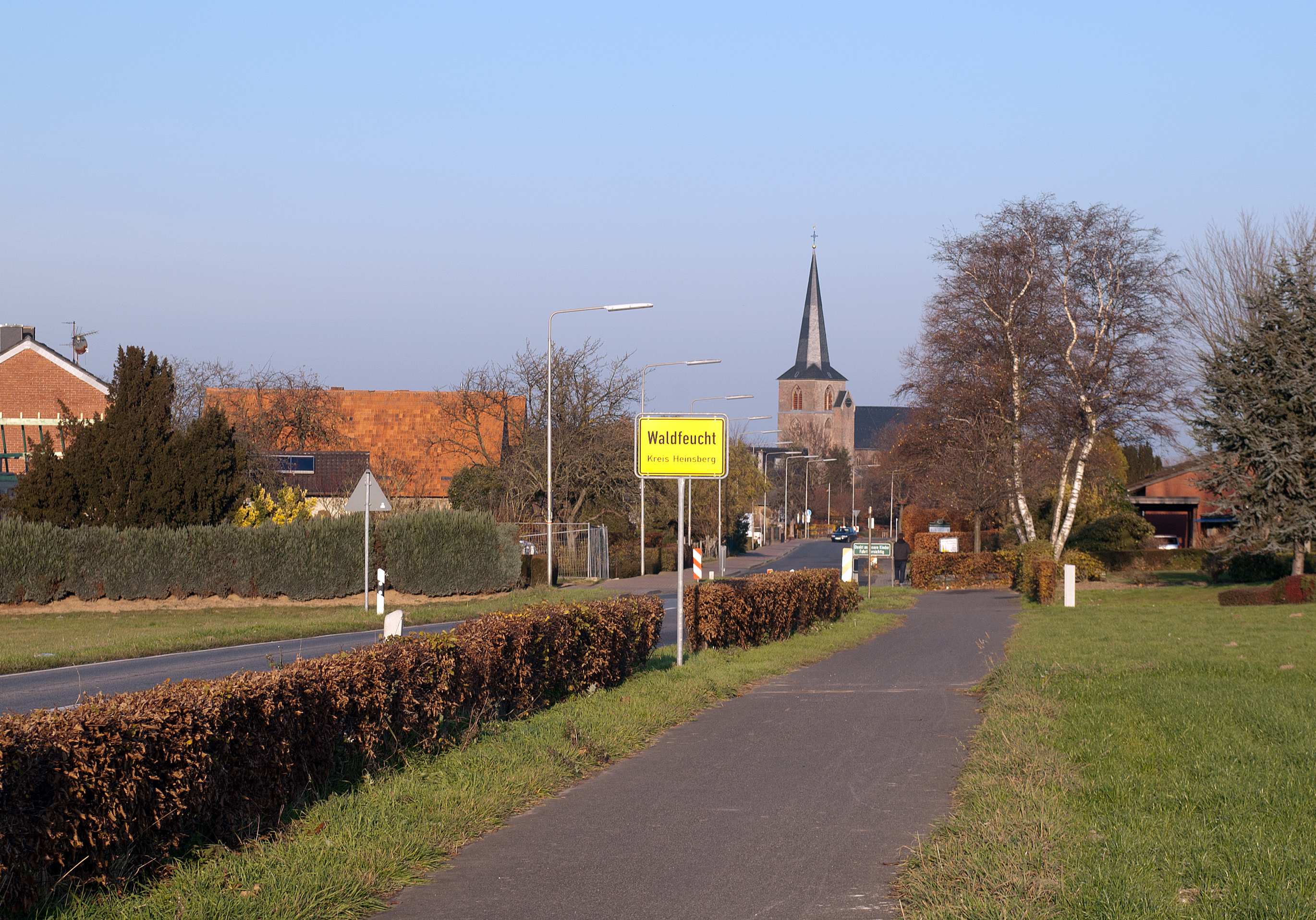

- Flag Coat of arms

- Location of Waldfeucht within Heinsberg district
- Interactive map of Waldfeucht
- Location within Germany Location within North Rhine-Westphalia
- Coordinates: 51°04′17″N 05°58′59″E
- Country: Germany
- State: North Rhine-Westphalia
- Admin. region: Köln
- District: Heinsberg

Government
  - Mayor (2020–25): Heinz-Josef Schrammen (CDU)

Area
  - Total: 30.27 km^{2} (11.69 sq mi)
- Elevation: 31–72 m (102–236 ft)

Population (2025-12-31)
  - Total: 9,235
  - Density: 305.1/km^{2} (790.2/sq mi)
- Time zone: UTC+01:00 (CET)
  - Summer (DST): UTC+02:00 (CEST)
- Postal codes: 52525
- Dialling codes: 02455, 02452
- Vehicle registration: HS
- Website: www.waldfeucht.de

Waldfeucht (German pronunciation: [ˈvaltˌfɔʏçt]; Limburgish: Vuch [ˈvʏx]) is a German municipality in the Heinsberg district, in North Rhine-Westphalia, Federal Republic of Germany. It is situated on the border with the Kingdom of the Netherlands, approx. 15 km south of Roermond and 8 km west of Heinsberg.

== Geography ==
Waldfeucht is located west of Heinsberg in the Selfkant natural area between the Wurm river in the east and the Meuse river in the west.

To the west, the border between the Netherlands and Germany forms the municipal boundary over a length of about 10 km. The highest point in the community is 72.7 m above sea level, Normalnull is located south of the "Breuner Maar" between Bocket and Breberen, the lowest point 31.7 m is in the Kitscher Bruch between the villages of Haaren and Karken on the municipal border.

The municipal area extends 8.5 km north to south and it is 6.0 km from west to east.

=== Population centers ===
In addition to the town of Waldfeucht, these villages belong to the municipality:

- Bocket
- Braunsrath
- Brüggelchen
- Frilinghoven
- Haaren
- Hontem
- Löcken
- Obspringen
- Schöndorf
- Selsten

== History ==
Traces of settlement and prehistoric burial grounds prove the presence of people in the Waldfeucht municipal area since the 4th millennium BC. Today's communities are either Franconian settlements of the 6th and 7th centuries, or they emerged as clearing settlements in the 9th and 10th centuries. They are all mentioned in documents from the 12th and 13th centuries.

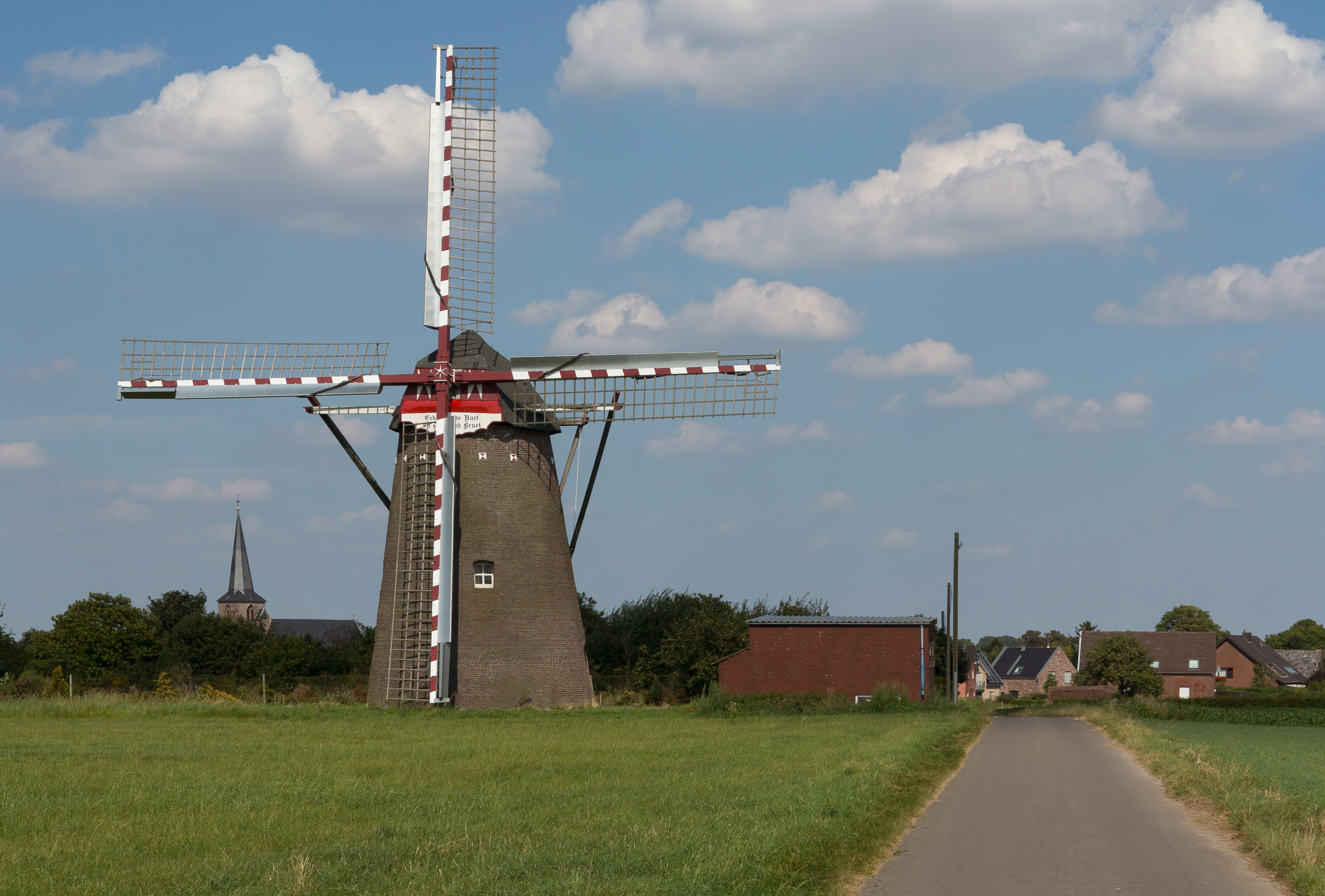
Waldfeucht, windmill

As early as the 13th century, the village of Waldfeucht was the most important place in the surrounding area, which went beyond today's municipal boundaries, it was called a "city" and had market rights. The location on the Roman road from Heerlen - Xanten and on the road that led from Heinsberg through the Echter Bruch into the Maasland contributed significantly to this development and led to the fact that the ownership of Waldfeucht was disputed between the rival territories of Geldern, Burgundy, Brabant and Heinsberg for centuries. The fortifications around Waldfeucht, today characterized by hedge paths and cottage gardens, which consisted of ramparts, ditches and two city gates destroyed in World War II, bear witness to these times.

The abundance of forests and the fertile arable soils formed the basis for the community's economic life in the Middle Ages . Very early on, handicrafts and trading companies settled in Waldfeucht, from which tanning and brewing trades were carried out up until today. The metalworking and blacksmithing trade was in full bloom in Waldfeucht in the 16th century. Linen and velvet weaving was also carried out in Waldfeucht until the 19th century.

The demarcation established by the Congress of Vienna in 1815 cut up a cultural and economic area that had grown over the centuries. Waldfeucht became part of the Rhine Province and became a border town. Today's municipality of Waldfeucht was formed in connection with the Aachen Act on January 1, 1972 from the former office of Waldfeucht with the municipalities of Braunsrath, Haaren and Waldfeucht, as well as the districts of Haas and Haaserdriesch of the former municipality of Kirchhoven.

== Population ==
Historical population

Year	Pop.	±% p.a.
1965	6,349	—
1970	6,663	+0.97%
1975	6,799	+0.40%
1980	7,114	+0.91%
1985	7,609	+1.35%
1990	7,954	+0.89%
1995	8,724	+1.87%

Year	Pop.	±% p.a.
2000	9,331	+1.35%
2005	9,409	+0.17%
2010	9,196	−0.46%
2015	8,861	−0.74%
2020	8,912	+0.11%
2025	9,235	+0.71%

Source: Landesdatabank Nordrhein-Westfalen
