= Heinsberg =

- Town
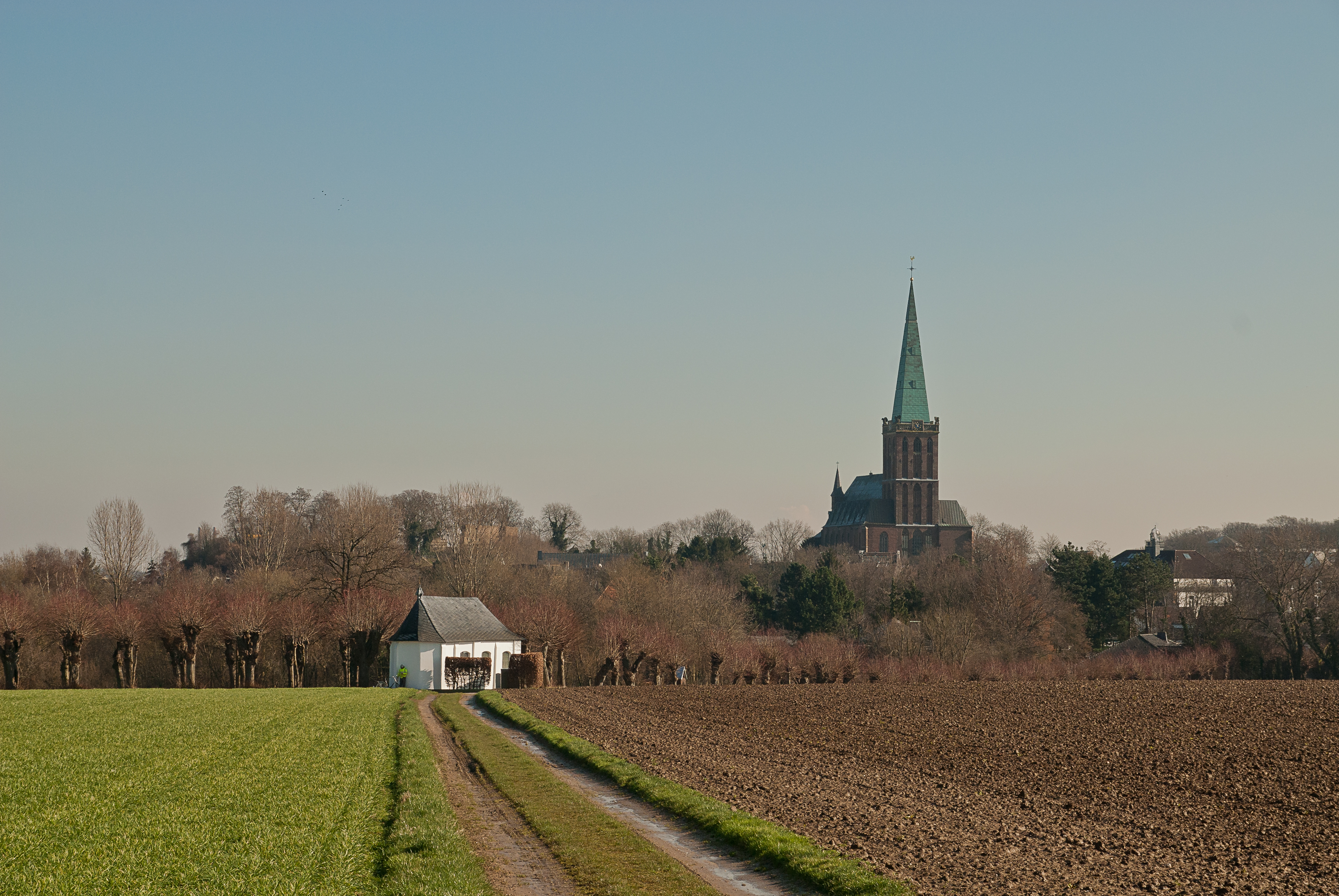

- Coat of arms

- Location of Heinsberg within Heinsberg district
- Interactive map of Heinsberg
- Location within Germany Location within North Rhine-Westphalia
- Coordinates: 51°03′47″N 06°05′47″E
- Country: Germany
- State: North Rhine-Westphalia
- Admin. region: Köln
- District: Heinsberg
- Subdivisions: 14

Government
  - Mayor (2020–25): Kai Louis (CDU)

Area
  - Total: 92.21 km^{2} (35.60 sq mi)
- Elevation: 76 m (249 ft)

Population (2025-12-31)
  - Total: 43,116
  - Density: 467.6/km^{2} (1,211/sq mi)
- Time zone: UTC+01:00 (CET)
  - Summer (DST): UTC+02:00 (CEST)
- Postal codes: 52525
- Dialling codes: 02452
- Vehicle registration: HS
- Website: www.heinsberg.de

Heinsberg (German: [ˈhaɪnsbɛʁk]; Limburgish: Hinsberg [ˈɦɪnzˌbæʀ˦(ə)x]) is a town in North Rhine-Westphalia, Germany. It is the seat of the district Heinsberg. It is situated near the border with the Netherlands, on the river Wurm, approx. 20 km north-east of Sittard and 30 km south-west of Mönchengladbach.

== Geography ==
Wassenberg is the town to the north of Heinsberg, Hückelhoven to the east, Waldfeucht and Gangelt to the west, and Geilenkirchen to the south. Two rivers flow through Heinsberg, the Wurm and the Rur. The Wurm flows into the Rur near to Rurkempen, a village of Heinsberg municipality.

== History ==
The first historical mention of the city of Heinsberg as a town occurs in a document issued by Henry I, Lord of Heinsberg in 1255.

Historical affiliations

Lordship of Heinsberg 1085–1484
Duchy of Jülich-Berg 1484–1794, part of:
United Duchies of Jülich-Cleves-Berg 1521–1614
Palatinate-Neuburg 1614–1685
Electoral Palatinate 1685–1794, part of:
Electorate of Bavaria 1777–1794
French Republic 1794–1804
French Empire 1804–1815
Kingdom of Prussia 1815–1871
German Empire 1871–1918
Weimar Republic 1918–1933
Nazi Germany 1933–1945
Allied-occupied Germany 1945–1949
West Germany 1949–1990
Germany 1990–present

== Population ==
Historical population

Year	Pop.	±% p.a.
1965	33,000	—
1970	35,239	+1.32%
1975	36,376	+0.64%
1980	36,439	+0.03%
1985	36,436	−0.00%
1990	37,305	+0.47%
1995	39,852	+1.33%

Year	Pop.	±% p.a.
2000	41,318	+0.73%
2005	41,606	+0.14%
2010	40,760	−0.41%
2015	41,538	+0.38%
2020	42,476	+0.45%
2025	43,116	+0.30%

Source: Landesdatabank Nordrhein-Westfalen

== Economy ==
Due to its proximity to the Benelux countries, sufficient industrial park areas, low trade tax and good traffic connections, Heinsberg has good prerequisites for development. Companies include:

- Enka Gmbh & Co KG
- Hazet (tool company)
- Sera Aquaristic

== Sights ==
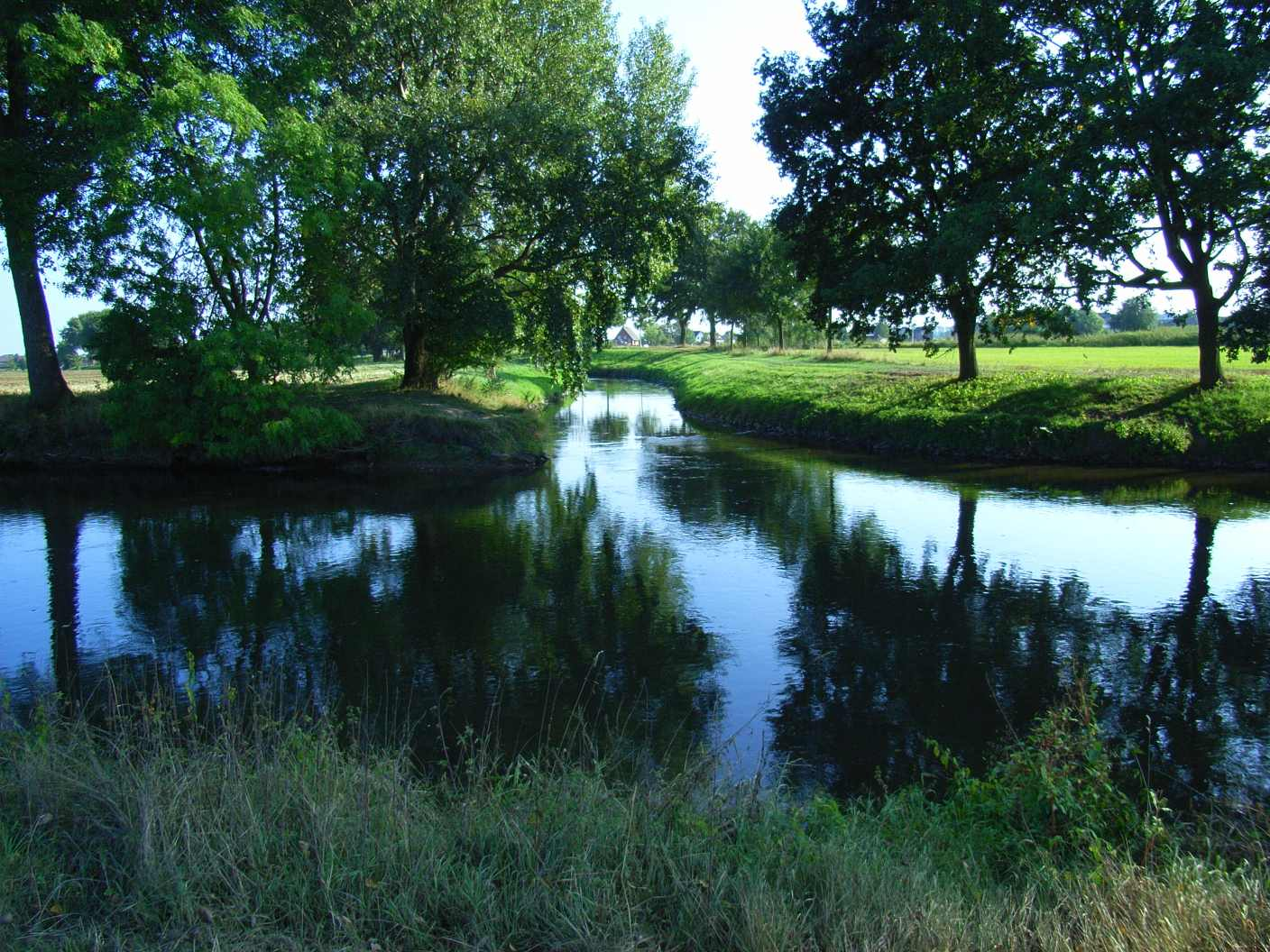
"Rur" and "Wurm" near Heinsberg

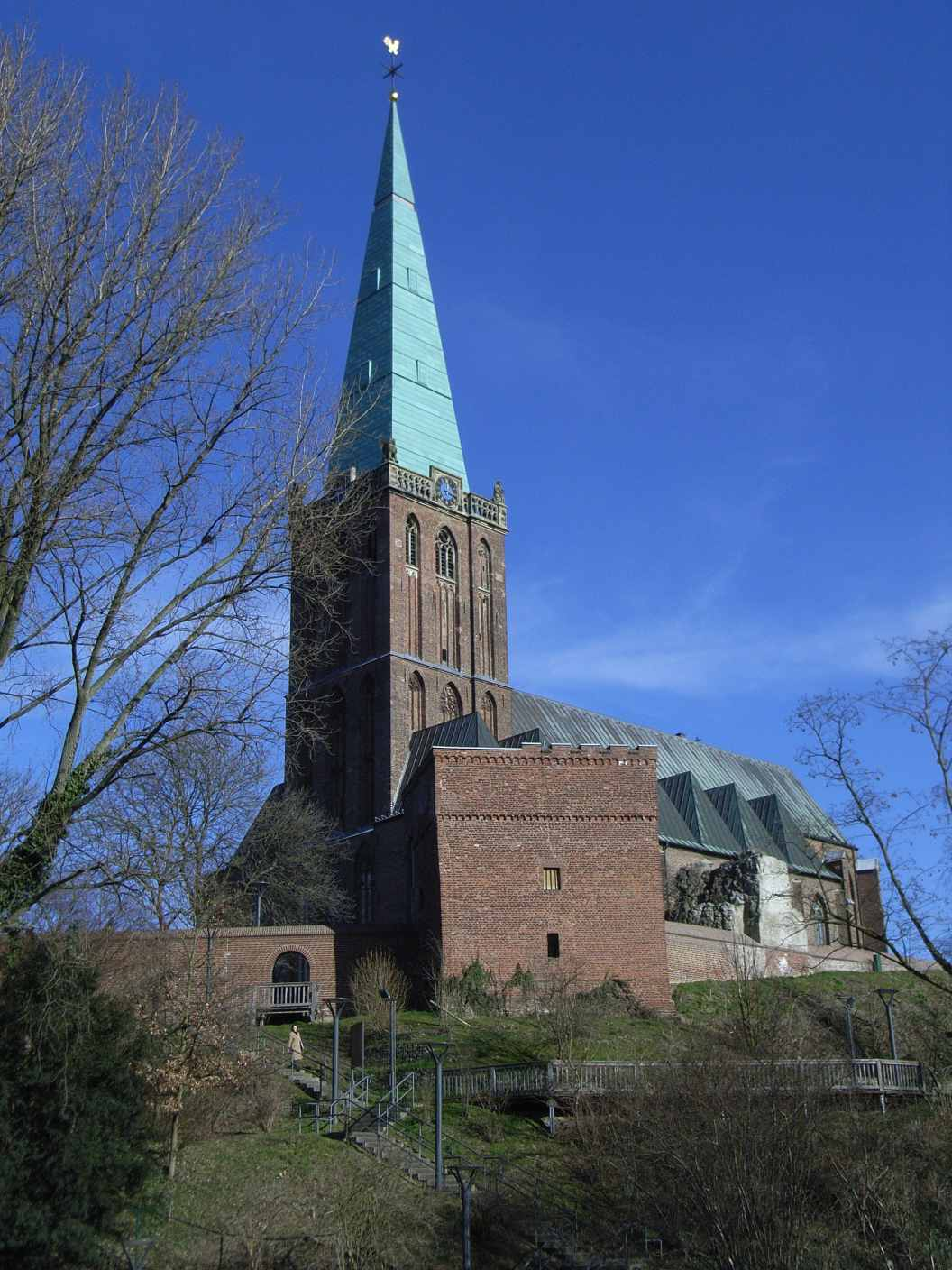
St. Gangolf

The city of Heinsberg has just a few ancient structures. Most of the city was destroyed in 1944 during World War II. The main sights are:

- St. Gangolf church
- Castle ruins
- Old district court
- Building assembly of Propstei, Torbogenhaus (former seat of the Amtmann of the Duchy of Jülich) and the former Haus Lennartz.

== Transport ==
=== Railway ===
The railway from Heinsberg to Lindern, on the Aachen–Mönchengladbach railway, was reopened for passenger traffic in December 2013. Passenger traffic had been suspended in 1980. As of 2015, there is an hourly service from Heinsberg station to Lindern, which continues to Aachen Hbf.

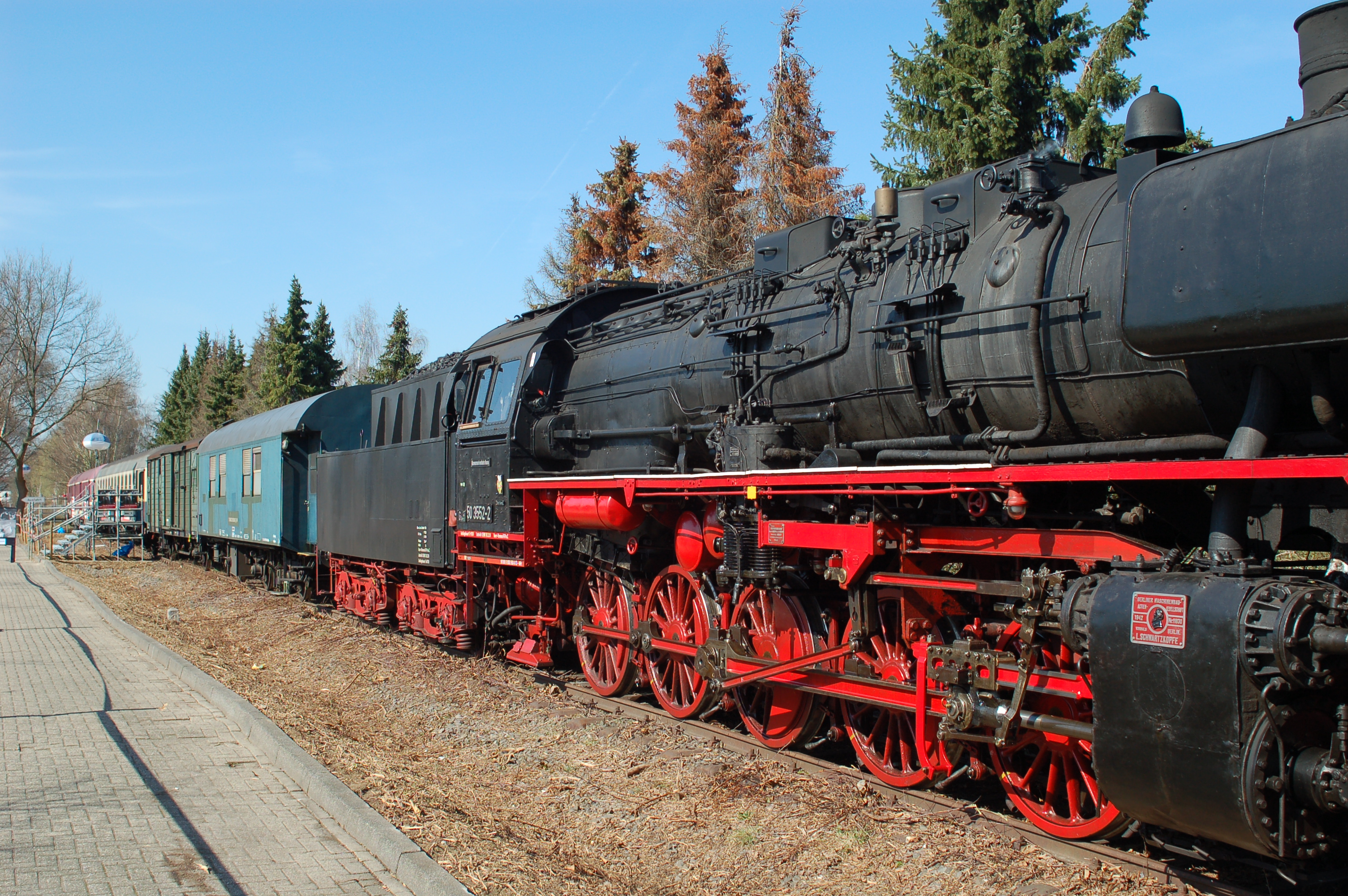
The "Zug der Erinnerung" beside the parking ground of the district administration, today halt Heinsberg Kreishaus (2011)

=== Bus ===
The main bus station of Heinsberg is next to the train station. It is served by buses to several towns and villages in the district, including Erkelenz, Geilenkirchen, Wegberg, Gangelt, Waldfeucht and Selfkant-Tüddern. There is one swift bus, the SB 1 from Erkelenz to Geilenkirchen via Heinsberg.

=== Road ===
Heinsberg has two exits on the motorway A46 to Düsseldorf. The Bundesstraße 221 (Alsdorf–Straelen) passes through the town.

=== Air ===
The nearest airports to the town are Maastricht Aachen Airport, located 42 km (26 mi) south west, Düsseldorf Airport, located 78 km (48 mi) northeast and Cologne Bonn Airport, located 102 km (63 mi) southeast of Heinsburg.

== Public facilities ==
- office of the district Heinsberg
- police (district)
- the district court
- health office
- jail

== Education and training ==
Heinsberg possesses many elementary schools and kindergartens. The secondary education facilities include a high school (Gymnasium). Since 2007 there is a school for disabled persons in the building of the former vocational school (Berufsschule).

== Media ==
- Heinsberger newspaper
- Hs-Woche, a free weekly newspaper
- "Lokalzeit aus Aachen", a news broadcast from the WDR about Aachen and also Heinsberg
- HS TV, a television transmitter
- The radio transmitter Welle West was closed in 2007. Other radio stations, which include 100.5 and 107.8, provide news and weather reports for Heinsberg.

== Heinsberg COVID-19 study ==
Heinsberg was an early centre for the COVID‑19 pandemic and was selected for an intensive study of the disease and its transmission characteristics in late‑March 2020.

== Twin towns – sister cities ==
Heinsberg is twinned with:

- Ozimek, Poland

== See also ==
- Junges Musical Theater Heinsberg KTTH e. V.
