= Linnicher Mühlenteich =

River in Germany

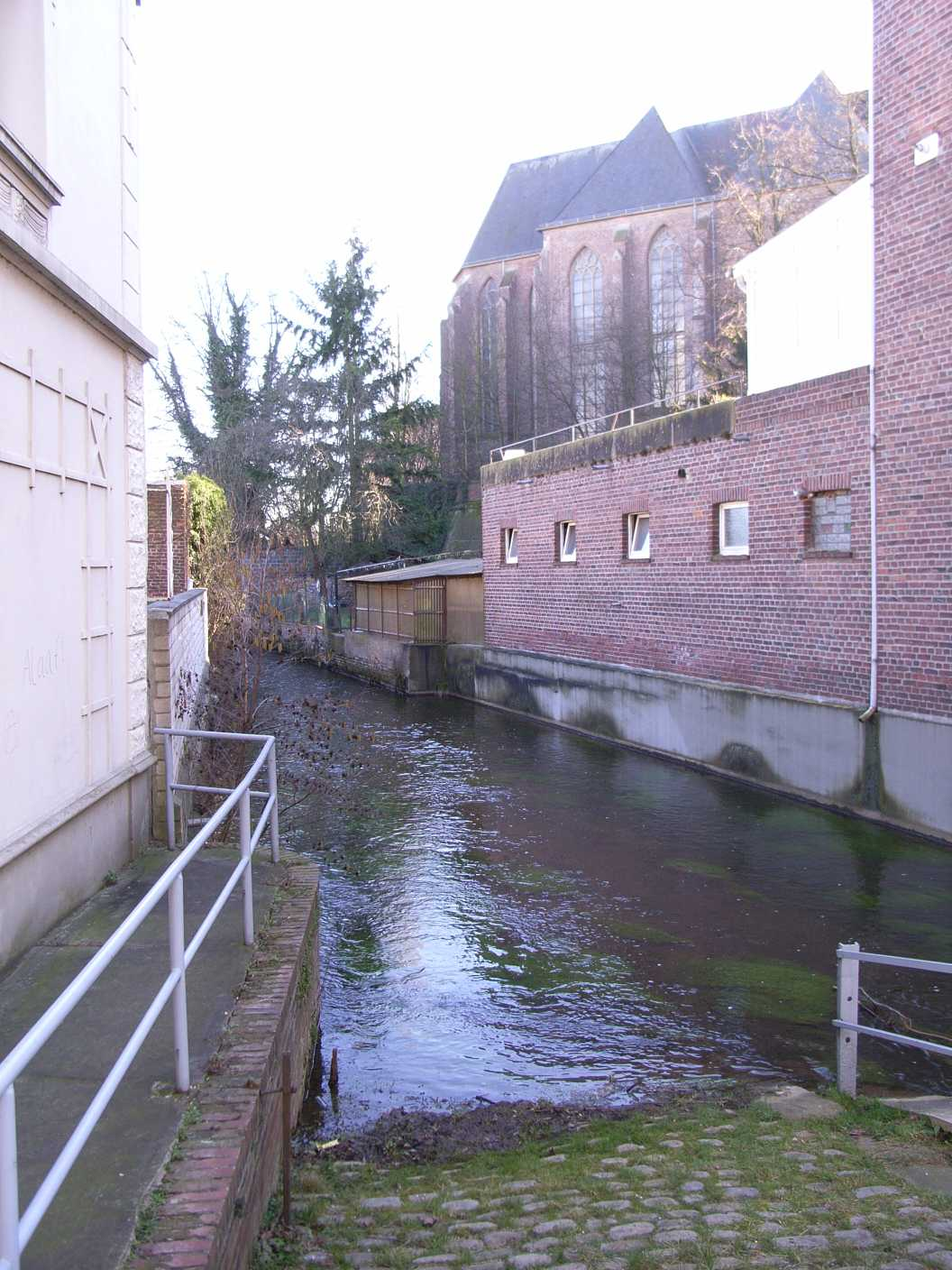

Location
- Country: Germany
- State: North Rhine-Westphalia

Physical characteristics
- Source
  - location: Rur in Linnich
- Mouth
  - location: Rur near Hückelhoven
  - coordinates: 51.0548°N 6.1720°E
- Length: 13.6 km (8.5 mi)

Basin features
- River system: River Rur (Roer River)

Linnicher Mühlenteich (also: Teichbach, in its lower course: Erlenbach) is a stream in North Rhine-Westphalia, western Germany. It is an artificial branch of the River Rur between Linnich and Hückelhoven.

== See also ==
- List of rivers of North Rhine-Westphalia
