= Selfkant =

- Municipality
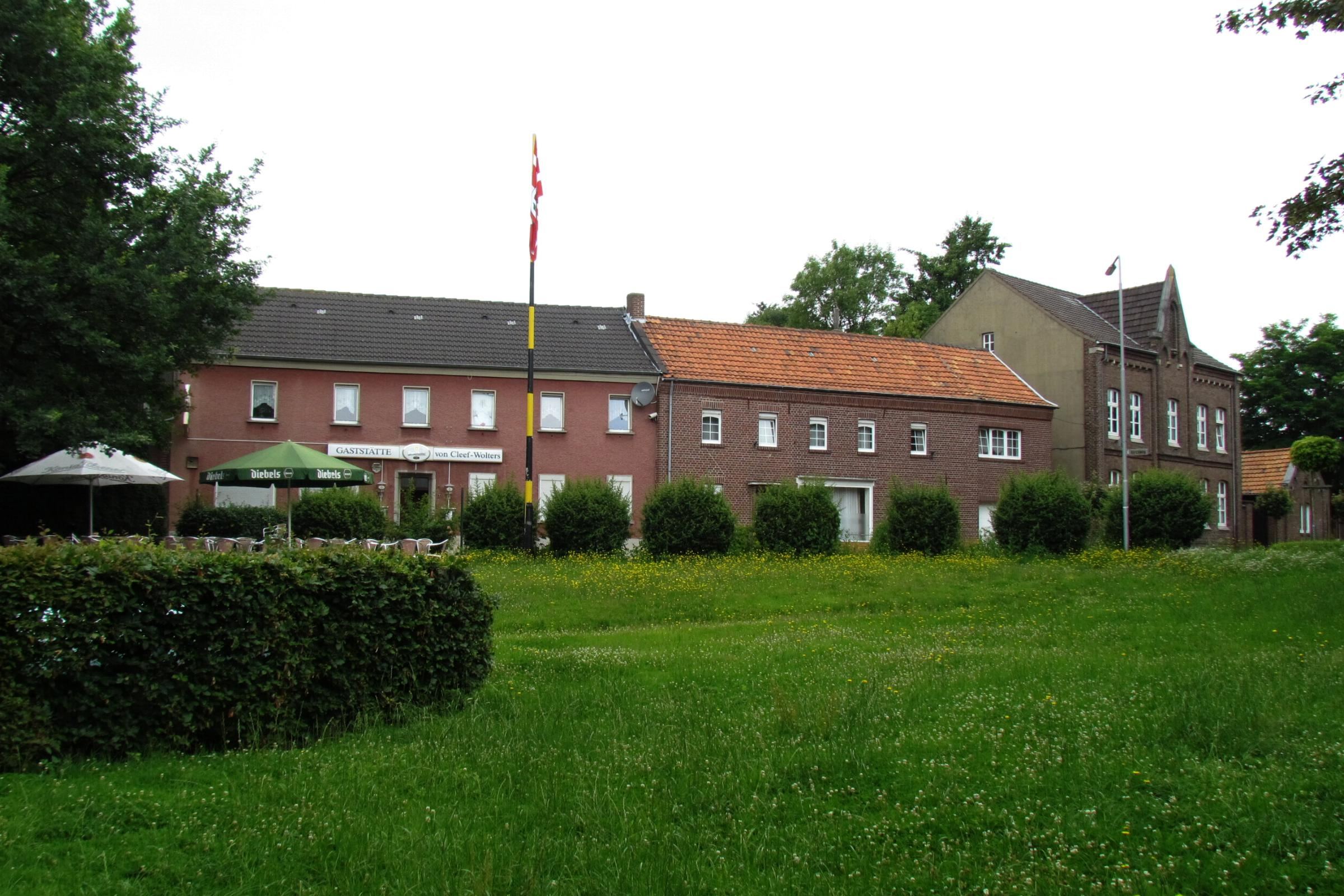

- Flag Coat of arms

- Location of Selfkant within Heinsberg district
- Interactive map of Selfkant
- Location within Germany Location within North Rhine-Westphalia
- Coordinates: 51°1′N 5°55′E
- Country: Germany
- State: North Rhine-Westphalia
- Admin. region: Köln
- District: Heinsberg
- Subdivisions: 16

Government
  - Mayor (2020–25): Norbert Reyans (CDU)

Area
  - Total: 42.09 km^{2} (16.25 sq mi)
- Elevation: 69 m (226 ft)

Population (2025-12-31)
  - Total: 10,771
  - Density: 255.9/km^{2} (662.8/sq mi)
- Time zone: UTC+01:00 (CET)
  - Summer (DST): UTC+02:00 (CEST)
- Postal codes: 52538
- Dialling codes: 02456, 02455 (Saeffelen)
- Vehicle registration: HS
- Website: www.selfkant.de

Selfkant (German: [ˈzɛlfkant]; Dutch: Selfkant or Zelfkant [ˈzɛl(ə)fkɑnt]; Limburgish: Zelfkantj [ˈzæl˦əfˌkɑntʃ˦]) is a municipality in the Heinsberg district, in North Rhine-Westphalia, Germany. It is the most westerly municipality in Germany.

== Geography ==
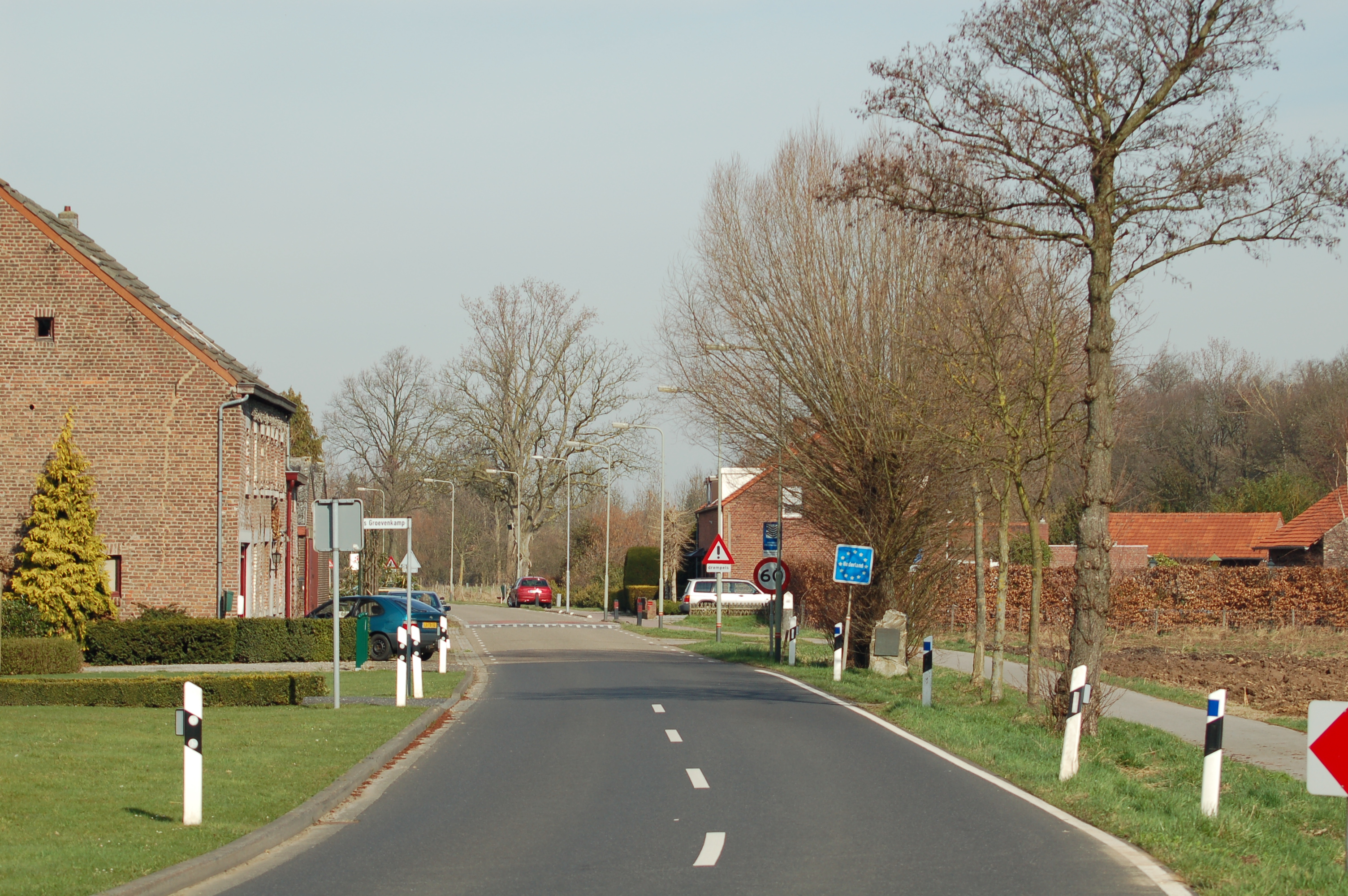
The most western point of Germany is located near this point along the Street from Tüddern (D) to Susteren (NL)

Isenbruch in Selfkant is the most westerly point in Germany since 1919; before that, the position was held by Gravelotte, in Alsace-Lorraine. Selfkant's municipal boundary bordering the Netherlands is 27 kilometres (17 mi) long, but is only 6 kilometres (3.7 mi) long within Germany.

== History ==
The most important domain in Selfkant in the Middle Ages was the castle and village of Millen, the residence of the lords of Millen, which became part of the domain Heinsberg in 1282. In 1499 these were joined by the duke of Jülich and Millen became the seat of an Amtmann. The places Tüddern, Wehr, Süsterseel and Hillensberg belonged to the Amt Born and after 1709 to the Amt Sittard.

From 1794 to 1815 Selfkant was part of the French canton Sittard (department of the Roer). After the Congress of Vienna it became part of the Prussian Rhine province. The border with the Netherlands which was then fixed continued to exist until shortly after the Second World War.

=== Tüddern ===
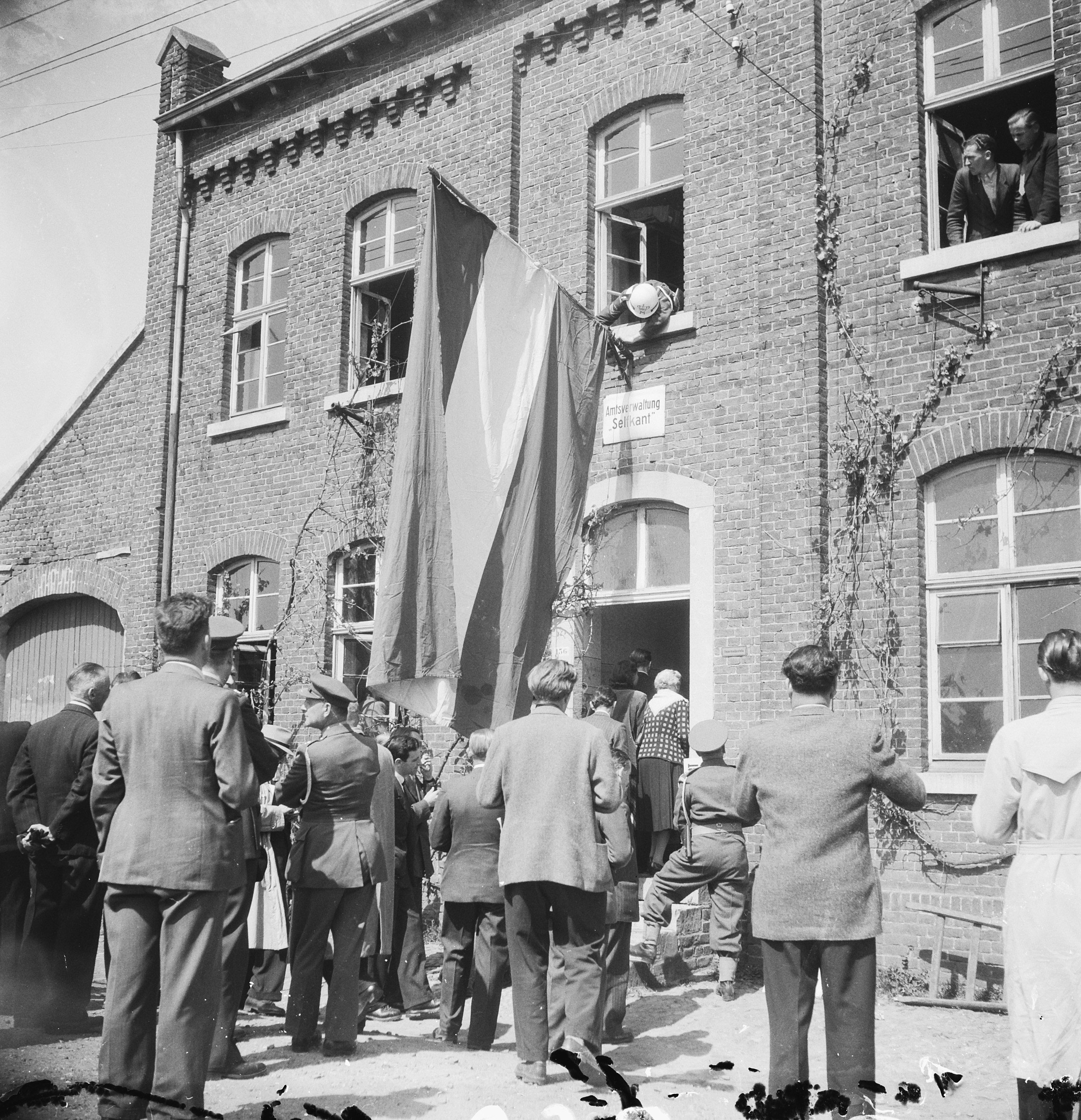
Hanging of Dutch flag in Selfkant, 1949

After the Second World War, on 23 April 1949, the Netherlands annexed Selfkant as part of war reparations, and its inhabitants were given a Dutch passport with the special indication "to be treated as a Dutchman". The Dutch government appointed a country landdrost to head the governing board of the Tüddern 'office', as the Selfkant was renamed for administrative purposes. The governing board appointed by the Germans was sent home because it was contrary to the Dutch constitution. However, as a transitional measure for ex-German territories, the German governing board retained an advisory role.

At that time much was invested in such things as houses and roads. Parts of the area became Dutchified, and the Dutch influence is still present.

In the Dutch period, the N274 road was built to provide a direct link between Roermond and Heerlen. Even after 1963 the road remained a narrow strip or corridor of Dutch territory with no junctions with German roads, and no passport was needed to use it. On 25 February 2002 the road was returned to Germany and in the course of 2004 connections were made with several roads, among others with the B56 between Gangelt and Süsterseel.

=== German municipality ===
In March 1957 official negotiations started between the Netherlands and West Germany concerning the return of the area, and on 1 August 1963 the area was returned to Germany in exchange for a payment of 280 million German Marks. From the existing 'office' of Tüddern the old municipalities of Havert, Hillensberg, Höngen, Millen, Süsterseel, Tüddern and Wehr were formed. Two months later, on 21 October 1963, the first municipal council elections under German authority were held.

The seven municipalities, with the municipality of Saeffelen from the Amt Waldfeucht, were added to the municipality Selfkant on 1 July 1969.

With 233 inhabitants per km^{2} Selfkant is considered a rural municipality. Because of the favourable price of land the municipality is nowadays very much in demand with young families. A lot of Dutch cross the border to build their own houses there. Roughly one quarter to one half of the inhabitants are Dutch. At the mayoral election of 2003 a Dutch inhabitant put himself forward as candidate.

Many residents are also stationed, work, or are family members of employees at the NATO Air Base in Geilenkirchen. Tüddern alone has over 30 American families with the Gem. Selfkant having dozens more. Many Canadians at the NATO base also live in Selfkant. English is quite prominent as a third language to Dutch and German in the whole area.

== Population ==
Historical population

| Year | Pop. | ±% p.a. |
|---|---|---|
| 1965 | 7,707 | — |
| 1970 | 8,022 | +0.80% |
| 1975 | 8,100 | +0.19% |
| 1980 | 8,158 | +0.14% |
| 1985 | 8,268 | +0.27% |
| 1990 | 8,598 | +0.79% |
| 1995 | 8,980 | +0.87% |

| Year | Pop. | ±% p.a. |
|---|---|---|
| 2000 | 9,511 | +1.16% |
| 2005 | 10,154 | +1.32% |
| 2010 | 10,245 | +0.18% |
| 2015 | 10,167 | −0.15% |
| 2020 | 10,253 | +0.17% |
| 2025 | 10,771 | +0.99% |

Source: Landesdatabank Nordrhein-Westfalen

== Gallery ==
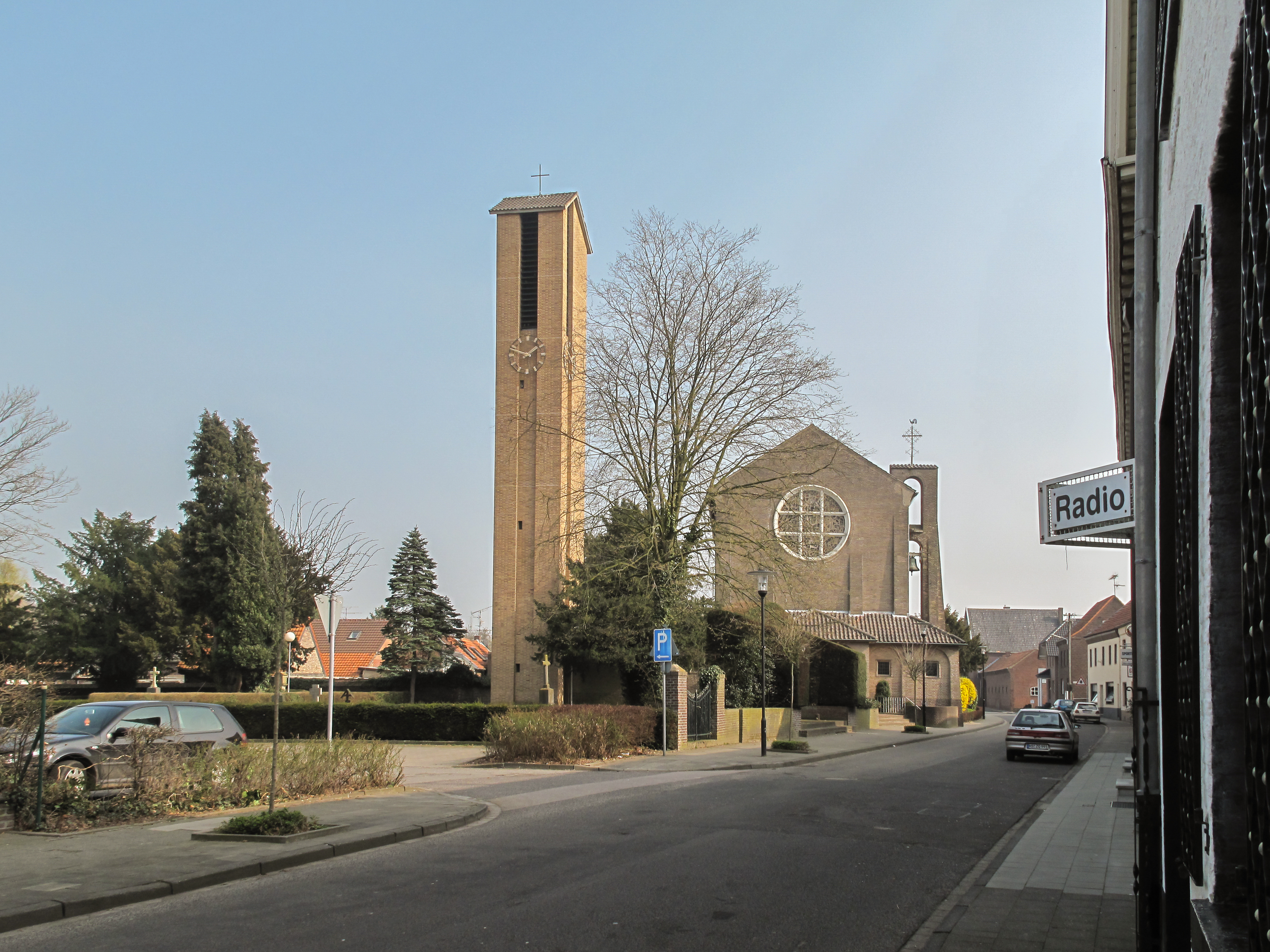
Höngen, chapel (Sankt Lambertuskapelle) in the street

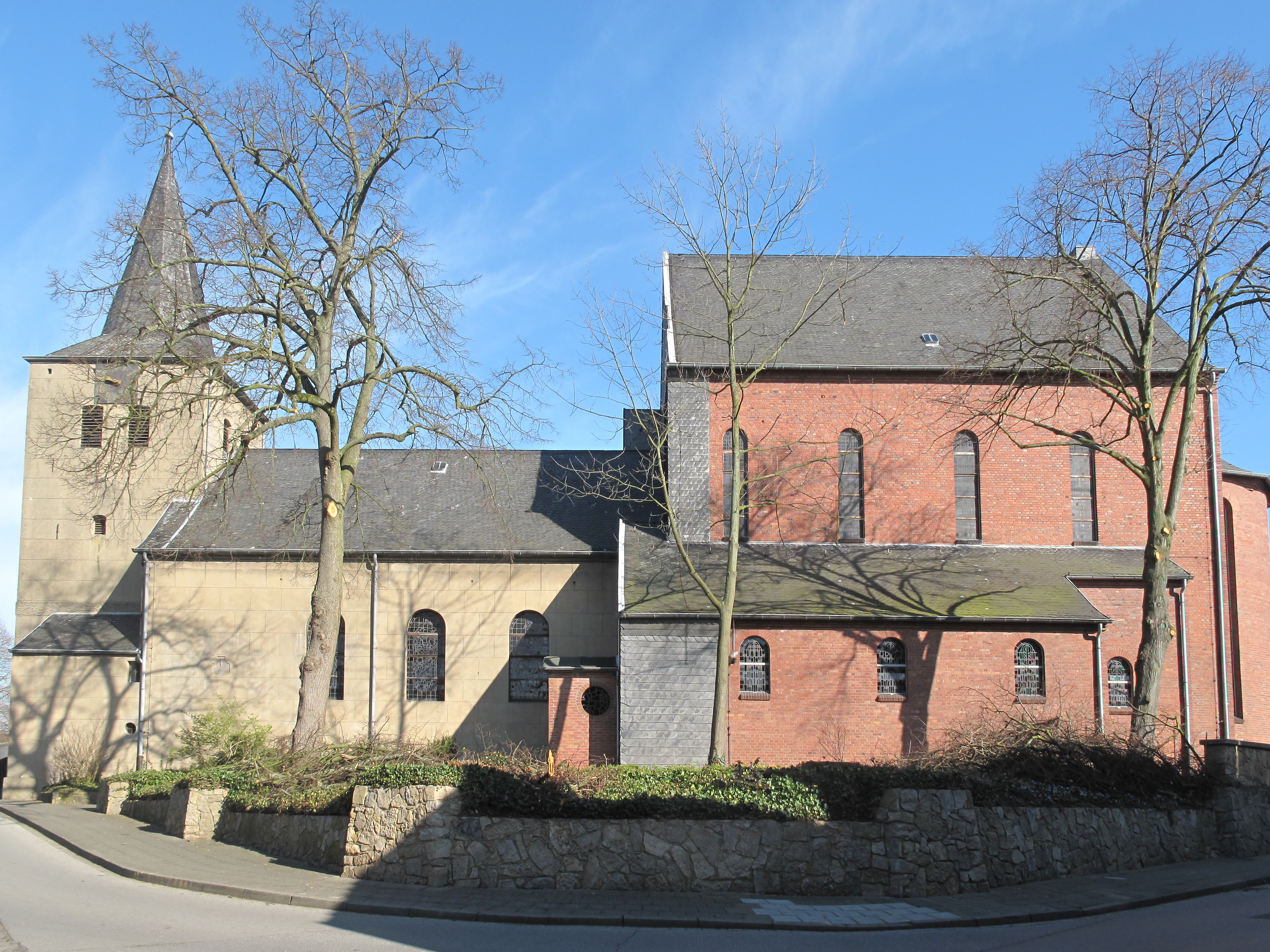
Tüddern, church

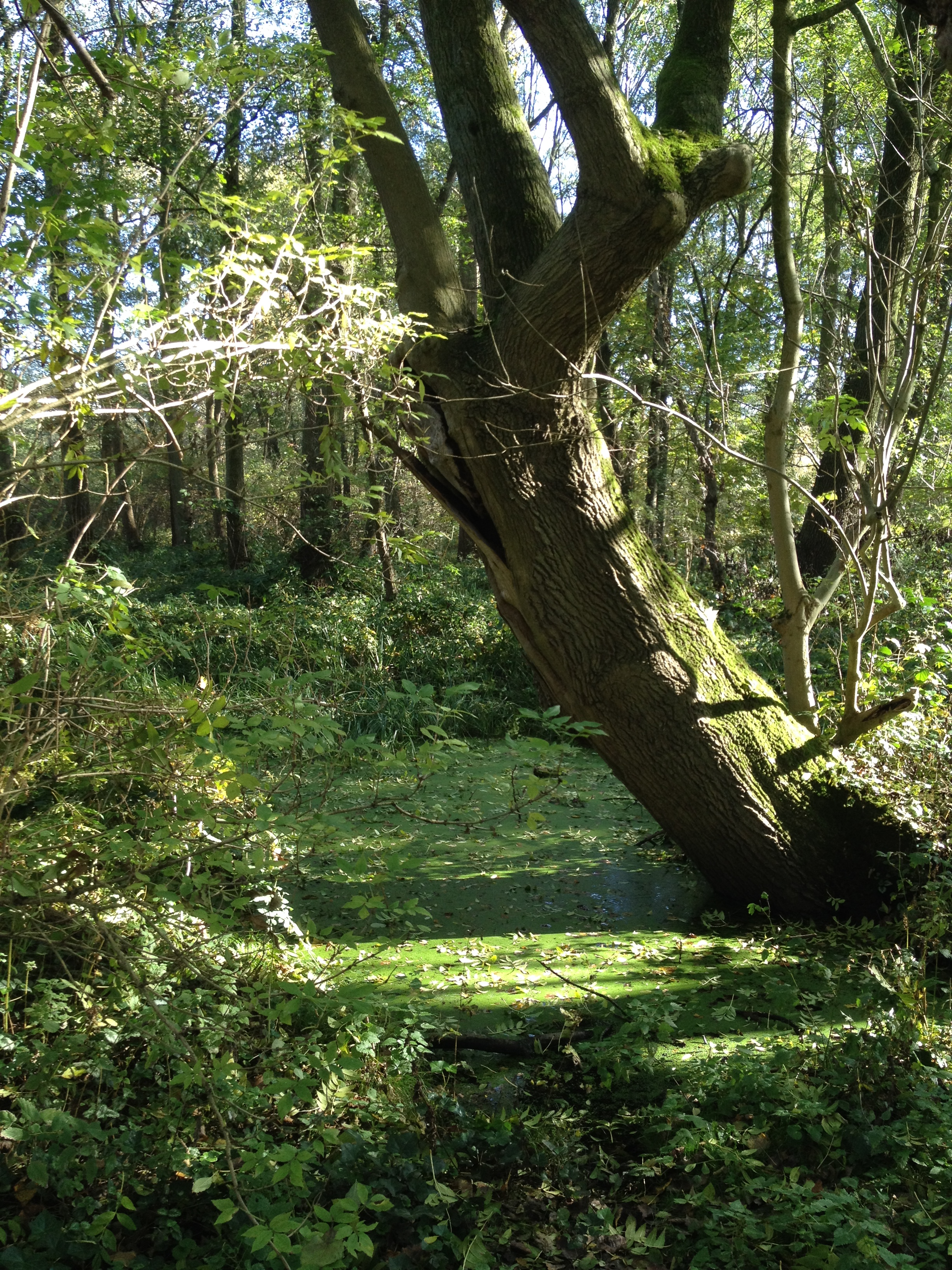
Tuedderner Venn
