= Wilfried Oellers =

German politician

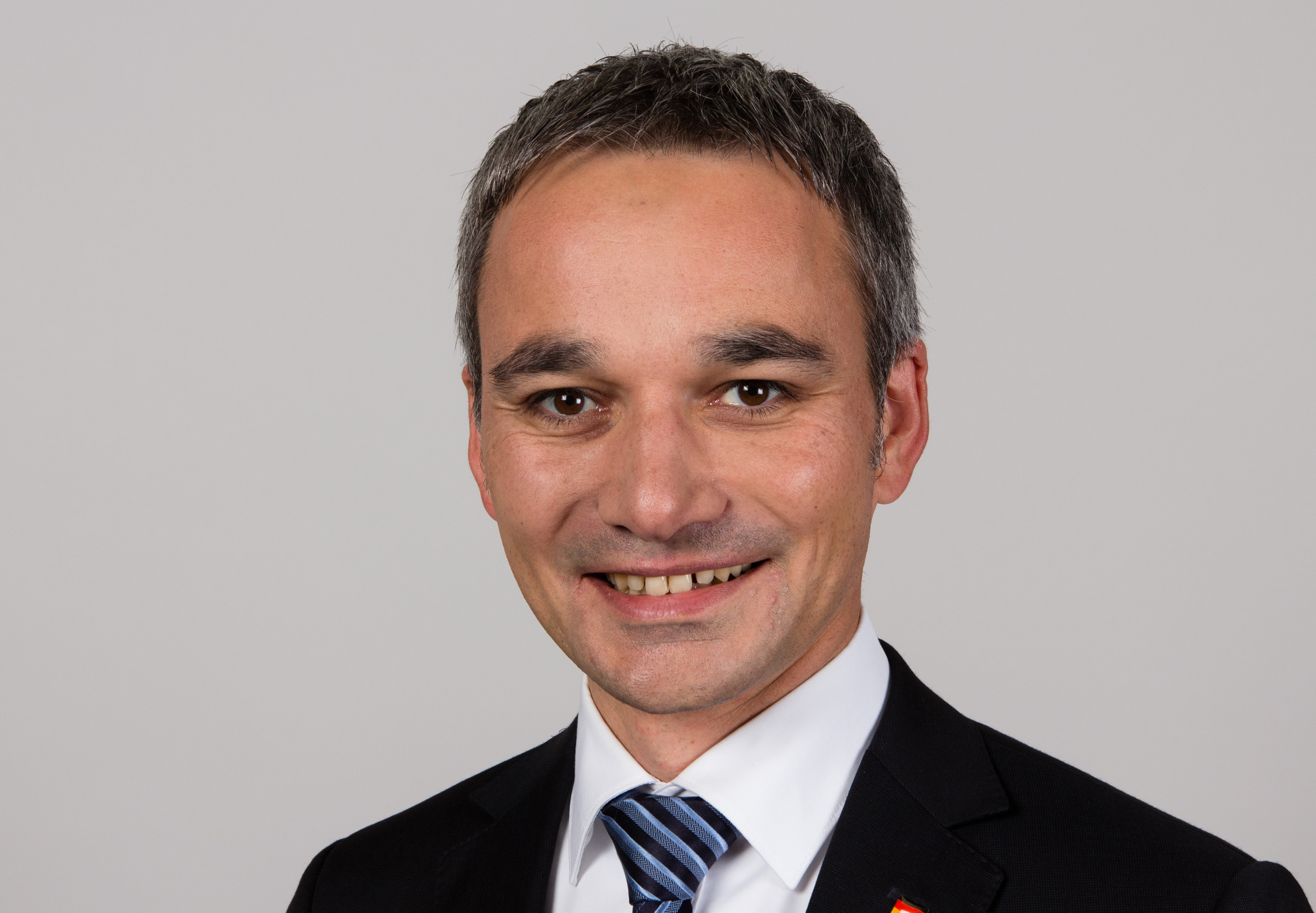
- Wilfried Oellers in 2014

Member of the Bundestag
- Incumbent
- Assumed office 2013
- Preceded by: Leo Dautzenberg

Personal details
- Born: 16 September 1975 (age 51) Mönchengladbach, West Germany (now Germany)
- Party: CDU
- Education: University of Cologne

Wilfried Oellers (born 16 September 1975) is a German lawyer and politician of the Christian Democratic Union (CDU) who has been serving as a member of the Bundestag from the state of North Rhine-Westphalia since 2013.

== Political career ==
Oellers became a member of the Bundestag in the 2013 German federal election, representing the Heinsberg district. In parliament, he is a member of the Committee on Labour and Social Affairs.

== Other activities ==
- Bundesarbeitsgemeinschaft Inklusionsfirmen (BAG IF), Member of the Advisory Board
