= Wassenberg =

- Town
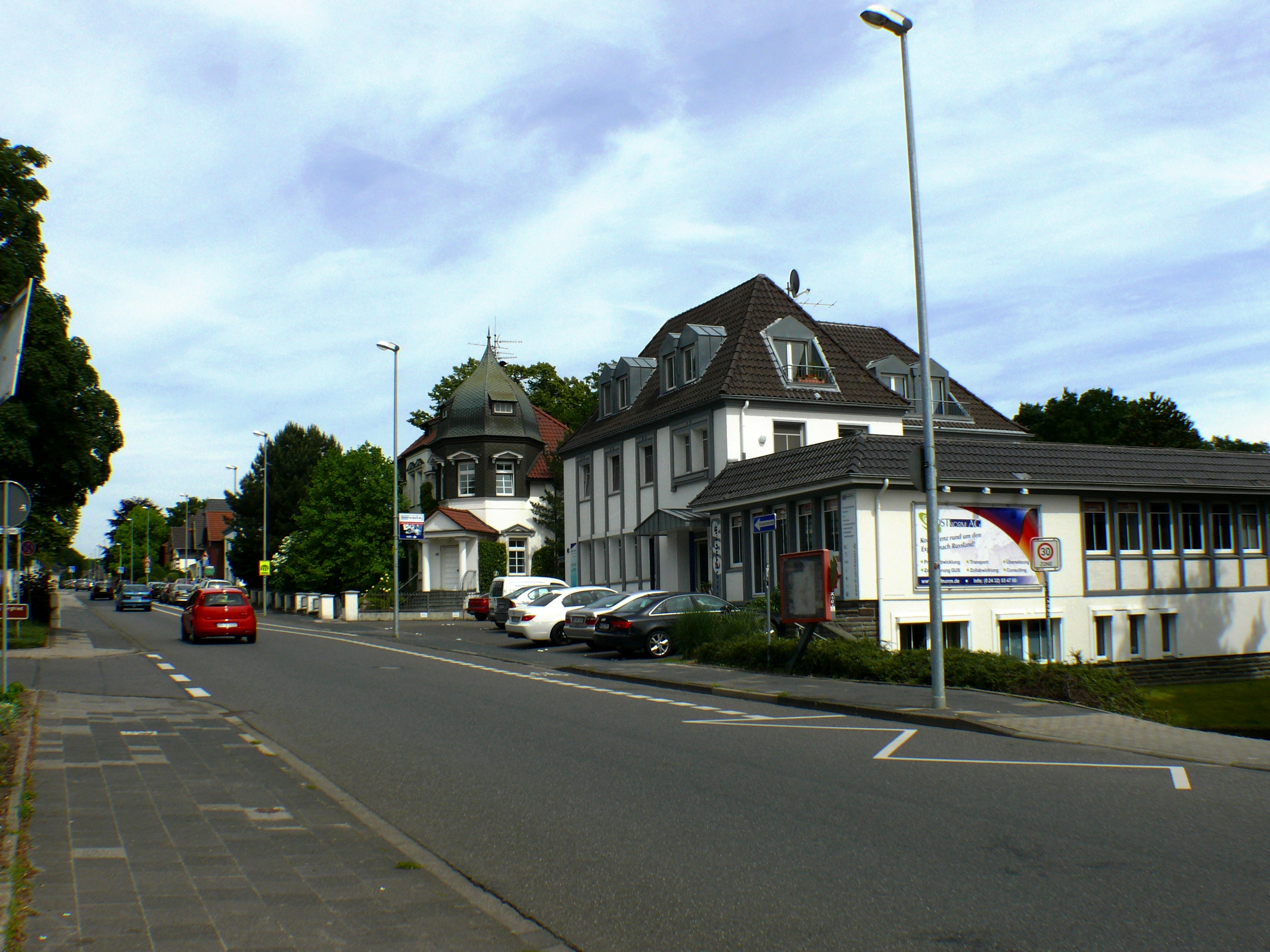

- Flag Coat of arms

- Location of Wassenberg within Heinsberg district
- Interactive map of Wassenberg
- Location within Germany Location within North Rhine-Westphalia
- Coordinates: 51°06′N 06°09′E
- Country: Germany
- State: North Rhine-Westphalia
- Admin. region: Köln
- District: Heinsberg
- Subdivisions: 6

Government
  - Mayor (2020–25): Marcel Maurer (CDU)

Area
  - Total: 42.43 km^{2} (16.38 sq mi)
- Elevation: 30–92 m (98–302 ft)

Population (2025-12-31)
  - Total: 19,687
  - Density: 464.0/km^{2} (1,202/sq mi)
- Time zone: UTC+01:00 (CET)
  - Summer (DST): UTC+02:00 (CEST)
- Postal codes: 41849
- Dialling codes: 02432
- Vehicle registration: HS
- Website: www.wassenberg.de

Wassenberg (German pronunciation: [ˈvasn̩bɛʁk]; Limburgish: Wasseberg [ˈwɑsəˌbæʀ˦(ə)x]) is a town in the district Heinsberg, in North Rhine-Westphalia, Germany. It is situated near the border with the Netherlands, on the river Rur, approx. 6 km north-east of Heinsberg and 15 km south-east of Roermond.

== History ==
The hill castle of Wassenberg dates from before 1020, when it was given to Gerard, from then on Count of Wassenberg, by Emperor Henry II. The four-story square keep dates from the first half of the 15th century, and was restored between 2013 and 2016. At the end of the 11th century, Count Gerard III of Wassenberg became Count of Guelders. His descendants were Counts, later Dukes of Guelders until 1371.

== Population ==
Historical population

Year	Pop.	±% p.a.
1965	11,660	—
1970	12,137	+0.81%
1975	12,521	+0.62%
1980	12,985	+0.73%
1985	12,781	−0.32%
1990	12,478	−0.48%
1995	14,280	+2.73%

Year	Pop.	±% p.a.
2000	15,815	+2.06%
2005	16,841	+1.27%
2010	17,297	+0.54%
2015	17,898	+0.69%
2020	18,830	+1.02%
2025	19,687	+0.89%

Source: Landesdatabank Nordrhein-Westfalen
