= Motte Aldeberg =

Motte in Germany

Coordinates: 51.1466°N 6.1957°E

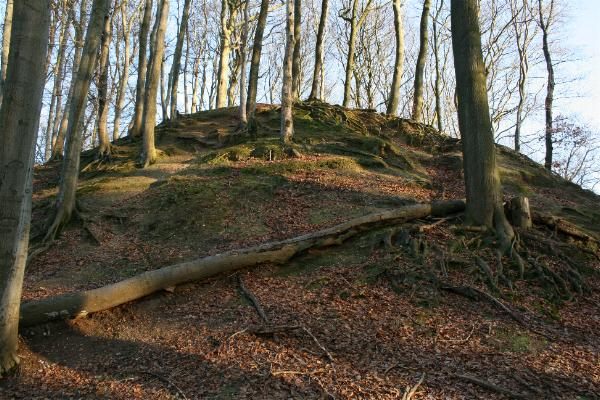
The Motte Aldeberg

Motte Aldeberg is a motte in Germany. Often called only Alde Berg, it is located in the Helpensteiner Bachtal between the communities of Arsbeck and Rödgen in the town of Wegberg in the Heinsberg district in North Rhine-Westphalia.
