= Adolf Spies von Büllesheim =

Member of the German Bundestag

Adolf Freiherr Spies von Büllesheim (June 4, 1929 – February 12, 2011) was a German politician, farmer and lawyer.

== Life ==
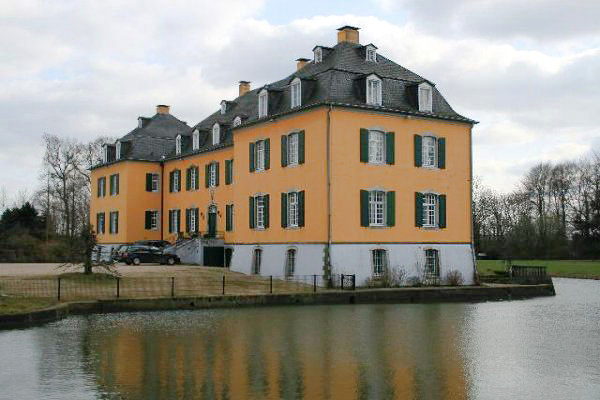
Haus Hall, Ratheim

Adolf Spies von Büllesheim was born in Haus Hall in Ratheim, district of Heinsberg, in North Rhine-Westphalia, property of the baronial Spies von Büllesheim family since the 18th century. He was the son of Egon Franz Freiherr Spies von Büllesheim and his wife Maria (born Freiin von Oer).

After school in Erkelenz he studied German law and farming at universities in Cologne and in Bonn. After university he worked as a farmer and a lawyer from 1960 to 1997.

Since 1952 Spies von Büllesheim was a member of the CDU political party. From 1969 to 1972 he was mayor of Hückelhoven. From 1972 to 1987 Spies von Büllesheim was member of the German Bundestag for Heinsberg.

He died in 2011 in Neuhall, Ratheim.

== Personal life ==
Spies von Büllesheim was married to Gräfin Maria Immaculata (born Concha) von Mirbach-Harff, Freiin von Vittinghoff (1938–2002), and together they had six children.

== Awards ==
- 1979: Order of Merit of the Federal Republic of Germany
