= Geilenkirchen =

- Town
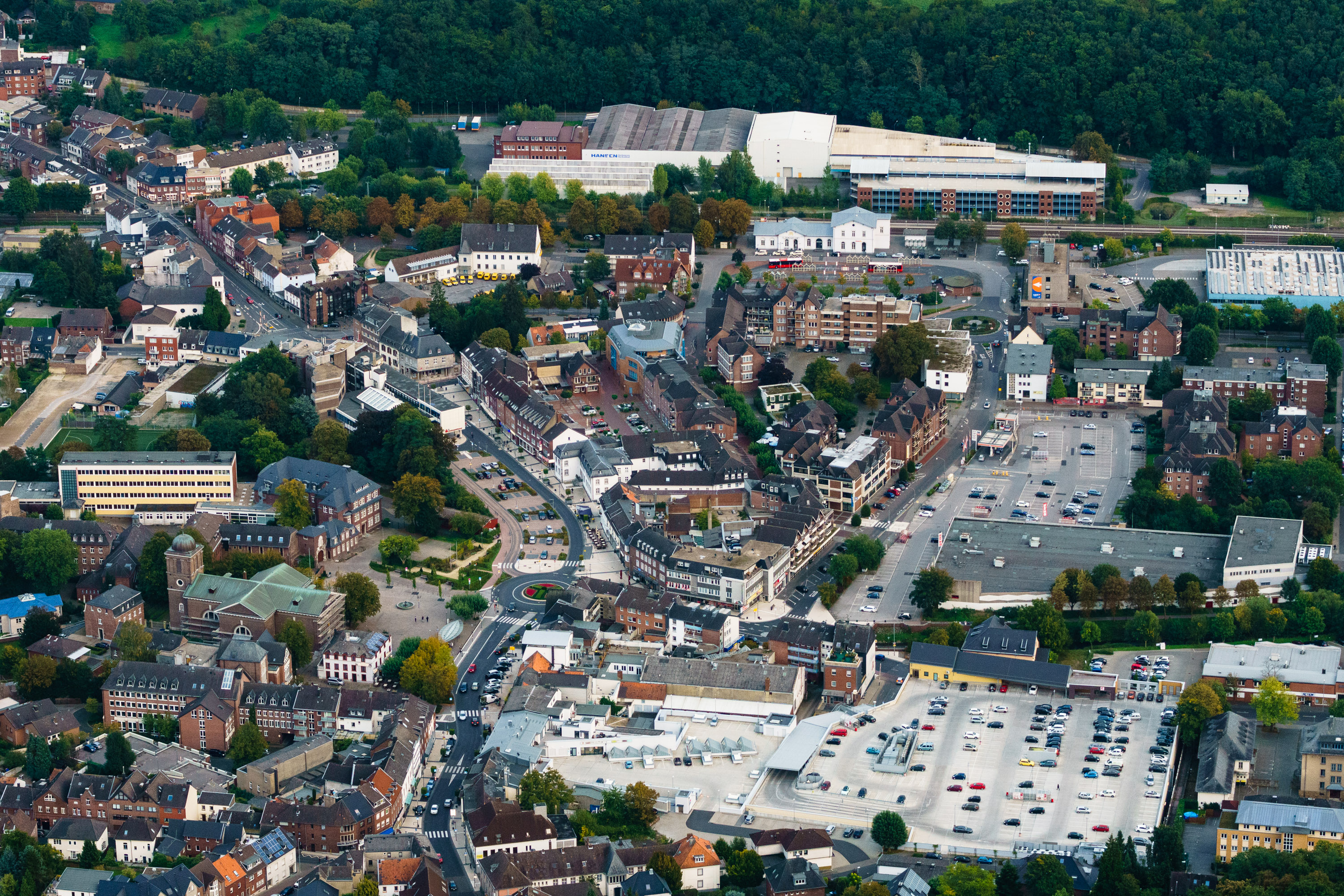
- Aerial view

- Coat of arms

- Location of Geilenkirchen within Heinsberg district
- Interactive map of Geilenkirchen
- Location within Germany Location within North Rhine-Westphalia
- Coordinates: 50°57′55″N 6°07′10″E
- Country: Germany
- State: North Rhine-Westphalia
- Admin. region: Köln
- District: Heinsberg
- Subdivisions: 13

Government
  - Mayor (2025–30): Armin Leon (CDU)

Area
  - Total: 83.16 km^{2} (32.11 sq mi)
- Elevation: 95 m (312 ft)

Population (2025-12-31)
  - Total: 28,605
  - Density: 344.0/km^{2} (890.9/sq mi)
- Time zone: UTC+01:00 (CET)
  - Summer (DST): UTC+02:00 (CEST)
- Postal codes: 52511
- Dialling codes: 02451; 02453; 02462
- Vehicle registration: HS, ERK, GK
- Website: www.geilenkirchen.de

Geilenkirchen (German pronunciation: [ˈɡaɪlənkɪʁçn̩], Limburgish: Jellekerke [ˈjæləˌkæʀ˦(ə)kə]) is a town in the district Heinsberg, in North Rhine-Westphalia, Germany. It is situated near the border with the Netherlands, on the river Wurm, approx. 15 km (9.3 mi) north-east of Heerlen and 20 km (12.4 mi) north of Aachen.

It was the site of Operation Clipper in November 1944.

The town gives its name to nearby NATO Air Base Geilenkirchen. The base is home to seventeen E-3A airborne early warning and control aircraft flown by aircrew from over fourteen nations.

On 24 July 2019 the highest temperature ever recorded in Germany was measured in Geilenkirchen at 40.5 °C (104.9 °F) during a heat wave that affected much of Europe. The record was broken the following day when temperature in Lingen reached 42.6 °C (108.7 °F).

== Population ==
Historical population

Year	Pop.	±% p.a.
1965	17,542	—
1970	19,101	+1.72%
1975	20,708	+1.63%
1980	21,834	+1.06%
1985	22,220	+0.35%
1990	22,808	+0.52%
1995	26,549	+3.08%

Year	Pop.	±% p.a.
2000	27,826	+0.94%
2005	28,468	+0.46%
2010	28,253	−0.15%
2015	26,963	−0.93%
2020	27,518	+0.41%
2025	28,605	+0.78%

Source: Landesdatabank Nordrhein-Westfalen

== Born in Geilenkirchen ==
- Marlon Bröhr (born 1974), CDU politician
- Ludolf Camphausen (1803–1890), banker, Prussian minister president in the revolutionary year 1848
- Otto von Camphausen (1812–1896), Prussian Finance Minister
- Christoph Dohmen (born 1957), professor of the Old Testament at the University of Regensburg
- Hans Meyer (1900–1962), German physician and ministerial official
- Max Wilms (1867–1918), German physician and surgeon
