= Ratheim =

Coordinates: 51.0675°N 6.1772°E

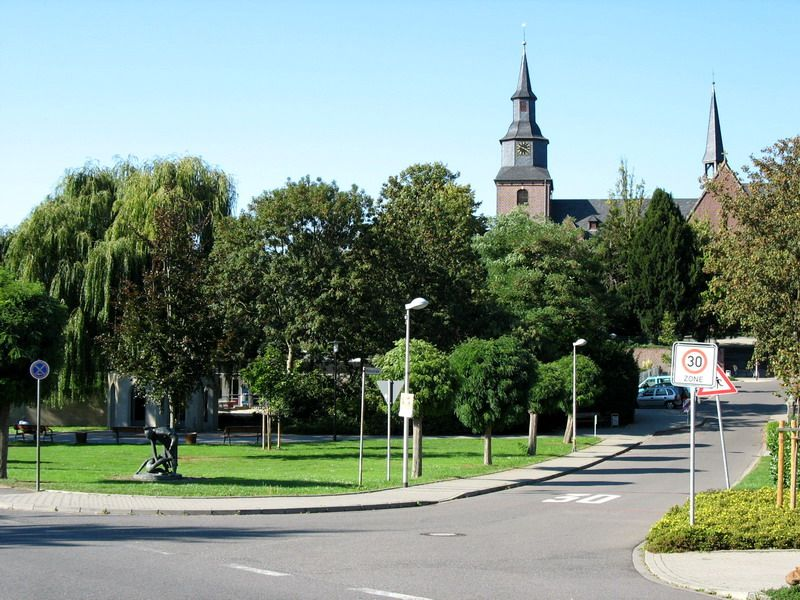
Center of Ratheim

Ratheim is the second largest district of Hückelhoven, Germany.

== People ==
- Adolf Freiherr Spies von Büllesheim (1929-2011), German politician, farmer and lawyer
