= Gangelt =

Municipality in Heinsberg district in North Rhine-Westphalia, Germany

- Municipality
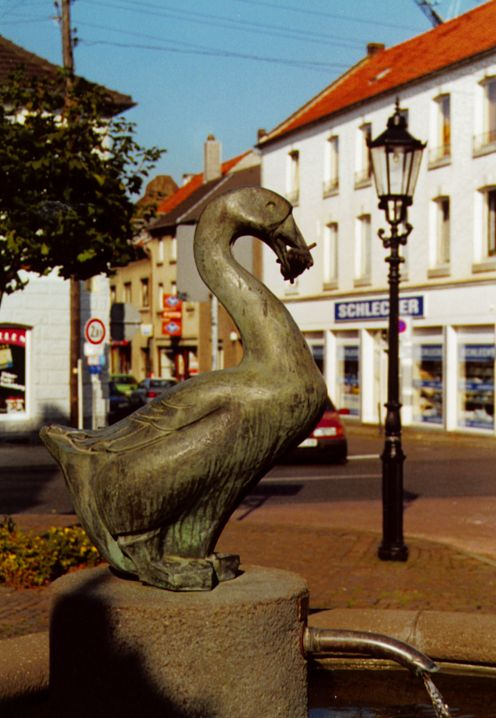

- Coat of arms

- Location of Gangelt within Heinsberg district
- Interactive map of Gangelt
- Location within Germany Location within North Rhine-Westphalia
- Coordinates: 50°58′59″N 06°00′00″E
- Country: Germany
- State: North Rhine-Westphalia
- Admin. region: Köln
- District: Heinsberg
- Subdivisions: 17

Government
  - Mayor (2020–25): Guido Willems (CDU)

Area
  - Total: 48.72 km^{2} (18.81 sq mi)
- Elevation: 60 m (200 ft)

Population (2025-12-31)
  - Total: 13,561
  - Density: 278.3/km^{2} (720.9/sq mi)
- Time zone: UTC+01:00 (CET)
  - Summer (DST): UTC+02:00 (CEST)
- Postal codes: 52538
- Dialling codes: 02454
- Vehicle registration: HS
- Website: www.gangelt.de

Gangelt (German pronunciation: [ˈɡaŋl̩t]) is a municipality in the district of Heinsberg, in North Rhine-Westphalia, Germany. It is on the border with the Netherlands and about 10 km east of Sittard and 10 km south-west of Heinsberg.

Its most well-known resident was cartographer Gerard Kremer, better known as Gerardus Mercator, who lived the first five or six years of his life there.

== Geography ==
=== Local subdivisions ===
- Gangelt with 2,521 inhabitants
- Birgden with 2,977 inhabitants
- Breberen with 828 inhabitants
- Broichhoven with 168 inhabitants
- Brüxgen with 513 inhabitants
- Buscherheide with 132 inhabitants
- Harzelt with 201 inhabitants
- Hastenrath with 536 inhabitants
- Hohenbusch with 45 inhabitants
- Kievelberg with 32 inhabitants
- Kreuzrath with 504 inhabitants
- Langbroich with 807 inhabitants
- Mindergangelt with 244 inhabitants
- Nachbarheid with 120 inhabitants
- Niederbusch with 601 inhabitants
- Schierwaldenrath with 596 inhabitants
- Schümm with 93 inhabitants
- Stahe with 1,029 inhabitants
- Vinteln with 42 inhabitants

(21.02.2007)

== History ==
Gangelt was first mentioned in a document in 828 as a King's property.

In February 2020, a carnival celebration caused a massive COVID-19 outbreak. In April 2020, one in seven residents was seropositive, in a sample of 500.

== Population ==
Historical population

Year	Pop.	±% p.a.
1965	9,144	—
1970	9,186	+0.09%
1975	9,263	+0.17%
1980	9,323	+0.13%
1985	9,493	+0.36%
1990	9,844	+0.73%
1995	10,367	+1.04%

Year	Pop.	±% p.a.
2000	11,088	+1.35%
2005	11,582	+0.88%
2010	11,634	+0.09%
2015	12,015	+0.65%
2020	12,733	+1.17%
2025	13,561	+1.27%

Source: Landesdatabank Nordrhein-Westfalen

== Town twinning ==
- Sohland an der Spree, Germany, since 1991
- Kruibeke, Belgium, since 1998
- Onderbanken, Netherlands, since 1975

== Local people ==
- Gerardus Mercator, cartographer born 1512
- Karl-Josef Kutsch (born 1924), German physician and co-author of Großes Sängerlexikon
