= NATO Air Base Geilenkirchen =

Main Operating Base of NATO E-3 Sentry aircraft

NATO Air Base Geilenkirchen
- Geilenkirchen, North Rhine-Westphalia in Germany
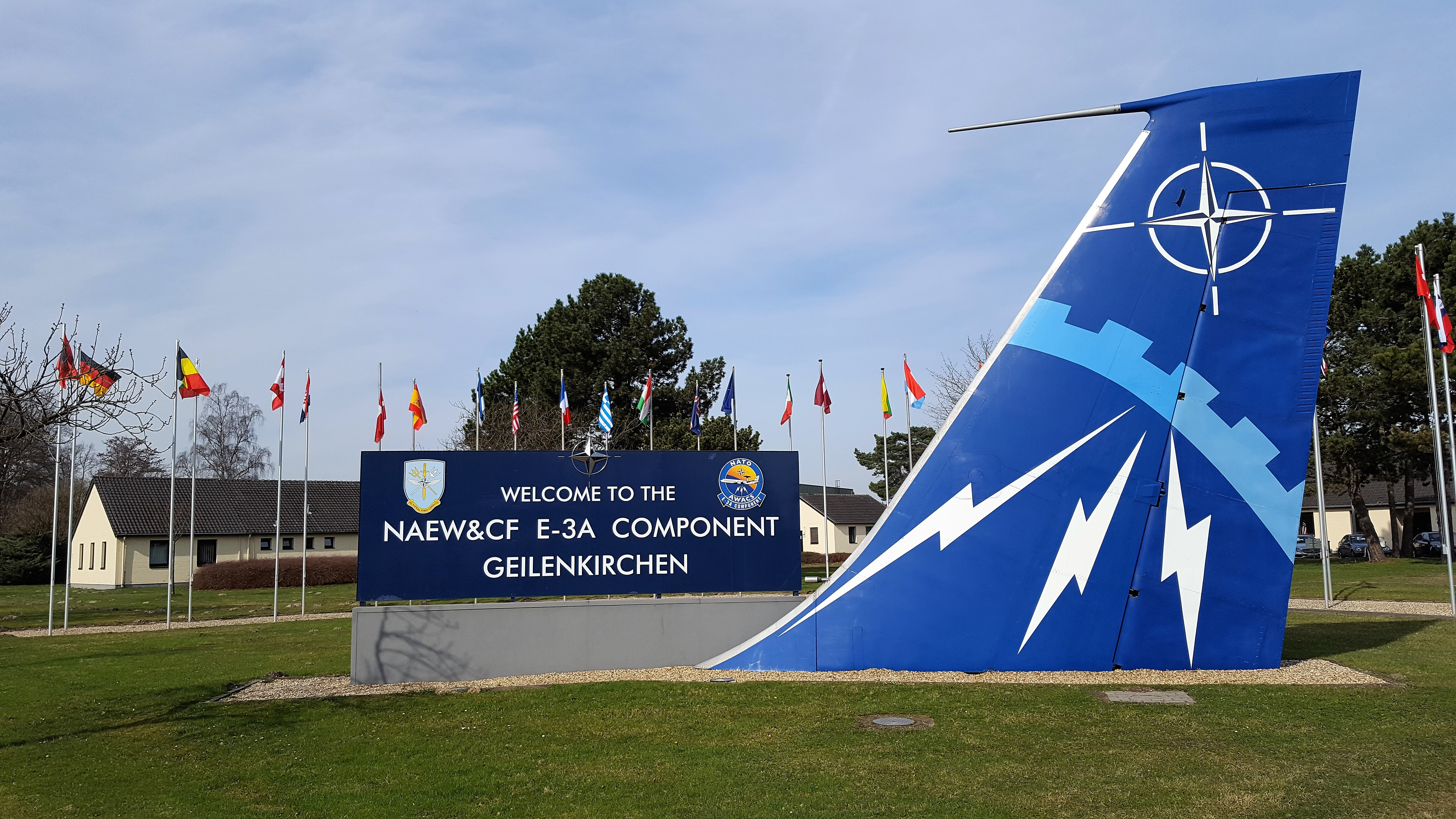
- The entrance to NATO Air Base Geilenkirchen

Site information
- Type: Military airfield
- Operator: NATO
- Controlled by: Supreme Allied Commander Europe (SACEUR)
- Condition: Operational
- Website: Official website

Location
- Location within Germany
- Coordinates: 50°57′39″N 006°02′33″E

Site history
- Built: 1953
- In use: 1953 – present

Garrison information
- Garrison: NATO Airborne Early Warning and Control Force – E-3A Component

Airfield information
- Identifiers: IATA: GKE, ICAO: ETNG, WMO: 10500
- Elevation: 89 metres (292 ft) AMSL
Runways
Direction	Length and surface
09/27	3,050 metres (10,007 ft) Concrete/Asphalt

NATO Air Base Geilenkirchen (E-3A Component) (IATA: GKE, ICAO: ETNG) is located near Geilenkirchen, North Rhine-Westphalia, Germany. It is the main operating base of the NATO Boeing E-3 Sentry Component, one of two operational elements of the NATO Airborne Early Warning and Control Force.

== Location and history ==
NATO Air Base Geilenkirchen is located in the Federal Republic of Germany, near the village of Teveren and six kilometers west of the town of Geilenkirchen. The base is known to the local population as ‘Flugplatz Teveren’ and has an area of 620 hectares (1,500 acres). Part of the base perimeter is adjacent to the German-Dutch border.

Surrounded by farmland and a natural woodland reserve, the base was originally built by the British Royal Air Force (RAF) after World War II and operated as RAF Geilenkirchen from 1953 onwards. Various RAF fighter squadrons were based there from 1953 until 1968.

Flying operations at Geilenkirchen ended in January 1968 and the installation was handed over to the German Air Force in March 1968. In August of that year it became the home of the German Missile Wing 2, which was equipped with Pershing 1A missiles and supported by the 85th U.S. Army Field Artillery Detachment of the U.S. Army.

Following NATO's decision to establish the NATO Airborne Early Warning and Control Force program and to make the base near Teveren the Main Operating Base (MOB) of the E-3A Component, a major construction program was started in 1980 to modify the operational and support facilities.

In January 1980 the first E-3A Component personnel started arriving at the base, and in October 1980 the NATO Defense Planning Committee (DPC) granted the E-3A Component the status of a NATO International Military Headquarters. By the end of 1981, the German Pershing Wing had left the base and moved to Niederheid, north of Geilenkirchen, while the U.S. 85th Field Artillery Detachment remained on base until July 1991 and was then de-activated.

E-3A Component flying operations began in February 1982 after delivery of the first E-3A aircraft. Germany formally handed over the main operating base to NATO on 31 March 1982. The component was officially activated on 28 June 1982 and reached full operational capability by the end of 1988.

Major construction on the base initially included a new 3,000-metre (9,800 ft) runway with a width of 45 metres (148 ft), as well as aprons and taxiways, a control tower, an information technology wing building (which also houses flight simulator and mission simulator facilities), on-base accommodation and major renovation of the four existing hangars.

Since that time, most of the buildings on base have been renovated to present day standards and several new buildings have been erected.

== NATO E-3A Component ==
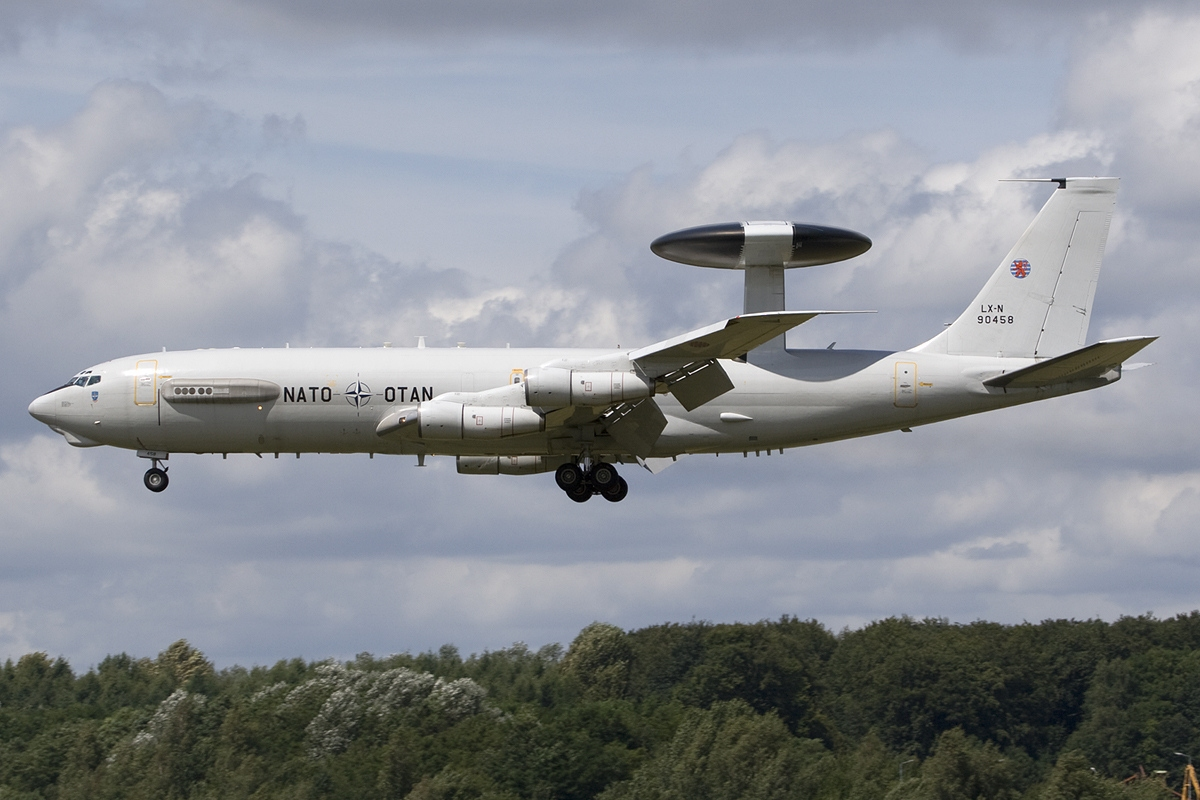
A Boeing E-3A Sentry of the NATO Airborne Early Warning and Control Force

The E-3A Component is NATO's first operational flying unit with multinational manning. The Component commander's position is of brigadier general rank and is held alternately by Germany and the USA. The Component's organisational structure comprises a headquarters staff and three major functional elements (Operations Wing, Logistics Wing, and Base Support Wing). Each Wing is commanded by a colonel, each from a different NATO member state.

The NATO Air Base's workforce consists of more than 2,500 military and civilian personnel. This figure includes personnel assigned to support functions, such as the engineering support teams of the Bundeswehr Service Centre, National Support Unit personnel, and morale and welfare activities staff.

== Operations ==
The component operates fourteen (out of an original order for 18) Boeing E-3A AWACS aircraft all of which are based on the Boeing 707 airframe (the component also operated three (3) Boeing 707 Trainer Cargo Aircraft, but these have been retired since 2011). These 14 aircraft of the NATO E-3A Component are all registered in Luxembourg as part of that country's contribution to the NATO AWACS programme.

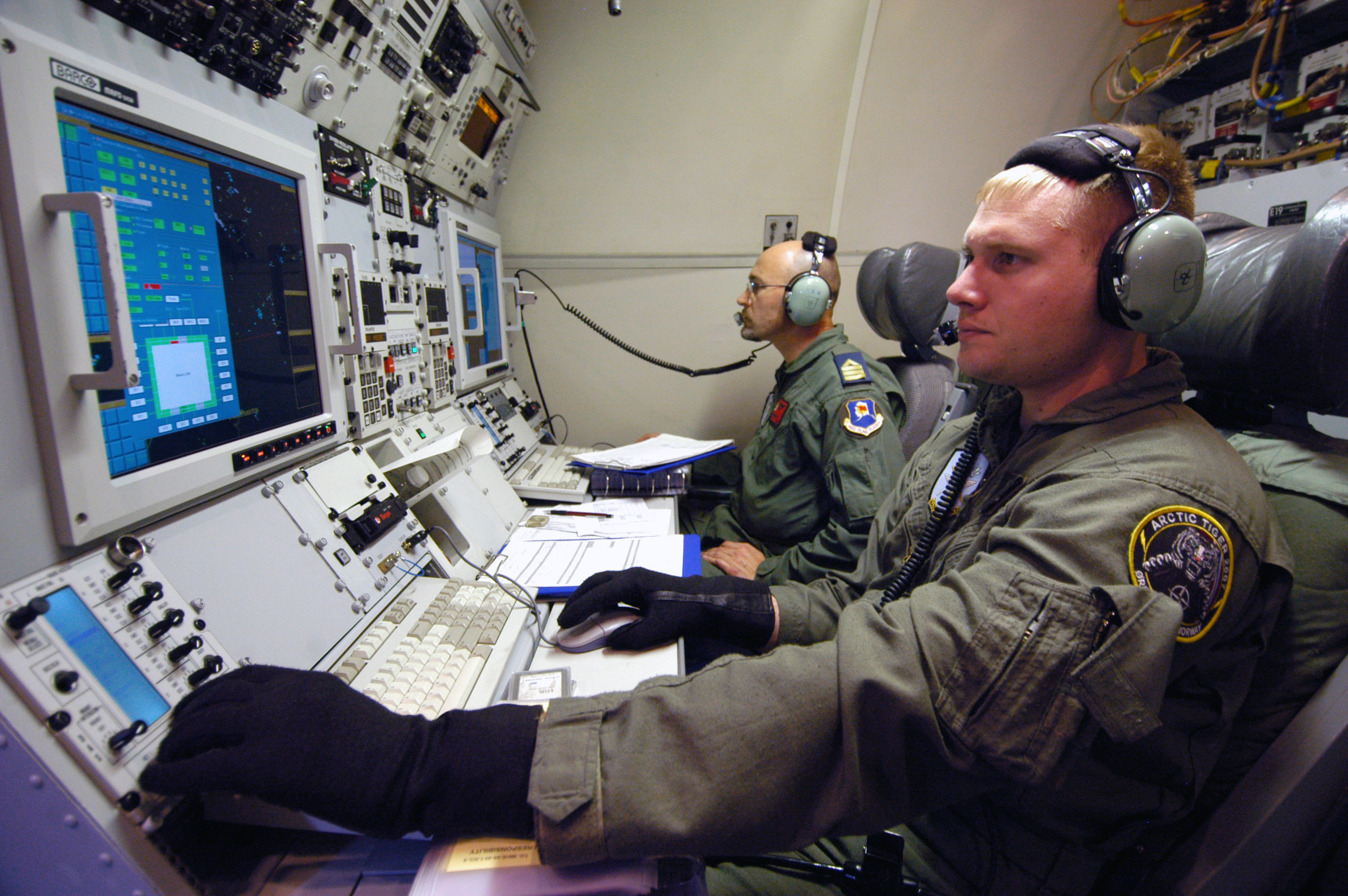
Personnel aboard a NATO E-3A Sentry

Since coming into service in the early 1980s, the aircraft and their onboard systems and associated ground-based equipment have undergone regular upgrading. Two major modernisation programmes have been accomplished since the early 1990s. The more recent of these, the Mid-term Modernization Programme, was completed in December 2018. It included the retrofitting of 14 E-3As with improved navigation systems, digital communication systems and five additional workstations, as well as the enhancement of two mission simulators. Currently, the mission systems are undergoing the modernisation programme called Final Lifetime Extension programme. As a result of this project the NATO AWACS will be able to continue to fulfill its intended role as an important NATO asset for maintaining peace and security.

Normally, only a certain number of the E-3As are present at NATO Air Base Geilenkirchen at any given time. The remainder are deployed to the component's forward operating bases in Greece, Italy, Turkey, and the forward operating location in Norway, or to locations elsewhere. Each of these forward operating facilities is located on a national airbase. The component has approximately thirty military and civilian assigned personnel at each site; these are NATO personnel, but all are from the respective host state.

== Economic significance ==
More than 2,500 personnel work at NATO Air Base Geilenkirchen. Therefore, the base has a significant economic impact on the surrounding communities.

An economic impact study compiled by the NATO E-3A Component shows a 2008 economic impact of €275.8 million within a 200 kilometers (120 mi) radius of the base (expenditure of €150.7 million on staff payroll and €81.3 million on base-related expenditures, plus a further €43.8 million impact through indirect creation of jobs in the region surrounding the base). This marks an increase of €10.7 million locally. The 2008 overall economic impact was €447.3 million, an increase of €22.8 million as compared to 2007. These numbers are under the assumption that the economic impact models used for bases located within the US transfer without modification to the EU situation.

== Noise pollution controversy ==
The fleet of E-3s has remained in operation since the Cold War and has adapted its mission to emerging security threats, primarily in European airspace. Despite stringent self-imposed flight restrictions, including conducting a significant portion of training flights at different airfields throughout Europe and North America, E-3A operations in Geilenkirchen cause noise pollution, according to a recent study by the Netherlands National Institute for Public Health and the Environment, affecting over 40,000 citizens of Parkstad Limburg across the nearby German-Dutch border, who have formed an NGO aiming to stop AWACS flights. The Dutch government has asked for a mid-life upgrade of the AWACS fleet to include upgrading the engines to make the fleet meet the maximum noise levels allowed for civilian air traffic. However, NATO has not committed to the expensive investment. Despite its economic importance to the region and the strategic importance for NATO of the base, the Dutch House of Parliament has adopted a motion to restrict the AWACS from Dutch airspace unless new engines are installed. However, the Dutch government decided not to implement this motion.
