= Hückelhoven =

- Town
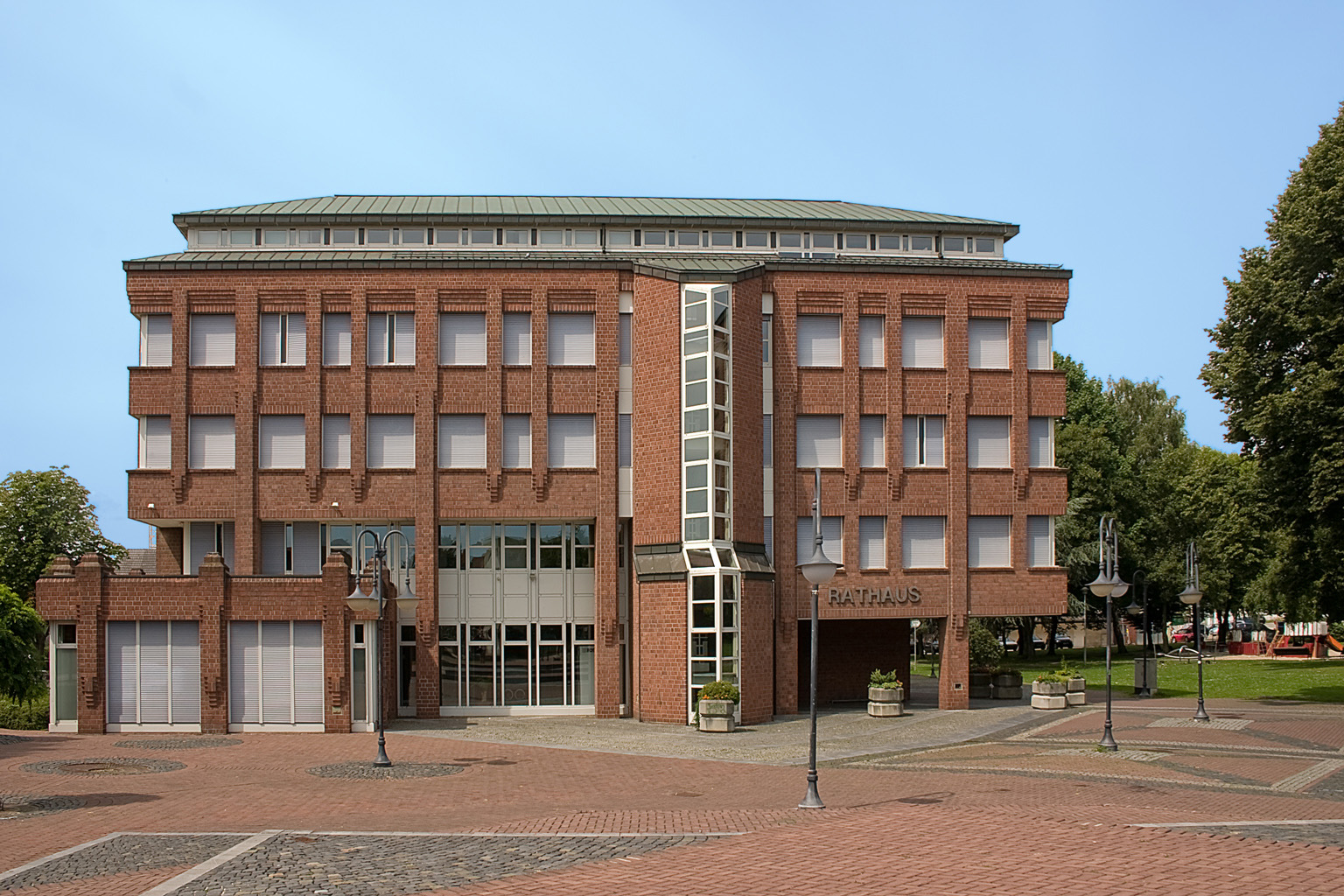
- Town hall

- Coat of arms

- Location of Hückelhoven within Heinsberg district
- Interactive map of Hückelhoven
- Location within Germany Location within North Rhine-Westphalia
- Coordinates: 51°03′39″N 6°13′11″E
- Country: Germany
- State: North Rhine-Westphalia
- Admin. region: Köln
- District: Heinsberg
- Subdivisions: 7

Government
  - Mayor (2020–25): Bernd Jansen (CDU)

Area
  - Total: 61.27 km^{2} (23.66 sq mi)
- Elevation: 75 m (246 ft)

Population (2025-12-31)
  - Total: 41,148
  - Density: 671.6/km^{2} (1,739/sq mi)
- Time zone: UTC+01:00 (CET)
  - Summer (DST): UTC+02:00 (CEST)
- Postal codes: 41836
- Dialling codes: 02433
- Vehicle registration: HS
- Website: www.hueckelhoven.de

Hückelhoven (German: [ˈhʏkl̩ˌhoːfn̩]; Limburgish: Hukkelhaove [ˈɦʏkəlˌɦɔː˦və]) is a town in the district of Heinsberg, in North Rhine-Westphalia, Germany. It is situated on the river Rur, approx. 10 km east of Heinsberg, 20 km south-west of Mönchengladbach and approximately 15 km from the border with the Netherlands. Hückelhoven owes its development from village to town to the coal mining industry; the Sophia-Jacoba colliery was opened in 1914. This colliery (the last in the Aachen coalfield) was closed in 1997.

== Town parts ==
The urban area of Hückelhoven extends in a north-south direction of around 10 km from Altmyhl to Brachelen and in an east-west direction of around 6 km from Hilfarth to Baal and Ratheim to Kleingladbach. This gives it a total area of 61.27 km². The urban area is divided into the following 11 districts.

- Altmyhl
- Baal
- Brachelen
- Doveren
- Hilfarth
- Hückelhoven
- Kleingladbach
- Millich
- Ratheim
- Rurich
- Schaufenberg

== History ==
The place name Hückelhoven with its place name ending in -hoven suggests that it was founded in the Carolingian to late Carolingian period (8th/9th century). However, modest grave finds from the northern edge of the town from the 6th century testify to a settlement beginning in the early Middle Ages.

In 1221, a Sibertus de Hukelhoven is mentioned in a document from Dalheim Abbey. 26 years later (1247), a knight Reinard von Hückelhoven, Reynardo milite de Hukilhoven, appears in a document, who had Haus Hückelhoven built. In 1350 the House of Hückelhoven (Heukelhoven) appears in a feudal register of the Lordship of Wassenberg. A Ludwig Mulstroe is enfeoffed with the Hückelhoven estate around 1470. At the end of the 16th century, this farm was remodelled and a two-storey brick building, ‘the castle’, was built.

In the Middle Ages and early modern times, the village belonged to the court of Doveren in the Wassenberg district of the Duchy of Jülich. In 1798, Hückelhoven was elevated by the French administration to a Mairie (mayor's office), and in 1799 the neighbouring villages of Hückelhoven and Doveren were merged to form the Mairie Doveren. 17 years later (1816), this division was retained under Prussian rule and Hückelhoven now belonged to the Prussian mayoralty of Doveren.

In 1935, the new municipality of Hückelhoven was formed from the villages of Hückelhoven, Hilfarth, Ratheim, Millich, Schaufenberg and part of Kleingladbach. It was given the name Hückelhoven-Ratheim on 7 January 1950. It was not until 1969 that the former municipality of Hückelhoven-Ratheim became a town. On 1 January 1972, the municipalities of Baal, Brachelen, Doveren, Rurich and the village of Altmyhl were incorporated. The legal basis for the incorporation was the Act on the Reorganisation of the Municipalities and Districts of the Aachen Reorganisation Area of 14 December 1971, known as the Aachen Act for short.

At the end of October 1944, the Gestapo set up a ‘labour education camp’, an ‘emergency prison’, in Hückelhoven. Several people, including forced labourers, were shot.

The town is a former colliery town where the Sophia-Jacoba trade union, for a long time the most modern coal mine in Europe, characterised the townscape and lifestyle for around 80 years. The colliery was closed on 27 March 1997 and since then Hückelhoven has undergone rapid and sometimes dramatic change. As a result of the colliery closure, the percentage of unemployed is significantly higher than the national average, but can still be considered relatively low compared to the Ruhr region due to numerous aid measures. An initial trend-setting goal to improve the attractiveness of the town centre was achieved by the attractive conversion of the ‘Alte Post’ on Parkhofstrasse into a lively business and service centre by private investors. In autumn 2004, the ‘Hückelhoven-Center’ was opened in Hückelhoven, which has attracted many people to the town on the Rur ever since. New shops, offices and doctors' surgeries were built on Wildauer Platz and completed in April 2010.

== Population ==
Historical population

| Year | Pop. | ±% p.a. |
|---|---|---|
| 1965 | 33,078 | — |
| 1970 | 34,032 | +0.57% |
| 1975 | 34,862 | +0.48% |
| 1980 | 35,199 | +0.19% |
| 1985 | 35,603 | +0.23% |
| 1990 | 34,816 | −0.45% |
| 1995 | 36,756 | +1.09% |

| Year | Pop. | ±% p.a. |
|---|---|---|
| 2000 | 38,970 | +1.18% |
| 2005 | 39,656 | +0.35% |
| 2010 | 39,215 | −0.22% |
| 2015 | 39,531 | +0.16% |
| 2020 | 40,425 | +0.45% |
| 2025 | 41,148 | +0.36% |

Source: Landesdatabank Nordrhein-Westfalen

== Twin towns – sister cities ==
Hückelhoven is twinned with:

- Breteuil, France
- Hartlepool, England, United Kingdom

== People ==
- Adolf Freiherr Spies von Büllesheim (1929-2011), German politician, farmer and lawyer
