= Fritz Burgbacher =

German politician (1900 - 1978)

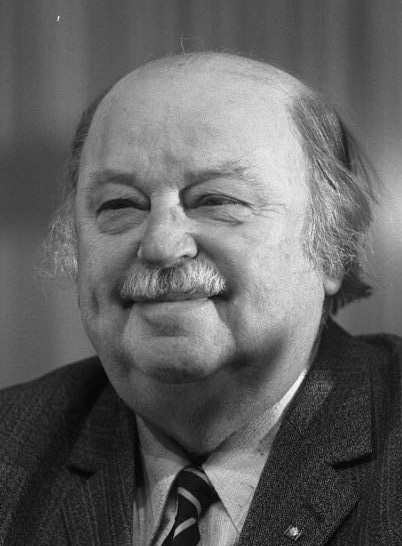
- Fritz Burgbacher, 1972

Member of the Bundestag
- In office 15 October 1957 – 13 December 1976

Personal details
- Born: 1 September 1900 Mainz
- Died: 29 July 1978 (aged 77) Köln, North Rhine-Westphalia, Germany
- Party: CDU
- Occupation: Professor

Fritz Burgbacher (1 September 1900 – 29 July 1978) was a German politician of the Christian Democratic Union (CDU) and former member of the German Bundestag.

== Life ==
In 1948 he joined the CDU. There he was state treasurer of the Rhineland regional association from 1952 to 1967 and federal treasurer from 1960 to 1967. He was a member of the German Bundestag from 1957 to 1976, where he initially represented the constituency of Geilenkirchen -Erkelenz - Jülich, later the constituency of Heinsberg. From 27 February 1958 to 19 January 1977, Burgbacher was also a member of the European Parliament, where he was Vice-President from March 1973 to November 1975, having already been Chairman of the Energy Committee there from 1958 to 1967. From 1967 to 1969, he was a member of the North Atlantic Assembly, where he chaired the Economic Committee.

== Literature ==
Herbst, Ludolf; Jahn, Bruno (2002). Vierhaus, Rudolf (ed.). Biographisches Handbuch der Mitglieder des Deutschen Bundestages. 1949–2002 [Biographical Handbook of the Members of the German Bundestag. 1949–2002] (in German). München: De Gruyter - De Gruyter Saur. p. 1715. ISBN 978-3-11-184511-1.
