= Leo Dautzenberg =

German politician

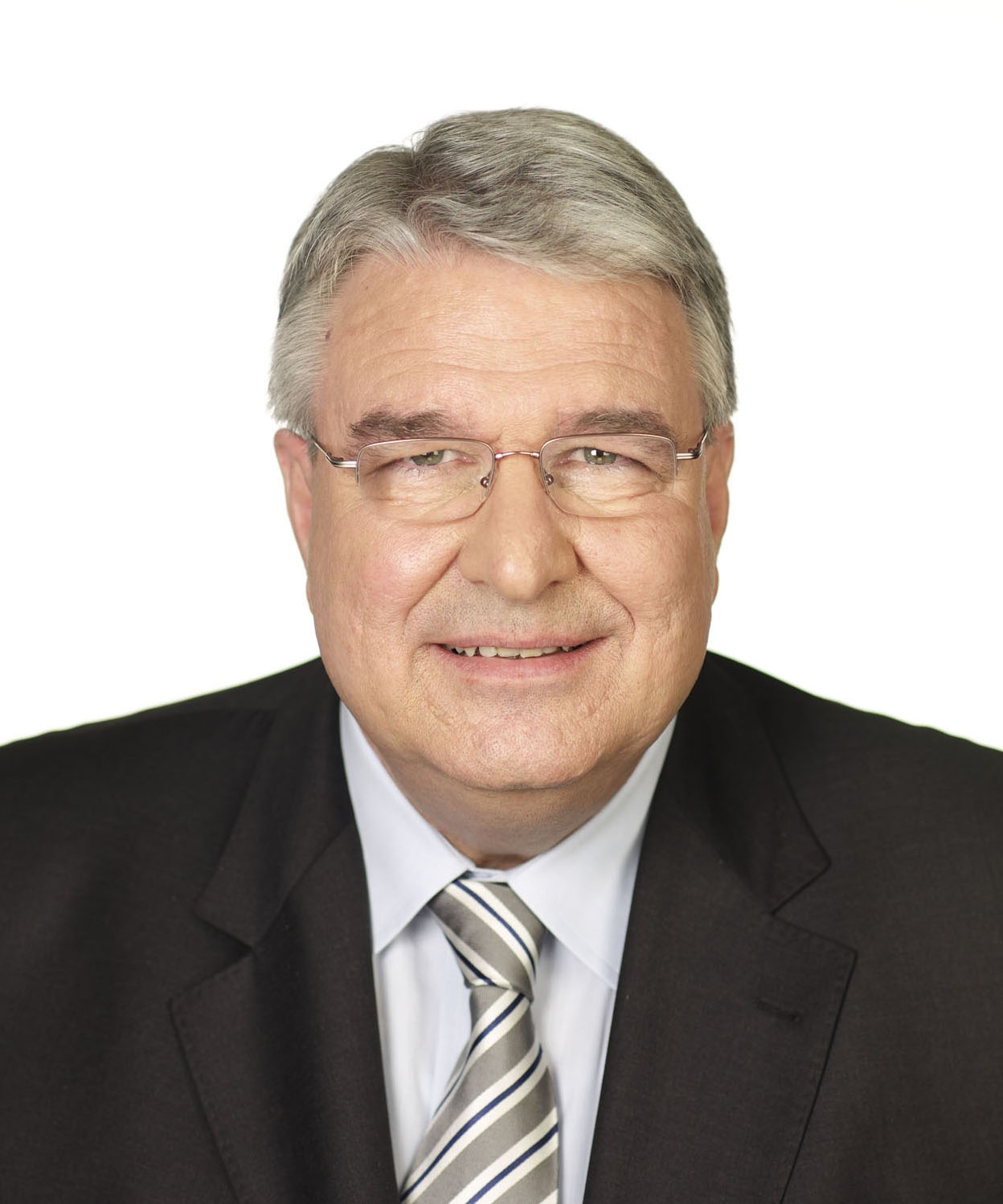
- Leo Dautzenberg in 2010

Member of the Bundestag
- In office 1998–2011

Personal details
- Born: 4 February 1950 (age 76) Gillrath, West Germany (now Germany)
- Party: CDU

Leo Dautzenberg (born 4 February 1950 in Gillrath, North Rhine-Westphalia) is a German politician of the Christian Democratic Union of Germany who served as a member of the Bundestag from 1998 to 2011.

From 2008 to 2010, Dautzenberg was a member of the parliamentary body providing oversight of the Special Financial Market Stabilization Funds (SoFFin).
