= Heinsberg (district) =

Coordinates: 51°00′N 6°10′E

- District
- Flag Coat of arms
- Country: Germany
- State: North Rhine-Westphalia
- Adm. region: Cologne
- Capital: Heinsberg

Government
  - District admin.: Stephan Pusch (CDU)

Area
  - Total: 627.7 km^{2} (242.4 sq mi)

Population (31 December 2024)
  - Total: 263,681
  - Density: 420.1/km^{2} (1,088/sq mi)
- Time zone: UTC+01:00 (CET)
  - Summer (DST): UTC+02:00 (CEST)
- Vehicle registration: ERK, GK, HS
- Website: www.kreis-heinsberg.de

Heinsberg is a Kreis (district) in the west of North Rhine-Westphalia, Germany with the town of Heinsberg as its capital. Neighbouring districts are Viersen, Neuss, Düren and Aachen, the city of Mönchengladbach and the Dutch province Limburg.

== Geography ==
Heinsberg is the most westerly district of Germany, reaching 5°52'E in Selfkant municipality.

Geographically it covers the lowlands of the Lower Rhine Bay.

=== Rivers ===
- Rur is the main river, crossing the district from southeast to northwest.
- Wurm flows into river Rur, in Heinsberg.
- Schwalm originates near Erkelenz.
- Niers rises near Kuckum.

=== Towns and municipalities ===
Clickable map of towns and municipalities in the district

Towns
1. Erkelenz
2. Geilenkirchen
3. Heinsberg
4. Hückelhoven
5. Übach-Palenberg
6. Wassenberg
7. Wegberg
Municipalities
1. Gangelt
2. Selfkant
3. Waldfeucht

== History ==
=== Development of the district ===
The area fell to Prussia in 1815, which in 1816 created the three districts Heinsberg, Erkelenz and Geilenkirchen. In 1932 the districts Heinsberg and Geilenkirchen were merged, and in 1972 Erkelenz district was merged as well. In 1975 the district reached its present size when the municipality Niederkrüchten was moved to the district Viersen.

=== Prominent role in the Covid-19 pandemic ===
The district became a center of the COVID-19 pandemic in Germany. The Robert Koch Institute listed Heinsberg as an especially affected area ("besonders betroffenes Gebiet"). Since the first cases were discovered in this area, the district was around two weeks "ahead" of the rest of Germany. A research group of the University of Bonn started to use the affected area as a testing site to study the novel coronavirus and to search for ways to handle the situation in the best possible way.

== Coat of arms ==
The coat of arms show two lions in the top part, in the left the silver lion of the city and the dukes of Heinsberg, in the right the black lion on yellow ground of the duchy of Jülich. The bottom part derives from the coat of arms of the former district Erkelenz, the fleur-de-lis from the city of Erkelenz represent the Maria-abbey in Aachen, and the blue flax flower in the middle remembers the old tradition of flax and linen trading in Erkelenz.
