= Cologne (region) =

Administrative district of North Rhine-Westphalia

Coordinates: 50°50′N 6°55′E

Cologne Köln (German)
- Regierungsbezirk
- Map of North Rhine-Westphalia highlighting Cologne
- Country: Germany
- State: North Rhine-Westphalia
- Region seat: Cologne

Government
  - District President: Thomas Wilk (SPD)

Area
  - Total: 7,364.71 km^{2} (2,843.53 sq mi)

Population (31 December 2025)
  - Total: 4,482,881
  - Density: 608.698/km^{2} (1,576.52/sq mi)

GDP
  - Total: €236.726 billion (2024)
  - Per capita: €52,770 (2024)
- Website: bezreg-koeln.nrw.de

Cologne is one of the five administrative districts (Regierungsbezirk) of the German state of North Rhine-Westphalia. It is located in the south-west of the state and covers the hills of the Eifel as well as the Bergisches Land.

It was created on 30 April 1815, as district of the province of Jülich-Cleves-Berg, when Prussia reorganised its internal administration. In 1972 most parts of Regierungsbezirk Aachen had been incorporated.

Kreise
(districts)
1. Aachen
2. Düren
3. Euskirchen
4. Heinsberg
5. Oberbergischer Kreis
6. Rhein-Erft-Kreis
7. Rhein-Sieg-Kreis
8. Rheinisch-Bergischer Kreis
Kreisfreie Städte
(district-free towns)
1. Aachen
2. Bonn
3. Cologne
4. Leverkusen

== Economy ==
The Gross domestic product (GDP) of the region was 190.8 billion € in 2018, accounting for 5.7% of German economic output. GDP per capita adjusted for purchasing power was 39,300 € or 130% of the EU27 average in the same year. The GDP per employee was 110% of the EU average.
