= Grossman =

Grossman (variants include Grosmann, Grossmann, Großmann, etc.) is a family name of Germanic origin, meaning large man.

- Achim Großmann (1947–2023), German politician
- Adam Grossman, guitarist and singer for the band Skrew
- Albert Grossman (1926–1986), American folk music entrepreneur and manager
- Alex Grossmann (1930–2019), Croatian-French physicist
- Allan Grossman (1910–1991), member of the Legislative Assembly of Ontario
- Allen Grossman (1932–2014), American poet; father of Bathsheba, Austin, and Lev
- Alan D. Grossman (fl. 2014?), American microbiologist
- Angela Grossmann (born 1955), Canadian artist
- Ashley Grossman (born 1993), American water polo player
- Aubrey Grossman, (1911–1999), American attorney and Communist leader
- Austin Grossman (born 1969), American writer and game designer
- Avraham Grossman (1936–2024), professor emeritus for Jewish history
- Bathsheba Grossman (born 1966), American artist from California
- Blake Grossman, chief executive officer of Barclays Global Investors
- Brooke Grossman (born 1978), American politician from Maryland
- Budd Grossman, American producer and screenwriter
- Burt Grossman, American football player
- Carl Großmann (1863–1922), German serial killer
- Christian Gottlob Leberecht Großmann (1783–1857), German theologian
- Dave Grossman (author) (born 1956), American police trainer and writer
- Dave Grossman (game developer) (fl. since 1989), American video game developer
- David Grossman (born 1954), Israeli novelist
- David Grossman (geographer) (1934–2025), Israeli historical geographer
- David Grossman (journalist), British broadcast journalist
- David C. Grossman (fl. 2000s), American pediatrician
- David Grossman (music executive) (born c. 1957), American exec at Paramount Pictures
- Dieter Grossmann (born 1926), German artist
- Edith Grossman (1936–2023), American translator from Spanish
- Elisabetha Grossmann (1795–1858), "The Fair Skipper of Brienz"
- Emanuel Grossman (1913–1954), Soviet pianist
- Emily Grossman, geneticist and science communicator
- Eric Grossman (born 1964), American bass guitarist
- Ernst August Friedrich Wilhelm Grossmann (1863–1933), German astronomer
- Gene Grossman, economist
- Gheorghe Grossman, aka Gheorghe Gaston Marin (1918–2010), Romanian politician
- Gregory Grossman, American economist
- Gustav Friedrich Wilhelm Großmann (1746–1796), German actor, librettist and stage director
- Haika Grossman, Israeli politician
- Hannes Grossmann, German death metal band member
- Heinrich Ernst Grosmann (1732–1811), Danish composer
- Henryk Grossman (1881–1950), Polish-German marxist economist and historian
- Ignaz Grossmann (1825–1897), Hungarian-born rabbi in Moravia, Croatia, and America
- Jerome Grossman (1917–2013), American activist
- Jiří Grossmann, Czech theatre actor, poet and composer
- Joel Grossman, political scientist
- Jonathan Grossman, legal theorist
- Judith Grossman, American writer
- Karl Grossman, American journalism academic
- Karol Grossmann (1864–1929), Slovene filmmaker
- Karolien Grosemans, Belgian politician
- Kurt Grossmann, German journalist
- Ladislav Grosman, novelist and screenwriter
- Larry Grossman (composer), composer of Broadway musicals
- Larry Grossman (politician), Canadian politician in Ontario
- Leslie Grossman, American actress
- Lev Grossman, American writer
- Louis Grossmann (1863–1926), Austrian-American rabbi
- Loyd Grossman, Anglo-American television presenter and chef
- Marc Grossman (born 1951), American diplomat
- Marcel Grossmann, Hungarian mathematician
- Mary Belle Grossman (1879–1977), American judge and suffragist
- Martin Grossman (1965–2010), American murderer
- Mindy Grossman, CEO of HSN, Inc.
- Nancy Grossman, American artist
- Naomi Grossman, American actress
- Natalia Grossman, (born 2001), American sport climber
- Nicklas Grossmann, Swedish ice hockey player
- Randy Grossman (born 1952), American football player
- Rex Grossman, American football player
- Rex Grossman Sr., American football player
- Richard Grossman (author) (1943–2011), American anti-globalization writer
- Richard Grossman (bassist), bassist for the Hoodoo Gurus and the Divinyls
- Richard Grossman (pianist) (1937–1992), American jazz pianist
- Richard Grossman (publisher), American publisher, founder of Grossman Publishers
- Robbie Grossman, American baseball player
- Robert Grossman, American painter, sculptor, filmmaker, and author
- Robert Lee Grossman, American computer scientist and bioinformatician
- Rudolph Grossman (1867–1927), Austrian-American rabbi
- Sally Grossman, widow of Albert Grossman and operator of the Woodstock-based Bearsville Records
- Sanford J. Grossman, American economist, John Bates Clark Medal winner in 1987
- Siegfried Großmann (1930–2025), German theoretical physicist
- Stefan Grossman, American guitarist and singer
- Steven Grossman, American politician and investor
- Ted Grossman, American radio personality
- Thomas Grossmann (born 1951), German writer and psychologist
- Tuvia Grossman, Jewish American student attacked by a violent Arab mob and later wrongly identified as a Palestinian
- Vasily Grossman (Васи́лий Семёнович Гро́ссман, 1905–1964), Soviet writer and war correspondent
- Victor Grossman (born Stephen Wechsler; 1928–2025), American publicist and author
- Yitzchak Dovid Grossman (born 1946), Israeli rabbi (the "Disco Rabbi")

== See also ==
- Grossmann Jet Service, Aviation company in Prague, Czech Republic
- Grossmann, a German place name in Moselle, France
