= David Grossman (disambiguation) =

David Grossman (born 1954) is an Israeli novelist.

David Grossman may also refer to:

- Dave Grossman (author) (born 1956), American police trainer and writer
- Dave Grossman (game developer) (fl. since 1989), American video game developer
- David Grossman (geographer) (1934–2025), Israeli historical geographer
- David Grossman (journalist), British broadcast journalist
- David C. Grossman (fl. 2000s), American pediatrician
- David Grossman (music executive) (born c. 1957), American exec at Paramount Pictures

== See also ==
- Dovid Grossman (1946–2018), American Talmudic lecturer and rabbi
- Yitzchak Dovid Grossman (born 1946), Israeli rabbi
- Grossman, the Germanic surname
