= Aachen II =

Federal electoral district of Germany

Coordinates: 50°43′N 5°58′E

87 Aachen II
- Electoral district for the Bundestag
- Aachen II in 2025
- State: North Rhine-Westphalia
- Population: 308,100 (2019)
- Electorate: 226,420 (2021)
- Major settlements: Eschweiler; Stolberg (Rhineland); Alsdorf
- Area: 546.1 km^{2}

Current electoral district
- Created: 1949
- Party: CDU
- Member: Catarina dos Santos-Wintz
- Elected: 2025

Aachen II is an electoral constituency (German: Wahlkreis) represented in the Bundestag. It elects one member via first-past-the-post voting. Under the current constituency numbering system, it is designated as constituency 87. It is located in western North Rhine-Westphalia, comprising the area of Städteregion Aachen outside the city of Aachen.

Aachen II was created for the inaugural 1949 federal election. From 2017–2025, it has been represented by Claudia Moll of the Social Democratic Party (SPD). Since 2025 it is represented by Catarina dos Santos-Wintz of the Christian Democratic Union of Germany.

== Geography ==
Aachen II is located in western North Rhine-Westphalia. As of the 2021 federal election, it comprises the Städteregion Aachen excluding the city of Aachen.

== History ==
Aachen II was created in 1949, then known as Aachen-Land. From 1980 through 2009, it was named Kreis Aachen. It acquired its current name in the 2013 election. In the 1949 election, it was North Rhine-Westphalia constituency 2 in the numbering system. In the 1953 through 1961 elections, it was number 61. From 1965 through 1998, it was number 54. From 2002 through 2009, it was number 89. In the 2013 through 2021 elections, it was number 88. From the 2025 election, it has been number 87.

Originally, the constituency was coterminous with the Landkreis Aachen district. In the 1965 and 1969 elections, it also contained the Monschau district. In the 1972 through 2009 elections, it was coterminous with Kreis Aachen district. Though its borders have not changed since 1972, the former district of Kreis Aachen was incorporated into the Städteregion Aachen in 2009.

Election	No.	Name	Borders
1949	2	Aachen-Land	Landkreis Aachen district
1953	61	Aachen-Land	Landkreis Aachen district
1957	61	Aachen-Land	Landkreis Aachen district
1961	61	Aachen-Land	Landkreis Aachen district
1965	54	Aachen-Land	Landkreis Aachen district; Monschau district
1969	54	Aachen-Land	Landkreis Aachen district; Monschau district
1972	54	Aachen-Land	Kreis Aachen district
1976	54	Aachen-Land	Kreis Aachen district
1980	54	Kreis Aachen	Kreis Aachen district
1983	54	Kreis Aachen	Kreis Aachen district
1987	54	Kreis Aachen	Kreis Aachen district
1990	54	Kreis Aachen	Kreis Aachen district
1994	54	Kreis Aachen	Kreis Aachen district
1998	54	Kreis Aachen	Kreis Aachen district
2002	89	Kreis Aachen	Kreis Aachen district
2005	89	Kreis Aachen	Kreis Aachen district
2009	89	Kreis Aachen	Kreis Aachen district
2013	88	Aachen II	Städteregion Aachen (excluding Aachen municipality)
2017	88	Aachen II	Städteregion Aachen (excluding Aachen municipality)
2021	88	Aachen II	Städteregion Aachen (excluding Aachen municipality)
2025	87	Aachen II	Städteregion Aachen (excluding Aachen municipality)

== Members ==
The constituency was first represented by Franz Mühlenberg of the Christian Democratic Union (CDU) from 1949 to 1961, followed by fellow CDU member Josef Müller until 1972. The constituency was won by the Social Democratic Party (SPD) candidate Kurt Koblitz in 1972, who served until 1980. Erich Berschkeit of the SPD then served a single term from 1980 to 1983. Hans Peter Schmitz regained the constituency for the CDU in 1983, but the SPD won again in 1987 with Achim Großmann. He served until 2009, when Helmut Brandt of the CDU was elected. Claudia Moll of the SPD was elected in 2017 and re-elected in 2021. In 2025 Catarina dos Santos-Wintz of the CDU beat Moll in that years election.

Election	Member	Party	%
1949	Franz Mühlenberg	CDU	50.2
1953	Franz Mühlenberg	CDU	56.1
1957	Franz Mühlenberg	CDU	61.2
1961	Josef Müller	CDU	56.2
1965	Josef Müller	CDU	53.2
1969	Josef Müller	CDU	49.8
1972	Kurt Koblitz	SPD	51.5
1976	Kurt Koblitz	SPD	48.1
1980	Erich Berschkeit	SPD	49.3
1983	Hans Peter Schmitz	CDU	49.6
1987	Achim Großmann	SPD	46.1
1990	Achim Großmann	SPD	44.7
1994	Achim Großmann	SPD	46.0
1998	Achim Großmann	SPD	53.1
2002	Achim Großmann	SPD	49.2
2005	Achim Großmann	SPD	46.0
2009	Helmut Brandt	CDU	40.2
2013	Helmut Brandt	CDU	45.6
2017	Claudia Moll	SPD	36.9
2021	Claudia Moll	SPD	34.5
2025	Catarina dos Santos-Wintz	CDU	40.1

== Election results ==
=== 2025 election ===
Federal election (2025): Aachen II
Notes:	Blue background denotes the winner of the electorate vote. Pink background denotes a candidate elected from their party list. Yellow background denotes an electorate win by a list member, or other incumbent. A ✓ or ✗ denotes status of any incumbent, win or lose respectively.						
Party	Candidate	Votes	%	±%	Party votes	%	±%
CDU	Catarina dos Santos Firnhaber	70,536	40.1	▲7.6	57,089	31.5	▲2.1
SPD	✗ Claudia Moll	53,748	30.5	▼3.9	37,902	20.9	▼10.6
AfD				▼7.5	34,578	19.1	▲11.8
Left	Florian Müller	13,329	7.6	▲4.9	12,303	6.8	▲3.7
Greens	Lukas Benner	13,269	7.5	▼4.3	17,002	9.4	▼2.4
FW	Andreas Wollermann	12,918	7.3	▲6.1	1,284	0.7	0.0
FDP	Natalie Pütz	8,190	4.7	▼2.5	7,599	4.2	▼6.4
BSW					7,358	4.1	
Volt	Marcel Verkooyen	4,001	2.3		1,026	0.6	▲0.3
Tierschutzpartei					2,531	1.4	▼0.1
PARTEI				▼1.7	882	0.5	▼0.4
dieBasis				▼1.0	378	0.2	▼0.7
Team Todenhöfer					349	0.2	▼0.4
Humanists					275	0.2	▲0.1
BD					192	0.1	
Values					109	0.1	
MERA25					80	0.0	
MLPD					27	0.0	0.0
Pirates							▼0.4
Gesundheitsforschung							▼0.1
ÖDP							▼0.1
Bündnis C							0.0
SGP						0.0	0.0
Informal votes		6,369			1,396		
Total valid votes		175,991			180,964		
Turnout		182,360	81.1	▲5.7			
CDU gain from SPD	Majority	16,788	9.6				

=== 2021 election ===
Federal election (2021): Aachen II
Notes:	Blue background denotes the winner of the electorate vote. Pink background denotes a candidate elected from their party list. Yellow background denotes an electorate win by a list member, or other incumbent. A ✓ or ✗ denotes status of any incumbent, win or lose respectively.						
Party	Candidate	Votes	%	±%	Party votes	%	±%
SPD	✓ Claudia Moll	58,189	34.5	▼2.4	53,408	31.6	▼3.7
CDU	Catarina dos Santos Firnhaber	54,808	32.5	▼4.0	49,838	29.5	▼1.2
Greens	Lukas Benner	19,976	11.8	▲7.3	19,918	11.8	▲6.9
AfD	Michael Winterich	12,632	7.5	▼1.3	12,409	7.3	▼1.3
FDP	Birgit Havenath	12,055	7.1	▲0.7	17,892	10.6	▼0.6
Left	Johannes Koch	4,496	2.7	▼2.5	5,259	3.1	▼2.8
Tierschutzpartei					2,525	1.5	▲0.8
PARTEI	Eckhard Heck	2,893	1.7		1,584	0.9	▲0.5
FW	Helmut Keischgens	2,034	1.2		1,131	0.7	▲0.5
dieBasis	Axel Susen	1,704	1.0		1,587	0.9	
Team Todenhöfer					1,012	0.6	
Pirates					613	0.4	▼0.1
Volt					471	0.3	
LIEBE					264	0.2	
NPD					189	0.1	▼0.1
Gesundheitsforschung					188	0.1	0.0
ÖDP					187	0.1	▼0.2
LfK					164	0.1	
Humanists					113	0.1	0.0
V-Partei3					86	0.1	0.0
du.					75	0.0	
PdF					52	0.0	
Bündnis C					43	0.0	
MLPD					23	0.0	0.0
DKP					21	0.0	0.0
LKR					18	0.0	
SGP					17	0.0	0.0
Informal votes		1,883			1,583		
Total valid votes		168,787			169,087		
Turnout		170,670	75.4	▼0.5			
SPD hold	Majority	3,381	2.0	▲1.6			

=== 2017 election ===
Federal election (2017): Aachen II
Notes:	Blue background denotes the winner of the electorate vote. Pink background denotes a candidate elected from their party list. Yellow background denotes an electorate win by a list member, or other incumbent. A ✓ or ✗ denotes status of any incumbent, win or lose respectively.						
Party	Candidate	Votes	%	±%	Party votes	%	±%
SPD	Claudia Moll	63,135	36.9	▲1.2	60,539	35.3	▲2.7
CDU	✗ Helmut Brandt	62,405	36.5	▼9.1	52,656	30.7	▼10.2
AfD	Markus Matzerath	15,114	8.8		14,853	8.7	▲5.4
FDP	Frank Schniske	11,038	6.4	▲4.1	19,213	11.2	▲6.3
Left	Gabriele Halili	8,785	5.1	▼0.7	10,105	5.9	▼0.6
Greens	Alexander Tietz-Latza	7,782	4.5	▼1.1	8,436	4.9	▼1.4
Tierschutzpartei					1,275	0.7	
PARTEI					817	0.5	0.0
Pirates	Maximilian Möhring	1,912	1.1	▼1.7	806	0.5	▼1.8
AD-DEMOKRATEN					675	0.4	
ÖDP	Kurt Rieder	1,005	0.6		488	0.3	▲0.2
NPD					423	0.2	▼0.8
FW					351	0.2	▼0.1
DiB					173	0.1	
DM					145	0.1	
BGE					135	0.1	
Volksabstimmung					133	0.1	▼0.1
V-Partei³					127	0.1	
Gesundheitsforschung					116	0.1	
Die Humanisten					78	0.0	
MLPD					43	0.0	0.0
DKP					15	0.0	
SGP					5	0.0	0.0
Informal votes		1,973			1,542		
Total valid votes		171,176			171,607		
Turnout		173,149	75.9	▲3.8			
SPD gain from CDU	Majority	730	0.4				

=== 2013 election ===
Federal election (2013): Aachen II
Notes:	Blue background denotes the winner of the electorate vote. Pink background denotes a candidate elected from their party list. Yellow background denotes an electorate win by a list member, or other incumbent. A ✓ or ✗ denotes status of any incumbent, win or lose respectively.						
Party	Candidate	Votes	%	±%	Party votes	%	±%
CDU	✓ Helmut Brandt	73,621	45.6	▲5.4	66,328	40.9	▲7.4
SPD	Hans Detlef Loosz	57,635	35.7	▲1.4	52,897	32.6	▲3.6
Left	Marika Jungblut	9,418	5.8	▼2.7	10,538	6.5	▼2.9
Greens	Bettina Herlitzius	9,096	5.6	▼1.4	10,220	16.3	▼1.6
Pirates	Kai Baumann	4,543	2.8		3,712	2.3	▲0.5
FDP	Petra Müller	3,827	2.4	▼6.0	7,948	4.9	▼9.9
AfD					5,337	3.3	
NPD	Willibert Kunkel	2,153	1.3	▼0.2	1,697	1.0	▼0.1
REP	Mario Mauritz	1,256	0.8		792	0.5	0.0
PARTEI					719	0.4	
FW					551	0.3	
Volksabstimmung					338	0.2	
PRO					320	0.2	
Nichtwahler					225	0.1	
ÖDP					213	0.1	▲0.1
BIG					111	0.1	
Party of Reason					104	0.1	
RRP					77	0.0	▼0.1
Die Rechte					55	0.0	
BüSo					30	0.0	0.0
PSG					30	0.0	0.0
MLPD					26	0.0	0.0
Informal votes		3,027			2,308		
Total valid votes		161,549			162,268		
Turnout		164,576	72.1	▲1.7			
CDU hold	Majority	15,986	9.9	▲4.0			

=== 2009 election ===
Federal election (2009): Kreis Aachen
Notes:	Blue background denotes the winner of the electorate vote. Pink background denotes a candidate elected from their party list. Yellow background denotes an electorate win by a list member, or other incumbent. A ✓ or ✗ denotes status of any incumbent, win or lose respectively.						
Party	Candidate	Votes	%	±%	Party votes	%	±%
CDU	Helmut Brandt	63,511	40.2	▲0.6	53,062	33.5	▼0.8
SPD	Martin Peters	54,205	34.3	▼11.7	45,981	29.0	▼11.9
Left	Andreas Müller	13,502	8.5	▲3.3	14,926	9.4	▲3.1
FDP	Stefan Rohmann	13,275	8.4	▲4.2	23,518	14.8	▲5.5
Greens	Bettina Herlitzius	11,056	7.0	▲3.4	12,491	7.9	▲1.9
Pirates					2,764	1.7	
NPD	Willibert Kunkel	2,501	1.6	▲0.3	1,767	1.1	▲0.2
Tierschutzpartei					1,107	0.7	▲0.2
REP					820	0.5	0.0
FAMILIE					792	0.5	0.0
RENTNER					597	0.4	
RRP					239	0.2	
Volksabstimmung					125	0.1	0.0
DVU					114	0.1	
ÖDP					81	0.1	
Centre					70	0.0	
BüSo					29	0.0	▼0.0
MLPD					19	0.0	0.0
PSG					18	0.0	0.0
Informal votes		2,766			2,296		
Total valid votes		158,050			158,520		
Turnout		160,816	70.4	▼7.4			
CDU gain from SPD	Majority	9,306	5.9				

=== 2005 election ===
Federal election (2005): Kreis Aachen
Notes:	Blue background denotes the winner of the electorate vote. Pink background denotes a candidate elected from their party list. Yellow background denotes an electorate win by a list member, or other incumbent. A ✓ or ✗ denotes status of any incumbent, win or lose respectively.						
Party	Candidate	Votes	%	±%	Party votes	%	±%
SPD	✓ Achim Großmann	79,617	46.0	▼3.2	71,160	41.0	▼3.9
CDU	Helmut Brandt	68,563	39.6	▲1.7	59,633	34.3	▼0.9
Left	Jürgen Müller	9,139	5.30	▲4.5	11,003	6.30	▲5.4
FDP	Rene Otten	7,308	4.2	▼2.0	16,243	9.30	▼0.1
Greens	Werner Krickel	6,205	3.6	▼0.3	10,309	5.9	▼1.0
NPD	Willibert Kunkel	2,302	1.3	▲1.0	1,676	1.0	▲0.7
Tierschutzpartei					941	0.5	▲0.2
REP					926	0.5	▼0.1
Familie					818	0.5	▲0.2
GRAUEN					584	0.3	▲0.2
From Now on... Democracy Through Referendum					173	0.1	
PBC					90	0.1	
Socialist Equality Party					76	0.0	
Centre					42	0.0	
MLPD					37	0.0	0.0
Informal votes		3,509			2,894		
Total valid votes		173,134			173,749		
Turnout		176,643	77.80	▼2.7			
SPD hold	Majority	11,054	6.40				
