= University Challenge 2012–13 =

British television quiz programme

Series 42 of University Challenge began on 16 July 2012 on BBC Two.

It also marked the 50th anniversary of the show’s formation.

Because of the live coverage of the 2012 Summer Olympics in London which took place from 27 July 2012 to 12 August 2012, University Challenge was off air until 13 August 2012.

== Results ==
- Winning teams are highlighted in **bold**.
- Teams with green scores (winners) returned in the next round, while those with red scores (losers) were eliminated.
- Teams with orange scores must win one more match to return in the next round (current highest scoring losers, teams that won their first quarter final match, teams that won their second quarter final match having lost their first, or teams that won their first quarter final match and lost their second).
- Teams with yellow scores indicate that two further matches must be played and won (teams that lost their first quarter final match).
- A score in italics indicates a match decided on a tie-breaker question.

=== First round ===
Team 1	Score		Team 2	Total	Broadcast Date
Trinity Laban Conservatoire of Music and Dance	105	185	**University of York**	290	16 July 2012
**St George's, University of London**	175	145	King's College, Cambridge	320	23 July 2012
Wadham College, Oxford	105	120	**University of Bristol**	225	13 August 2012
University of Strathclyde	70	245	**University of Durham**	315	20 August 2012
Queen Mary, University of London	120	150	**Jesus College, Oxford**	270	27 August 2012
**Magdalen College, Oxford**	205	125	Sidney Sussex College, Cambridge	330	3 September 2012
Lincoln College, Oxford	175	180	**University of Manchester**	355	10 September 2012
**Imperial College London**	225	80	Jesus College, Cambridge	305	17 September 2012
University of St Andrews	105	125	**Bangor University**	230	24 September 2012
**Pembroke College, Cambridge**	200	140	University of Lancaster	340	1 October 2012
**University of Bath**	125	110	University of Liverpool	235	8 October 2012
**University College London**	260	85	University of Exeter	345	15 October 2012
**New College, Oxford**	230	145	Homerton College, Cambridge	375	22 October 2012
**University of Warwick**	175	100	University of Aberdeen	275	29 October 2012

==== Highest Scoring Losers play-offs ====
Team 1	Score		Team 2	Total	Broadcast Date
Lincoln College, Oxford	120	165	**University of Lancaster**	285	5 November 2012
Homerton College, Cambridge	160	205	**King's College, Cambridge**	365	12 November 2012

=== Second round ===
Team 1	Score		Team 2	Total	Broadcast Date
**Pembroke College, Cambridge**	255	75	University of Bath	330	19 November 2012
University of York	145	215	**New College, Oxford**	360	26 November 2012
University of Warwick	160	185	**King's College, Cambridge**	345	3 December 2012
**St George's, University of London**	230	140	University of Lancaster	370	10 December 2012
Magdalen College, Oxford	90	220	**University of Manchester**	310	7 January 2013
University of Bristol	115	245	**Imperial College London**	360	14 January 2013
**University College London**	215	180	Jesus College, Oxford	395	21 January 2013
**Bangor University**	175	165	University of Durham	340	28 January 2013

=== Quarter-finals ===
Team 1	Score		Team 2	Total	Broadcast Date
**University of Manchester**	185	115	Imperial College London	300	4 February 2013
**University College London**	190	125	Bangor University	315	11 February 2013
Pembroke College, Cambridge	105	195	**St George's, University of London**	300	18 February 2013
**New College, Oxford**	165	125	King's College, Cambridge	290	25 February 2013
University of Manchester	150	230	**University College London**	380	4 March 2013
Imperial College London	120	210	**Bangor University**	330	11 March 2013
St George's, University of London	110	160	**New College, Oxford**	270	18 March 2013
Pembroke College, Cambridge	135	150	**King's College, Cambridge**	285	25 March 2013
**University of Manchester**	220	135	St George's, University of London	355	1 April 2013
**Bangor University**	195	70	King's College, Cambridge	265	8 April 2013

=== Semi-finals ===
Team 1	Score		Team 2	Total	Broadcast Date
**University College London**	195	115	New College, Oxford	310	15 April 2013
**University of Manchester**	160	95	Bangor University	255	22 April 2013

=== Final ===
Team 1	Score		Team 2	Total	Broadcast Date
University College London	140	190	**University of Manchester**	330	29 April 2013

- The trophy and title were awarded to the Manchester team of David Brice, Adam Barr, Richard Gilbert and Debbie Brown.
- The trophy was presented by the Astronomer Royal Martin Rees.

== Spin-off: Christmas Special 2012 ==
Each year, a Christmas special sequence is aired featuring distinguished alumni. Out of 7 first-round winners, the top 4 highest-scoring teams progress to the semi-finals. The teams consist of celebrities who represent their alma maters.

=== Results ===
- Winning teams are highlighted in **bold**.
- Teams with green scores (winners) returned in the next round, while those with red scores (losers) were eliminated.
- Teams with grey scores won their match but did not achieve a high enough score to proceed to the next round.
- A score in italics indicates a match decided on a tie-breaker question.

First Round

Team 1	Score		Team 2	Total	Broadcast date
University of Bristol	135	140	**University of Leeds**	275	17 December 2012
**Newcastle University**	120	110	Loughborough University	230	18 December 2012
**New College, Oxford**	240	160	London School of Economics	400	19 December 2012
**University of Liverpool**	165	140	Cardiff University	305	20 December 2012
**Newnham College, Cambridge**	155	110	University of Nottingham	265	21 December 2012
University of Exeter	125	165	**University of Glasgow**	290	31 December 2012
University of Birmingham	115	195	**University of East Anglia**	310	1 January 2013

==== Standings for the winners ====
Rank	Team	Team captain	Score
1	New College, Oxford	Kate Mosse	240
2	University of East Anglia	David Grossman	205
3=	University of Liverpool	Stephen Bayley	165
3=	University of Glasgow	Neil Oliver	165
5	Newnham College, Cambridge	Rosemary Leonard	155
6	University of Leeds	Alistair McGowan	140
7	Newcastle University	Heather McGregor	120

Semi-finals

Team 1	Score		Team 2	Total	Broadcast date
**New College, Oxford**	220	125	University of Liverpool	345	2 January 2013
University of Glasgow	115	150	**University of East Anglia**	265	3 January 2013

Final

Team 1	Score		Team 2	Total	Broadcast date
**New College, Oxford**	205	110	University of East Anglia	315	4 January 2013

The New College, Oxford team of Rachel Johnson, Patrick Gale, Kate Mosse and Yan Wong beat the University of East Anglia team of John Boyne, Razia Iqbal, David Grossman and Charlie Higson.
