= Claudia Moll =

German politician

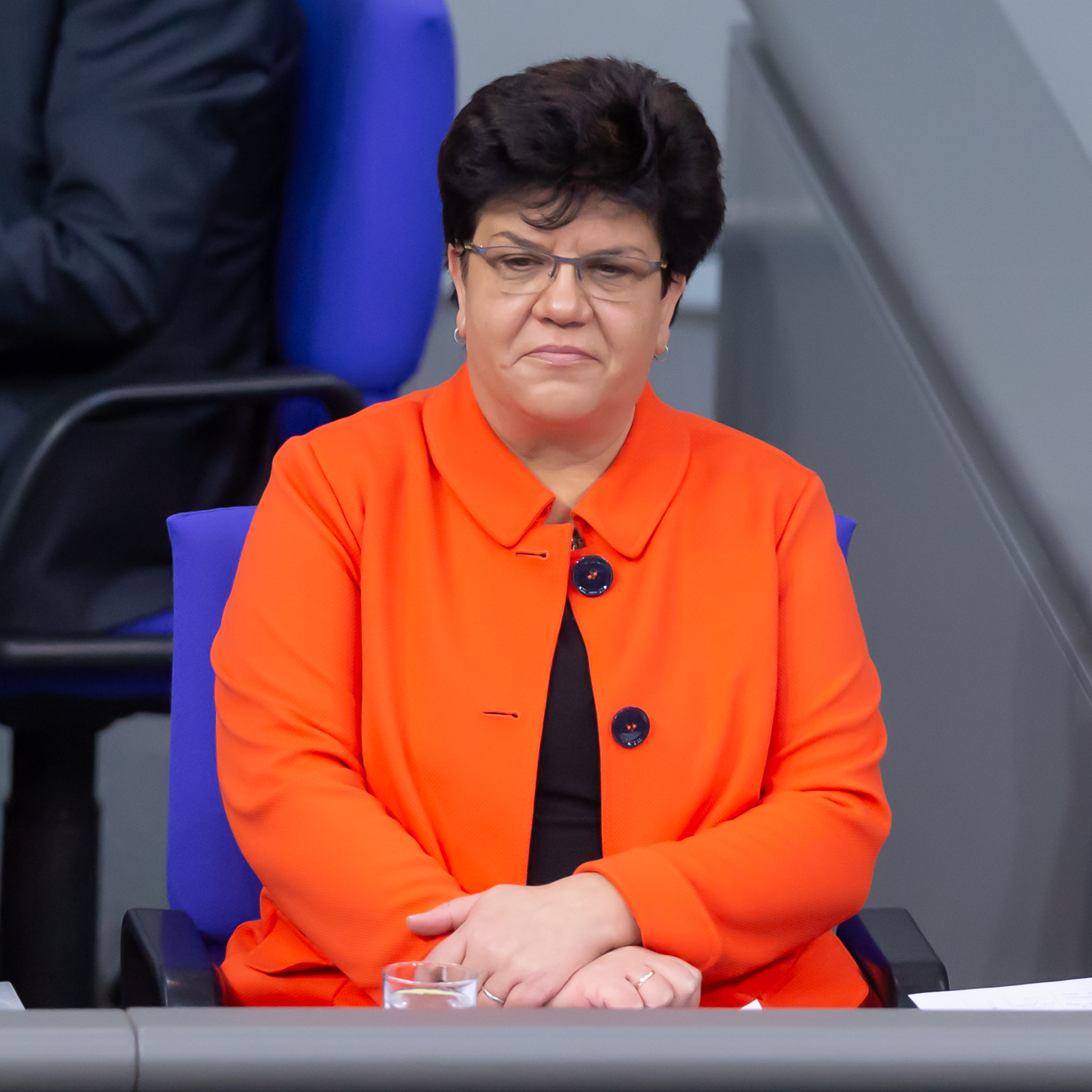
- Claudia Moll in 2020

Member of the Bundestag for Aachen II
- Incumbent
- Assumed office 2017
- Preceded by: Helmut Brandt

Personal details
- Born: 25 December 1968 (age 57) Eschweiler, West Germany (now Germany)
- Party: SPD

Claudia Moll (born 25 December 1968) is a German politician of the Social Democratic Party (SPD) who has been serving as a member of the Bundestag from the state of North Rhine-Westphalia since 2017.

In addition to her parliamentary work, Moll served as Commissioner for Long-Term Care at the Federal Ministry of Health in the government of Chancellor Olaf Scholz from 2022 to 2025.

== Political career ==
Moll first became a member of the Bundestag in the 2017 German federal election in Aachen II, defeating Helmut Brandt from the CDU. In parliament, she is a member of the Health Committee. In addition to her committee assignments, she has been a member of the German delegation to the Franco-German Parliamentary Assembly since 2022.

== Other activities ==
- German Foundation for World Population (DSW), Member of the Parliamentary Advisory Board
- German United Services Trade Union (ver.di), Member
