= Dovid Grossman =

Talmudic lecturer

Rabbi Dovid Grossman
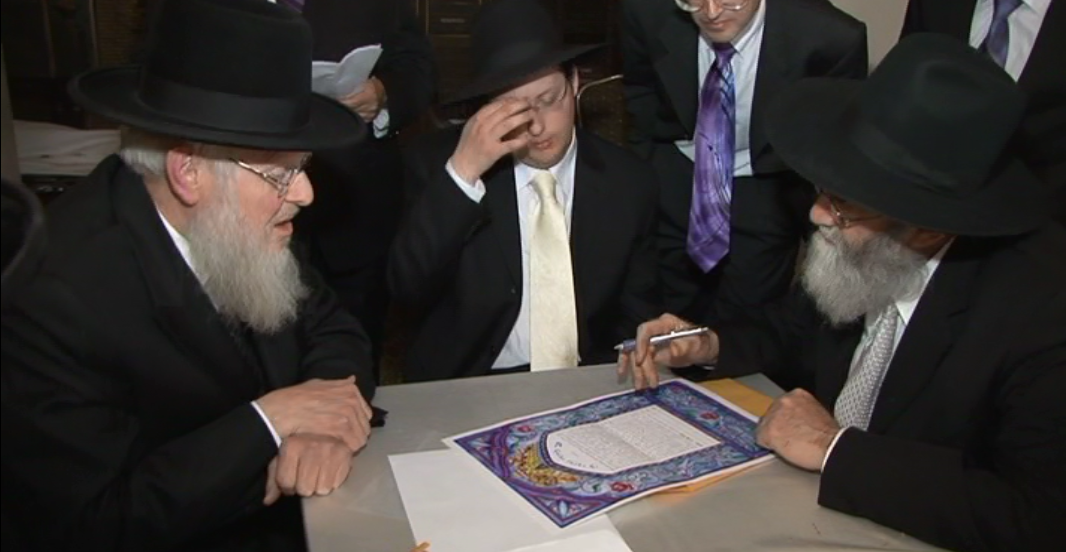
- Rabbi Dovid Grossman at a student's wedding. Pictured (left-right): Rabbi Eliezer Gross (Rosh Yeshiva of Yeshiva Gedolah of Los Angeles), Rabbi Reuven Chaim Klein, and Rabbi Dovid Grossman.
- Title: Rosh Yeshiva of Yeshivas HaChaim (Los Angeles)

Personal life
- Born: 1946 Boro Park
- Died: 5 February 2018 (aged 71–72) Staten Island, New York
- Buried: 6 February 2018
- Spouse: Rachel Grossman (principal of Valley Torah High School's girls division)
- Parent(s): Max Grossman; Mildred Grossman
- Education: Talmudical Yeshiva of Philadelphia and Mir Yeshiva (Jerusalem)

Religious life
- Religion: Judaism
- Denomination: Haredi
- Yeshiva: Yeshiva Gedolah of Los Angeles
- Position: Maggid Shiur (1981-2008)
- Residence: Los Angeles, California

Dovid Grossman (1946 – 5 February 2018) was a well-known Talmudic lecturer and Talmid Chochom who disseminated Torah worldwide.

== Biography ==
Rabbi Tuvia Goldstein, his 12th grade rebbi (teacher) in Rabbi Jacob Joseph School, encouraged Grossman to enroll in the Talmudical Yeshiva of Philadelphia after high school. Grossman studied under Rabbi Elya Svei and Rabbi Shmuel Kamenetsky. While en route to Israel, he also learned one Elul zman in a branch of the Novardok yeshiva in France.

In Israel, he joined Yeshiva Mir in Jerusalem, where he became a student of its Rosh Yeshiva, Rabbi Chaim Shmuelevitz. In Jerusalem, Grossman developed a personal relationship with Rabbi Meir Soloveichik, a son of Rabbi Yitzchak Zev Soloveitchik.

After returning to the United States, Grossman learned in the Lakewood Kollel. After 7 years there, he became one of the founding members of the Lakewood Kollel branch in Los Angeles. In 1981, he helped start Yeshiva Gedolah of Los Angeles (YGLA), where he served as the 12th grade Talmud lecturer until 2008. Concurrently with position as lecturer at YGLA, he opened a Torah program called Yeshivas HaChaim for working young adults and college students, independent of the Yeshiva.

Grossman was known for his Talmud lectures. Recordings of his lectures on every page of the Talmud (Daf Yomi) are available and widely used. Those lectures were repackaged and sold in a digital format as a customized iPod dubbed the Shaspod.

== Personal life ==
Grossman married his wife, Rachel, principal of Valley Torah High School's girls division in Valley Village, California.

Grossman died following a motor vehicle accident on the morning of February 5, 2018, on the West Shore Expressway in Staten Island, New York, shortly after 4 a.m.

== External links to some of his many thousand lectures ==
Rabbi Grossman on TorahDownloads.com

Rabbi Grossman on englishtorahtapes.com

- Rabbi Grossman on Torah Media
- Rabbi Grossman on dafyomi.org
- Yeshiva Gedolah of Los Angeles
