= Helmut Brandt =

German politician (born 1950)

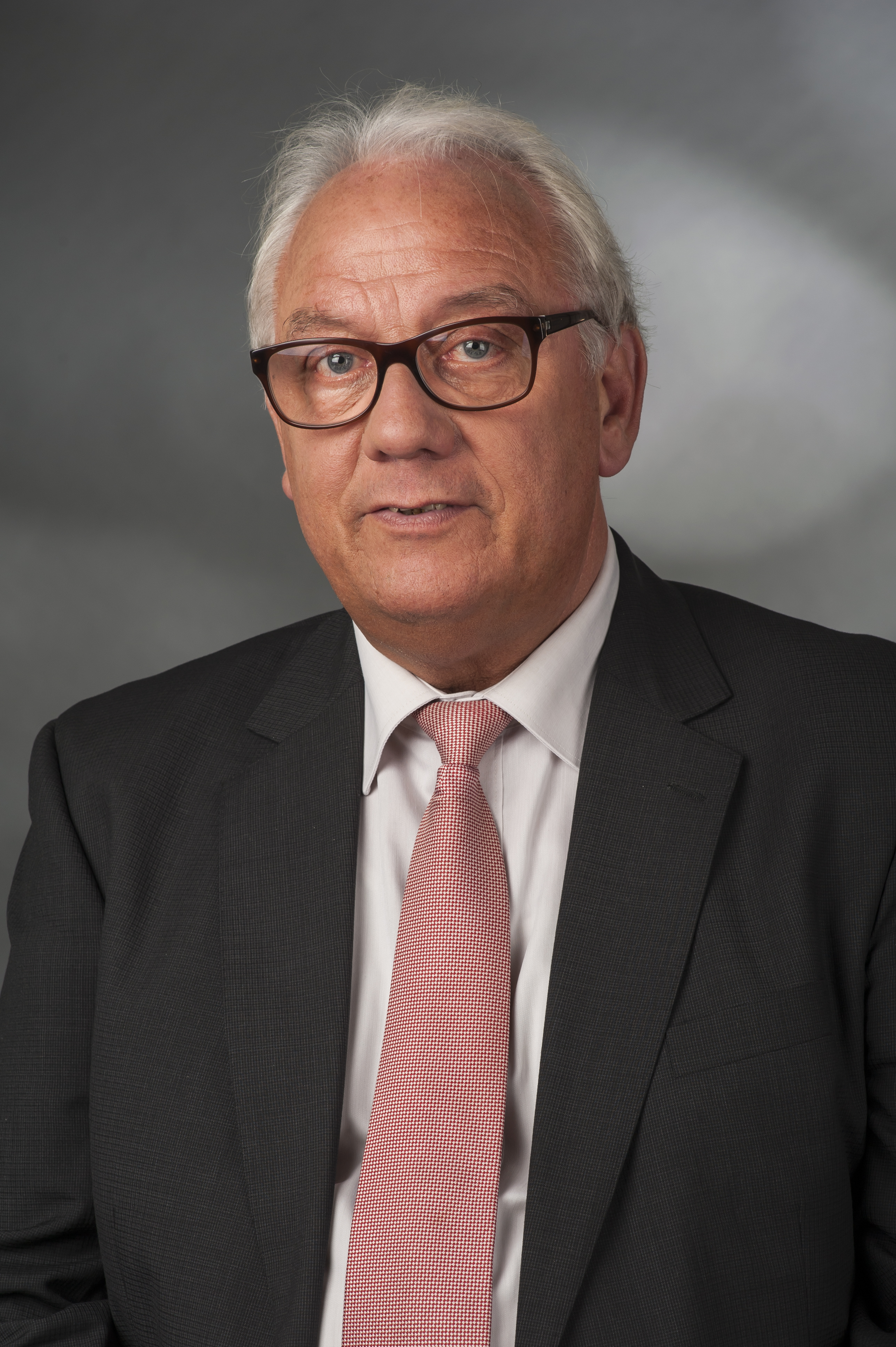

Member of the Bundestag Germany
- Incumbent
- Assumed office 18 June 2005

Personal details
- Born: 24 October 1950 (age 75) Würselen, North Rhine-Westphalia, West Germany
- Party: CDU
- Children: 2
- Occupation: Politician
- http://www.helmut-brandt.de/

Helmut Brandt (born 24 October 1950) is a German politician, member of the CDU, and Legal Counsel (Justiziar) for the CDU/CSU Parliamentary Group. He has been a member of the Bundestag since 28 June 2005, when he replaced Karl-Josef Laumann, who had been appointed a minister in North Rhine-Westphalia. Brandt, a lawyer by training specialising in criminal law, was mayor of Alsdorf in North Rhine-Westphalia from 1994 to 1999, having been a councillor there since 1978.

== Life and work ==
After completing his Abitur in Herzogenrath, Brandt undertook his mandatory national service before earning a degree in law from the University of Bonn. In Bonn, he became a member of the K.D.St.V. Novesia Bonn, a Catholic fraternity. After completing a training period, he passed the second and final exam to become a lawyer and has, since that time, been active as a lawyer in Alsdorf, practicing criminal law.

Helmut Brandt is married and has two children.

== Party ==
Brandt has belonged to the CDU since 1969 and is currently the Deputy Chairman of the CDU district association Aachen.

== Public office ==
Helmut Brandt belonged to the city council of Alsdorf from 1978 to 1994, where he was the local chairperson of the CDU until 1994. Helmut Brandt was mayor of Alsdorf from 1994 until 1999. Since 1999, he has been a member of the district council in the area surrounding Aachen. On 28 June 2005 Brandt took over Karl-Josepf Laumann's place in the German Parliament. He is a member of the Home Affairs Committee in the German Parliament, which deals with immigration, national security, and public service. After the federal elections of 2005, Helmut Brandt entered Parliament through the North Rhine-Westphalia party lists. In the 2009 federal elections, he won a seat for the Aachen II constituency (which includes the communities around Aachen, but not the city itself) with 40.2 percent of the primary vote. In the 2013 federal elections, Helmut Brandt defended his seat with 45.6 percent of the primary vote.
