= Lukas Benner =

German politician (born 1996)

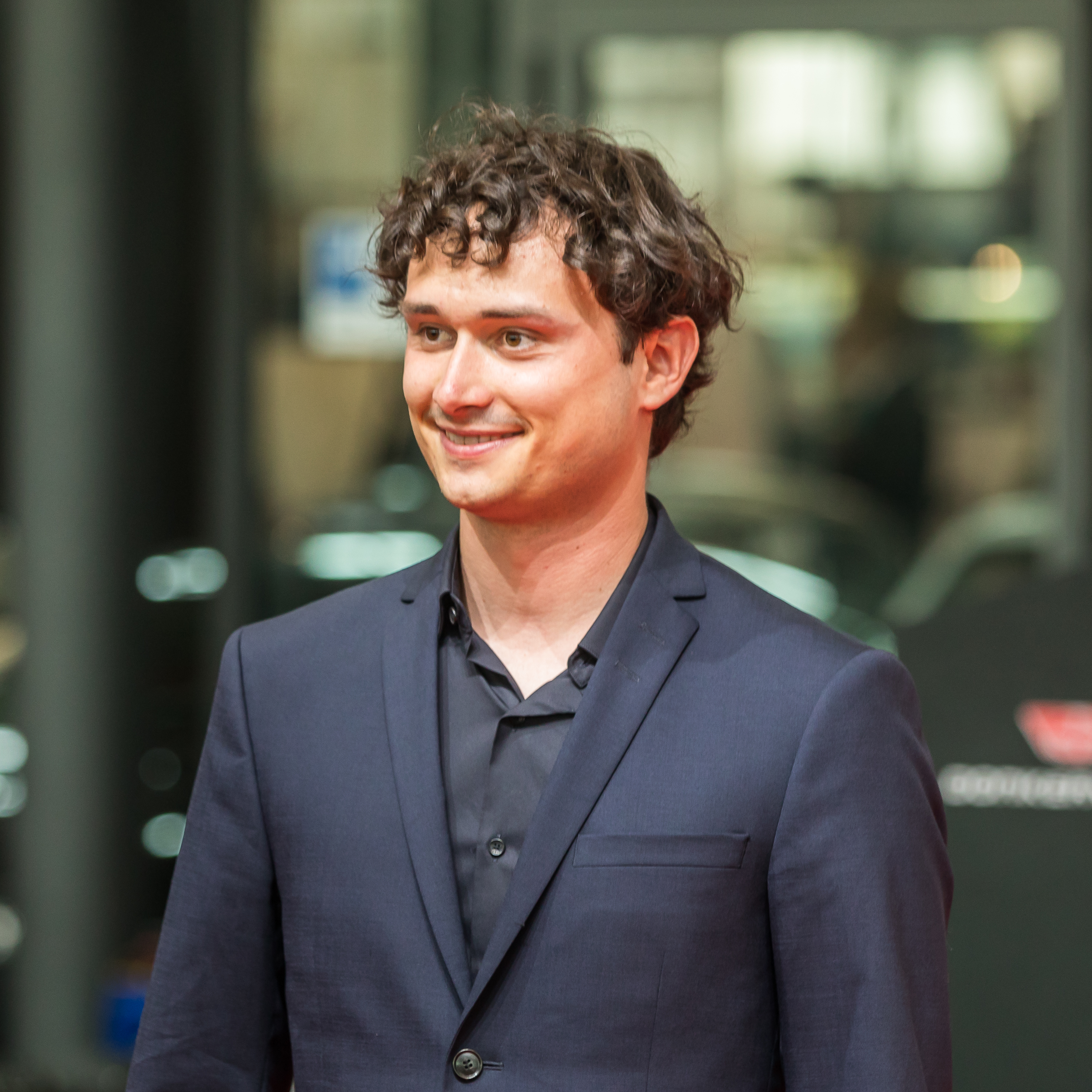

Member of the Bundestag
- Incumbent
- Assumed office 26 October 2021
- Constituency: North Rhine-Westphalia

Personal details
- Born: 20 February 1996 (age 30) Aachen, Germany
- Party: Alliance 90/The Greens
- Education: University of Bonn

Lukas Benner (born 20 February 1996) is a German politician of Alliance 90/The Greens who has been serving as a member of the Bundestag since the 2021 elections, representing the Aachen II district.

== Early life and education ==
Benner attended the Inda-Gymnasium in Aachen, where he received his Abitur in 2014.

== Political career ==
In parliament, Benner has been serving on the Committee on Legal Affairs and the Committee on Petitions.
