= Catarina dos Santos-Wintz =

German politician (born 1994)

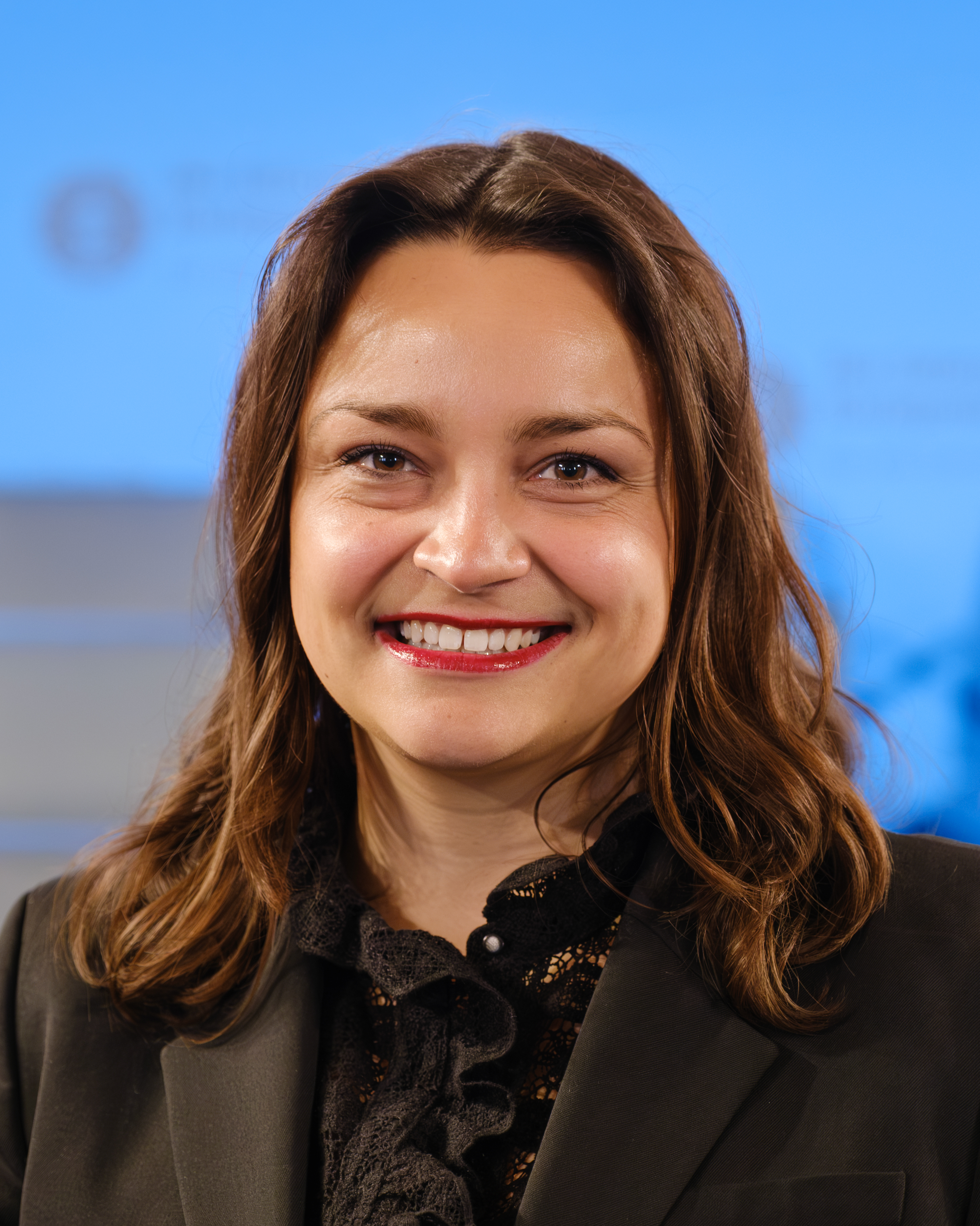

Member of the Bundestag
- Incumbent
- Assumed office 26 October 2021
- Constituency: Aachen II

Personal details
- Born: Catarina dos Santos Firnhaber; 8 July 1994 (age 32) Lisbon, Portugal
- Citizenship: Germany; Portugal
- Party: Christian Democratic Union (since 2014)
- Education: University of Cologne
- Occupation: Lawyer • Politician

Catarina dos Santos-Wintz (born 8 July 1994) is a German lawyer and politician of the Christian Democratic Union (CDU) who has been a member of the German Bundestag since the federal election in 2021 and was re-elected in 2025. She directly represents the Aachen II constituency (constituency 087) and is one of the youngest members in parliament.

== Early life and career ==
Catarina dos Santos was born in Lisbon in 1994 and grew up in Eschweiler (StädteRegion Aachen, Germany). After graduating from the Bischöfliche Liebfrauenschule in Eschweiler in 2012, she studied law at the University of Cologne, specializing in tax law and completed her degrees in 2017 and 2020 (German bar exam). She then worked as a lawyer at a law firm near Düsseldorf until 2023, focusing on corporate succession and foundations.

== Political career ==
=== Early beginnings ===
Dos Santos joined both the Junge Union (JU) and the Christian Democratic Union (CDU) in 2014. Within the CDU, she serves as a membership representative for CDU Aachen Land and is a member of the executive board of CDU North Rhine-Westphalia (CDU NRW). She is also a member of the Mittelstands- und Wirtschaftsunion (MIT) and the Frauen Union NRW.

From 2020, dos Santos served as deputy parliamentary group leader of the CDU parliamentary group in the Städteregionstag of StädteRegion Aachen and was also a member of the Eschweiler city council.

=== Member of the German Parliament, 2021–present ===
In the 2021 federal election, dos Santos ran as the CDU's direct candidate in the Aachen II constituency. She entered the German Bundestag via position 15 on the CDUs state list. Her first-vote result of 32.5% was the highest among all candidates who did not secure a direct mandate. In the 2025 federal election, she won 40.1% of the first votes and was directly elected to the Bundestag.

In the German Bundestag, dos Santos served as a full member of the Committee on Digital Affairs and the Committee on European Union Affairs during the 20th parliamentary term. She was also a deputy member of the Committee on Foreign Affairs, the Committee on Legal Affairs, and the Subcommittee on European Law. Additionally, she is a member of the Franco-German Parliamentary Assembly and serves as Deputy Chair of the German-Portuguese Parliamentary Group.

Since 2022, dos Santos has served as Counsel to the Diáspora Portuguesa (World Portuguese Network).

As part of the coalition negotiations after the 2025 federal election, dos Santos participated in the CDU Germany’s working group on digital affairs.
