= Würselen =

- Town
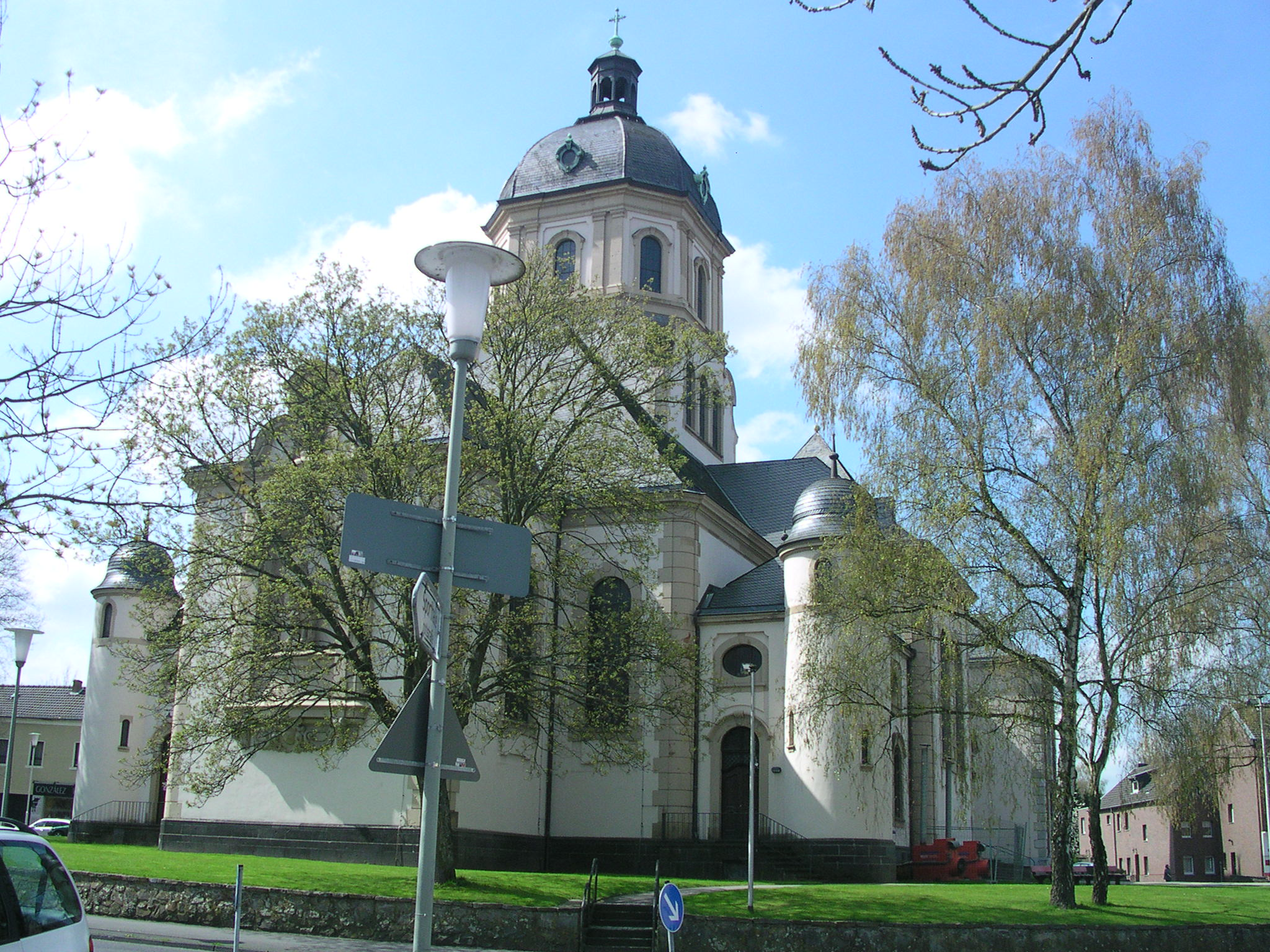
- Saint Sebastian Church

- Flag Coat of arms

- Location of Würselen within Aachen district
- Interactive map of Würselen
- Location within Germany Location within North Rhine-Westphalia
- Coordinates: 50°49′N 6°08′E
- Country: Germany
- State: North Rhine-Westphalia
- Admin. region: Köln
- District: Aachen

Government
  - Mayor (2020–25): Roger Nießen (CDU)

Area
  - Total: 34.39 km^{2} (13.28 sq mi)
- Elevation: 191 m (627 ft)

Population (2025-12-31)
  - Total: 40,249
  - Density: 1,170/km^{2} (3,031/sq mi)
- Time zone: UTC+01:00 (CET)
  - Summer (DST): UTC+02:00 (CEST)
- Postal codes: 52146
- Dialling codes: 02405
- Vehicle registration: AC
- Website: www.wuerselen.de

Würselen (German pronunciation: [ˈvʏʁzələn], Ripuarian: Wöschele [ˈβœʃələ]) is a town in the borough of Aachen, in North Rhine-Westphalia, Germany.

== Geography ==
Würselen lies north of the city of Aachen in the immediate vicinity of the tripoint of Belgium, Germany and the Netherlands. Its neighbouring settlements are, in clockwise order, the towns of Herzogenrath, Alsdorf and Eschweiler and the city of Aachen. Würselen is part of Aachen's Nordkreis quarter and is the only part of the city borough without external boundaries.

=== Subdivisions ===
As part of the administrative reform in North Rhine-Westphalia and the related 1971 Aachen Act, the territory of the borough of Würselen was expanded in 1972 to incorporate the hitherto independent municipalities of Bardenberg and Broichweiden. Since then Würselen has consisted of the following quarters:

- Bardenberg
- Broichweiden
- Würselen

These are subdivided in turn into the following parishes:

Würselen:

- Bissen
- Dobach
- Elchenrath
- Grevenberg
- Markt-Preck
- Morsbach
- Oppen-Haal
- Scherberg
- Schweilbach
- Teut-Siedlung

Broichweiden:

- Broich
- Euchen
- Linden-Neusen
- St. Jobs
- Vorweiden
- Weiden
- Wersch

Bardenberg:

- Pley
- Bardenberg

== Coat of arms ==
The coat of arms show the eagle of the coat of arms of Aachen in the topleft corner. The second quarter shows the coat of arms of the Rhine Province, however the bend also represents the river Wurm which flows through the town. The mining tools in the third quarter remember the mining history of the town, which dates back till the 12th century. The cross in the fourth quarter is the symbol of the prince-bishopric of Cologne, as the town belonged to the archdiocese of Cologne until the creation of the diocese of Aachen. On top of the Coat of arms, is a castle, built from yellowish bricks. The middle, Left and right each have a tower. It represents the castle „Burg Wilhelmstein“.

== History ==
During the time of the Roman Empire, Roman soldiers were based at Würselen, on an area today known as "Mauerfeldchen" (small mural field).

The first mention of the town was as Wormsalt in 870. Between 1265-69, Duke Wilhelm IV of Jülich built the castle of Wilhelmstein. Since 1616 the town has been known as Würselen. In 1972, the neighbouring municipalities of Bardenberg and Broichweiden were incorporated into the town.

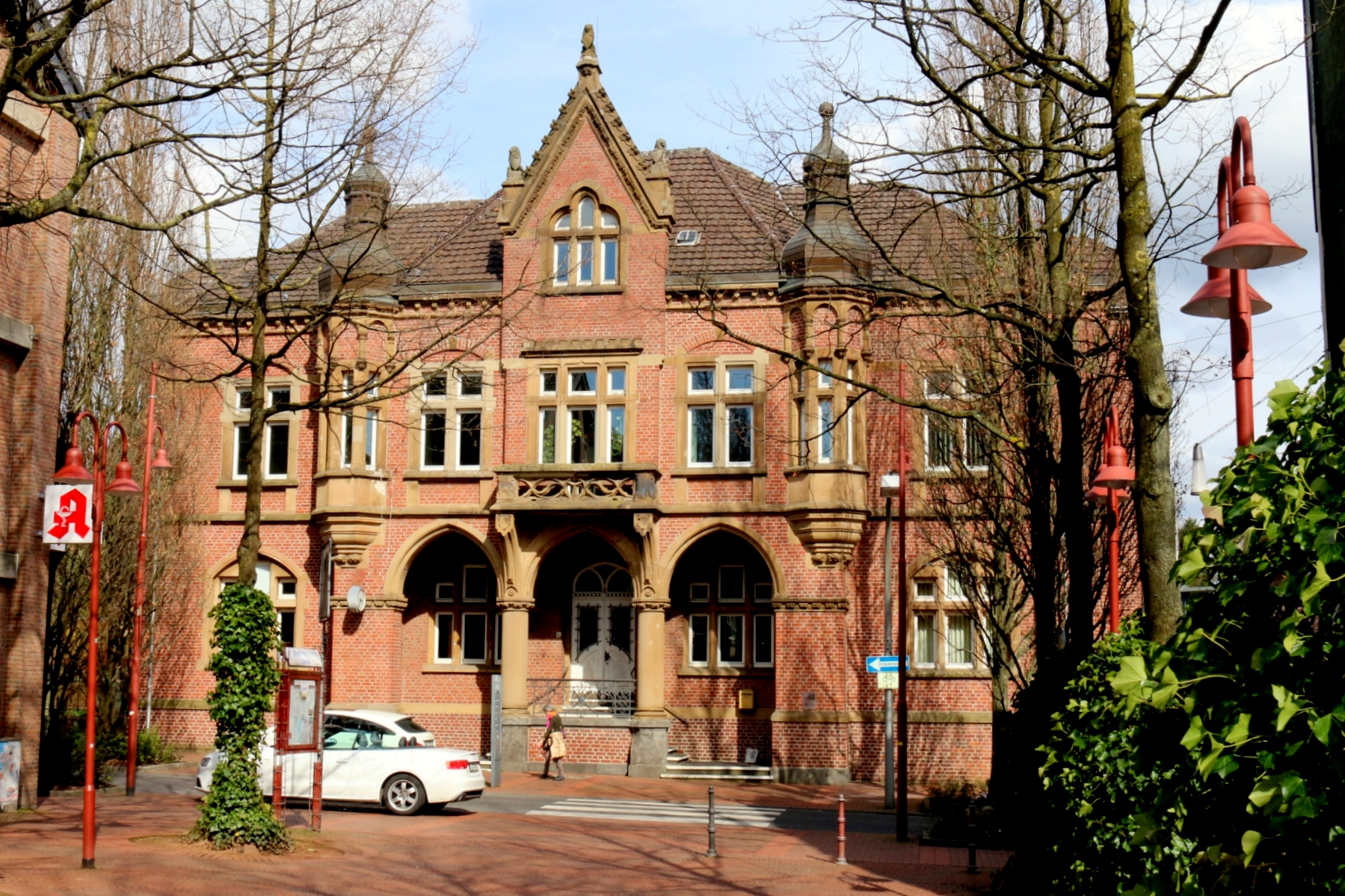
Würselen Town hall

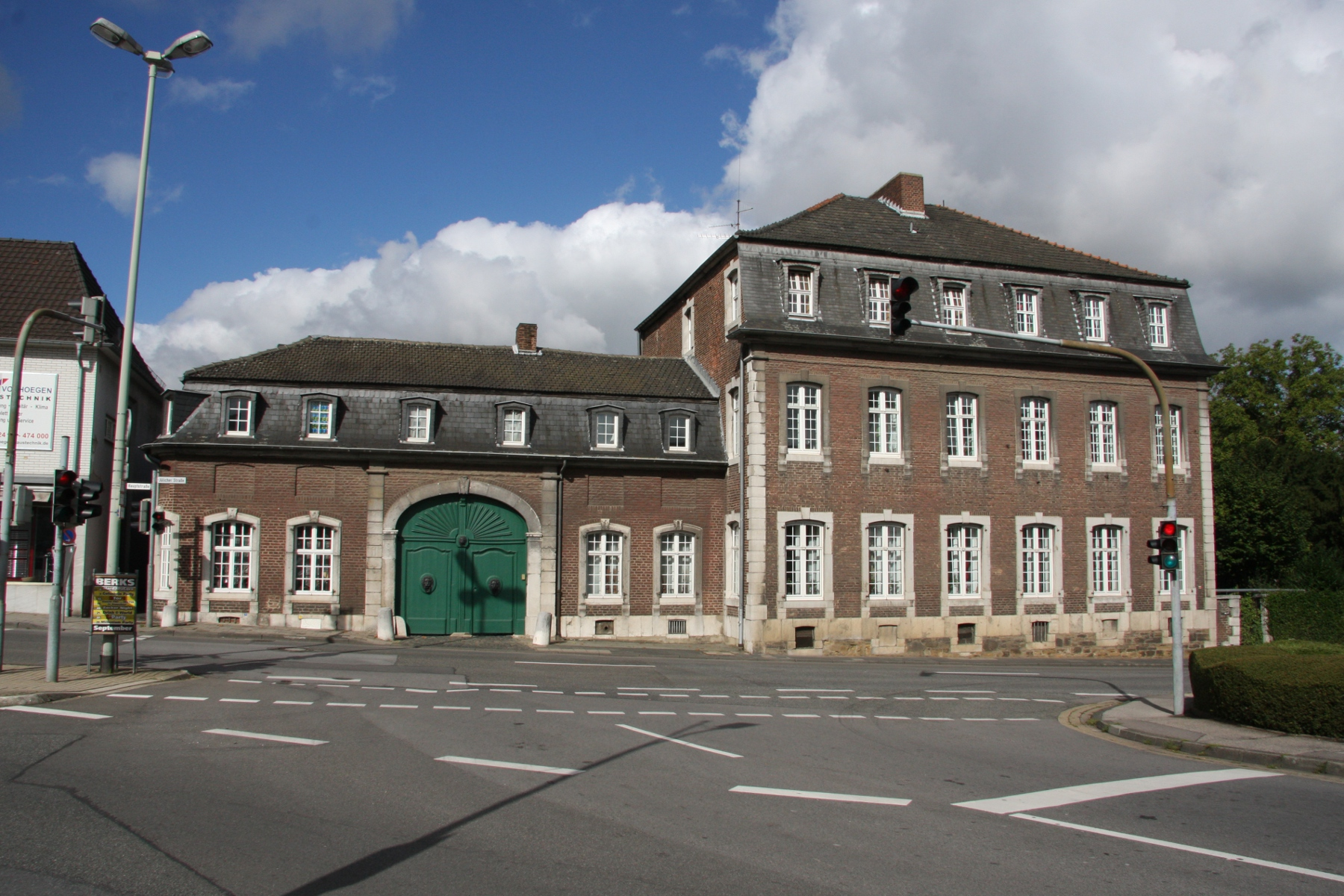
Würselen

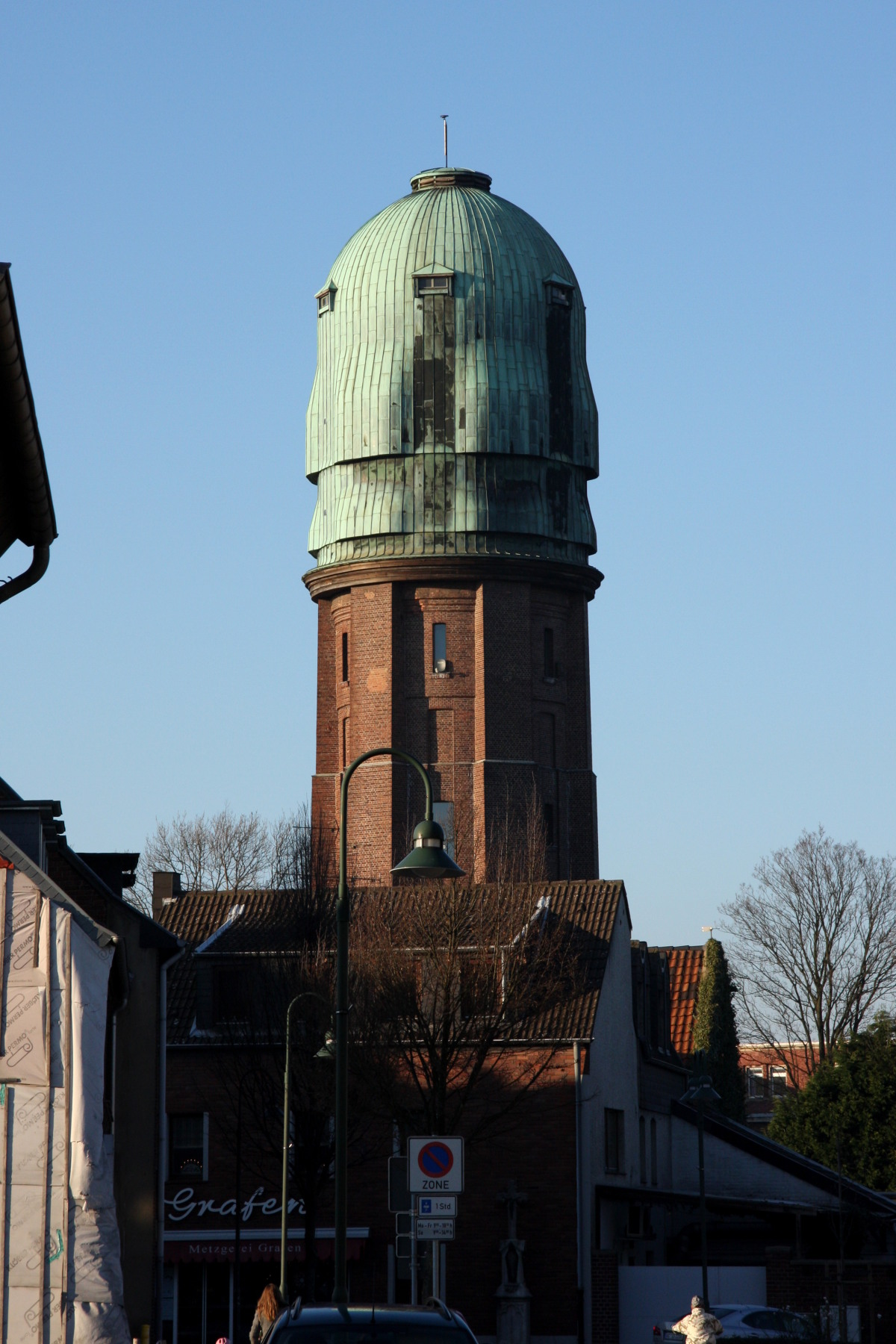
Bardenberg Water tower

== Population ==
Historical population

Year	Pop.	±% p.a.
1965	33,189	—
1970	33,213	+0.01%
1975	34,558	+0.80%
1980	34,844	+0.16%
1985	33,681	−0.68%
1990	34,406	+0.43%
1995	35,758	+0.77%

Year	Pop.	±% p.a.
2000	36,323	+0.31%
2005	37,231	+0.50%
2010	37,693	+0.25%
2015	38,962	+0.66%
2020	38,496	−0.24%
2025	40,249	+0.89%

Source: Landesdatabank Nordrhein-Westfalen

== Twin towns – sister cities ==
Würselen is twinned with:

- Hildburghausen, Germany
- Morlaix, France
- Réo, Burkina Faso
- Campagnatico, Italy
- Ruichang, China

== Notable people ==
- Jakob Dautzenberg (1897–1979), politician (KPD), resistance fighter against national socialism, Reichstag deputy
- Adolf Wamper (1901–1977), sculptor, created the Black Madonna in the War Crimes Camp 'Golden Mile'
- Jupp Derwall (1927–2007), football player and manager
- Jupp Kapellmann (born 1949), footballer
- Martin Schulz (born 1955), former leader of the Social Democratic Party of Germany, former President of the European Parliament, was Mayor of Würselen
- Nadine Capellmann (born 1965), dressage rider
- Der Graf (born 1970s), frontman and songwriter of the band Unheilig
- Roland Bartetzko (born 1970), soldier, charged with murder, attempted murder and terrorism
- Torsten Frings (born 1976), footballer
- Norman Langen (born 1985), percussionist
- Yannick Gerhardt (born 1994), footballer
- Achim Großmann (1947-2023), politician

== Gallery ==
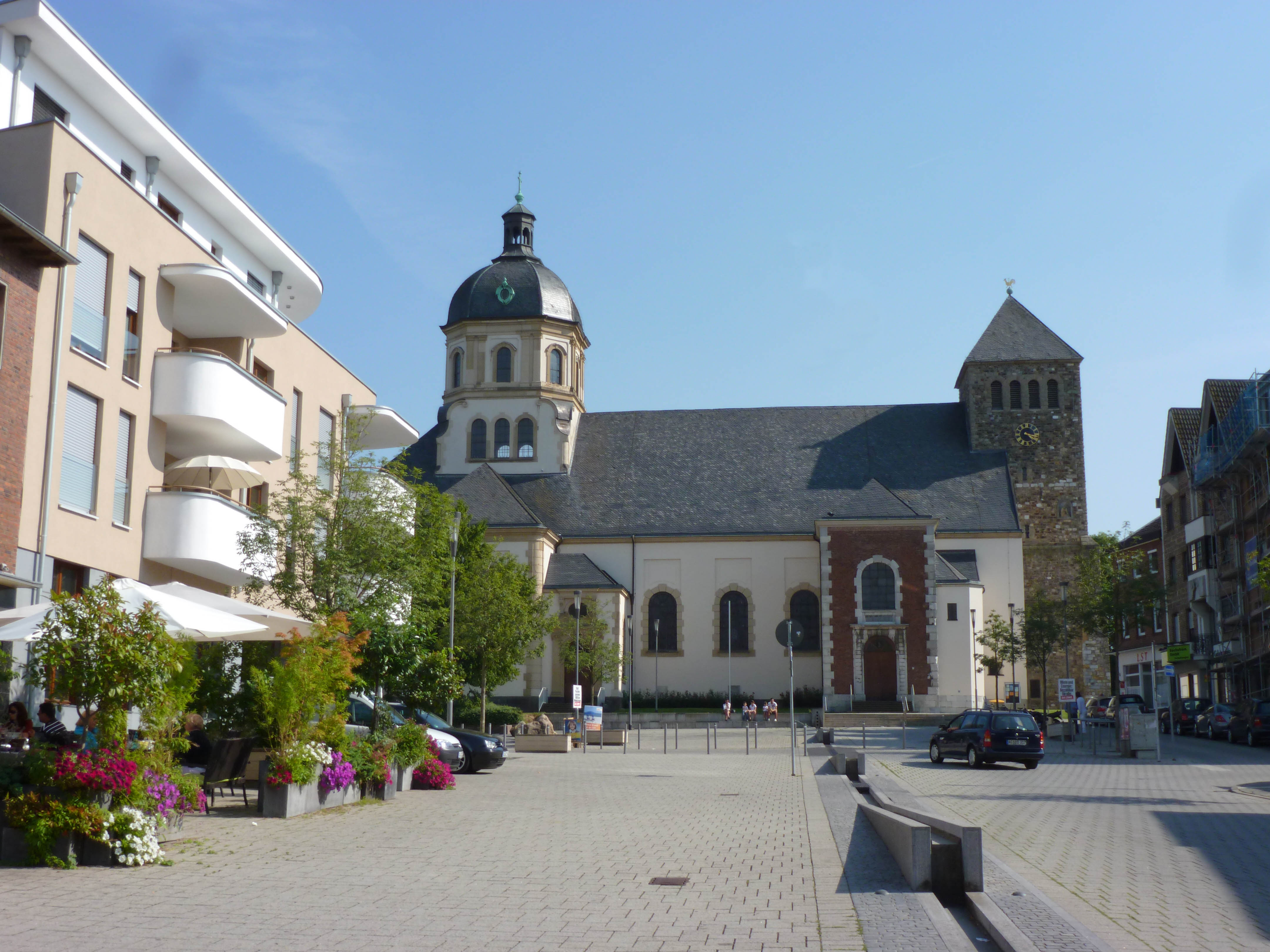
View from the Market towards St Sebastian

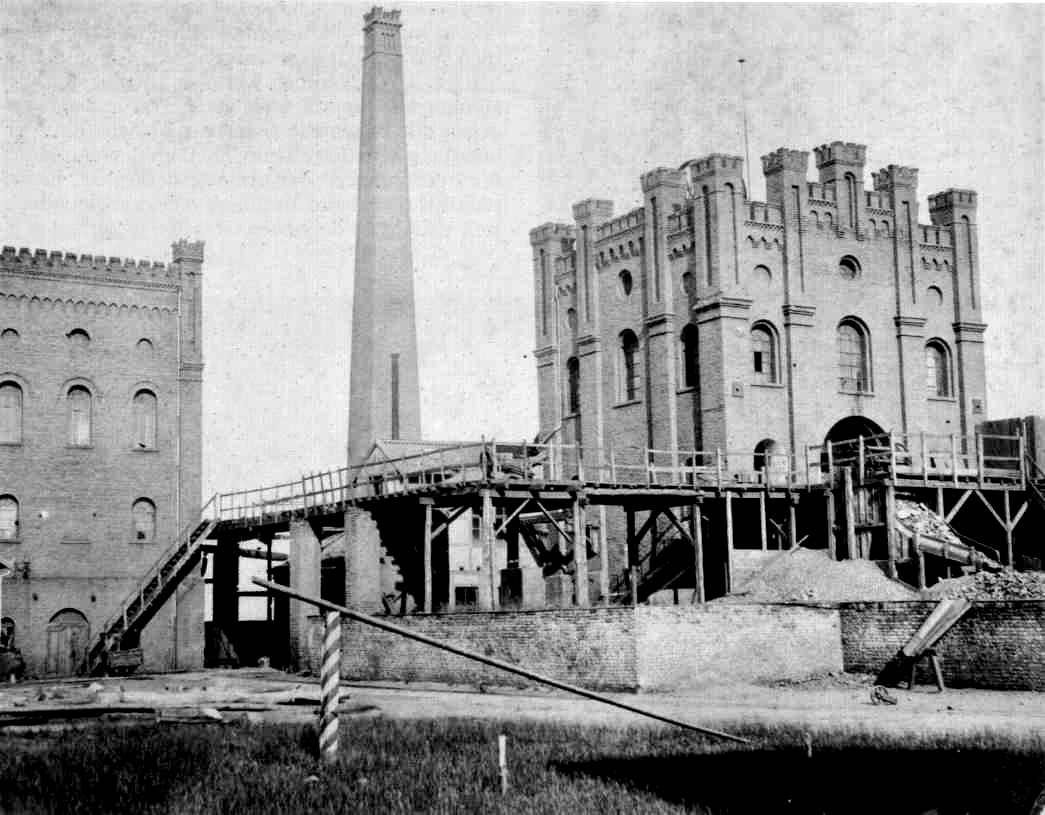
The former mine Teut with its Malakoff tower in 1880

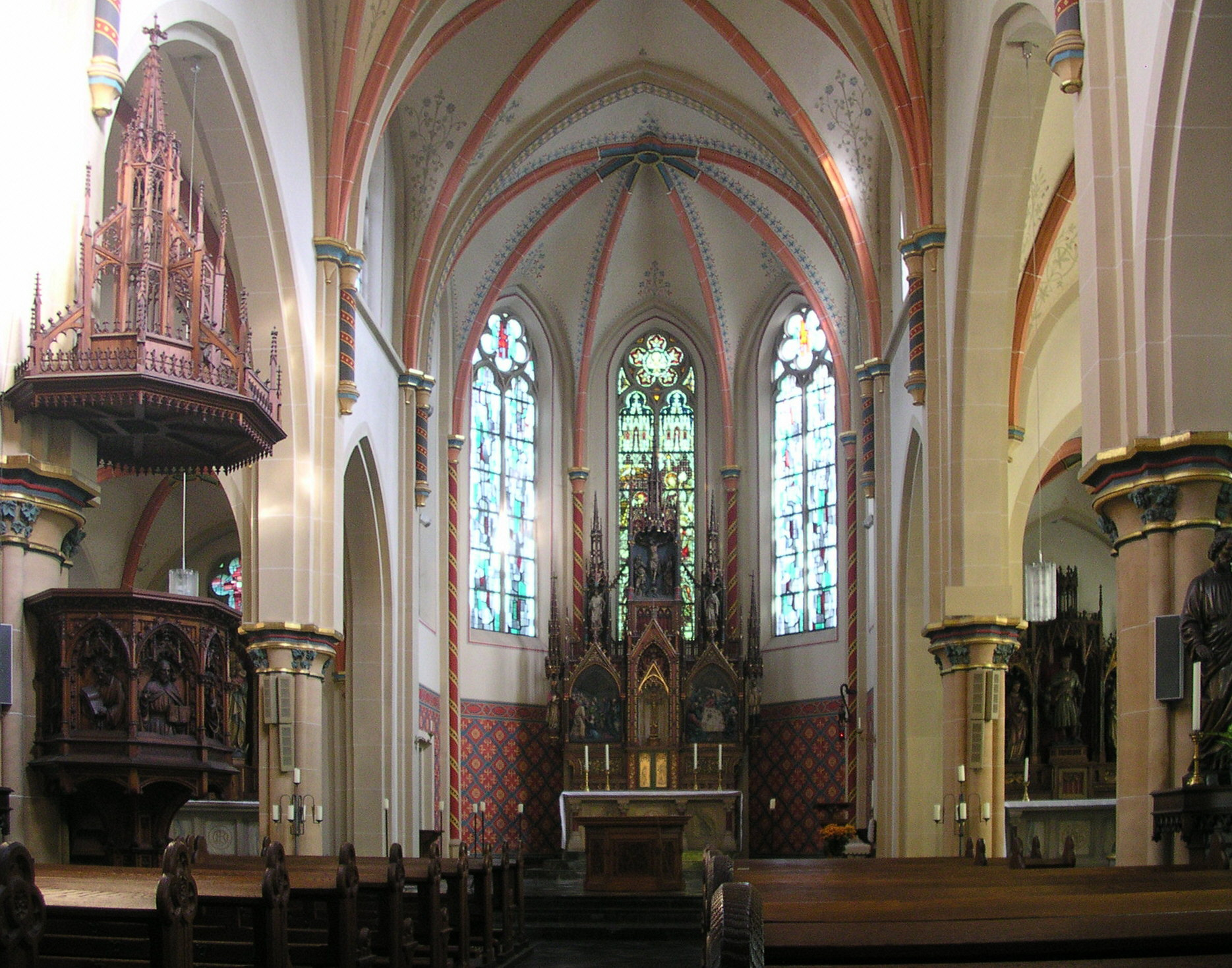
Church of St Nicolas

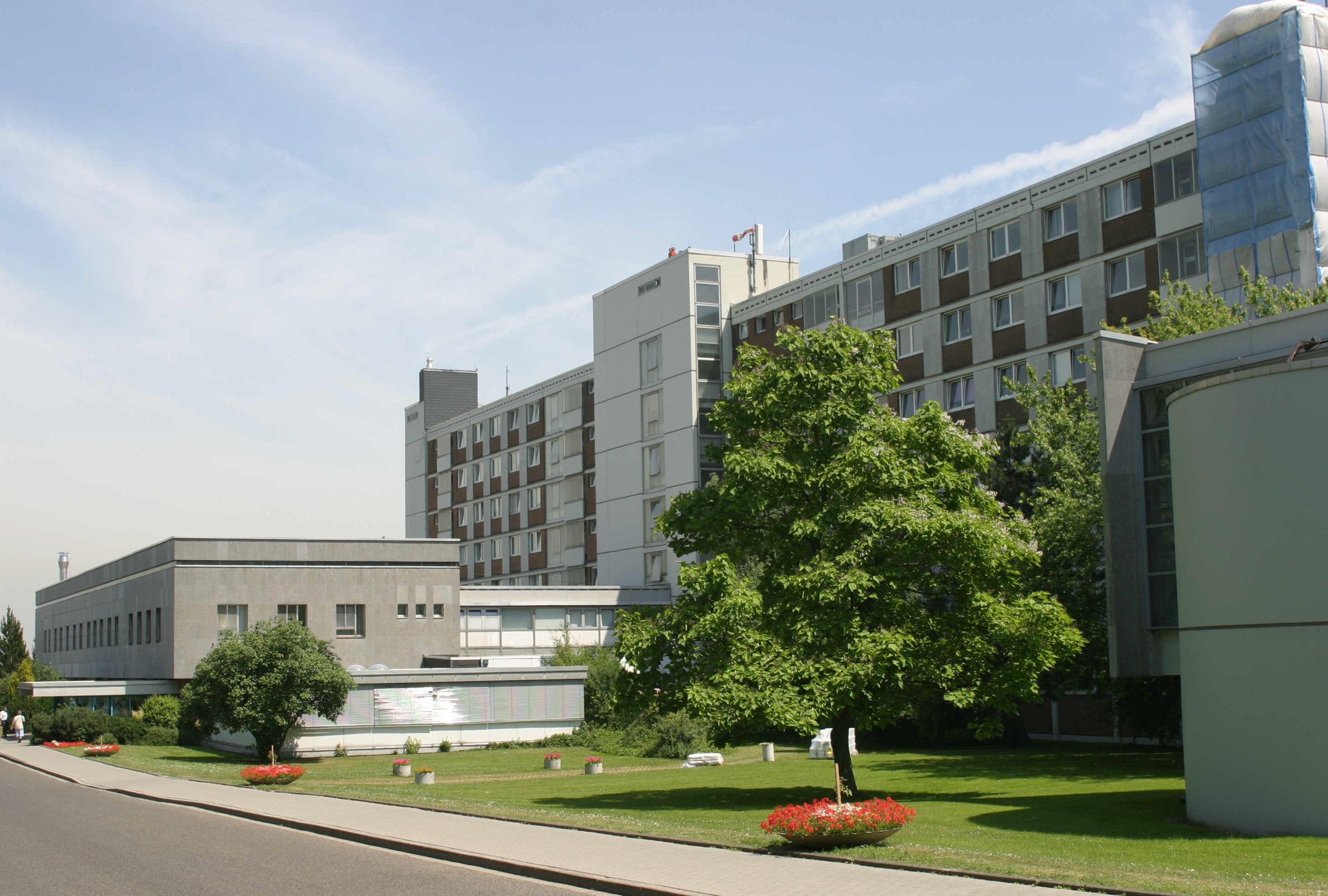
Marienhoehe Hospital
