= Thomas Grossmann =

German psychologist (born 1951)

Thomas Grossmann (born 1 June 1951 in Hamburg, West Germany) is a German psychologist, psychotherapist and author.

== Education ==
Grossmann studied psychology and economics at the University of Hamburg and since then focussed his writing on LGBT topics: He is primarily known for his book title Schwul - na und? (translated: Gay - so what?), which was originally published by Rowohlt-Verlag in 1981. As it was the first guide for gay people on coming out in Germany, it became so popular that revised editions were printed in 1991 and 1994.

In 1986 Grossmann released his second book Beziehungsweise andersrum. schwul – und dann? (translated: Or rather the other way. gay - and then?). It aims at giving advice to homosexuals regarding their social environment and their partnership in particular.

Two years later, he titled his third book Eine Liebe wie jede andere. Mit homosexuellen Jugendlichen leben und umgehen (translated: A love like any other. Living with gay youths and deal). It addresses the question how parents should deal with the homosexuality of their children. Respective problems of gay and lesbian adolescents are openly discussed and explained.

In 2000, Grossman earned his PhD from Gunter Schmidt for his dissertation on pre-homosexual childhoods.

== Personal life ==
Grossmann has been an activist for LGBT rights since the 1970s.

== Works as author ==
- Schwul – na und?. Rororo Sachbuch 2002, ISBN 3-499-19109-1.
- Beziehungsweise andersrum. schwul – und dann?. Rororo Sachbuch 1986, ISBN 3-499-15884-1.
- Eine Liebe wie jede andere. Mit homosexuellen Jugendlichen leben und umgehen. Rororo Sachbuch 1988, ISBN 3-499-18451-6. - A guideline for parents of LGBT people
- Prä-homosexuelle Kindheiten: eine empirische Untersuchung über Geschlechtsrollenkonformität und -nonkonformität bei homosexuellen Männern in Kindheit, Jugend und Erwachsenenalter, Thesis University of Hamburg 2000, DNB 959194606/DNB 959393994 (electronic version, online)
