= Yeshiva Gedolah of Los Angeles =

Religious school in Los Angeles, California, United States

Coordinates: 34.0569°N 118.3489°W

Information
- Established: 1978; 48 years ago
- Rosh Hayeshiva: Rabbi Eliezer Gross
- Website: ygla.org

Yeshiva Gedolah of Los Angeles (YGLA), is a Haredi Jewish high school located in the Fairfax District, Los Angeles. It was established in 1978.

The current dean and Rosh Hayeshiva is Rabbi Eliezer Gross. The executive director and administrator is Rabbi Yossi Gross, one of the Rosh Hayeshiva's sons. Rabbi Aron Tzvi Gross, another son of the Rosh Hayeshiva, serves as the Judaic Principal; Rabbi Shmuel Manne is the dean of students; and the school's secular studies principal is Dr. Debora Parks. The school also operates a Beis Medrash Program for two years, starting in 12th grade and continuing for a year afterwards (the "13th Year"), led by Rabbi Aron Tzvi Gross and Rabbi Aron Gettinger.

The hashkafa, or theological leaning of the Yeshiva, is very much aligned with the Litvish stream of Haredi Judaism. YGLA is best known within the wider Haredi, Yeshivish community for emphasizing its intense Talmud program, with mandatory morning, afternoon, and night seders. The first two parts are classes and the third is chavrusa learning, a traditional rabbinic approach to Talmudic study in which a small group of students (usually 2–5) analyze, discuss, and debate a shared text.

Since its recent change in administration, the secular studies program is now under the current leadership of Dr. Debora Parks. The Principal's most important goals are maintaining the Yeshiva's standing in the Western Association of Schools and Colleges (WASC), and making certain that the secular curriculum meets the California state requirements for a high school diploma.
