= Ernst A. F. W. Grossmann =

Ernst August Friedrich Wilhelm Grossmann (16 February 1863 – 17 March 1933) was a German astronomer who worked at the observatories of Göttingen, Vienna, Kiel and Munich. He identified systematic errors in calculation of angles due to atmospheric refraction and introduced a correction constant.

Grossman was born in Rothenburg, near Bremen and went to study at the University of Göttingen in 1884 and received a PhD in 1891 with a thesis on Untersuchung über systematische Fehler bei Doppelsternbeobachtungen ausgeführt in Verbindung mit einer Bahnbestimmung des Doppelsterns (Investigation of systematic errors in double star observations carried out in connection with an orbit determination of the double star η̳ Coronae borealis in Munich) under Adolph Schur and Leopold Ambronn. He then worked as an assistant at the Göttingen observatory until 1896 when he moved to Vienna working with Moritz Kuffner. He moved to Leipzig in 1898 and to Kiel in 1902. He moved to Munich in 1905 where he worked until his retirement in 1928. Grossmann's major work was in accurate computation and observation. He detected systematic error and found the refraction caused by the atmosphere and came up with the correction constant for the atmosphere.
