= Victor Grossman =

American publicist and author (1928–2025)

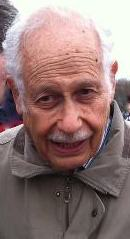
- Grossman visiting Buchenwald, 2013
- Born: Stephen Wechsler; March 11, 1928; New York City, U.S.
- Died: December 17, 2025 (aged 97); Berlin, Germany
- Education: Harvard University; Karl Marx University
- Occupation: Author
- Spouse: Renate Kschiner (m. 1955)
- Website: www.victorgrossman.com

Victor Grossman (born Stephen Wechsler; March 11, 1928 – December 17, 2025) was an American publicist and author who defected to the Soviet Union in 1952. He studied journalism in East Germany, and remained there working as a journalist and writer.

== Early life ==
When I was eight [I was asked who was the best candidate in the upcoming 1936 Presidential election]. Maybe Roosevelt, I answered. [The adults at Free Acres retorted:] "You mean back a man who helped big business weather the Depression and who pushed through the AAA, so hogs are slaughtered, wheat burned, and milk poured into the river to raise prices high while people go hungry?" "But wouldn't Landon be worse?" "If people always choose the lesser of two evils, evil will always be with us"

— Victor Grossman. Crossing the River, p.14

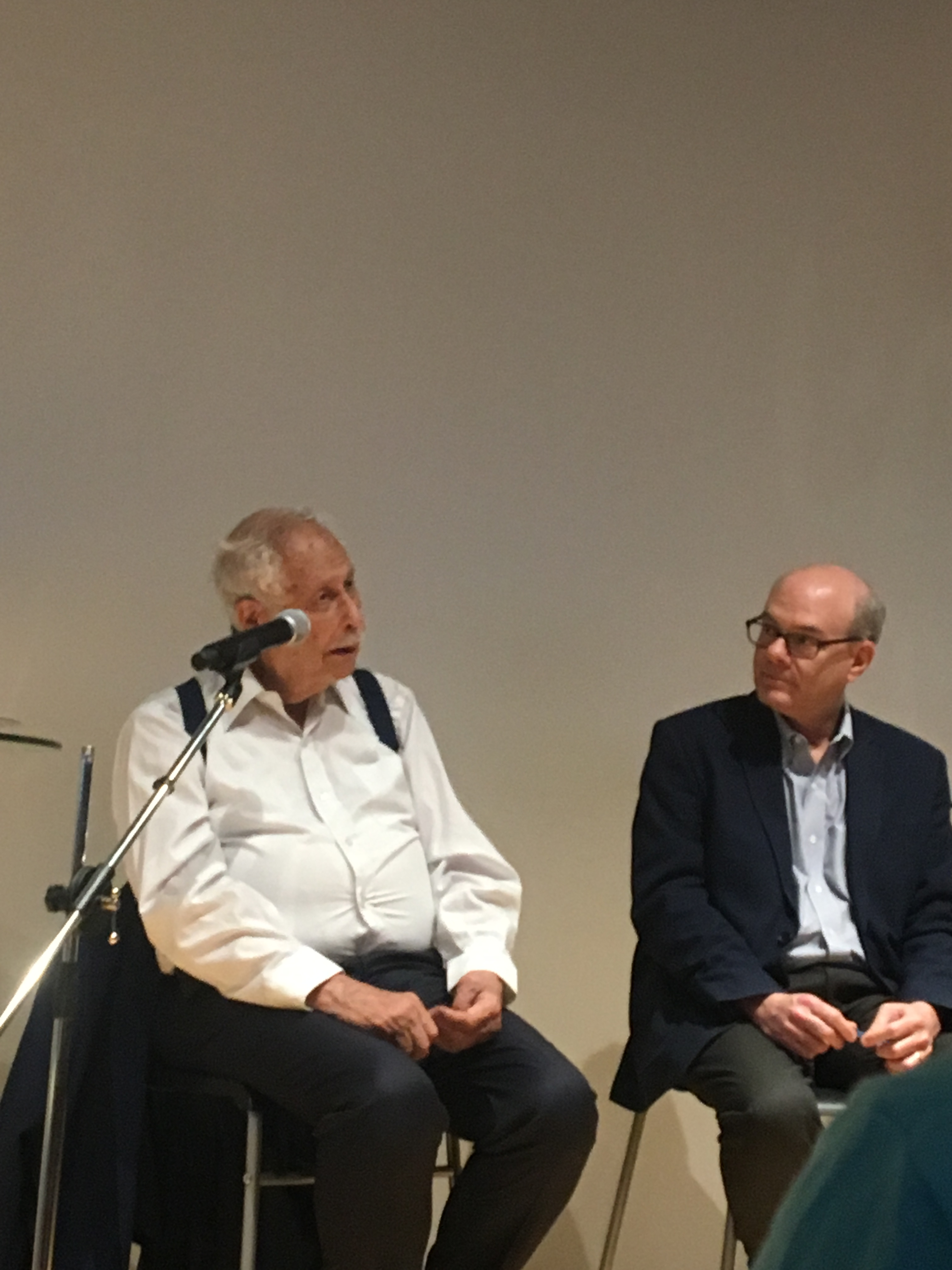
Grossman speaking at the Goethe-Institut in Washington, D.C. in 2019, shortly after the release of A Socialist Defector

Grossman was born Stephen Wechsler in New York City on March 11, 1928. His parents were an art dealer and librarian who had fled antisemitic pogroms in the Russian Empire. Growing up, his family moved often due to the Great Depression. He joined the Young Communist League in 1942, while in high school. As a youth, his family often summered in Free Acres, New Jersey, a community using economic philosopher Henry George's concept of single taxation. He spent two years each at the Dalton and Fieldston Schools. Grossman joined the Communist Party USA in 1945 while studying at Harvard University. Over the course of his education, he joined a variety of other leftist groups, including the Joint Anti-Fascist Refugee Appeal and the Southern Negro Youth Congress. He graduated from the university with a degree in economics in 1949. After receiving his degree, he worked in an factory in Buffalo, New York in order to spread communism to other workers. However, in 1950, Grossman was drafted into the United States Army and stationed in Bavaria, West Germany.

== Defection and life in East Germany ==
In 1952, while serving in Austria, Grossman swam across the Danube into the Soviet-occupied zone of Austria, and became one of a handful of soldiers from the NATO nations who defected to the Eastern Bloc. Grossman later stated he defected because he feared prosecution by U.S. authorities under the McCarran Act for not declaring his membership in left-wing political organizations prior to his entering the army; shortly before his defection, he had been ordered to report to a military judge.

Grossman was initially held for two weeks for assessment by Soviet authorities in Baden bei Wien. He was then sent to Potsdam, East Germany (GDR), where he reluctantly adopted the name "Victor Grossman" in order to protect his family at home. After two months, he was transferred to Bautzen, where western defectors were being held by the Soviet authorities. In Bautzen, he was assigned a job at a train car building firm.

In 1954, he received an offer to continue his studies in journalism at Karl Marx University. After graduating, he worked as an editor at the Berlin book publisher Seven Seas for four months. From 1959 to 1963, Grossman worked for the German Democratic Report, an English digest of GDR press which paid particular attention to ex-Nazis working in the West German government. He then worked as the North America editor at Radio Berlin International until 1965. He worked as the director of the Paul Robeson Archive at the Academy of Arts for the next three years. Following 1968, he began working as a freelance journalist. While in East Germany, Grossman was a good friend of his fellow US exile, the singer and actor Dean Reed. In 1954, Grossman was recruited as an informant by the East German Ministry of State Security (MfS, or "Stasi"), codename TAUCHER ("Diver").

Grossman never renounced his U.S. citizenship or became an East German citizen, and returned to the U.S. for the first time in 1994. He was discharged from the Army, but received no jail time and was able to reclaim his U.S. passport. He would return to America several times, including on a book tour to promote his memoirs Crossing the River: A Memoir of the American Left, the Cold War, and Life in East Germany, (2003) and A Socialist Defector: from Harvard to Karl-Marx-Allee (2019). Grossman was a frequent contributor to the Marxist magazine Monthly Review. A critic of reunification, he later joined the German Party of Democratic Socialism and Die Linke and maintained an email newsletter, Berlin Dispatches, from 2017 until his death.

== Death ==
Grossman died in Berlin on December 17, 2025, at the age of 97.

== Personal life ==
Grossman met Renate Kschiner while staying in Bautzen, and the pair moved to Leipzig together after Grossman was accepted to Karl Marx University. The two married in 1955 and raised two sons, Thomas and Timothy.

== Selected works ==
- Nilpferd und Storch. Kinderbuchverlag Berlin, Berlin, 1965
- Von Manhattan bis Kalifornien. Aus der Geschichte der USA. Kinderbuchverlag, Berlin 1974
- Per Anhalter durch die USA. Berlin 1976
- Der Weg über die Grenze. Verlag Neues Leben, Berlin, 1985
- If I Had a Song – Lieder und Sänger der USA. Lied der Zeit, Berlin, 1988, ISBN 3-7332-0023-3
- Crossing the River: A Memoir of the American Left, the Cold War, and Life in East Germany. University of Massachusetts Press, Amherst, Boston, 2003, ISBN 1-55849-385-9
- Madrid, du Wunderbare. Ein Amerikaner blättert in der Geschichte des Spanienkrieges. GNN-Verlag, Schkeuditz, 2006, ISBN 978-3-89819-235-4
- Ein Ami blickt auf die DDR zurück, Spotless, Berlin, 2011, ISBN 978-3-360-02039-0
- Rebel Girls: 34 amerikanische Frauen im Porträt, Papyrossa, 2012, ISBN 978-3-89438-501-9
- A Socialist Defector: From Harvard to Karl-Marx-Allee, Monthly Review Press, 2019, ISBN 978-1-58367-738-4
