= Franz Mühlenberg =

German politician (1894–1976)

Member of the Bundestag
- In office 7 September 1949 – 15 October 1961

Personal details
- Born: 19 May 1894
- Died: 16 February 1976 (aged 81)
- Party: CDU

Franz Mühlenberg (May 19, 1894 – February 16, 1976) was a German politician of the Christian Democratic Union (CDU) and former member of the German Bundestag.

== Life ==
He was a member of the German Bundestag from its first election in 1949 to 1961. He represented the constituency of Aachen-Land in parliament.

== Literature ==
Herbst, Ludolf; Jahn, Bruno (2002). Vierhaus, Rudolf (ed.). Biographisches Handbuch der Mitglieder des Deutschen Bundestages. 1949–2002 [Biographical Handbook of the Members of the German Bundestag. 1949–2002] (in German). München: De Gruyter - De Gruyter Saur. p. 1715. ISBN 978-3-11-184511-1.
