= Achim Großmann =

German politician

Achim Großmann (April 17, 1947, in Aachen – April 14, 2023, in Würselen ) was a German politician (SPD). From 1998 to 2009 he was Parliamentary State Secretary to the Federal Minister for Transport, Construction and Housing and from 2005 Federal Minister for Transport, Construction and Urban Development.

== Life and career ==
After graduating from high school in 1966 at the Kaiser-Karls-Gymnasium in Aachen, Großmann studied psychology at the TH Aachen, which he completed in 1972 with a diploma in psychology. He then worked as an educational consultant at the advice center for parents, children and young people in Alsdorf until 1986, and as its director since 1979. At the same time, he worked for several semesters as a lecturer in administrative psychology at the University of Applied Sciences for Public Administration in Aachen.

Achim Großmann was divorced and had two children.

== Public offices ==
From 1975 to 1998, Großmann was a councilor for the city of Würselen.

After the 1998 federal election, he was appointed Parliamentary State Secretary to the Federal Minister for Transport, Construction and Housing in the Government led by Gerhard Schröder. After the formation of the Grand Coalition under Chancellor Angela Merkel, the ministry was renamed the Federal Ministry of Transport, Building and Urban Development. After the 2009 federal election and the subsequent change in government, Großmann left office in October 2009. In his eleven years in office, he served under five different construction and transport ministers.

As Parliamentary State Secretary, Achim Großmann was a member of the supervisory board of Deutsche Bahn and was involved in the preparations for the IPO.
