= David Grossman (music executive) =

American music executive and author

- Born: c. 1957; Rochester, New York, U.S.
- Education: Berklee College of Music (B.M., 1979); Pepperdine University (M.B.A.)
- Occupations: Music executive, music supervisor, author
- Known for: Senior Vice President of Television Music at Paramount Pictures; Executive Vice President of The Recording Academy

David Grossman (born c. 1957) is an American music executive and author. He served as Senior Vice President of Television Music at Paramount Pictures Television Group for approximately 16 years, overseeing music for television productions that earned nine Primetime Emmy Awards, and subsequently as Executive Vice President of The Recording Academy.

== Early life and education ==
Grossman was born in Rochester, New York. He began performing at age 17 as a drummer with the international performing arts group Up with People. He attended the Berklee College of Music, graduating with a degree in music composition in 1979, and later earned a Master of Business Administration from Pepperdine University. He received the Distinguished Alumni Award from Berklee College of Music.

== Career ==
=== Paramount Pictures ===
After graduating from Berklee, Grossman worked as a freelance drummer and percussionist in Los Angeles before transitioning into music management for the television industry. He joined the music division of Paramount Pictures Television Group, where he served as Senior Vice President of Television Music for approximately 16 years. In that role he oversaw music production and licensing for television productions including Star Trek: The Next Generation, Frasier, Cheers, and Entertainment Tonight. Productions under his supervision earned nine Primetime Emmy Awards and more than 30 nominations during his tenure. A 2000 cover story in Film Music magazine featured him discussing the direction of television music licensing and production. In 2002, Variety reported his promotion to Senior Vice President within the studio's music division.

=== The Recording Academy ===
In March 2006, Grossman was appointed Executive Vice President of The Recording Academy, reporting to President Neil Portnow. In the role he managed business development, artist relations, and long-range planning for the organization. He also served on the board of Mr. Holland's Opus Foundation, a nonprofit supporting music education in underfunded schools.

=== Arts administration and teaching ===
In April 2011, Grossman was appointed executive director of the Santa Barbara Symphony, following a nationwide search. The symphony received a four-star rating from Charity Navigator during his tenure. He resigned from the position in October 2014. In 2016, he was appointed Director of Community Engagement for the Santa Barbara Center for the Performing Arts. He is a faculty member at Santa Barbara City College, where he teaches a course on the business of music.

== Publications ==
- You Can Make It In Music: Think Your Way to 140+ Music Careers (2024). ISBN 979-8218369064
