= Alsdorf =

- Town
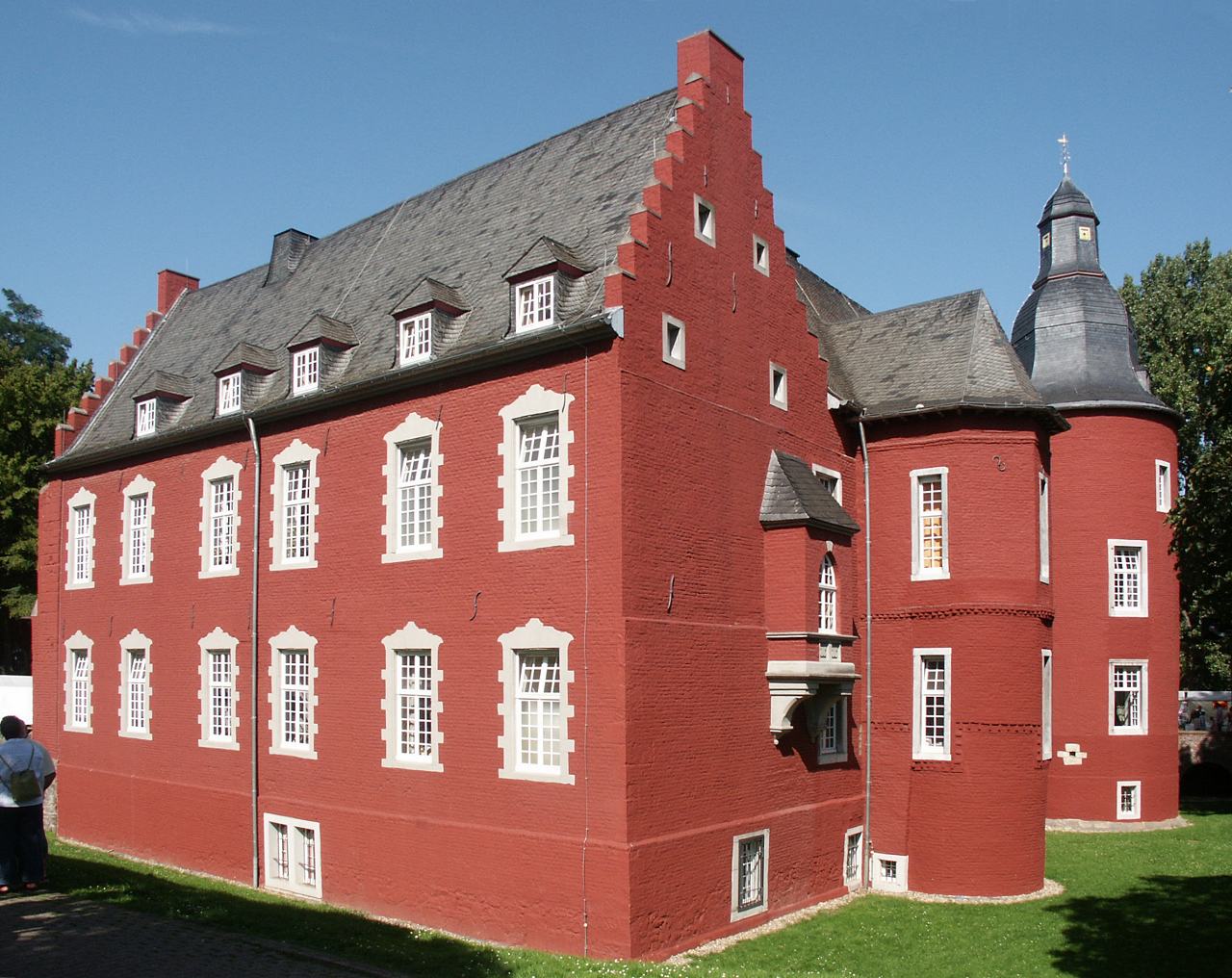
- Alsdorf Castle

- Coat of arms

- Location of Alsdorf within Aachen district
- Interactive map of Alsdorf
- Location within Germany Location within North Rhine-Westphalia
- Coordinates: 50°53′N 6°10′E
- Country: Germany
- State: North Rhine-Westphalia
- Admin. region: Köln
- District: Aachen
- Subdivisions: 16

Government
  - Mayor (2025–30): Tim Krämer (SPD)

Area
  - Total: 31.68 km^{2} (12.23 sq mi)
- Elevation: 163 m (535 ft)

Population (2025-12-31)
  - Total: 48,893
  - Density: 1,543/km^{2} (3,997/sq mi)
- Time zone: UTC+01:00 (CET)
  - Summer (DST): UTC+02:00 (CEST)
- Postal codes: 52477
- Dialling codes: 02404
- Vehicle registration: AC
- Website: www.alsdorf.de

Alsdorf in AC (2009)

Alsdorf (German pronunciation: [ˈalsdɔʁf]) is a municipality in the district of Aachen, in North Rhine-Westphalia, Germany. Until the 21st century Alsdorf was a mining area, but now many service companies have established themselves in Alsdorf. Alsdorf has an indoor arena, a cinema, a mining museum and a zoo. One of Alsdorf's famous sights is the old Castle.

== Geography ==
Alsdorf is located near the border triangle Germany/Belgium/Netherlands in the west of Germany. Communes bordering Alsdorf are Baesweiler, Aldenhoven, Eschweiler, Würselen, Herzogenrath and Übach-Palenberg. Alsdorf belongs to the district of Aachen.

=== Districts ===
Alsdorf is divided in 17 districts:

- Alsdorf-Mitte
- Begau
- Bettendorf
- Blumenrath
- Broicher Siedlung
- Busch
- Duffesheide
- Hoengen
- Kellersberg
- Mariadorf
- Neuweiler
- Ofden
- Schaufenberg
- Schleibach
- Siedlung Ost
- Warden
- Zopp

=== Waters ===
- Begauer stream
- Broicher stream
- Hoengener stream
- Merzstream
- Schaufenberger stream
- Siefengraben
- Euchener stream
- Alsdorf pond
- Mariadorf pond

== History ==
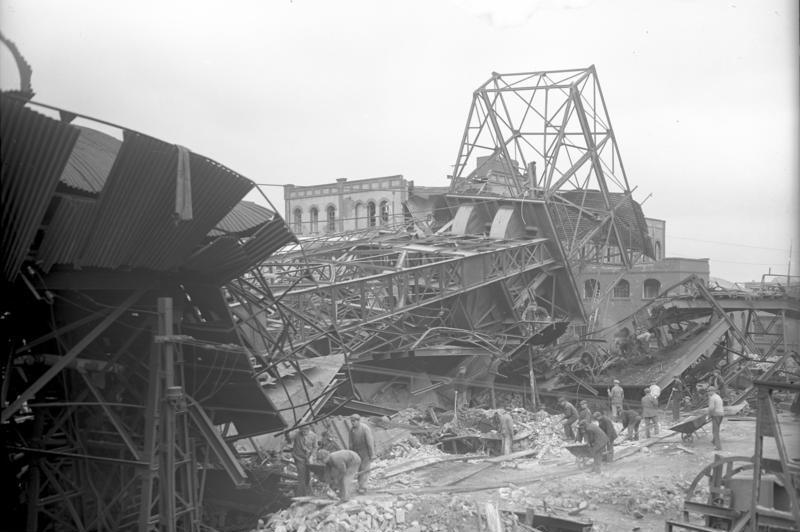
Bundesarchiv Bild 102-10600, Alsdorf, Grubenunglück

Today´s city of Alsdorf is a complex mixture of very different ingredients. A part of today's city was a part of the Duchy of Limburg (later united with Duchy of Brabant); and one part belonged to the territory of the Duchy of Jülich.

In addition, Alsdorf consists of ancient settlements whose history dates back to medieval times, as well as settlements that arose because of the long coal mining tradition in Alsdorf. The old settlements are: Alsdorf, Bettendorf, Hoengen, Ofden, Schaufenberg, Warden and Zopp.

The name Alsdorf was mentioned for the first time in a document of the Catholic Church in the year 1191. But it might be much older than 800 years. During its history, Alsdorf changed its affiliation a few times. Along with the duchy of Brabant and the duchy of Limburg, it also belonged to the duchy of Burgundy (1430) and fell to the Habsburgs in 1482. Then in 1555, it became part of the Spanish Netherlands under the Spanish Habsburgs. In 1714, it was returned to the Austrian Habsburgs until the French invasion of 1794. Pursuant to a judgement of the 1815 Congress of Vienna, Alsdorf was awarded to Prussia.

With the reconstruction of Germany after the Second World War, Prussia was eliminated, and its western provinces are now the state of North Rhine-Westphalia, where Alsdorf lies.

Until the middle of the 19th century, farming was the main industry. Only Alsdorf (approximately 1,200) and Hoengen (about 1,400) had more than 1,000 inhabitants. Population in the greater area of today's Alsdorf totalled 4,000 people.

Today the population is more than ten times larger as a result of mining, which came to Alsdorf in the middle of the 19th century. The mining industry needed many workers. First, it was possible to cover the demand with local workers but as the mine grew, the need for workers grew. To be an attractive employer, the mine company built new houses to offer its employees good working conditions. Between 1860 and 1960, a few bigger and smaller villages were founded. These villages are: Begau, Blumenrath, Broicher Siedlung, Busch, Kellersberg, Mariadorf, Neuweiler, Ofden, Ost and Zopp. In 1932, the villages Kellerberg, Ofden, Schaufenberg, and Neuweiler were incorporated and the population grew from 11,500 to 19,711.

The great tragedy on October 21, 1930, demonstrated the danger of mine work. In the Anna II Mine, 270 men and one woman were killed. It was the second largest mining accident in Germany history.

The Maria Mine closed in September 1962, and the last mine in Alsdorf shut down in 1992. Since this time, Alsdorf has successfully changed its image away from a coal city to a modern business location. A few business parks have been founded, where a lot of companies have located.

== Population ==
Historical population

Year	Pop.	±% p.a.
1965	49,942	—
1970	48,953	−0.40%
1975	47,457	−0.62%
1980	46,367	−0.46%
1985	45,900	−0.20%
1990	46,935	+0.45%
1995	46,147	−0.34%

Year	Pop.	±% p.a.
2000	46,087	−0.03%
2005	46,472	+0.17%
2010	45,522	−0.41%
2015	46,880	+0.59%
2020	47,330	+0.19%
2025	48,893	+0.65%

Source: Landesdatabank Nordrhein-Westfalen

== Politics ==
The current mayor is Tim Krämer (SPD), who was elected with 51.6% of the votes during the 2025 local elections.

=== Council ===
The situation in Alsdorf's council after the last election in 2025:

Party	Votes	%	+/-	Seats	+/-
Social Democratic Party (SPD)	5,888	31.4	▼17.4	13	▼6
Christian Democratic Union (CDU)	4,967	26.5	▼0.4	11	▲1
Alternative for Germany (AfD)	3,686	19.7	▲10.4	8	▲4
Free Citizens Representation Alpen (FBA)	2,165	11.5	New	5	New
Alliance 90/The Greens (Grüne)	958	5.1	▼6.5	2	▼2
The Left (Die Linke)	698	3.7	New	2	New
Free Democratic Party (FDP)	398	2.1	▼1.4	1	±0
Valid votes	18,760	99.1			
Invalid votes	164	0.9			
Total	18,924	100.0		42	▲4
Electorate/voter turnout	35,366	53.5			
Source: City of Alsdorf

== Culture and Sights ==
=== Alsdorf (downtown) ===
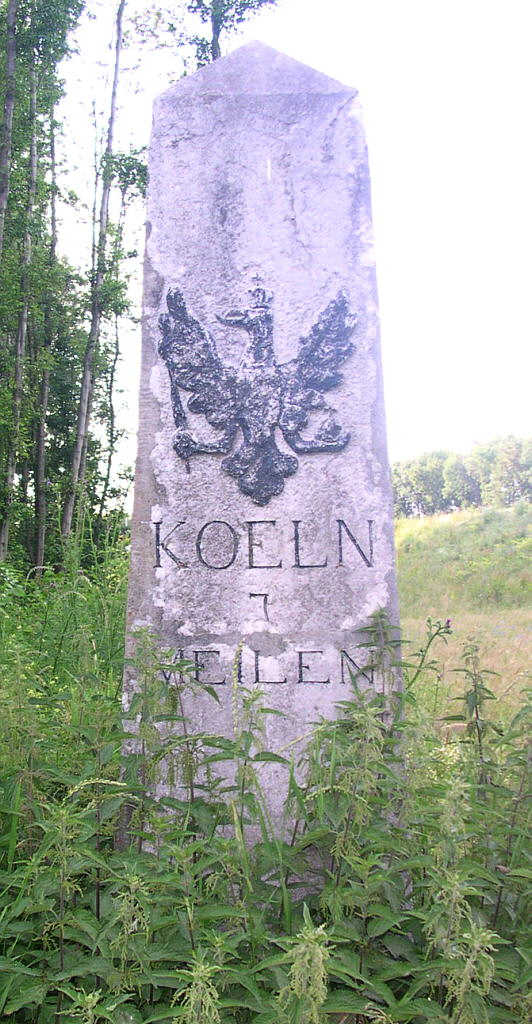
Alsdorf Hoengen Meilenstein

- Alsdorf Castle
- Mine Anna
- Water tower of mine Anna
- Ottenfeld Castle
- Alsdorf Civic Center (previously "Euro-Musical-Hall"). Musicals like Gaudí and Just One World were played there.
- Alsdorf Zoo
- Water tower "CineTower Alsdorf"

=== Blumenrath ===
- Blumenrather cross
- Secondary modern school Johann Heinrich Pestalozzi
- Blumenrath estate

=== Kellersberg ===
- Kellersberger mill

=== Mariadorf ===
- previously station Maria mine
- Church St. Mariae Empfängnis
- Middle school Marienschule
- Memorial
- Old major house
- Bus station
- Broicher mill

=== Hoengen ===
- Milestone

== Economy and infrastructure ==
For over a century, coal mining was the heart of Alsdorf's economy. Coal production started in 1849, when the Maria Mine opened in Hoengen. In 1853, production started in the Anna coal mine of Alsdorf. This was the reason for an increase in production and workforce, this was particularly measurable in mine Anna but not in mine Maria, which was closed by September 1962. Unfortunately, the coal crisis has not spared Alsdorf, and the last mine was closed in 1992.

Alsdorf's biggest employer was the Cinram GmbH, with about 2,000 employees in district of Schaufenberg. This company produces up to 2 million DVDs, Blu-rays and CDs daily, exported throughout Europe. The company was founded in 1975 by Warner Music and sold in 2003 to the Canadian stock corporation Cinram International. Customers are well-known record labels and media companies like Warner Music, Twentieth Century Fox and Universal Pictures. In 2017 close down its european manufacturing plant at Alsdorf.

Besides acquired companies, which either used the closeness to RWTH Aachen University or which saw the favourable location near the borders to Belgium and the Netherlands as advantage.

In June 2022 it was announced that in the first quarter of 2023 Continental the German multinational automotive parts manufacturing company would produce fuel tanks at Alsdorf. A new factory is built by Continental Fuel Storage Systems GmbH.

=== Traffic ===
Alsdorf is located in the heart of Europe, within approximately 200 km of the most important economic centers of the European Union. The town lies in the center of the tri-border region of Germany / Netherlands / Belgium.

The nearest airports are Maastricht Aachen Airport, Cologne Bonn Airport and Düsseldorf Airport.

Alsdorf has a direct connection to Bundesautobahn 4 and Bundesautobahn 44; both are German freeways.

Furthermore, Alsdorf provides a bus system. Every part of Alsdorf or Aachen is served by the buses of ASEAG, the local bus company.

Since 2005, Alsdorf is connected to the Euregiobahn a regional train system. The railway network has extended steadily; hence you can reach Mariadorf since 2011 by regional train.

== Twin towns – sister cities ==
Alsdorf is twinned with:

- Brunssum, Netherlands (1981)
- Hennigsdorf, Germany (1991)
- Saint-Brieuc, France (1970)

== Notable people ==
- Peter Heinrich Keulers (1896–1963), journalist and writer
- Herbert Zimmermann (1917–1966), reporter of the legendary radio report of the final match of 1954 FIFA World Cup in Bern)
- Ludwig Schaffrath (1924–2011), sculptor and painter, honorary citizen of Alsdorf
- Hans Berger (born 1938), honorary professor at the University of Applied Sciences Georg Agricola, Chairman of the Mining and Energy from 1991 to 1997, SPD member of the Bundestag from 1990 to 1998
- Helmut Brandt (born 1950), politician (CDU), Member of Bundestag
- Hans-Peter Lehnhoff (born 1963), former football player, including 1. FC Köln, Bayer 04 Leverkusen
- Ralf Souquet (born 1968), billiard champion and gold medalist World Games
- Torsten Frings (born 1976), football player and coach
- Kai Havertz (born 1999), football player

== Personalities who are associated with the city Alsdorf ==
- Kurt Koblitz (1916–1979), SPD member of the Bundestag
- Hans Ferner (1928–1982), SPD member of parliament
