= David C. Grossman =

American pediatrician (fl. 2000s)

David C. Grossman is an American pediatrician who practices at Kaiser Permanente Washington. He is the chairperson of the United States Preventive Services Task Force (USPSTF), a senior investigator at Kaiser Permanente Washington Health Research Institute, and a professor of health services and an adjunct professor of pediatrics at the University of Washington. He is known for his research on injury and suicide prevention. He is also known for his research on disparities in health among Native Americans, for which he received the Native American Child Health Advocacy Award from the American Academy of Pediatrics in 2007.

== Education and career ==
Grossman received his B.S. from the University of California, Berkeley in chemistry in 1978. He went on to receive his M.D. from the University of California Los Angeles in 1982 and his Master in Public Health from the University of Washington in 1990. In 1994, he became the co-director of the Harborview Injury Prevention and Research Center in Seattle, and in 2002, he became its sole director. He joined Kaiser Permanente Washington in 2004, when it was called Group Health Cooperative. In 2012, he became the medical director for Population and Purchaser Strategy at Kaiser Permanente Washington. From January 2008 to December 2013, he was a member of the USPSTF, and in March 2015, he was appointed its vice chair. From May 2017 to March 2018, he was the chair of the USPSTF.
