= David Grossman (journalist) =

British broadcast journalist

- Education: St Albans School; University of East Anglia

David M. Grossman (/ˈɡrɒsmən/) is a British journalist who has worked extensively for the BBC, he was US Correspondent and is now Chief Correspondent for BBC Two's current affairs programme Newsnight.

He was educated at St Albans School, an independent school for boys (now co-educational) in St Albans in Hertfordshire, followed by the University of East Anglia where he graduated with a degree in Politics in 1987. Grossman has worked as a reporter for On The Record, as a reporter and presenter on BBC Radio Solent, as a reporter with BBC South Today, and as Political Correspondent for BBC North West. He was Newsnight's technology editor before moving to become their US correspondent in August 2019.

Media offices
Preceded by ?	Technology Editor: Newsnight; 2014–present	Incumbent
Preceded by ?	US Correspondent: Newsnight; 2019–present	Incumbent
