= List of German Left Party politicians =

A list of notable politicians of the German Left Party:

== A ==
- Doris Achelwilm
- Hans-Henning Adler
- Gökay Akbulut
- Wolfram Adolphi
- Michael Aggelidis
- Hamide Akbayir
- Jan van Aken
- Ali Al-Dailami (formerly)
- Wolfgang Albers
- Christian Albrecht
- Elke Altmann
- Elmar Altvater
- Eva von Angern
- Moses Arndt
- Kersten Artus
- Ender Atakul
- Hüseyin Kenan Aydın

== B ==
- Jannik Balint
- Simone Barrientos
- Dietmar Bartsch
- Marcel Bauer
- Desiree Becker
- Maximilian Becker
- Julia Behrens
- Friederike Benda
- Sören Benn
- Theodor Bergmann
- Jacqueline Bernhardt
- Gerhard Besier
- Lorenz Gösta Beutin
- Sarah Bigall
- Karin Binder
- Matthias Birkwald
- Lothar Bisky
- Carola Bluhm
- Heidrun Bluhm
- Violetta Bock
- Marco Böhme
- Janina Böttger
- Julia Bonk
- Barbara Borchardt
- Jorrit Bosch
- Elke Breitenbach
- Anne-Mieke Bremer
- Sarah Bremer
- André Brie
- Maik Brückner
- Franziska Brychcy
- Christine Buchholz
- Clara Bünger
- Eva Bulling-Schröter
- Martina Bunge

== C ==
- Pilar Caballero Alvarez
- Jörg Cezanne
- Roland Claus
- Agnes Conrad
- Hans Coppi Jr.
- Harri Czepuck

== D ==
- Sevim Dağdelen (formerly)
- Özlem Demirel
- Steffen Dittes
- Anke Domscheit-Berg

== E ==
- Mirze Edis
- Mandy Eißing
- Dagmar Enkelmann
- Cornelia Ernst
- Klaus Ernst (formerly)

== F ==
- Fabian Fahl
- Susanne Ferschl
- Katrin Fey
- Heinrich Fink
- Uwe Foullong

== G ==
- Sylvia Gabelmann
- Kathrin Gebel
- Rico Gebhardt
- Wolfgang Gehrcke
- Katalin Gennburg
- Erwin Geschonneck
- Vinzenz Glaser
- Nicole Gohlke
- Diana Golze
- Christian Görke
- Gabriele Gottwald
- Angelika Gramkow
- Mustafa Groener
- Annette Groth
- Ates Gürpinar
- Gregor Gysi

== H ==
- André Hahn
- Thomas Händel
- Heike Hänsel
- Wolfgang Fritz Haug
- Lutz Heilmann
- Rosemarie Hein
- Kristin Heiß
- Anne Helm
- Susanne Hennig-Wellsow
- Axel Henschke
- Mareike Hermeier
- Kurt Herzog
- Dora Heyenn
- Inge Höger
- Matthias Höhn
- Helmut Holter
- Luke Hoß
- Andrej Hunko (formerly)

== I ==
- Cem Ince

== J ==
- Kay Jäger
- Antje Jansen
- Nelson Janßen
- Ulla Jelpke
- Luc Jochimsen
- Sabine Jünger

== K ==
- Kerstin Kaiser
- Maren Kaminski
- Susanna Karawanskij
- Sylvia-Yvonne Kaufmann
- Gisela Kessler
- Katja Kipping
- Regina Kittler
- Martha Kleedörfer
- Jürgen Klute
- Ferat Koçak
- Claudia Kohde-Kilsch
- Cansin Köktürk
- Katharina König-Preuss
- Jan Korte
- Jan Köstering
- Henriette Krebs
- Eva-Maria Kröger
- Elisabeth Kula
- Katrin Kunert

== L ==
- Oskar Lafontaine (formerly)
- Inge Lammel
- Dennis Lander
- Ina Latendorf
- Caren Lay
- Klaus Lederer
- Sonja Lemke
- Christian Leye (formerly)
- Lin Lindner
- Thomas Lippmann
- Katrin Lompscher
- Sabine Lösing
- Gesine Lötzsch

== M ==
- Bruno Mahlow
- Helmuth Markov
- Ulrich Maurer
- Tamara Mazzi
- Pascal Meiser
- Xenija Melnik
- Birgit Menz
- Stella Merendino
- Martina Michels
- Sahra Mirow
- Hans Modrow
- Irene Müller

== N ==
- Żaklin Nastić (formerly)
- Wolfgang Nešković
- Charlotte Neuhäuser
- Nam Duy Nguyen
- Thomas Nord

== O ==
- Cansu Özdemir
- Simone Oldenburg
- Willi van Ooyen

== P ==
- Norman Paech
- Luigi Pantisano
- Petra Pau
- Sören Pellmann
- Victor Perli
- Harald Petzold
- Tobias Pflüger
- Lisa Pfitzmann
- Richard Pitterle
- Yvonne Ploetz
- Birgit Pommer
- Peter Porsch

== Q ==
- Henriette Quade

== R ==
- Bodo Ramelow
- Heidi Reichinnek
- Lea Reisner
- Ingrid Remmers
- Martina Renner
- Bernd Riexinger
- Sabine Ritter
- Kristian Ronneburg
- Jeannine Rösler

== S ==
- Rüdiger Sagel
- Zada Salihović
- Jan Schalauske
- Susanne Schaper
- Carsten Schatz
- Maximilian Schirmer
- David Schliesing
- Sebastian Schlüsselburg
- Ines Schmidt
- Manuela Schmidt
- Evelyn Schötz
- Helmut Scholz
- Astrid Schramm (formerly)
- Eva Schreiber
- Katina Schubert
- Lisa Schubert
- Ines Schwerdtner
- Katrin Seidel
- Ilja Seifert
- Asya Şenyüz
- Raju Sharma
- Petra Sitte
- Katharina Slanina
- Peter Sodann
- Evrim Sommer
- Julia-Christina Stange
- Kersten Steinke
- Gerlinde Stobrawa
- Friedrich Straetmanns (formerly)

== T ==
- Anita Tack
- Kirsten Tackmann
- Wilfried Telkämper
- Frank Tempel
- Margot Theben
- Ulrich Thoden
- Gerhard Trabert
- Axel Troost

== U ==
- Feleknas Uca
- Alexander Ulrich (formerly)

== V ==
- Aaron Valent
- Damiano Valgolio
- Isabelle Vandre
- Kathrin Vogler
- Donata Vogtschmidt
- Sarah Vollath

== W ==
- Sahra Wagenknecht (formerly)
- Andreas Wagner
- Sascha H. Wagner
- Sebastian Walter
- Heike Werner
- Christin Willnat
- Sabine Wils
- Janine Wissler
- Harald Wolf
- Jörn Wunderlich

== Y ==
- Mehmet Yıldız

== Z ==
- Anne Zerr
- Steffen Zillich
- Gabi Zimmer
- Sabine Zimmermann (formerly)
- Pia Zimmermann
- Wolfgang Zimmermann
- Gerhard Zwerenz
