= The Left North Rhine-Westphalia =

Chapter of the Left Party in North Rhine-Westphalia

| Chairperson | Logo |
|---|---|
| Rüdiger Sagel | |
Party Overview
| Established: | 15 June 2007 |
| Place of establishment: | Gladbeck |
| Chairpersons: | Kathrin Vogler and Sascha H. Wagner |
| Deputies: | Derya Kilic; Cornelia Swillus-Knöchel; Azad Tarhan; Hans Günter Bell |
| Political manager: | Sascha H. Wagner |
| Treasurer: | Christel Rajda |
| Members: | 24,400 (September 2026) |
| Website: | www.dielinke-nrw.de |

The Left of North Rhine-Westphalia (Die Linke Nordrhein-Westfalen, usually written DIE LINKE.NRW) is the chapter of the Left Party in the German federal state of North Rhine-Westphalia.

== History ==
=== Past history ===
==== The WASG in North Rhine-Westphalia ====
Labour and Social Justice – The Electoral Alternative (Wahlalternative Arbeit und soziale Gerechtigkeit e.V., also called the WASG) was founded in Berlin on 3 July 2004, and its first North Rhine-Westphalia-wide General Assembly took place in Duisburg on 17 October 2004. From this association, a political party was formed at the national level on 22 January 2005, with the North Rhine-Westphalia chapter coming into existence just four days later, on 26 January 2005. The spokesperson was Hüseyin Kenan Aydin.

The North Rhine-Westphalia chapter received national attention because it was in this state that the party first ran for seats in the Landtag, or state parliament. A state conference in Düsseldorf on 23 January 2005 chose 40 candidates for the state reserve party list, with the Herne city party leader Jürgen Klute chosen as the lead candidate. With the North Rhine-Westphalia state election of 2005, the WASG immediately became the fifth largest party in the state, but as it only garnered 2.2% of the vote (well below the 5% threshold required to enter parliament), they did not receive any seats. The party entered this election still in direct competition to the ideologically similar Party of Democratic Socialism (PDS), with whom they would cooperate in later elections.

On the 25 and 26 of March 2006, the first state convention of the group as a political party took place in Dortmund.

==== PDS in North Rhine-Westphalia ====
The Party of Democratic Socialism (PDS) ran candidates in both the 2000 and 2005 state elections in North Rhine-Westphalia, garnering 1.1% and 0.9% of the votes, respectively.

=== The Left in North Rhine-Westphalia ===
The Left Party came into existence on 21 October 2007 through the merger of the WASG and the “Left Party.PDS North Rhine-Westphalia”, after the two groups had already cooperated in the federal 2005 election, under the name Left Party.PDS (Die Linkspartei.PDS). Many disillusioned former members of the SPD and the Greens became members of the Left, but the majority of members previously belonged to no other party. A significant portion are workers as well as the unemployed and those who remain in poverty under Hartz IV (a German social welfare program).

In 2009, the Left Party participated in its first municipal and federal elections in North Rhine-Westphalia, and after the state elections in May 2010, they entered the Landtag of North Rhine-Westphalia with 5.6% of the vote. Following the 2008 parliamentary elections in Hessen and the 2009 parliamentary elections in Saarland, this marked the third failure of the Left to participate in a state government's ruling coalition, after several exploratory meetings with the SPD and the Greens fell through.

With around 6,800 members, the North Rhine-Westphalia chapter of the Left is the largest in western Germany, and the third largest overall (as of November 2011).

== Positions ==
The party has a strong focus on economic and social policy.

The party calls for a changed economic system, in which the areas of public services, social infrastructure, energy and the financial sector are converted into public ownership (which is distinct from state ownership). The Left also wants a strong social safety net that protects against people risking their health or lives because of medical needs or poverty. In addition, the party stands for a proactive labor policy that ensures that regular, well-paid jobs are created and maintained.

With regards to civil society, the Left wants to enact a complete democratization of all areas of life. They see themselves as a feminist party that seeks to realize equality between the sexes, and in foreign politics, they are against military intervention of any kind, as well as for the disarmament and dissolution of NATO. They are extremely opposed to right extremism.

The state association within the party is just as radical. A Südwestrundfunk-broadcast out of Mainz shortly after the 2010 state parliamentary elections noted that seven of the eleven elected members of parliament from the party were also members of “extremist” groups, such as the Socialist Left, the Anticapitalist Left, and the Rote Hilfe. In particular, the broadcast noted that these members were not critical enough of the East German regime backed by the Soviet Union.

== Members of Parliament ==
Currently, there are 13 members of the North Rhine-Westphalia Left Party in the Bundestag as elected in the 2025 German federal election:

Sascha H. Wagner
Cansin Köktürk
Lea Reisner
Ulrich Thoden
Sonja Lemke
Mirze Edis
Kathrin Gebel
Dr. Fabian Fahl
Katrin Fey
Uwe Foullong
Mareike Hermeier
Jan Köstering
Charlotte Neuhäuser

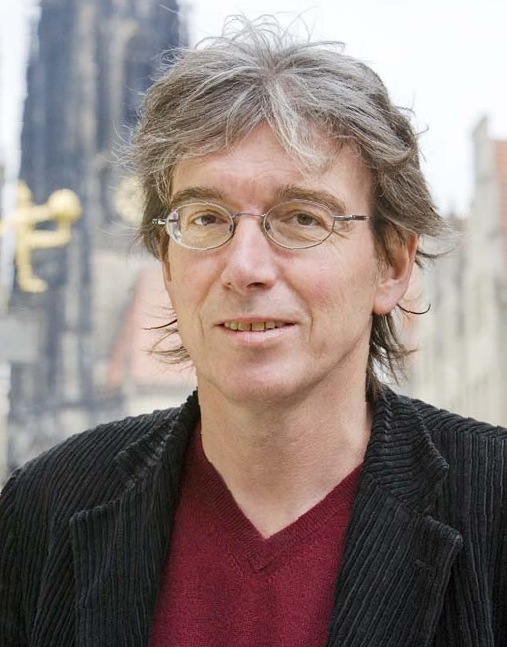
Rüdiger Sagel

After 15 June 2007, the Left has had one person, Rüdiger Sagel, in the Landtag of North Rhine-Westphalia, after Sagel switched his party affiliation from the Greens. Following the 2010 state elections in North Rhine-Westphalia, the state Left Party sent 11 deputies to the state parliament (or ‘’Landtag’’):

1. Bärbel Beuermann
2. Wolfgang Zimmermann
3. Carolin Butterwegge
4. Rüdiger Sagel
5. Gunhild Böth
6. Ralf Michalowsky
7. Anna Conrads
8. Ali Atalan
9. Özlem Alev Demirel
10. Michael Aggelidis
11. Hamide Akbayir

The Left was elected to many district councils following the district elections of 2009, but in the snap election on 13 May 2012 (held because the Landtag could not agree on the state’s budget), the Left only received 2.5 percent of the vote, and thus failed to garner enough support to clear the five-percent hurdle required to enter parliament. For this reason, they are no longer represented in the state parliament.

== Election results ==
=== State elections ===
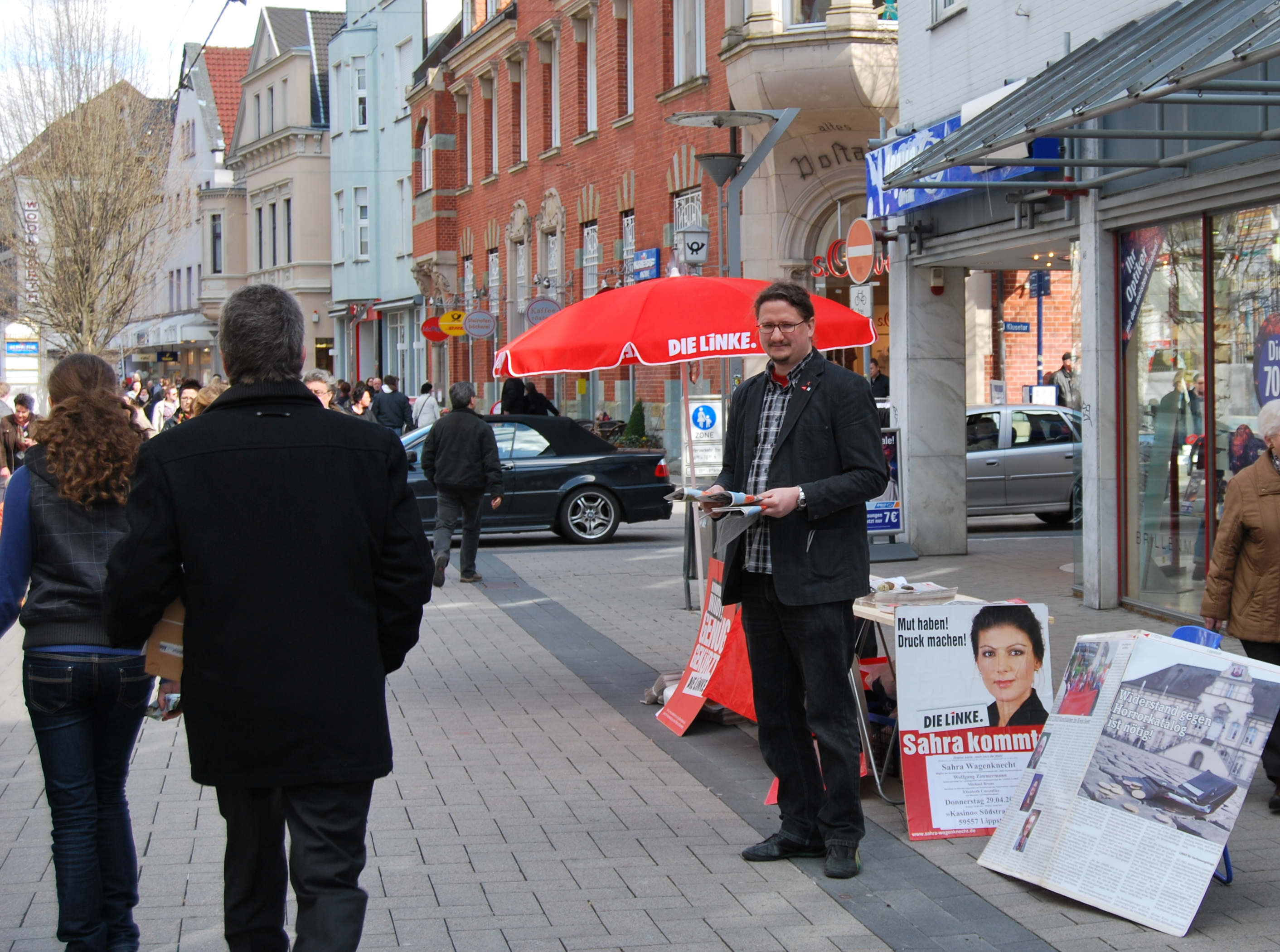
Campaigning for the Left in Lippstadt

| 2022 North Rhine-Westphalia state election | 15 May 2022 | 2.1% |
| 2017 North Rhine-Westphalia state election | 14 May 2017 | 4.9% |
| 2012 North Rhine-Westphalia state election | 13 May 2012 | 2.5% |
| 2010 North Rhine-Westphalia state election | 9 May 2010 | 5.6% |
| 2005 North Rhine-Westphalia state election | 22 May 2005 | 0.9 %^{1}; 2.2 %^{2} |
| 2000 North Rhine-Westphalia state election | 14 May 2000 | 1.1 %^{1} |

^{1} Party of Democratic Socialism (PDS) ^{2} Labour and Social Justice – The Electoral Alternative (WASG)

=== Federal elections ===
| Bundestag election | 2009 | 8.4% |
| Bundestag election | 2005 | 5.2 %^{3} |
| Bundestag election | 2002 | 1.2 %^{1} |
| Bundestag election | 1998 | 1.2 %^{1} |
| Bundestag election | 1994 | 1.0 %^{1} |
| Bundestag election | 1990 | 0.3 %^{1} |

^{1} > Party of Democratic Socialism (PDS) ^{3} Die Linkspartei.PDS
