= Ali Atalan =

Kurdish-German politician

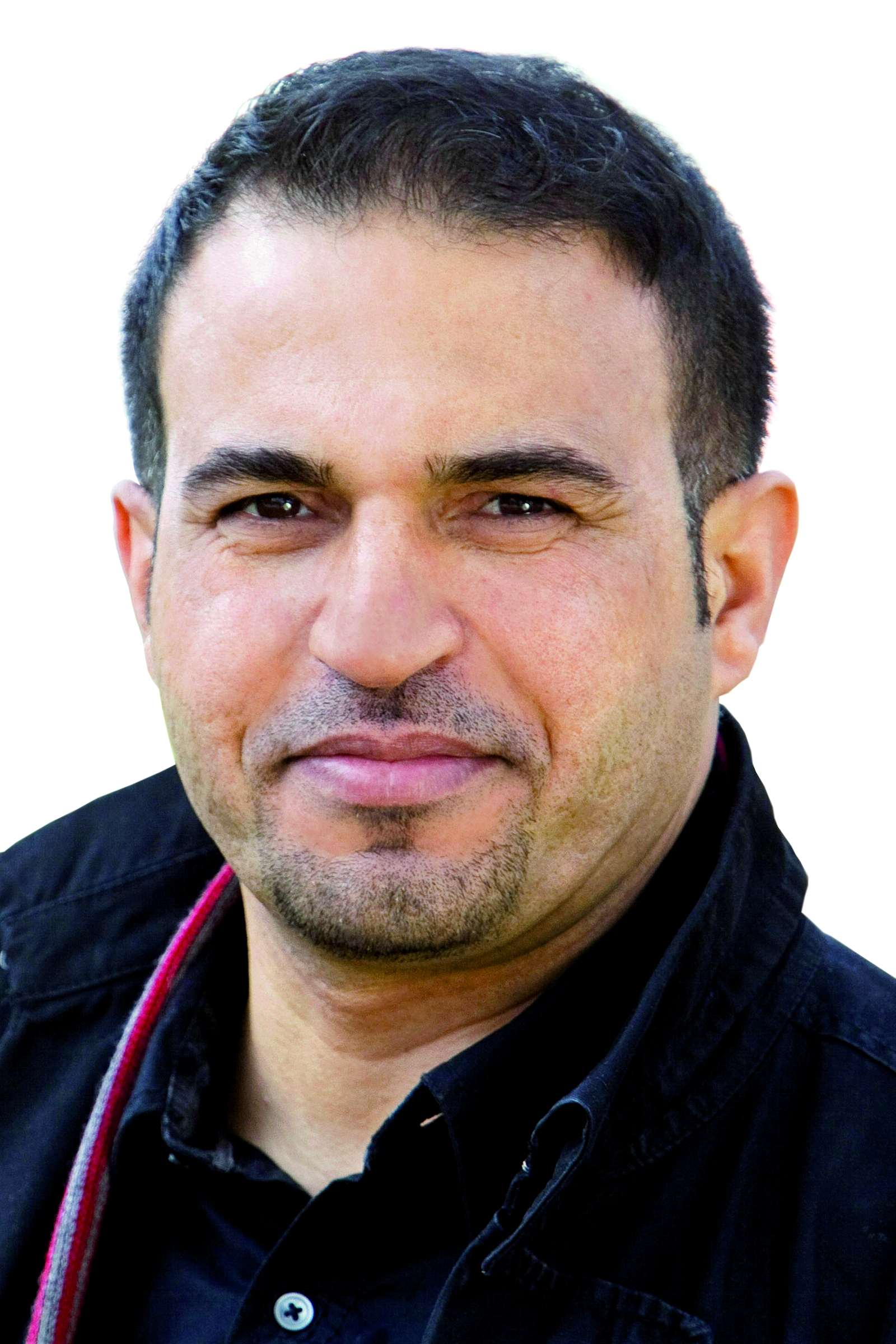
- Ali Atalan

Member of the Grand National Assembly
- In office 7 June 2015 – November 2015
- Constituency: Batman (June 2015)

Member of the Landtag of North Rhine-Westphalia
- In office 2010–2012

Personal details
- Born: January 5, 1968 (age 58) Midyat, Turkey
- Citizenship: German, Turkish
- Party: Die Linke (Germany); People's Democratic Party (HDP)

Ali Atalan (born 5 January 1968) is a Kurdish-German politician of Yazidi faith. He is a former member of the Landtag of North Rhine-Westphalia with Die Linke in Germany, and the Turkish Parliament with the Peoples' Democratic Party (HDP).

== Early life and education ==
Ali Atalan grew up in a Kurds-Yazidis family and came to Germany in 1985. After completing his Abitur in 1997, he studied political science and sociology at the Ruhr University Bochum, where he graduated in 2004 with a Diplom in social science.

== Political career ==
In Dülmen, Atalan belonged to the social committee of the city council from 1990 until 1994.

A member of the Greens from 1998 until 2001, he became a member of the Left Party in Germany in 2001. In 2004, he became a member of the city council in Münster. In the 2010 state elections, he was eighth on the state list of Die Linke North Rhine-Westphalia. Between 2010 until 2012, he assumed a seat in the 15th Landtag of North Rhine-Westphalia.

During the 2010 election period, Atalan's opponents made reference to his association with the "Anti-Capitalist Left" current, which has been investigated for suspicion of hostility against the German constitution, but whose political goals he supports. Atalan stated then that being anti-capitalist is not the same as being against the constitution, and that the German constitution is not inherently capitalist. Also during this time, his connection to the Kurdistan Workers' Party (PKK), which was in open military conflict with the Turkish government since 1984, was called into question. Atalan clarified that he was not a member of the PKK, but maintained that the ban on the PKK by the German government was counter-productive, and that Germany's position was used by Turkey to justify violence against Kurds in Turkey.

On 7 April 2015, Atalan was nominated by the People's Democratic Party (HDP) to their electoral list for the upcoming parliamentary election to the Grand National Assembly. Along with fellow party member Feleknas Uca, he became the first ever Yazidi member of the Assembly. In the general elections of November 2015, he was again a candidate, but was not elected.

On 13 November 2015, after the resumption of the Kurdish-Turkish conflict, the town of Nusaybin was placed under a curfew by the Turkish authorities. Atalan and Gülser Yıldırım, a member of the Grand National Assembly, began a hunger strike in protest against the curfew. The State Prosecutor for the Court of Cassation in Turkey Bekir Şahin filed a lawsuit before the Constitutional Court on the 17 March 2021, demanding for Atalan and 686 further HDP politicians a five-year ban for a political participation. The lawsuit was filed jointly with a request for the HDP to be shut down due to the parties alleged organizational links with the Kurdistan Workers' Party (PKK).
