= Wolfgang Zimmermann =

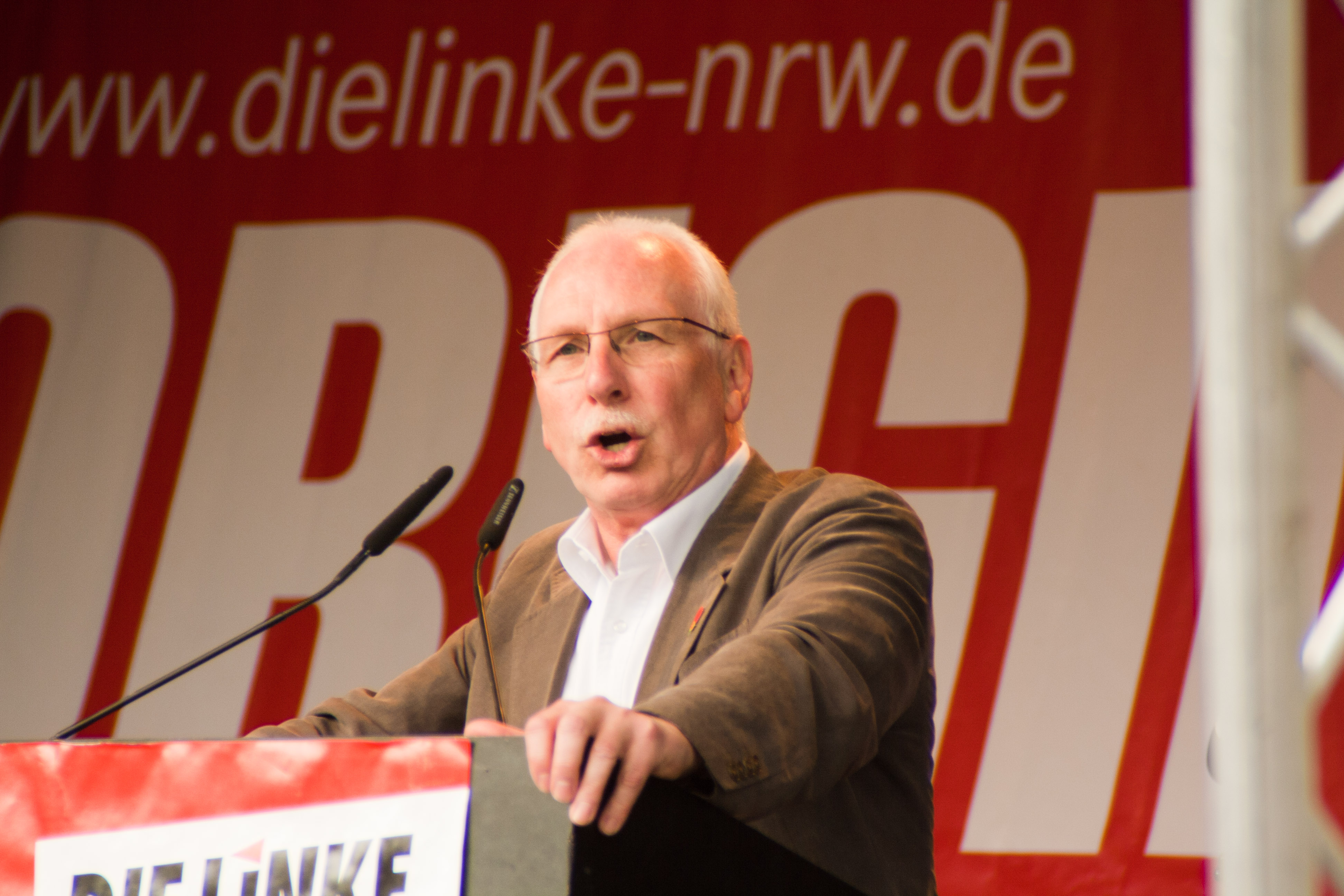
Wolfgang Zimmermann, 2010

Wolfgang Zimmermann (born 14 December 1949 in Leichlingen, West Germany) is a German politician and trade unionist. He was the state spokesperson for the Left Party in North Rhine-Westphalia from 2007 until 2010, and he represented (and was chairperson of the parliamentary group of) the Left in the Landtag of North Rhine-Westphalia from 2010 until 2012. He is also a member of the party managing board.

== Biography ==
From 1972 until 1975, Zimmerman studied at the Fachhochschule Düsseldorf, where he graduated with a Diplom in social work. Zimmermann has been a trade-unionist since 1973. Until November 2010, he was the chairperson of the Vereinte Dienstleistungsgewerkschaft district of Rhine-Wupper, and until March 2011, he was a member of the Vereinte Dienstleistungsgewerkschaft managing board in the state. Until May 2010, he represented full-time the employees of a hospital in Langenfeld where he was employed. Before joining the Labour and Social Justice – The Electoral Alternative (a precursor to the Left), he gained political experience with the Party of Democratic Socialism. He is a member of the socialist group International Socialist Left, a Trotskyist organization in Germany.

He replaced Hüseyin Kenan Aydın as the state spokesperson for the Labour and Social Justice – The Electoral Alternative in June 2005, and in November of that year, he was re-elected as spokesperson, together with his colleague Katherina Schwabedissen.

During the inaugural convention of the Left in North Rhine-Westphalia in Gladbeck on 20 October 2007, Zimmermann became the state spokesperson with 256 of 287 votes cast. He shared this office with Ulrike Detjen until 18 October 2008. During the state party convention on 18 October 2008, which was held in Essen, he was again elected to be spokesperson with 156 of 226 votes cast. Following the departure of Ulrike Detjen, he served in this position with Katharina Schwabedissen until July 2010.

In the 2010 state election, Wolfgang Zimmermann won a seat in the Landtag of North Rhine-Westphalia as the second person on the state party lists. In the inaugural meeting of the parliamentary group, he was elected (together with Bärbel Beuermann) to be the group's spokesperson. In the 2012 state election, the party again selected him to be listed second on the party lists. During a medical examination in the course of his campaign, he was discovered to have lung cancer, but despite this, he did not end his bid for election. When the Left failed to garner enough votes to surpass the 5% threshold required to remain in parliament, Zimmerman lost his seat.

Zimmermann occasionally writes articles for the Socialist Newspaper (Sozialistische Zeitung) and is associated with the "Anti-Capitalist Left", an anti-capitalist, anti-militarist caucus within the Left Party.
