= Free Republic of Wendland =

Micronation in Germany

Free Republic of Wendland Republik Freies Wendland
- Micronation (unrecognized entity)
- Area claimed: Camp in Gorleben, West Germany
- Type: Protest camp
- Dates claimed: 3 May 1980–4 June 1980

The Free Republic of Wendland (German: Republik Freies Wendland) was a self-declared micronation and protest camp established in Gorleben, West Germany, on 3 May 1980 to protest against the establishment of a nuclear waste dump there. On 4 June 1980, the police moved in and evicted the camp.

== History ==
=== Background ===
The Physikalisch-Technische Bundesanstalt conducted drilling in Gorleben in 1979 to test the salt domes there for suitability in storing radioactive waste. After small occupations by local activists at drill sites 1002 and 1003 failed, a plan was set in motion for a bigger occupation action that would include international anti-nuclear activists. A new demonstration was called for on 3 May 1980, under the motto "Day of action for the Wends" (Kampftag der Wenden).

=== Occupation ===
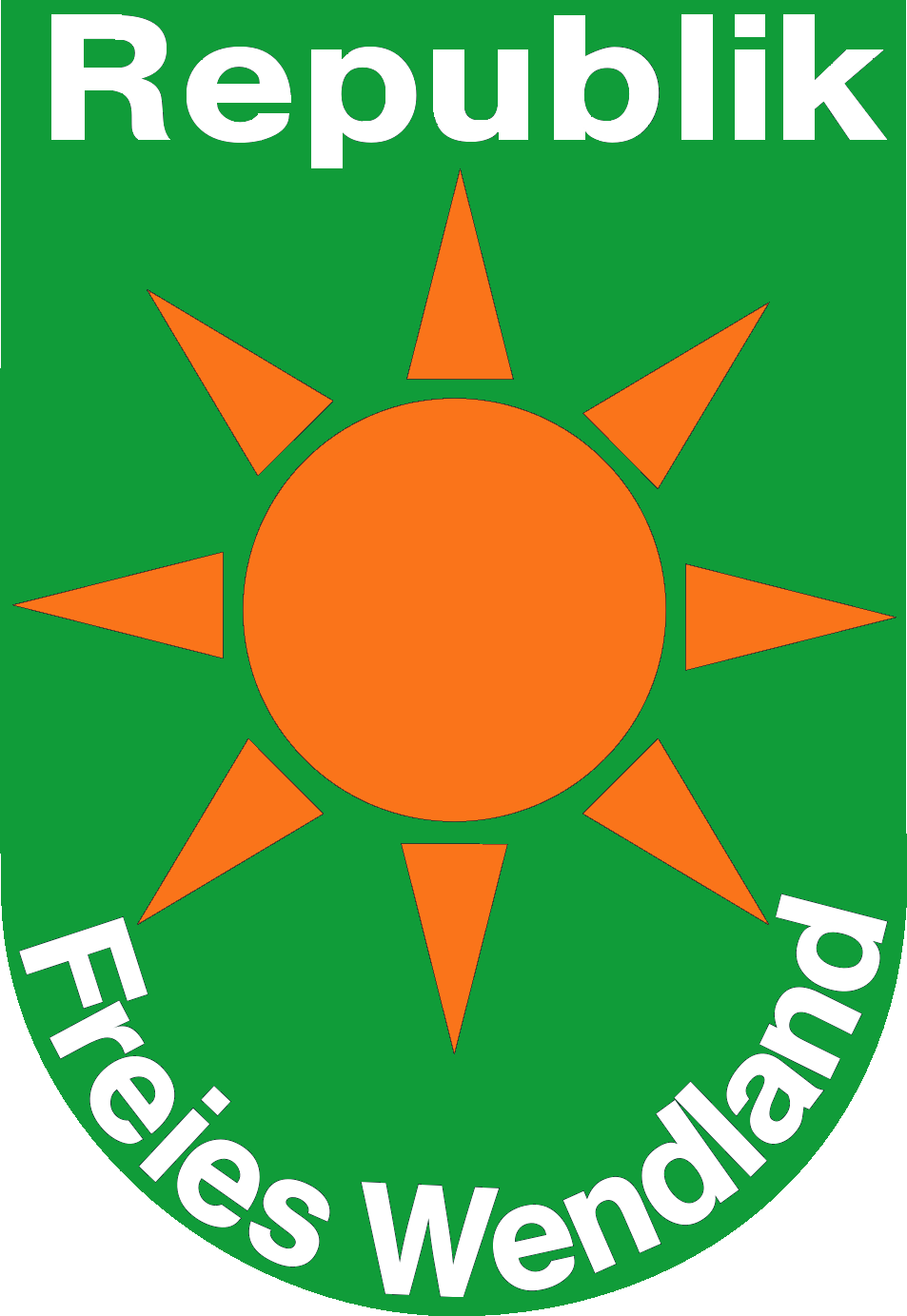
Symbol used by the protesters

Around 5000 anti-nuclear activists moved to the planned area around drilling site 1004, between the villages of Gorleben and Trebel. There, they occupied the area as part of a protest against further drilling to store nuclear waste. During the occupation, the so-called "Underground Office of Gorleben-Shall-Live" (Untergrundamt Gorleben-Soll-leben) declared the occupied area as an independent nation, naming it the Free Republic of Wendland (Republik Freies Wendland). The Lower-Saxon Minister of the Interior Egbert Möcklinghoff declared this proclamation to be high treason.

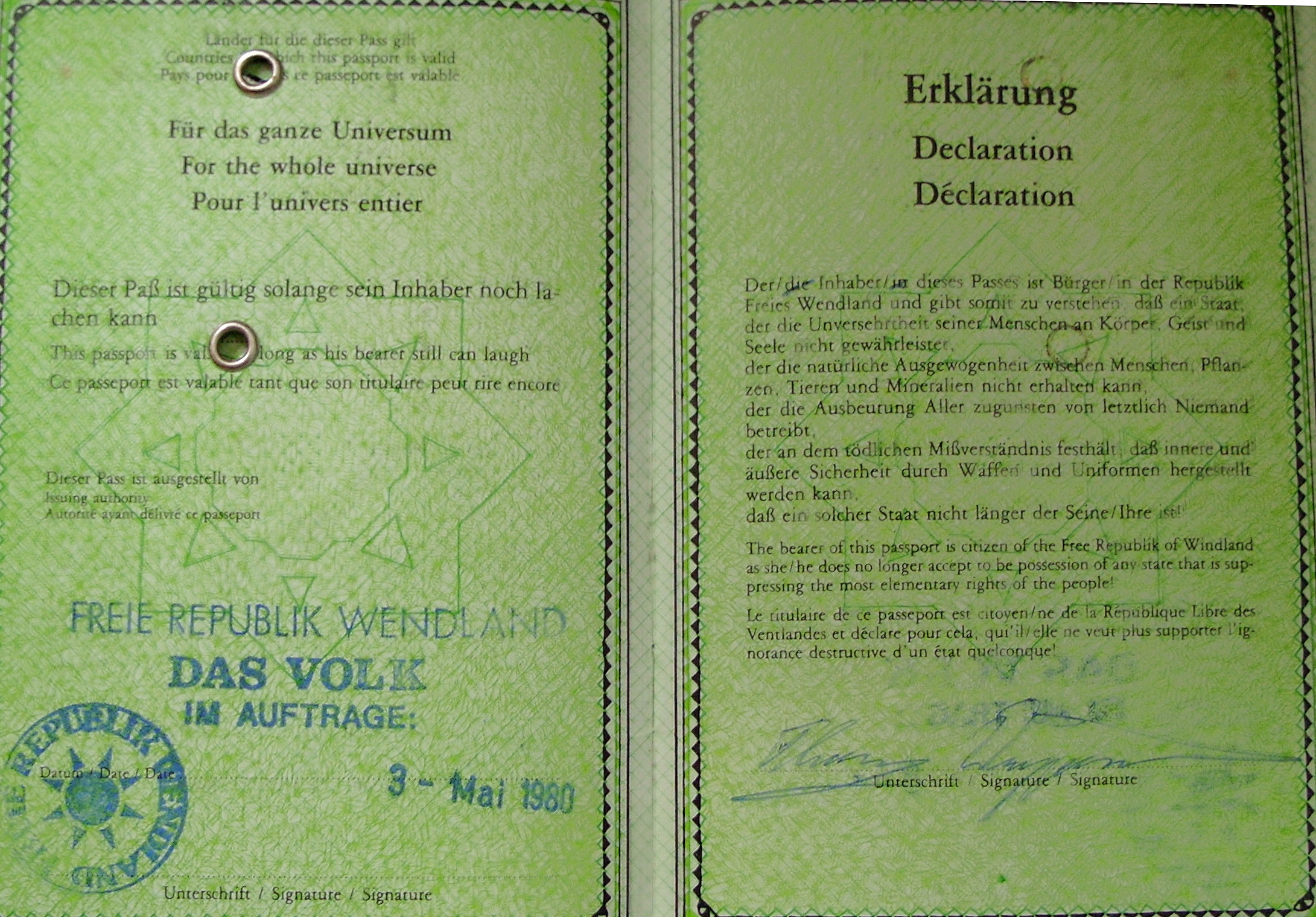
Wendenpass, taken 3 May 1980

The site was created on sandy soil and burned trees that was destroyed during the fire on the Lüneburg Heath in 1975. On this location, the protesters built over the course of several days a village of around 110 huts, made from wood and clay, which was a typical style of protest for anti-nuclear activists at the time. Among the buildings were numerous community facilities, such as the 100-person-capacity Friendship House, greenhouses, an infirmary, a hairdressing salon and an area for waste disposal. There was also a sauna and bathing facilities. Water was piped in by a wind-powered well and warmed with solar power.

On the approach to the "republic", a border checkpoint with a boom barrier was built, over which the flags of the Wends and of the Anti-Nuclear-Sun were hoisted. In the nearby information center, a Wends Passport (Wendenpass) could be issued, along with an entry stamp, for 10 Deutsche Marks. In the words of the occupiers, the passport was good "for the entire universe [...] so long as its owner could still laugh."

=== Community life ===
The roughly 1000 permanent occupiers organized community life during the 33-day occupation around a model of grassroots democracy. They established a spokespersons council and made decisions in regularly occurring mass meetings. Regarding their possible eviction by police, the widespread consensus was that of passive resistance, though a few militant occupiers spoke against this course. On the weekends, several thousand sympathizers and sightseers arrived at the occupied site, among them prominent people, such as the former head of the "Young Socialists", Gerhard Schröder. Other well-known visitors and residents included the resistance fighter Heinz Brandt, the musicians Walter Mossmann and Wolf Biermann, the photographer Günter Zint and the SPD politician Jo Leinen, as well as the writer Klaus Schlesinger. The group decision-making process took place both in the Friendship House, as well as at other equally suitable platforms. These places also hosted lectures, discussions, readings, rock concerts and puppet shows. Residents of the surrounding region supported the occupation with food and timber. On 18 May 1980, Radio Free Wendland began a pirate radio broadcast from a tower at the occupation site.

=== Eviction ===
On the morning of 4 June 1980, the occupation site was cleared by the Lower Saxony police and the Federal Border Guard on the order of Chancellor Helmut Schmidt. Around 3500 officers took part in the operation, according to the Lower Saxony Ministry of the Interior and of Sports. Legal grounds for the eviction of the occupiers were based on violations of various laws, including forestry laws, building regulations, the Field and Forest Planning Act and the Registration Act. By the time of the eviction, around 2000 occupiers had gather in the village's central square for a sit-in style protest. The eviction, during which many of the squatters were carried away by police officers, proceeded largely peacefully. The pirate radio broadcast Radio Free Wendland reported on the eviction from its tower throughout the day. Once finished, the police thanked the demonstrators over a loudspeaker for their nonviolent approach.

== Reception ==
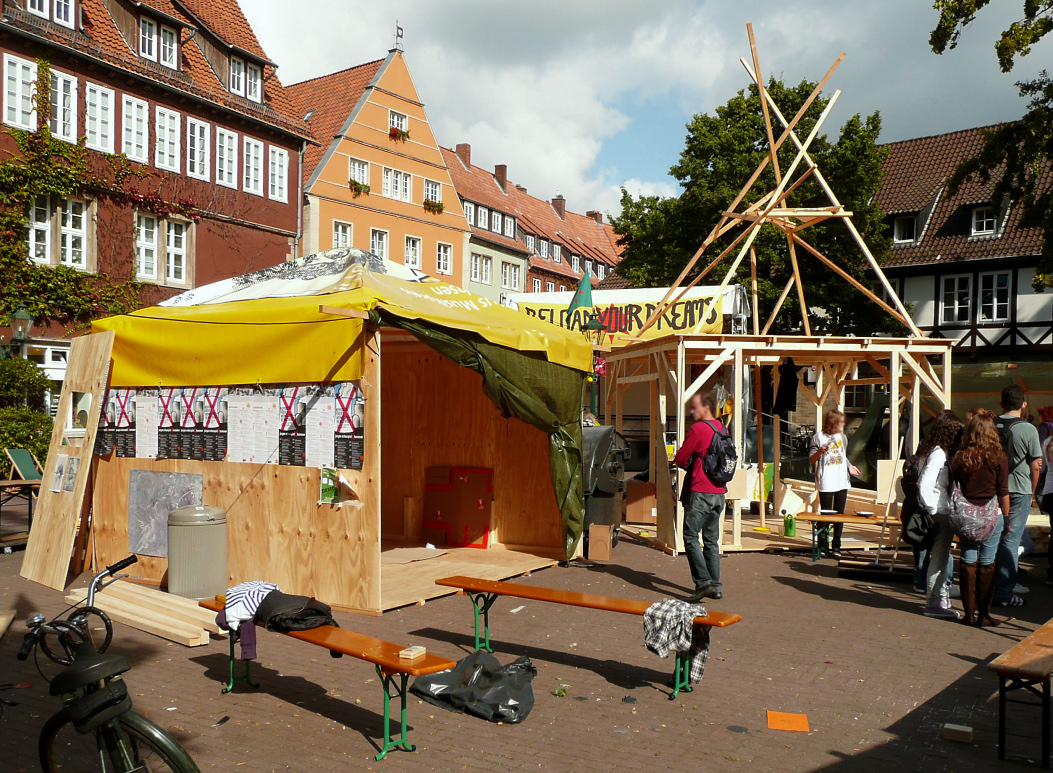
A reproduction of the huts typical for the Republik Freies Wendland protest camp in Hanover in 2010.

Long after the occupation by anti-nuclear activists of the Wendland was concluded, the concept of the Free Republic of Wendland continues to be evoked. Thus in 2006, a five-page advertisement by the Free Republic of Wendland against the Nuclear Industry and Police Brutality was published in a local newspaper.

Between 4 and 6 June 2010, on the 30th anniversary of the eviction, a memorial and protest weekend was held near Gorleben, in which about 800 people participated. During this action, members of the Rural Emergency Association Lüchow-Dannenberg erected a "hut sanctuary" in the forest in memory of the hut village of the Free Republic of Wendland.

After the 30th anniversary of the eviction, the director Florian Fiedler, along with the Playhouse Hannover, initiated the theatre project Free Republic of Wendland -- Reactivated from 17 until 26 September 2010. About 50 students, especially from the Gesamtschule IGS Roderbruch, and 25 adults from the Ballhof Theatre in Hannover erected a hut village in Ballhof Square along the same lines of the original protest village. Several performances, including puppet acts by the Bread and Puppet Theater, as well as concerts, lectures and discussions on nuclear power took place. The festivities were commenced with a performance by Ton Steine Scherben and concluded with a discussion led by Oskar Negt. Media attention was mostly focused on the project after someone threw a pie at Green Party member Trittin during a panel discussion. After nine days the hut village was dismantled. Two of the wooden huts were brought to the Wendland in order to provide an anti-nuclear activist shelter.

As before, the flag with the coat of arms of Wendland is a symbol of the anti-nuclear movement. It can be purchased in many places, and occasionally Wends Passports with stamps are offered at some protest camps.

== Publications ==
- "Resistance Report Wendland: Part 1, January 1983 - June 1985", 1985

== See also ==
- Anti-nuclear movement in Germany
- Hambach Forest
- Rüdiger Sagel

== Works cited ==
- Günter Zint; Caroline Fetscher (1980), Republik Freies Wendland. Eine Dokumentation (in German), Frankfurt am Main: Zweitausendeins
- Dieter Halbach; Gerd Panzer (1980), Zwischen Gorleben und Stadtleben. Erfahrungen aus 3 Jahren Widerstand im Wendland und in dezentralen Aktionen (in German), Berlin: AHDE-Verlag, ISBN 3-8136-0021-1
- 101 UKW: Radio Freies Wendland, hrsg. Network Medien-Cooperative, Frankfurt/Main, 1983 (Tondokumentation der Räumung des Hüttendorfes am 4. Juni 1980)
