= Rüdiger Sagel =

German politician

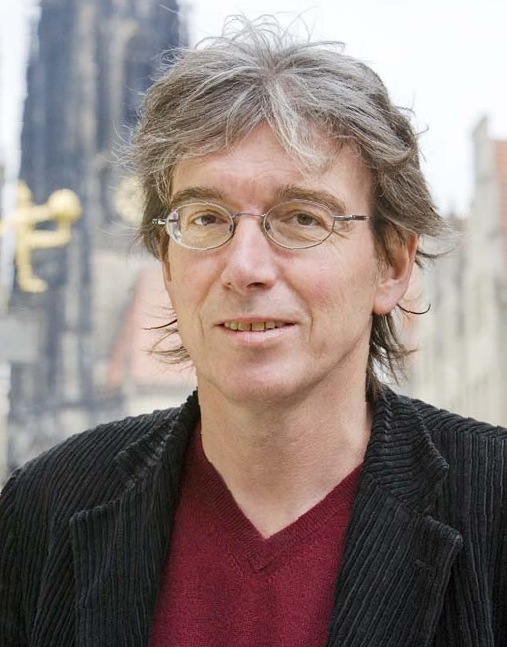
- Rüdiger Sagel
- Born: 9 August 1955 (age 70); Lünen, West Germany
- Occupations: Politician, Engineer

Rüdiger Sagel (born 9 August 1955) is a German politician currently with the Left Party and previously with the Alliance '90/The Greens. From 1998 until 2012 he was a member of the state parliament (Landtag) for North Rhine-Westphalia. On 30 June 2012 he and Gunhild Böth were elected in Münster as state spokespersons for the Left in North Rhine-Westphalia.

== Life ==
From 1968 to 1970, Sagel spent time at a German school in Rourkela, a city in the Indian state of Orissa, but by 1975, he had completed his Abitur in Lünen. Following this, he had a yearlong internship with a focus on the mining industry at the Clausthal University of Technology, before finishing his Diplom in engineering at RWTH Aachen University in 1983.

During the next two years, he was head of the Hambach-Gruppe in Aachen, which was a citizen initiative against the Hambach surface mine. Until 1987 he worked for the German Project Union in Essen. In 1988 Sagel lived in Nicaragua, where he worked on cultural projects, including a literacy campaign in Rama. He then traveled to several Central and South American countries, especially through the Amazon region of Brazil.

After his return to Germany, Sagel was project leader of the Social Work Project Group (Arbeitsgemeinschaft Betriebssozialarbeit), and from 1995 until 1998 he worked in the district office of the Bundestag member Winfried Nachtwei, who was a member of the Greens.

== Politics ==
Rüdiger Sagel has been active in politics since the 1970s. Since 1976 and the Kalkar-demonstrations against a nuclear reactor, he has been involved in anti-nuclear activism. He was also active in the summer of 1980 in the Free Republic of Wendland protest camp, until the government shut it down. Also during this time, he founded the Hambach-Gruppe with friends and colleagues, which was an initiative against the social and ecological consequences of surface mining. He was also active in the squatter scene around Templergraben and the Johannes-Höver House. He was a founding member of the Ecology-Center Aachen Group in 1982. Since the founding of the Green Party in 1980, he supported the political work of the party. In particular, he helped during the 1980 federal campaign of the former NRW-lead candidate Joseph Beuys. After the Greens entered the Bundestag in 1983, he created a study concerning surface mining and a new energy policy in Deutschland. He returned to Latin American from 1987–1989, and after he returned to Germany in 1989, he ran for office as a member of the Green party. In the following two years, he was a board member for the GAL/Greens in the city of Münster, and from 1994, in the district of Münster. From 1993 Sagel was a member of the state party council for the Alliance ‘90/the Greens party. Between 1994 and 1999 he was a member of the city council for Münster. Since 2003 he was also a member of the state council for the Greens, though in 2006, his candidacy for the party council was not successful. From 1998 Sagel was a member of the Landtag of North Rhine-Westphalia, where he was a spokesperson for the Greens regarding budgetary and financial issues.

On 15 June 2007 Sagel left the parliamentary group of the Greens, and the following day, he left the party entirely. On 16 June 2007 he was a guest of the founding congress of the Left Party in Berlin and was welcomed by party leader Oskar Lafontaine and with applause from delegates. On 23 October 2007, he joined the Left Party. During the federal election of 2009, Sagel ran in the electoral district of Hochsauerland and received 6.2% of the vote. In the state parliamentary election in 2010, he ran as a direct candidate in Münster. Because of his position on the state party list, and the Left’s relative success in garnering more than 5% of the vote (which is a requirement for parties to enter the Landtag, or state parliament), he became a member of the state parliament in 2010. On 11 May 2010, during the inaugural meeting of the Left state parliamentary group, Sagel and Carolin Butterwegge were elected as Deputy Chairpersons. During the state election of 2012, he again ran as a direct candidate in Münster, but was not listed on the party list for the state. The party, however, did not surpass the minimum requirement of 5% to enter the state parliament, and Sagel himself garnered only 2.3 percent of the votes in his district, so he and the rest of his party left the state parliament in May 2012.

In 2009, Sagel presented a historiographical study on the suppressed Nazi-past of certain CDU and FDP members of state parliament who served after 1945. Sagel is also a member of the Vereinte Dienstleistungsgewerkschaft (a German trade organization), as well as the Charitable Society in Support of Asylum Seekers (GGUA).

== Publications ==
- Problemaufriss Braunkohle, hrsg.v. der Bundestagsfraktion Die Grünen, Bonn 1983/84.
- Verheizte Heimat, (Alano-Publisher) Aachen 1985.
- Alternatives Abfallwirtschaftskonzept für den Kreis Unna, edited by the Greens, Unna 1984.
- Problemaufriss Steinkohle, The Greens NRW, Düsseldorf 1984.
- Sozialverträglichkeit von Umsiedlung im Rheinischen Braunkohlerevier, edited by the NRW-Ministry of the Environment, Düsseldorf 1987.
- 60 Jahre Landtag, Das vergessene braune Erbe, edited by Rüdiger Sagel, Münster 2009.
