= Leichlingen =

- Town
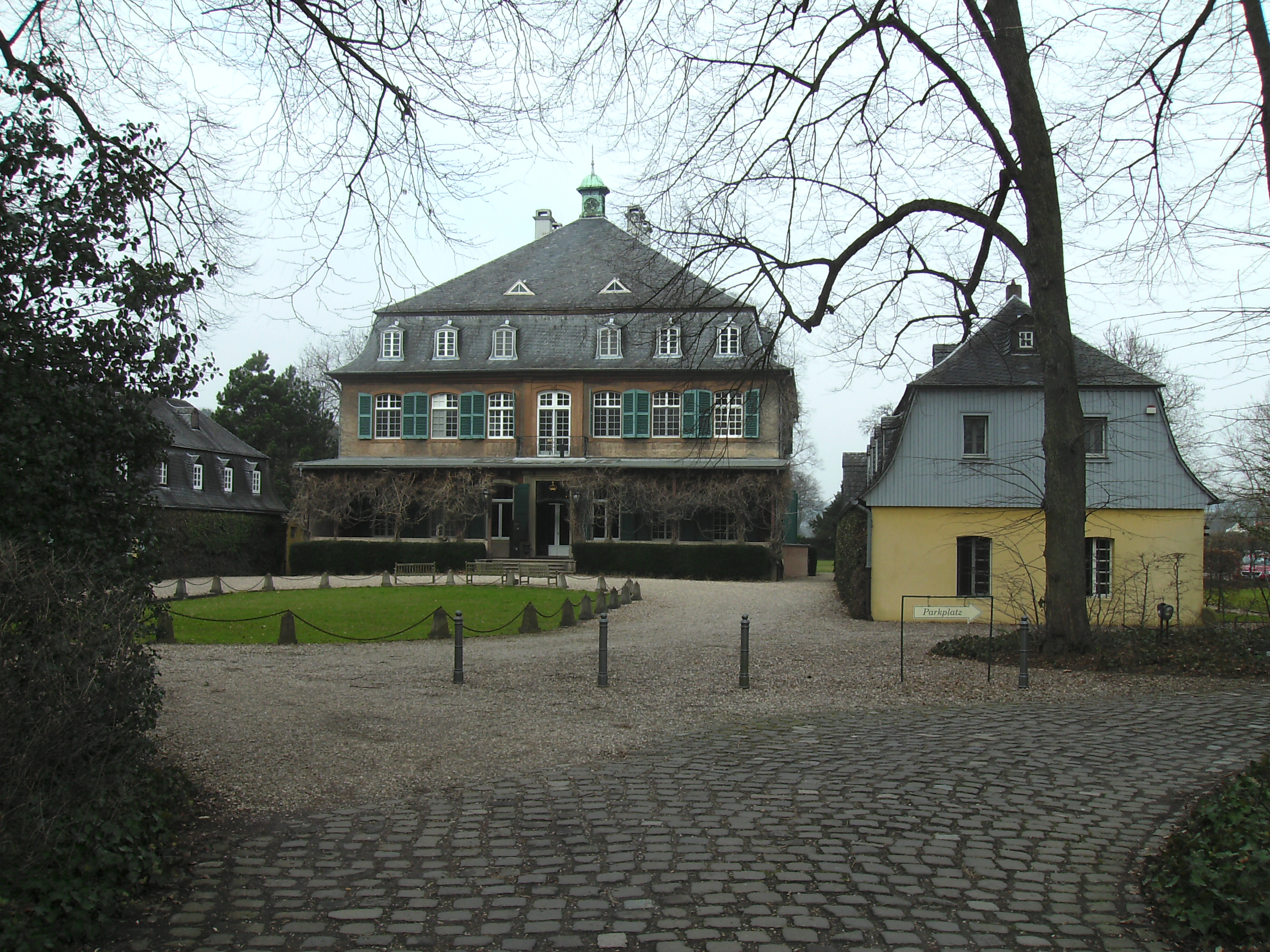
- Eicherhof Manor

- Flag Coat of arms

- Location of Leichlingen within Rheinisch-Bergischer Kreis district
- Interactive map of Leichlingen
- Location within Germany Location within North Rhine-Westphalia
- Coordinates: 51°07′N 7°01′E
- Country: Germany
- State: North Rhine-Westphalia
- Admin. region: Cologne
- District: Rheinisch-Bergischer Kreis
- Subdivisions: 13

Government
  - Mayor (2025–29): Maurice WInter (CDU)

Area
  - Total: 37.26 km^{2} (14.39 sq mi)
- Elevation: 54–250 m (177–820 ft)

Population (2025-12-31)
  - Total: 28,205
  - Density: 757.0/km^{2} (1,961/sq mi)
- Time zone: UTC+01:00 (CET)
  - Summer (DST): UTC+02:00 (CEST)
- Postal codes: 42799
- Dialling codes: 02175; 02174 (Witzhelden)
- Vehicle registration: GL
- Website: www.leichlingen.de

Leichlingen (German pronunciation: [ˈlaɪçlɪŋən]; officially Leichlingen (Rheinland); Ripuarian: Lëijchlinge) is a town in the Rheinisch-Bergischer Kreis, North Rhine-Westphalia, Germany. Leichlingen is a centre for apple and berry growing in the region.

== Geography ==
Leichlingen is situated at the edge of the Rhine-Ruhr metropolitan region close to Cologne. The town centre lies on the river Wupper.

== Population ==
Historical population

Year	Pop.	±% p.a.
1965	19,446	—
1970	24,146	+4.42%
1975	24,610	+0.38%
1980	24,599	−0.01%
1985	23,851	−0.62%
1990	25,996	+1.74%
1995	26,366	+0.28%

Year	Pop.	±% p.a.
2000	26,796	+0.32%
2005	27,536	+0.55%
2010	27,481	−0.04%
2015	27,937	+0.33%
2020	27,885	−0.04%
2025	28,205	+0.23%

Source: Landesdatabank Nordrhein-Westfalen

== Twin towns – sister cities ==
Leichlingen is twinned with:

- Funchal, Portugal
- Henley-on-Thames, England, United Kingdom
- Marly-le-Roi, France

== Notable people ==
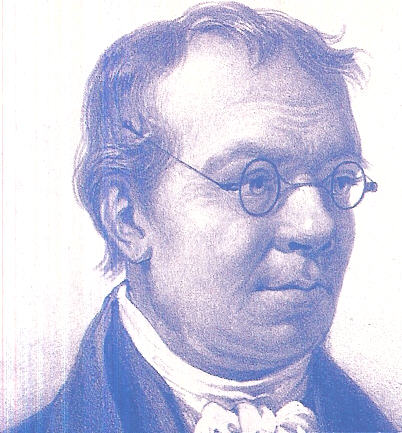
Johann Wilhelm Wilms

- Johann Wilhelm Wilms (1772–1847), composer
- Friedrich Überweg (1826–1871), philosopher
- Hugo Broch (1922–2026), World War II flying ace
- Wolfgang Zimmermann (born 1949), trade unionist, politician (The Left)
- Michael Biegler (born 1961), handball coach
