= Michael Aggelidis =

German politician

Michael Georg Aggelidis
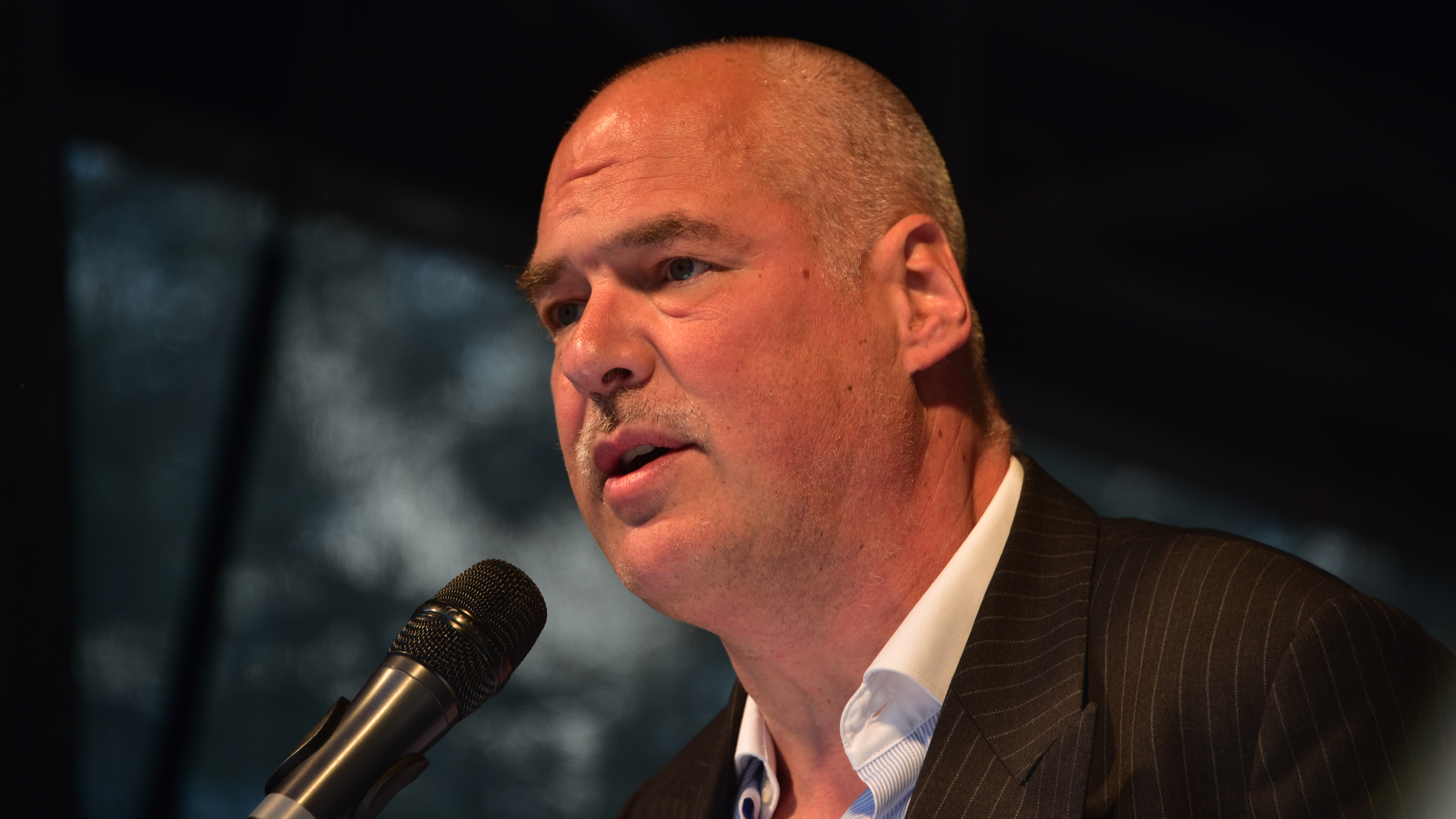

Member of the Landtag of North Rhine-Westphalia
- In office 2010–2012

Personal details
- Born: June 7, 1962 (age 63) Dormagen, West Germany
- Party: Die Linke

Michael Georg Aggelidis (born 7 June 1962 in Dormagen) is a German politician of the Left Party in North Rhine-Westphalia.

== Life and work ==
Michael Aggelidis studied legal science at the Free University of Berlin and the University of Cologne, and since 1995, he has worked as a private practice lawyer in Bonn who specializes in legal assistance, as well as matrimonial and family law. He is married and has two children.

== Political activities ==
Michael Aggelidis was for many years a member of the SPD and the PDS, as well as a founding member of the Labour and Social Justice – The Electoral Alternative (WASG). Since the Left's creation, he has been active in party politics.

Aggelidis is a member of the state executive board and legal counsel for the Left, as well as the energy policy spokesperson for the party. He is also a member of Greenpeace, Euronatur and the Association of Energy Consumers, as well as legal counsel with Deputy Managing Directorship of the Education Community Salz.

In the state election of 2010, Michael Aggelidis was a direct candidate for the Left in the city of Bonn. As the 10th person on the state party list, he was sent to the Landtag of North Rhine-Westphalia as a member of the state parliament representing the Left. He lost his seat when all of the Left members were ousted following the 2012 state elections, in which the Left Party did not garner enough votes to pass the required 5% threshold.
