= Hugo Broch =

German fighter ace and Knight's Cross recipient (1922–2026)

- Broch during World War II
- Born: 6 January 1922; Leichlingen, Prussia, Germany
- Died: 31 May 2026 (aged 104)
- Military career
- Allegiance: Nazi Germany
- Branch: Luftwaffe
- Service years: 1940–1945
- Rank: Leutnant (second lieutenant)
- Unit: JG 54
- Conflicts: World War II; Eastern Front; Courland Pocket
- Awards: Knight's Cross of the Iron Cross
- Other work: Employee with Agfa

Hugo Broch (6 January 1922 – 31 May 2026) was one of the last living German Luftwaffe flying aces of the Second World War, along with Norbert Schücking. He was credited with 81 victories in 324 missions, all on the Eastern Front. Broch was the last living recipient of the Knight's Cross of the Iron Cross.

== Early life ==
Broch was born on 6 November 1922 in Leichlingen within the Rheinisch-Bergischer Kreis, then in the Rhine Province. A childhood interest in planes led Broch to join the Aviation Hitler Youth near Solingen. He assisted in the assembly of the school's SG38 glider, and flew it before graduating to a Piper.

== World War II ==
Broch joined Luftwaffe Construction Company 42/XII of Luftflotte 3 on 15 January 1940, and subsequently received basic training in the Fluganwärter Battalion. From 19 November 1940 to 29 October 1941, he attended the A/B 63 Aircraft Pilot School at Marienbad and Karlsbad in the Sudetengau, and at Vilseck in the Upper Palatinate. From 18 November 1941 to 10 February 1942, he attended the Fighter Pilot Pre-School at Kamenz in Saxony, where he earned an Aircraft Pilot Badge. Broch was trained as a fighter pilot from 27 May to 2 November 1942 at Fighter Pilot School 2 in Zerbst. In January 1943, he arrived on the Eastern Front to serve in World War II as part of Jagdgeschwader 54 (54th Fighter Wing), and he claimed his first victory two months later.

In late November 1944, a newly formed 8. Staffel of JG 54 was formed at Heiligenbeil, now Mamonovo, and placed under command of Leutnant Hermann Schleinhege. Broch, who was assigned to the Staffel, claimed an Ilyushin Il-2 ground-attack aircraft shot down south of Liepāja on 14 December.

== Later life and death ==
Following World War II, Broch worked for Agfa in Leverkusen. He was a prolific autograph signer, and signed many memorabilia items. At age 95, he fulfilled a long-held ambition to fly in a Spitfire, the two seat Tr.9 MJ627. Broch died on 31 May 2026, at the age of 104.

== Summary of career ==
=== Aerial victory claims ===
According to U.S. historian David T. Zabecki, Broch was credited with 82 aerial victories. Spick lists him with 81 aerial victories claimed in 324 combat missions, a mission-to-claim ratio of 4.00. All of his victories were recorded over the Eastern Front. Mathews and Foreman, authors of Luftwaffe Aces – Biographies and Victory Claims, researched the German Federal Archives and found records for 81 aerial victory claims, all on the Eastern Front.

Victory claims were logged to a map reference, for example "PQ 35 Ost 35371" (PQ = Planquadrat) The Luftwaffe grid map (Jägermeldenetz) covered all of Europe, western Russia, and North Africa, and was composed of rectangles measuring 15 minutes of latitude by 30 minutes of longitude, an area of about 360 square miles (930 km^{2}). These sectors were then subdivided into 36 smaller units to give a location area 3 by 4 km (1.9 by 2.5 mi) in size.

Chronicle of aerial victories
Indicates unconfirmed aerial victory claims for which Broch did not receive credit. Indicates information discrepancies listed by Prien, Stemmer, Rodeike, Bock, Schumann, Mehwitz, Mathews and Foreman.
Claim	Date	Time	Type	Location	Claim	Date	Time	Type	Location
6. Staffel of Jagdgeschwader 54; Eastern Front: 4 February – 31 December 1943
— (Note: This unconfirmed claim is not listed by Prien, Stemmer, Rodeike and Bock. It is also not listed by Mathews and Foreman.)	7 March 1943	—	LaGG-3		23	2 September 1943	10:01	Yak-9	PQ 35 Ost 35371, west of Yelnya; 5 km (3.1 mi) southwest of Yelnya
1	13 March 1943	15:18	Il-2	PQ 36 Ost 20122, north of Volkhov west of Volkhov	24	5 September 1943	15:35	Yak-9	PQ 35 Ost 35372, northwest of Yelnya; 5 km (3.1 mi) southwest of Yelnya
2	19 March 1943	15:37	Il-2	PQ 36 Ost 00451, northwest of Ulyanovka; 15 km (9.3 mi) east-southeast of Slutsk	25	7 September 1943	10:55	Yak-9	PQ 35 Ost 26812, northeast of Dukhovshchina; 20 km (12 mi) north-northwest of Yartsevo
3	21 March 1943	12:00	LaGG-3	PQ 36 Ost 00192, northwest of Kolpino; 10 km (6.2 mi) north of Pushkin	26	10 September 1943	10:05	LaGG-3	PQ 35 Ost 26813, east of Dukhovshchina; 20 km (12 mi) north-northwest of Yartsevo
4	1 June 1943	05:10	LaGG-3	PQ 36 Ost 20123, northwest of Volkhov west of Volkhov	27	14 September 1943	12:05? (Note: According to Mathews and Foreman claimed at 12:09.)	La-5	PQ 35 Ost 35372, northwest of Yelnya; 5 km (3.1 mi) southwest of Yelnya
5	16 July 1943	04:35	LaGG-3	west of Bolkhov	28	14 September 1943	16:37	Pe-2	PQ 35 Ost 25672, west of Shatalovka; 10 km (6.2 mi) southeast of Shatalovka
6	21 July 1943	13:34	Yak-7	PQ 35 Ost 64794, east of Oryol; 25 km (16 mi) east-northeast of Oryol	29	15 September 1943	08:44	La-5	PQ 35 Ost 26813, east of Dukhovshchina
7	22 July 1943	15:21	Yak-7	southwest of Troitskoye; Oryol	30	15 September 1943	13:13	Yak-9	PQ 35 Ost 35511, southwest of Yelnya; 15 km (9.3 mi) southwest of Yelnya
8	2 August 1943	08:54	Il-2	PQ 36 Ost 10172 vicinity of Mga	31	15 September 1943	17:35	La-5	PQ 35 Ost 35512, west of Yelnya; 15 km (9.3 mi) southwest of Yelnya
9	12 August 1943	08:00	Yak-7	PQ 35 Ost 54763, east-northeast of Kirov; 25 km (16 mi) east of Karachev	32	25 October 1943	15:34	Yak-9	PQ 35 Ost 10132 east of Shlisselburg
10	12 August 1943	12:50	LaGG-3	PQ 35 Ost 35621, southeast of Kijuschki; 20 km (12 mi) west-northwest of Spas-Demensk	33	26 October 1943	14:50	Yak-9	PQ 35 Ost 10131 east of Shlisselburg
11	14 August 1943	05:02	Yak-9	PQ 35 Ost 45752, northwest of Kirov; 5 km (3.1 mi) northwest of Kirov	34	26 October 1943	15:02	La-5	PQ 35 Ost 11783 over Lake Ladoga
12	19 August 1943	16:25	Yak-9	PQ 35 Ost 45744, northwest of Kirov; 15 km (9.3 mi) west of Kirov	35	28 October 1943	12:07	La-5	PQ 35 Ost 01474; 65 km (40 mi) northeast of Zelenogorsk
13	19 August 1943	16:38	Yak-9	PQ 35 Ost 35864; 25 km (16 mi) west of Kirov	36	28 October 1943	12:15	Il-2	PQ 35 Ost 01623; 60 km (37 mi) north-northeast of Leningrad
14	21 August 1943	16:46	Yak-9	PQ 35 Ost 43813, northwest of Sevsk; 10 km (6.2 mi) northeast of Sevsk	37	29 October 1943	09:09	Yak-9	PQ 35 Ost 01663; 60 km (37 mi) northeast of Leningrad
15	22 August 1943	13:05	Yak-9	PQ 35 Ost 43223, southwest of Rushnoje; 15 km (9.3 mi) west-southwest of Tschaikowka	38	2 November 1943	13:20	Il-2	PQ 35 Ost 10123 east of Shlisselburg
16	22 August 1943	16:23	La-5	PQ 35 Ost 43823, east-northeast of Sevsk; 15 km (9.3 mi) east-northeast of Sevsk	39	2 November 1943	15:07	Yak-9	PQ 35 Ost 01441; Lake Ladoga
17	23 August 1943	18:39	LaGG-3	PQ 35 Ost 44664; 25 km (16 mi) north-northwest of Karachev	40	2 November 1943	15:12	Yak-9	PQ 35 Ost 01413
18	24 August 1943	07:03	La-5	PQ 35 Ost 44481, east of Kalino; 25 km (16 mi) south of Sevsk	41	5 November 1943	10:46	La-5	PQ 35 Ost 01561; 45 km (28 mi) northeast of Zelenogorsk
19	24 August 1943	14:43	La-5	PQ 35 Ost 54553, east of Krassnaja; 30 km (19 mi) north-northeast of Karachev	42	5 November 1943	10:50	Il-2	PQ 35 Ost 01564; 45 km (28 mi) northeast of Zelenogorsk
20	28 August 1943	11:49	Yak-9	PQ 35 Ost 43683, northeast of Sevsk; 20 km (12 mi) northeast of Sevsk	43	5 November 1943	13:05	Il-2	PQ 35 Ost 01533; 55 km (34 mi) northeast of Zelenogorsk
21	31 August 1943	15:33	Yak-9	PQ 35 Ost 35523; 5 km (3.1 mi) south of Yelnya	44	6 November 1943	15:20	Yak-9	PQ 35 Ost 01564; 45 km (28 mi) northeast of Zelenogorsk
22	31 August 1943	17:43	La-5	PQ 35 Ost 35384, southwest of Yelnya; 5 km (3.1 mi) southeast of Yelnya					
6. Staffel of Jagdgeschwader 54; Eastern Front: 16 August – 30 September 1944
45	17 August 1944	13:09	La-5	PQ 25 Ost 79814, southeast of Mehikoorma; Lake Peipus	53	14 September 1944	18:42? (Note: According to Mathews and Foreman claimed at 17:42.)	Yak-9	PQ 25 Ost 68113, west of Priipalu; 20 km (12 mi) north of Walk
46	21 August 1944	18:11	La-5	PQ 25 Ost 68274, south of Antsla; 20 km (12 mi) west-southwest of Võru	54	16 September 1944	17:35	Pe-2	PQ 25 Ost 57258, west of Engekarti; 40 km (25 mi) north-northwest of Kreutzburg
47	21 August 1944	18:15	La-5	PQ 25 Ost 68282, east of Antsla south of Võru	55	16 September 1944	17:39	Pe-2	PQ 25 Ost 57259, west of Engekarti; 40 km (25 mi) north-northwest of Kreutzburg
48	25 August 1944	09:33	Yak-9	PQ 25 Ost 67116, west of Ruli	56	16 September 1944	18:00	La-5	PQ 25 Ost 57267, south of Lake Kalu; 40 km (25 mi) north of Kreutzburg
49	25 August 1944	09:34	Il-2	PQ 25 Ost 67119, southwest of Ruli	57	20 September 1944	11:42	Il-2	PQ 25 Ost 69116; 25 km (16 mi) east-northeast of Weissenstein
50	30 August 1944	17:55	La-5	PQ 25 Ost 69568, west of Tartu; 15 km (9.3 mi) west of Tartu	58	23 September 1944	12:35	La-5	PQ 25 Ost 58625 west of Jēkabpils
51	6 September 1944	12:55	Yak-9	PQ 25 Ost 69632, northwest of Kaarli northeast Tartu	59	30 September 1944	12:22	La-5	PQ 25 Ost 57115; 10 km (6.2 mi) southeast of Mālpils
52	14 September 1944	18:41? (Note: According to Mathews and Foreman claimed at 17:41.)	Yak-9	PQ 25 Ost 68115, north-northwest of Soe; 20 km (12 mi) north of Walk					
Stab II. Gruppe of Jagdgeschwader 54 Eastern Front: 1 – 31 October 1944
60	10 October 1944	10:18	Pe-2	PQ 25 Ost 17528, east of Tilti; 15 km (9.3 mi) southeast of Liepāja	63	28 October 1944	11:46? (Note: According to Mathews and Foreman claimed at 11:47.)	Il-2	PQ 25 Ost 07495, west of Liepāja
61	22 October 1944	14:25	Yak-9	PQ 25 Ost 17543, northeast of Alpeni; 20 km (12 mi) south of Liepāja	64	28 October 1944	15:15	Il-2	PQ 25 Ost 17642, south of Priekule; 30 km (19 mi) southeast of Liepāja
62	28 October 1944	11:46	Il-2	PQ 25 Ost 07492, west of Libau					
8. Staffel of Jagdgeschwader 54; Eastern Front: November 1944 – 8 May 1945
65	14 December 1944	12:22	Il-2	south of Liepāja	74	20 January 1945	14:42	Yak-9	west of Skrunda
66	14 December 1944	12:23	Il-2	southwest of Liepāja	75	26 January 1945	09:40	P-39	PQ 27397
67	15 December 1944	10:58	Pe-2	east of Tilti	76	29 January 1945	12:15	Il-2	PQ 17569
68	15 December 1944	11:00	P-39	south of Tilti	77	21 February 1945	12:33	Pe-2	PQ 17611
69	21 December 1944	11:58	Il-2	south of Gubas	78	23 March 1945	16:14	Yak-9	PQ 17478
70	22 December 1944	11:46	Yak-3	west of Bernali	79	23 March 1945	16:19	Il-2	PQ 17479
71	26 December 1944	12:29	Il-2	southwest of Frauenstadt	80	26 March 1945	08:02	Yak-3	PQ 07732
72	20 January 1945	14:26	Pe-2	southeast of Skrunda	81	26 March 1945	08:03	Yak-3	PQ 07733
73	20 January 1945	14:29	Yak-9	west of Skrunda					

=== Awards and decorations ===
- Aviator badge (28 November 1941)
- Front Flying Clasp of the Luftwaffe
  - in Bronze (26 March 1943)
  - in Silver (10 June 1943)
  - in Gold (23 August 1943)
- Iron Cross (1939)
  - 2nd Class (7 April 1943)
  - 1st Class (11 August 1943)
- Honor Goblet of the Luftwaffe on 8 November 1943 as Unteroffizier and pilot (Note: According to Obermaier and Schumann on 27 October 1943.)
- German Cross in Gold on 26 November 1943 as Unteroffizier in the 6./Jagdgeschwader 54
- Knight's Cross of the Iron Cross on 12 March 1945 as Feldwebel and pilot in the 8./Jagdgeschwader 54
- Courland Cuff Title (20 April 1945)
