= Sarah Bigall =

German politician (born 1987)

- Bigall in 2026

Member of the Berlin House of Representatives
- Incumbent
- Assumed office 29 October 2026
- Constituency: Marzahn-Hellersdorf

Personal details
- Born: 1987 (age 38–39)
- Party: Die Linke

Sarah Bigall (née Fingarow; born 1987) is a German politician who was elected member of the Berlin House of Representatives in 2026. From 2011 to 2026, she was a borough councillor of Marzahn-Hellersdorf.
