= Mustafa Groener =

German politician (born 1999)

Member of the Landtag of Saxony-Anhalt
- Assuming office 6 October 2026
- Succeeding: Tobias Krull
- Constituency: Magdeburg II

Personal details
- Born: 1999 (age 26–27)
- Party: Die Linke (since 2023)

Mustafa Groener (born 1999) is a German politician who was elected member of the Landtag of Saxony-Anhalt in 2026. He has been a member of Die Linke since 2023.
