= Feleknas Uca =

German politician of Kurdish descent (born 1976)

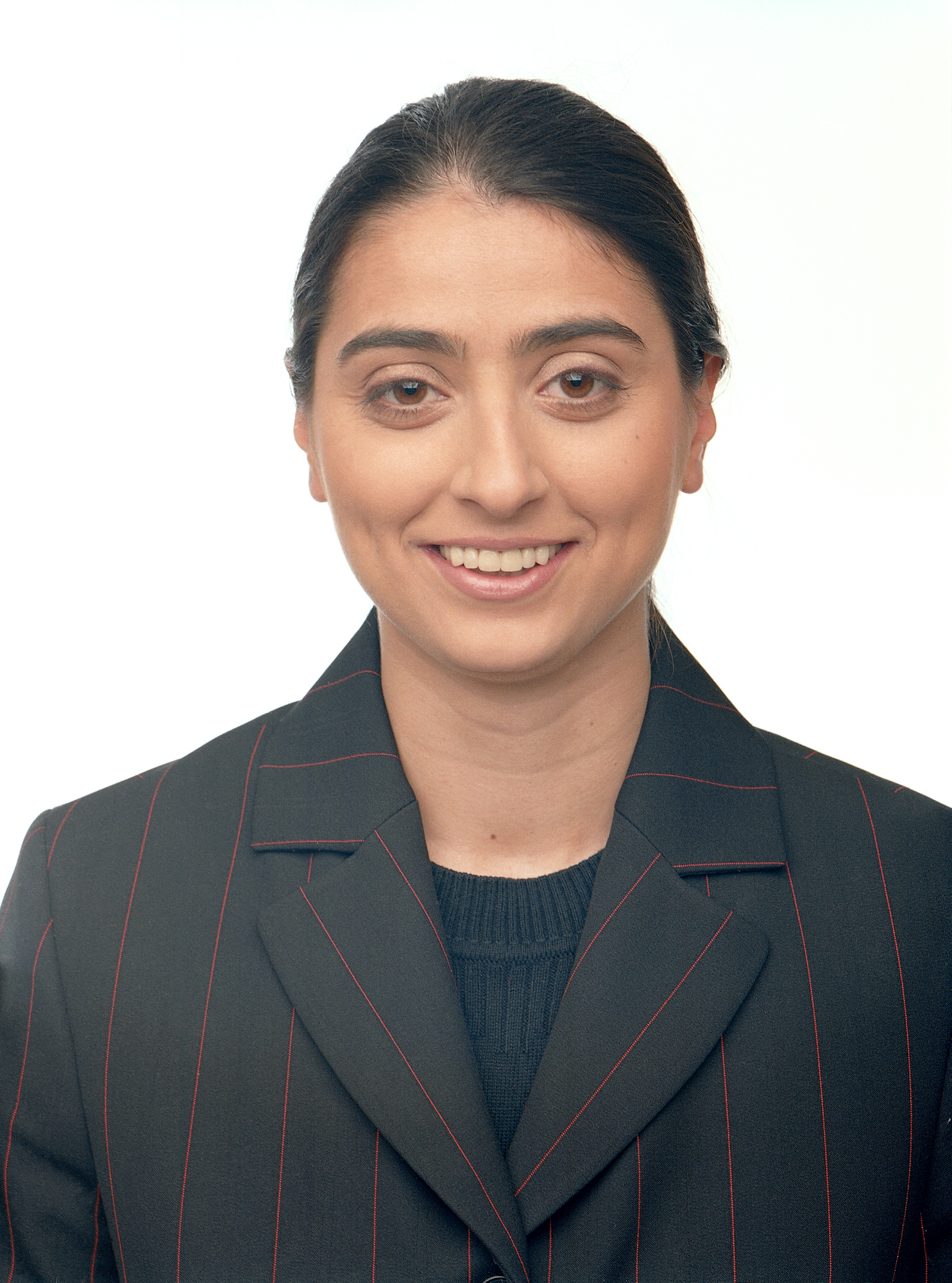
- Uca in 2004

Member of the Grand National Assembly
- In office 7 June 2015 – 2 June 2023
- Constituency: Diyarbakır (June 2015, Nov 2015); Batman (2018)

Member of the European Parliament for Germany
- In office 13 June 1999 – 7 June 2009
- Preceded by: Multi-member district
- Succeeded by: Multi-member district
- Constituency: Party of Democratic Socialism list

Personal details
- Born: 17 September 1976 (age 49) Celle, Lower Saxony, West Germany
- Party: Peoples' Democratic Party
- Other party: Party of Democratic Socialism (1999–2007); Die Linke (2007–2009)

Feleknas Uca (born 17 September 1976) is a German politician of Kurdish Yazidi descent. From 1999 to 2009, she was member of the European Parliament from Germany, serving with Die Linke. Feleknas Uca was at one time the world's only Yazidi parliamentarian until the Iraqi legislature was elected in 2005. She is formerly HDP's Batman MP.

== Life and work ==
Feleknas Uca was born in Celle, Lower Saxony, West Germany to an immigrant Yazidi family originally from southeastern Turkey. She graduated from Comprehensive School in Celle before taking an apprenticeship as a doctor's assistant, and completed her Abitur by distance learning. In 2010 she established the Feleknas Uca Foundation which focuses of the women and children rights. Uca was also the local spokesperson for representative of Terre des Femmes. Until July 2014, Feleknas Uca lived in Celle until she relocated to Diyarbakir in Turkey.

== Political career ==
=== In Europe ===
In 1999, aged 22, she was elected to the European Parliament fifth of six places on the Party of Democratic Socialism national list. In the 5th European Parliament (1999–2004), she sat on the Parliament's committees on Culture, Education and the Media and Equal Opportunities. She maintained close links with pro-Kurdish groups in Turkey. She was a member of the EU-Turkey joint parliamentary committee.

In the PDS' selection of candidates for elections to the 6th European Parliament (2004–2009), Uca slipped to seventh place on the PDS national list, putting her seat under severe pressure. However, in the elections, she was returned in the last successful place.

While serving in the European Parliament, she attracted controversy within Turkey for her pro-Kurdish stances. In 2005, the Democratic People's Party (DEHAP) was investigated by Turkish police for a speech given by Uca in the Kurdish language in which she called for the decrease of the electoral threshold from 10%, declare a general amnesty and suspend all military actions.

In 2009, Uca left the European Parliament. In 2012, she was detained in Turkey's Istanbul Airport for attempting to take a large number of B-1 vitamins to Kurdish prisoners in Turkish prisons and was deported to Germany.

=== In Turkey ===
In July 2014, Uca resettled to Diyarbakır, the largest Kurdish populated city in Turkey. On 7 April 2015, Uca was nominated by the HDP to their electoral list for the upcoming parliamentary election as one of a number of Yazidis running for office. In the general elections on 7 June 2015 and 1 November 2015 she was elected a the Grand National Assembly of Turkey, both times representing the HDP for Diyarbakir. Turkish press reports write that she is the first ever Yazidi member of the Assembly along with Ali Atalan. In May 2016, her parliamentary immunity was lifted, which was condemned by several European politicians. She was re-elected in the Parliamentary Elections on 24 June 2018.

== Political positions ==
=== Kurdish politics ===
She was a member of the MP delegation in march to Cizre during the Curfew of Cizre in 2015. She is a supporter of the use of the Kurdish language, and opposes the prohibition of theater plays, events in the Kurdish language and the detention of people who teach in Kurdish language. She supports the co-chair system implemented in the municipalities governed by the Democratic Regions Party (DBP) and condemns the fact that the state appointed trustees assumed as acting mayors instead of the elected mayors of the BDP.

=== Foreign politics ===
She is a member of the EU-Turkey partner delegation for Turkey and the co-spokesperson for foreign relations of the HDP. She supports the autonomous Government in Syrian Kurdistan led by the Democratic Union Party (PYD). She is also grateful to the Kurdistan Workers' Party (PKK) for their defense of the Yazidi against the Islamic State (IS) in Iraq.

== Legal prosecution ==
In 2017 she was prosecuted for spreading terror propaganda. The State Prosecutor at the Court of Cassation in Turkey Bekir Şahin filed a lawsuit before the Constitutional Court on the 17 March 2021, demanding for Uca and 686 other HDP politicians a five-year ban for political activities. The lawsuit was filed together with a request for the HDP to be shut down due to the parties alleged organizational links with the PKK.

== Personal life ==
She is prepared to be detained in any moment and keeps a packed suitcase ready with her belongings in the case of an arrest.

== See also ==
- Yazidis in Turkey
