= Henriette Quade =

German politician (born 1984)

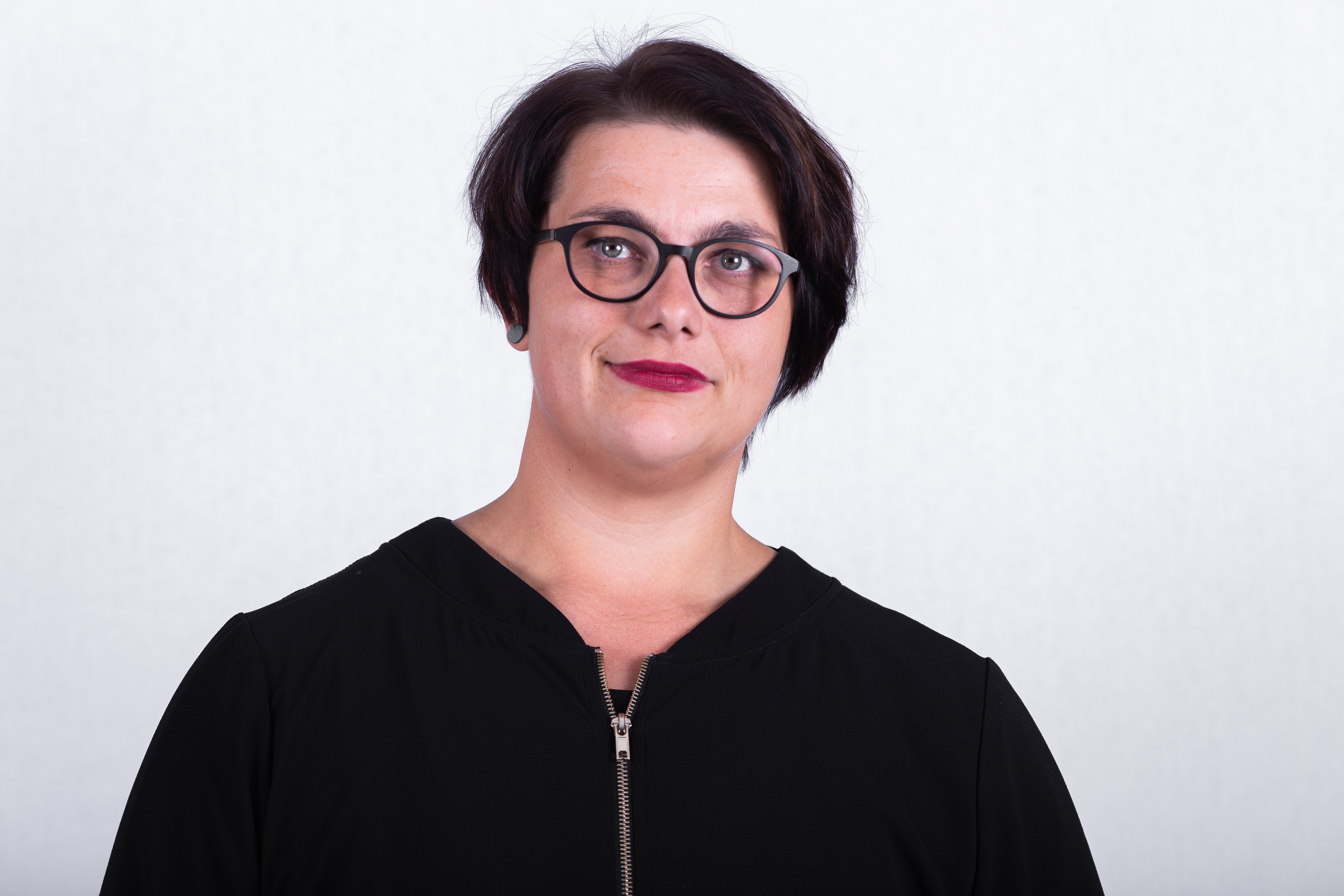
- Quade in 2018

Member of the Landtag of Saxony-Anhalt
- Incumbent
- Assumed office 19 April 2011

Personal details
- Born: 8 May 1984 (age 41) Halle (Saale)
- Party: Independent
- Other political affiliations: Party of Democratic Socialism (2000–2007); Die Linke (2007–2024)

Henriette Quade (born 8 May 1984 in Halle (Saale)) is a German politician serving as a member of the Landtag of Saxony-Anhalt since 2011. Until 2024, she was a member of Die Linke.
