= Lea Reisner =

German politician

Member of the Bundestag from North Rhine-Westphalia
- Incumbent
- Assumed office 2025

Personal details
- Born: 9 March 1989 (age 37) Wiesbaden
- Party: Die Linke

Lea Valeska Anissia Reisner (born 9 March 1989) is a German politician from Die Linke. In the 2025 German federal election, she was elected to the German Bundestag via her party's state list in North Rhine-Westphalia.

== Life ==
Lea Reisner graduated from high school in Wiesbaden in 2008. She is a nurse. Reisner worked as an operations manager and project coordinator in civilian maritime search and rescue. She describes herself as an anarchist.

== Political career ==
In the 2024 European Parliament election, she was ranked 9th on the Left Party's European election list, but missed out on a seat in the European Parliament. In the 2025 German federal election, she ran as a direct candidate in the Cologne II constituency and was nominated by The Left North Rhine-Westphalia state association to 3rd place on the state list. She received 8.6 percent of the first votes in the election, but was still able to enter the German Bundestag via her party's state list. Reisner's candidacy was supported by Brand New Bundestag.
