= Ulrich Thoden =

German politician

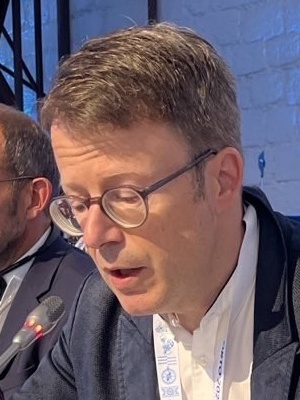
- Thoden in 2025

Member of the Bundestag from North Rhine-Westphalia
- Incumbent
- Assumed office 2025

Personal details
- Born: 16 May 1973 (age 53) Münster
- Party: Die Linke (since 2018)
- Other political affiliations: SPD (until 2018)
- Education: University of Münster

Ulrich Thoden (born 16 May 1973) is a German politician from Die Linke. He was elected to the German Bundestag via the North Rhine-Westphalia state list in the 2025 German federal election.

== Life and career ==
After graduating from the Ratsgymnasium in Münster in 1992, Thoden studied Catholic theology, among other subjects, at the University of Münster and graduated with honors in 1999. He passed the First State Examination for teaching at the secondary levels I and II in 2005 and the Second State Examination in 2008. Starting in 2006, Thoden taught at the Canisianum Gymnasium [de] in Lüdinghausen, where he taught English, Latin, Greek, and Catholic religious education; he also served as a homeroom teacher. From 2017 until his election to the 21st Bundestag in 2025, he worked as a teacher at the Rheine Vocational College in the Steinfurt district, where he taught English, Latin, philosophy, and Catholic religious education.

== Politics ==
Thoden was already politically active during his time at the Ratsgymnasium in Münster; for example, as student body president, he organized demonstrations against the First Gulf War in 1991. He was involved in peace activism and is a co-founder of the Münster Peace Cooperative (FriKo) [4][5]. In 2008, he joined the SPD and in 2016 ran in the party primary to succeed Münster SPD representative Christoph Strässer. In 2018, he joined Die Linke, serving as spokesperson for the Die Linke city council caucus in Münster from 2020 to 2024. From 2022 to 2025, he served as deputy state spokesperson for The Left Party in North Rhine-Westphalia, and since 2023, he has been a delegate for North Rhine-Westphalia to the Party Council. In addition, he has represented his party as a delegate to the European Left since 2025.

Thoden was a member of the State Spokesperson Council of the Communist Platform (KPF) and left this faction in 2026 due to "irreconcilable differences." He is active in the BAG Workplace and Trade Unions, the BAG Peace and International Politics, and the BAG Die Linke.queer.

On December 14, 2024, a general meeting was held at which Thoden was elected as the direct candidate in Constituency 127 (Steinfurt III). At the state representatives' assembly of Die Linke NRW on January 11, 2025, he was elected to fourth place on the state list for the 2025 federal election. In his electoral district, Die Linke received 6.0% of the first-preference votes and 6.4% of the second-preference votes.

Thoden is the chair of the Defense Committee and the defense policy spokesperson for the Die Linke parliamentary group in the German Bundestag. In addition, he is an alternate member of the Foreign Affairs Committee and the Budget Committee.

He serves as parliamentary secretary with special responsibilities for his parliamentary group and is a member of the Council of Elders.

Internationally, he represents the German Bundestag as a member of the German delegation to the OSCE Parliamentary Assembly and the NATO Parliamentary Assembly. He is also chair of the German-Pacific Parliamentary Group.

Thoden delivered his first speech in the German Bundestag on May 14, 2025, during the debate on the government's policy statement (defense).

Thoden's district office is located in Emsdetten. He also represents Gütersloh and Warendorf for The Left.

== Trade union activity ==
In addition to his political work, Thoden is active in the Education and Science Union (GEW). In 2017, he was elected chair of the GEW Münster City Chapter for the first time. In this role, he advocates for better working conditions in the education sector; in connection with the "Baustelle Bildung" campaign, he criticized unequal pay for teachers and called for more staff through better pay and improved working conditions.
