= Sascha H. Wagner =

German politician (born 1980)

Member of the Bundestag
- Incumbent
- Assumed office TBD
- Constituency: North Rhine-Westphalia

Personal details
- Born: 1980 (age 45–46)
- Party: The Left

Sascha Heribert Wagner (born 1980) is a German politician who was elected as a member of the Bundestag in 2025. He has served as leader of The Left in North Rhine-Westphalia since 2022.
