= Mirze Edis =

German politician

Member of the Bundestag
- Incumbent
- Assumed office 2025

Personal details
- Born: 1 January 1972 (age 54) Kars
- Party: the Left Party

Mirze Edis (born 1 January 1972 in Kars) is a German politician belonging to the Left Party. In the 2025 German federal election, he was elected to the German Bundestag.

Edis is married and has three children.
