= Jan Köstering =

German politician (born 1997)

Member of the Bundestag
- Incumbent
- Assumed office 25 March 2025
- Constituency: North Rhine-Westphalia

Personal details
- Born: 22 October 1997 (age 28) Ratingen, Germany
- Party: The Left
- Website: jan-koestering.de

Jan Tobias Köstering (born 22 October 1997) is a German politician and member of the Bundestag. A member of The Left, he has represented North Rhine-Westphalia since March 2025.

Köstering was born on 22 October 1997 in Ratingen. He was educated at the Dietrich Bonhoeffer Gymnasium in Ratingen. He was a member of the Young Socialists in the SPD (Jusos). He graduated from high school in 2016 and moved to Nümbrecht. He is a mechatronics engineer. He is a member of Rote Hilfe e.V., Association of Persecutees of the Nazi Regime – Federation of Antifascists (VVN-BdA), Unser Oberberg ist bunt and IG Metall.

Köstering joined The Left in 2017 and is a member of the party's state executive in North Rhine-Westphalia. He is a member of the Nümbrecht Municipal Council, Oberberg District Council and the part's spokesman in Oberberg. He contested the 2022 North Rhine-Westphalia state election but the party failed to win any seats in the Landtag of North Rhine-Westphalia. He was The Left's candidate in Oberbergischer Kreis (constituency 98) at the 2025 federal election but was not elected. He was however elected to the Bundestag on The Left's state list in North Rhine-Westphalia.
