= Katrin Fey =

German politician

Member of the Bundestag
- Incumbent
- Assumed office 2025

Personal details
- Born: 7 December 1967 (age 58) Remagen
- Party: the Left Party

Katrin Fey (born 7 December 1967 in Remagen) is a German politician belonging to the Left Party. In the 2025 German federal election, she was elected to the German Bundestag.
