= Sonja Lemke =

German politician (born 1991)

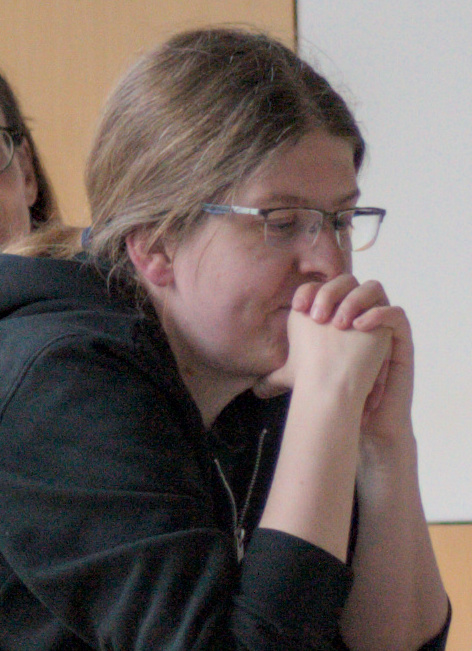

Member of the Bundestag
- Incumbent
- Assumed office 2025

Personal details
- Born: 22 November 1991 (age 34) Berlin
- Party: The Left Party

Sonja Janet Lemke (born November 22, 1991 in Berlin) is a German politician belonging to the Left Party. In the 2025 German federal election, she was elected to the German Bundestag. Sonja Lemke is a computer scientist.
