= Mareike Hermeier =

German politician (born 1989)

Member of the Bundestag
- Incumbent
- Assumed office 2025
- Constituency: North Rhine-Westphalia

Personal details
- Born: 17 August 1989 (age 36) Bielefeld, Germany
- Party: Die Linke

Mareike Hermeier (born 17 August 1989) is a German politician from Die Linke. In the 2025 German federal election, Hermeier ran as a direct candidate for the Steinfurt I – Borken I constituency and was elected to the German Bundestag in 11th place on the North Rhine-Westphalia state list.

Previously, Hermeier worked as a wholesale merchant.

== Life ==
Before the 2025 federal election, Hermeier was active in the district executive committee of the Steinfurt district association and a delegate to the federal party conference of The Left.

Hermeier is a single mother of one daughter.
