= Hüseyin Kenan Aydın =

German politician (1962–2026)

Hüseyin Kenan Aydın (22 October 1962 – 10 June 2026) was a German politician who was a member of Die Linke. From 2005 to 2009, he was a member of the German Bundestag.

== Early life ==
Hüseyin Kenan Aydın was born in Pülümür, Tunceli Province, Turkey on 22 October 1962.

== Professional career ==
In 1980 he was employed by Thyssen-Krupp. From 1991 to 2003 he was involved in the workers union IG Metall.

== Political career ==
From 1983 to 2005 he was affiliated with the Social Democratic Party of Germany (SPD). In 2005 he was member of the parliamentary group Die Linke. In 2007 he became member of the newly founded party Die Linke.

== Death ==
Aydin died on 10 June 2026, at the age of 63.
