= 2010 North Rhine-Westphalia state election =

German state election

- 9 May 2010

All 181 seats in the Landtag of North Rhine-Westphalia 91 seats needed for a majority
- Turnout: 7,870,412 (59.3% ▼3.7 pp)
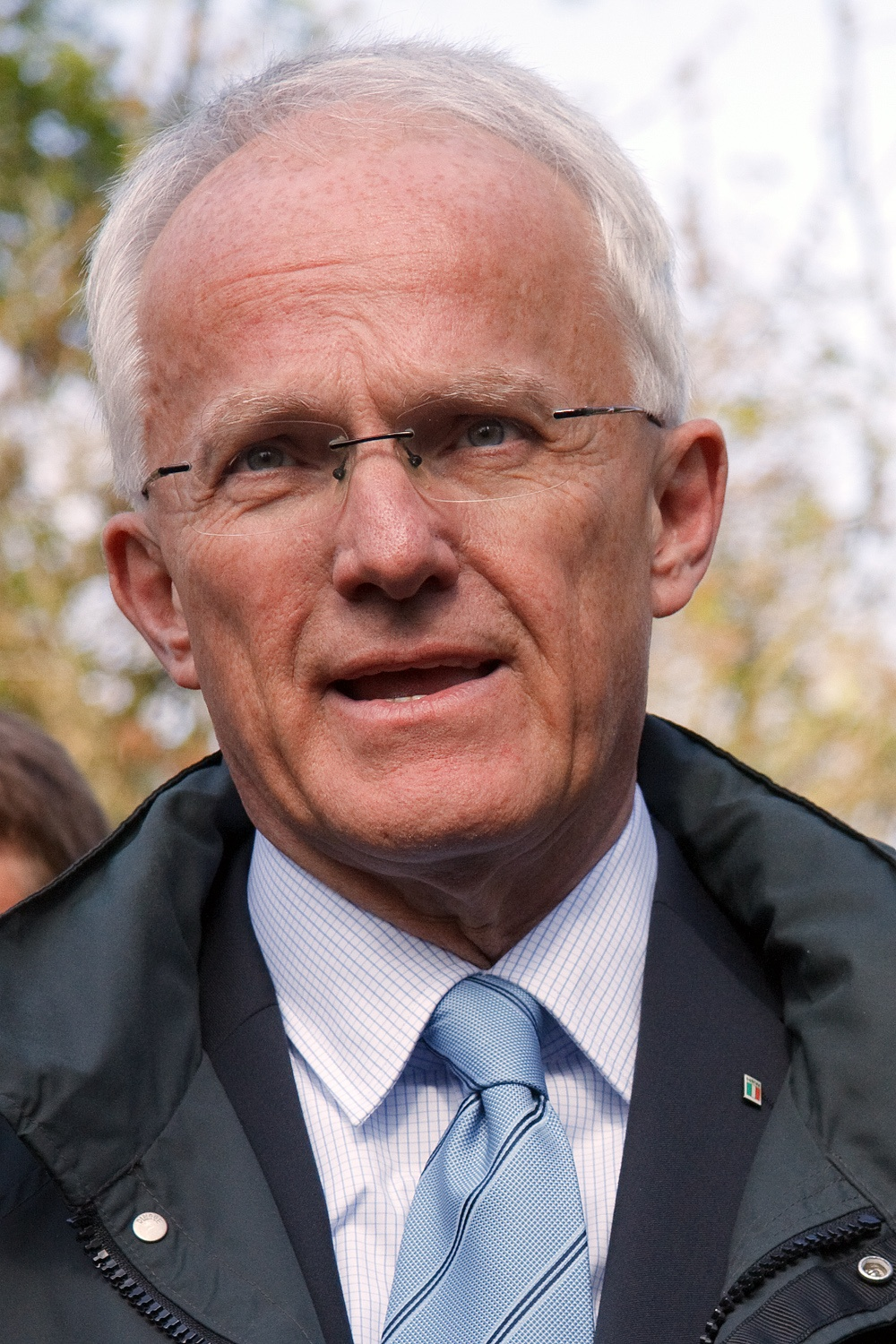

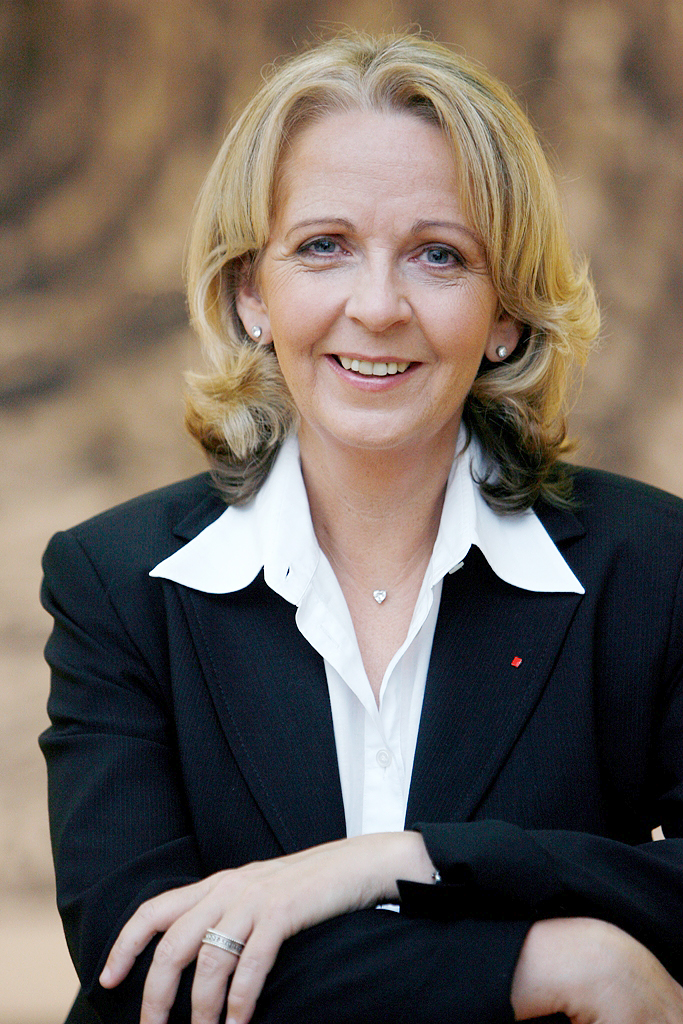

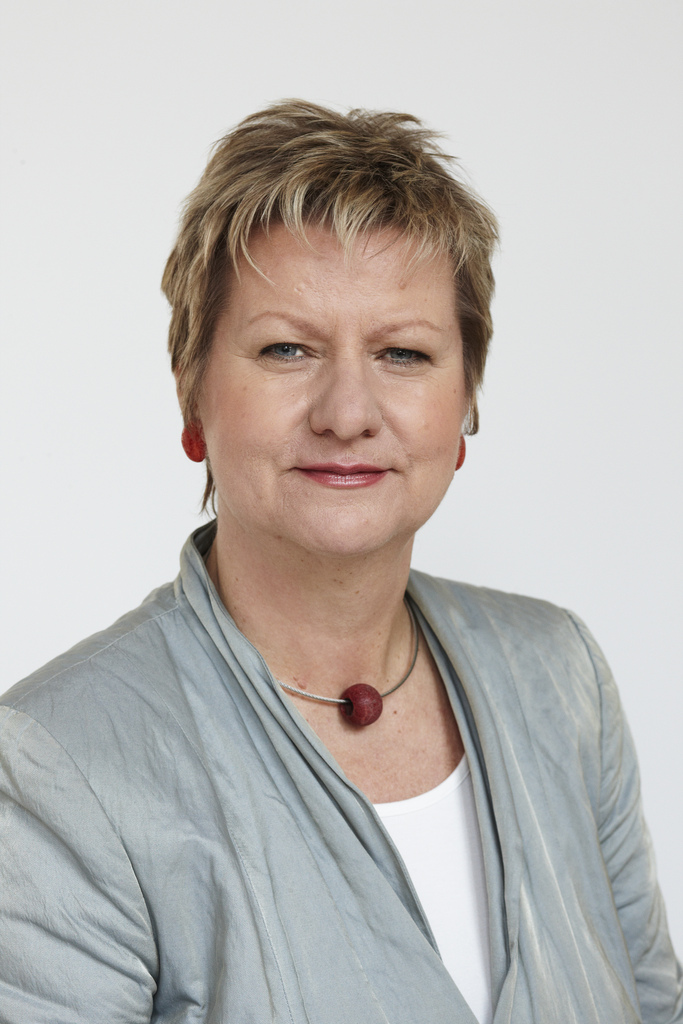

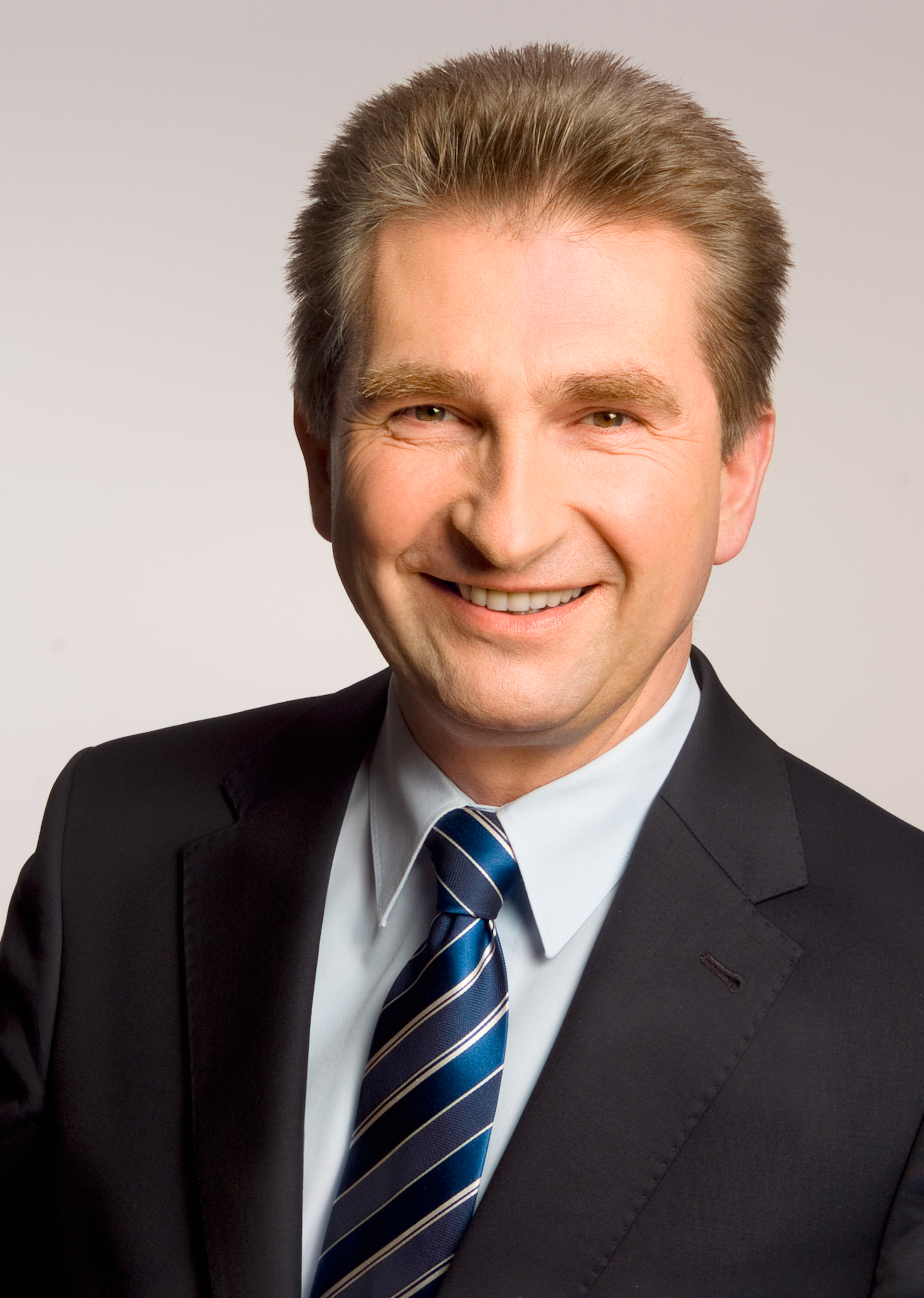

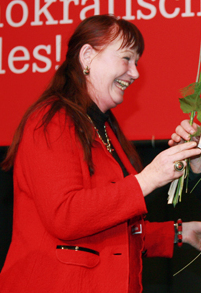
	First party	Second party	Third party
Candidate	Jürgen Rüttgers	Hannelore Kraft	Sylvia Löhrmann
Party	CDU	SPD	Greens
Last election	89 seats, 44.8%	74 seats, 37.1%	12 seats, 6.2%
Seats won	67	67	23
Seat change	▼22	▼7	▲11
Popular vote	2,681,700	2,675,818	941,162
Percentage	34.6%	34.5%	12.1%
Swing	▼10.3 pp	▼2.6 pp	▲5.9 pp
	Fourth party	Fifth party
Candidate	Andreas Pinkwart	Bärbel Beuermann
Party	FDP	Left
Last election	12 seats, 6.2%	0 seats, 3.1% (Note: Aggregated results for WASG (2.2%) and PDS (0.9%).)
Seats won	13	11
Seat change	▲1	▲11
Popular vote	522,229	435,627
Percentage	6.7%	5.6%
Swing	▲0.5 pp	▲2.5 pp
- Results for the single-member constituencies
Government before election
Rüttgers cabinet
CDU–FDP
Government after election
First Kraft cabinet
SPD–Green

The 2010 North Rhine-Westphalia state election was held on 9 May 2010 to elect the 15th Landtag of North Rhine-Westphalia. The outgoing government was a coalition of the Christian Democratic Union (CDU) and Free Democratic Party (FDP) led by Minister-President Jürgen Rüttgers.

The election was a defeat for the incumbent government, but failed to produce a clear outcome. The CDU suffered its worst-ever result, falling over ten percentage points to just 34.6%. The opposition Social Democratic Party (SPD) led by Hannelore Kraft also recorded a decline and finished just 0.1% behind the CDU; both parties tied on 67 seats. The Greens recorded their best result to date with 12%, while the FDP achieved a small swing to 6.7%. The newly-formed Left party won 5.6% and 11 seats. Neither the incumbent CDU–FDP government (80 seats) or prospective SDP–Green coalition (90 seats) achieved a majority in the Landtag, with The Left narrowly holding balance of power.

Complex talks took place between all five parties, with the CDU and SPD each aiming for a coalition with the Greens and FDP, or a grand coalition between the two of them. The SPD and Greens also held talks with The Left. All discussions ended without success by mid-June. On the 17th, the SPD and Greens announced they would attempt to form a minority government led by Hannelore Kraft. They ruled out a confidence arrangement with The Left, but nonetheless relied on the party's abstention for the government's investiture to succeed. Kraft was elected Minister-President on 14 July on the second ballot, which required only a simple majority, with 90 votes in favour, 80 against, and eleven abstentions.

== Electoral system ==
The Landtag is elected via mixed-member proportional representation. 128 members are elected in single-member constituencies via first-past-the-post voting. 53 members are then allocated using compensatory proportional representation. Voters have two votes: the "first vote" for candidates in single-member constituencies, and the "second vote" for party lists, which are used to fill the remaining seats in a way that achieves proportionality overall. The minimum size of the Landtag is 181 members, but if overhang seats are present, proportional leveling seats will be added to ensure proportionality. An electoral threshold of 5% of valid votes is applied to the Landtag; parties that fall below this threshold are ineligible to receive seats. This was the first state election in which voters had two votes.

== Background ==
In the previous election held on 22 May 2005, the SPD suffered a landslide defeat and was ousted from government for the first time since 1966. They received only 37% of votes while the CDU emerged in a strong first place with almost 45%; the FDP and Greens each took 6%. The CDU and FDP subsequently formed a coalition government under Jürgen Rüttgers.

== Parties ==
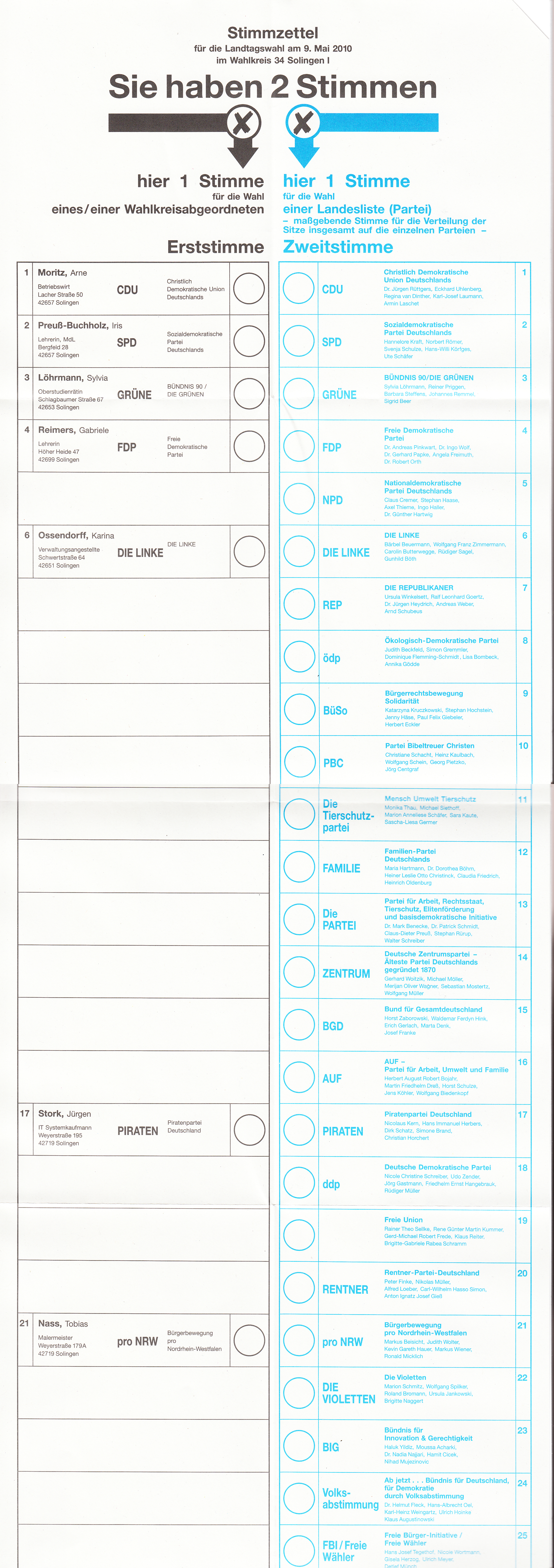
A sample ballot for the Solingen I constituency, showcasing the new voting system

The table below lists parties represented in the 14th Landtag of North Rhine-Westphalia.

Name		Ideology	Lead candidate	2005 result	
Name		Ideology	Lead candidate	Votes (%)	Seats
CDU	Christian Democratic Union of Germany; Christlich Demokratische Union Deutschlands	Christian democracy	Jürgen Rüttgers	44.8%	89 / 187
SPD	Social Democratic Party of Germany; Sozialdemokratische Partei Deutschlands	Social democracy	Hannelore Kraft	37.1%	74 / 187
GRÜNE	Alliance 90/The Greens; Bündnis 90/Die Grünen	Green politics	Sylvia Löhrmann	6.2%	12 / 187
FDP	Free Democratic Party; Freie Demokratische Partei	Classical liberalism	Andreas Pinkwart	6.2%	12 / 187

A total of 25 parties ran state lists in the election. Due to the newly-introduced two vote system, parties were able to stand their lists on ballots statewide without running candidates in every constituency, as had been the case previously. 1,000 signatures were required for a party to run a state list. In addition to the parties running lists, some stood only constituency candidates. A number of independent candidates also ran.

== Campaign ==
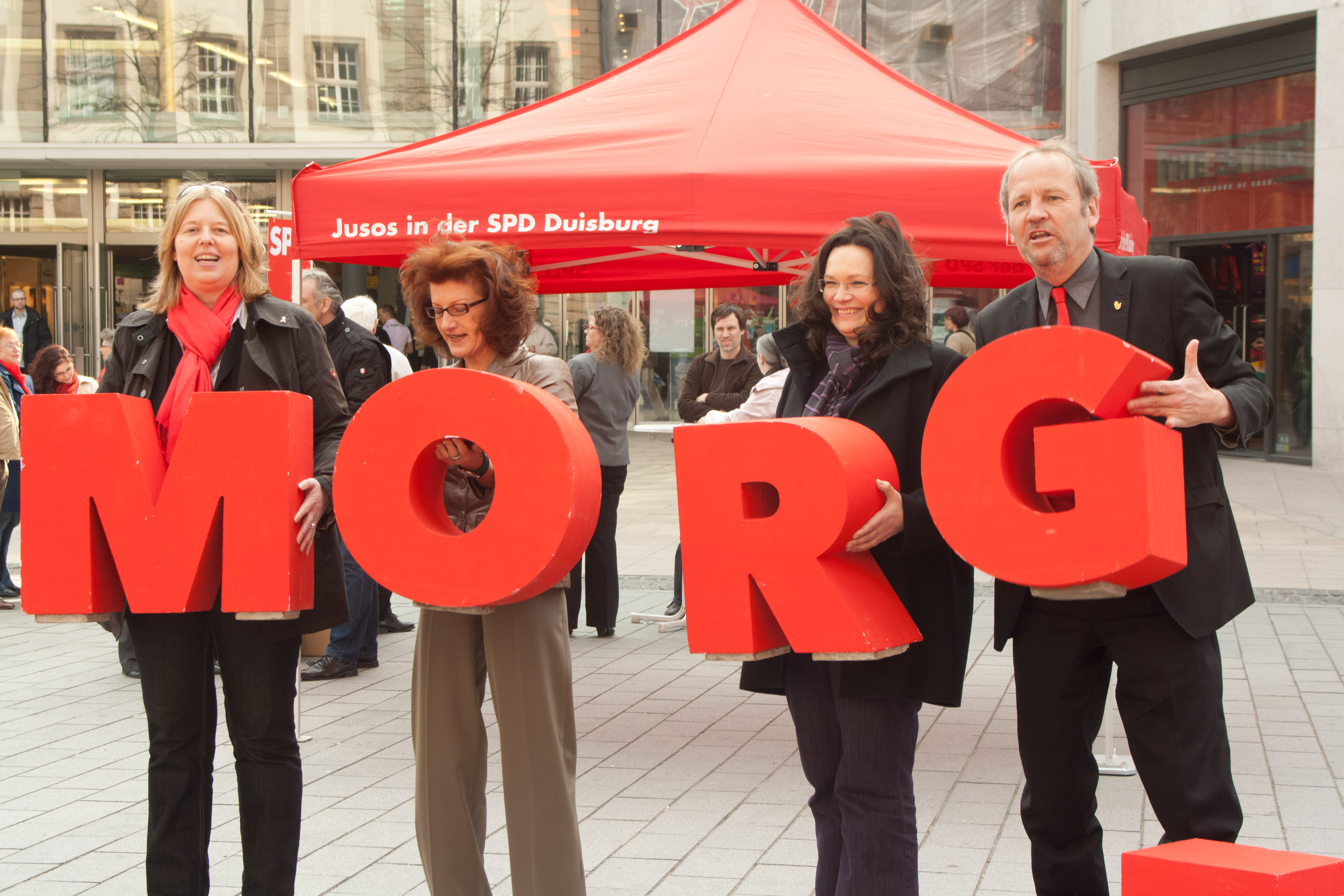
An SPD campaign event in Duisburg with Bärbel Bas (first from the left) and Andrea Nahles (third from the left)

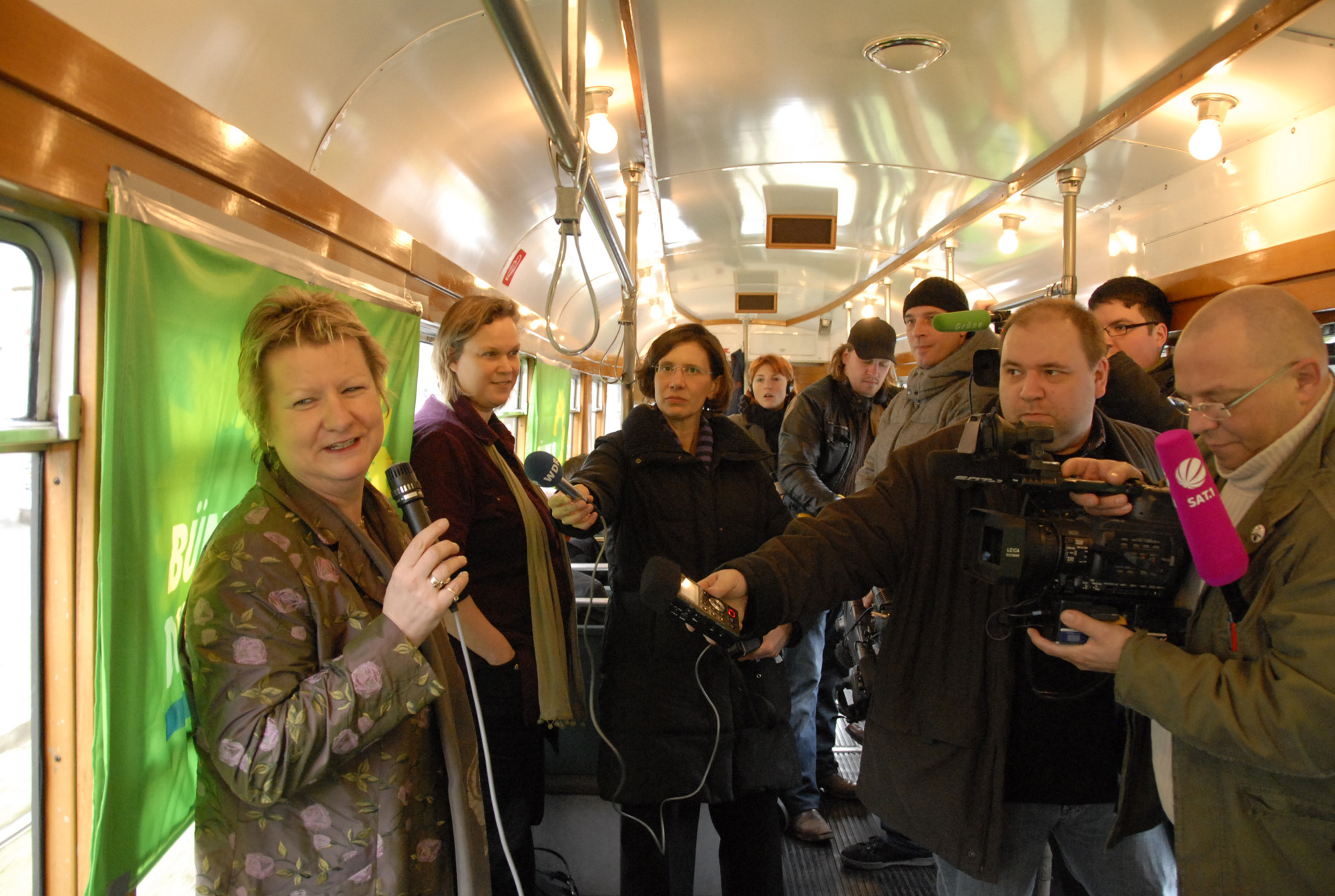
Sylvia Löhrmann addressing media on a tram during the campaign

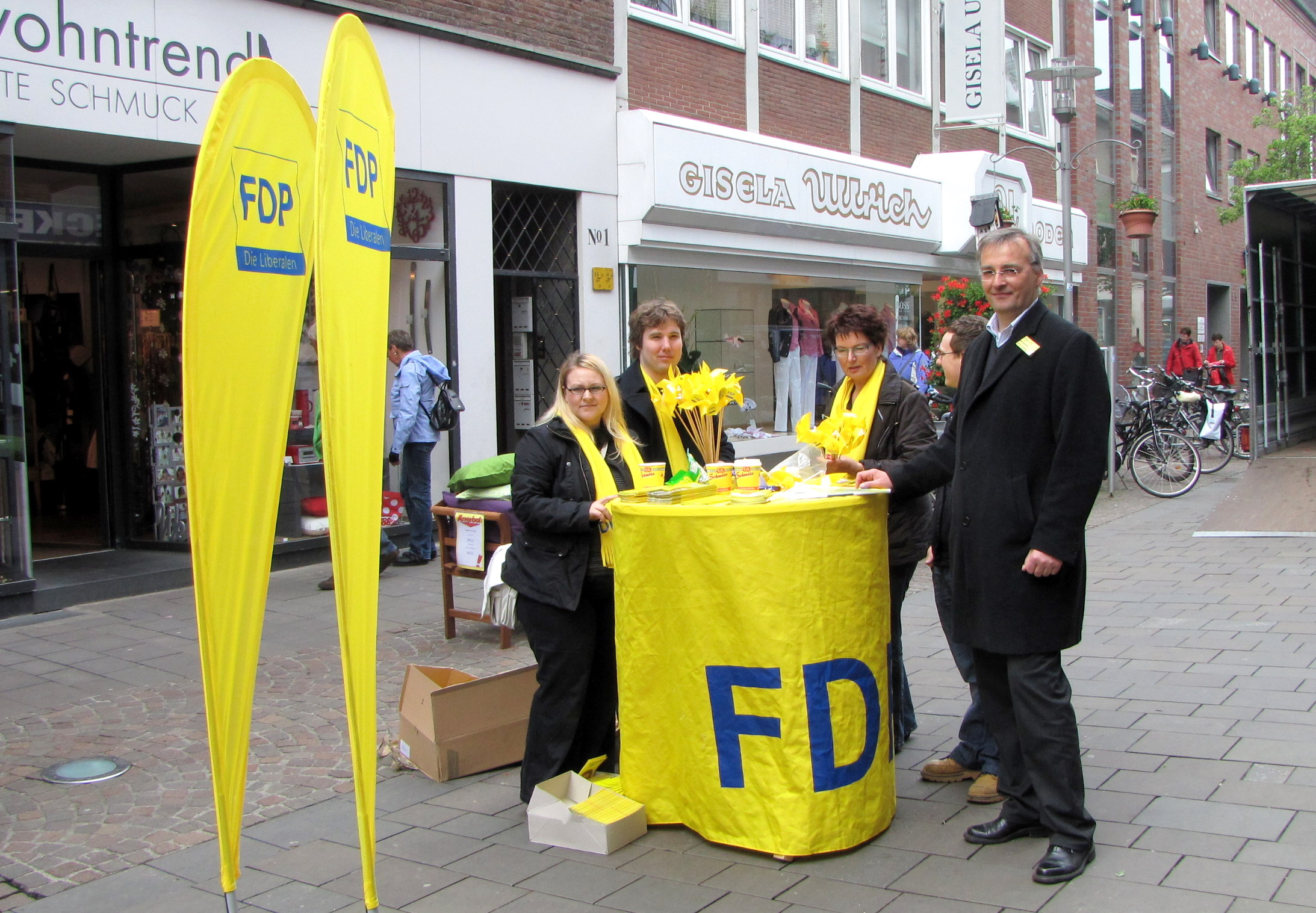
An FDP campaign stand in Bocholt on election day

Education policy was an important topic in the election campaign. The government wanted to retain the existing three-tier school system, and pointed out that during their tenure attendance had improved and many new teaching positions had been created. The opposition criticised the state's poor performance in PISA studies, and campaigned for the establishment of schools which integrated more younger and older students to improve efficiency, as well as the abolition of tuition fees.

The CDU was embroiled in a financing scandal in the lead up to the campaign, with companies accused of paying bribes in exchange for meetings with Minister-President Rüttgers. A Bundestag investigation found no violation of party finance laws. Shortly before the election, another scandal surfaced in which the CDU was accused of covertly commissioning a voters' initiative from a non-partisan communications agency, with the fundraising money allegedly used to pay for pro-Rüttgers newspaper ads under non-party branding. The allegations were sourced from intercepted emails from the NRW CDU and published mostly anonymously online. The CDU lodged a complaint with the state prosecutor over data breaches, but attributed the accusations to a malicious defamation campaign.

Federal issues also impacted the campaign. A new federal coalition of the CDU and FDP had taken office about six months earlier. If the state government was defeated, the federal government would lose its majority in the Bundesrat, the upper house whose members mirror the composition of each state government. This could prevent the government from implementing some of its proposed projects, including a controversial possible extension to the lifespan of some nuclear power plants, which the SPD and Greens pointed out. The federal government also delayed releasing its tax and budget plans until after the state election, which was widely criticised as a political play to avoid backlash from anticipated spending cuts. Just a few weeks before the election, the government also agreed to help finance a €110 billion EU bailout of the Greek government-debt crisis.

The Left also campaigned heavily on federal issues, criticising the social policy of both the federal CDU and former SPD governments, ongoing German involvement in the War in Afghanistan, and the consequences of the 2008 financial crisis. Despite being mostly a federal responsibility, employment and labour policy were also an important issue in the election; the left-wing opposition parties called for the establishment of a minimum wage, which the CDU and FDP opposed. Both Rüttgers and Kraft distanced themselves from controversial federal social policy such as the Hartz IV programme.

Polls ahead of the election indicated that The Left was likely to enter the Landtag, while the two major parties were likely to suffer losses collectively. This continued the trend in recent years of dwindling support for the traditional parties and an increasingly fractured parliamentary landscape with difficult majorities. The FDP was the only party to commit to a single option to the exclusion of all others: a continuation of the incumbent government. The CDU also campaigned to continue the coalition, but left the option of cooperation with the Greens open. The SPD expressed a preference for a coalition with the Greens but otherwise refused to draw hard lines. The Greens favoured the SPD, but likewise did not rule out working with the CDU. Relations with The Left were a sticking point: the CDU and FDP viewed cooperation as impossible, while the Greens and SPD left their options more open. However, the Greens did rule out a confidence and supply arrangement, and the SPD regularly denounced them as incapable of governing. For their part, The Left stated their willingness to join a coalition with the SPD and Greens and support Hannelore Kraft as Minister-President.

== Opinion polling ==
Polling firm	Fieldwork date	Sample size	CDU	SPD	Grüne	FDP	Linke	Others	Lead
2010 state election	9 May 2010	–	34.6	34.5	12.1	6.7	5.6	6.5	0.1
YouGov	30 Apr–6 May 2010	1,007	35	35.5	10.5	7	7	5	0.5
Emnid	28 Apr–5 May 2010	1,000	37	33	12	8	5	5	4
Forsa	3–5 May 2010	1,005	37	37	10	6	5	5	Tie
GMS	3–4 May 2010	1,001	37	33	12	7	6	5	4
Emnid	21–29 Apr 2010	1,033	38	33	11	8	6	4	5
Forschungsgruppe Wahlen	27–29 Apr 2010	1,080	35	33.5	11	8.5	6	6	1.5
Infratest dimap	27–29 Apr 2010	1,000	37.5	33	10	7.5	5.5	4.5	4.5
Forsa	19–23 Apr 2010	1,004	39	33	10	7	6	5	6
Emnid	12–20 Apr 2010	1,038	38	34	11	8	6	3	4
OmniQuest	19–22 Apr 2010	1,000	37.5	36.8	12.8	5.1	4.8	2.9	0.7
Forsa	12–17 Apr 2010	1,009	38	34	9	8	6	5	4
Forsa	6–9 Apr 2010	1,003	39	34	11	6	5	5	5
Infratest dimap	7–10 Apr 2010	1,000	38	34	12	7	6	3	4
GMS	5–6 Apr 2010	1,002	39	32	12	7	6	4	7
Emnid	15–31 Mar 2010	1,047	38	32	12	8	7	3	6
Emnid	18–22 Mar 2010	996	38	32	11	8	7	4	6
Forschungsgruppe Wahlen	15–17 Mar 2010	1,091	37	33	12	8	6	4	4
Emnid	5–11 Mar 2010	1,000	37	33	12	8	7	3	4
Infratest dimap	1–3 Mar 2010	1,000	35	33	13	10	6	3	2
Forsa	22–26 Feb 2010	1,016	38	34	11	6	6	5	4
GMS	18–20 Feb 2010	1,003	39	31	12	7	6	5	8
Forsa	20–29 Jan 2010	1,047	41	32	11	6	5	5	9
Infratest dimap	19–21 Jan 2010	1,000	36	32	12	9	6	5	4
Forsa	4–15 Jan 2010	1,121	42	31	11	6	5	5	11
Infratest dimap	17–19 Nov 2009	1,000	36	30	11	10	8	5	6
Forsa	2–13 Nov 2009	1,022	41	31	9	9	6	4	10
GMS	21–28 Jul 2009	1,002	39	29	9	12	5	6	10
Infratest dimap	10–11 Jun 2009	1,000	38	27	12	14	6	3	11
Forsa	13–30 Apr 2009	1,283	42	30	8	11	5	4	12
Infratest dimap	24–26 Feb 2009	1,000	40	28	10	12	7	3	12
Forsa	19–30 Jan 2009	1,078	42	26	9	13	6	4	16
Emnid	29 Jan 2009	?	38	30	9	12	9	?	8
Infratest dimap	8–9 Oct 2008	1,000	37	30	10	12	9	2	7
Forsa	24 Sep–2 Oct 2008	1,017	41	30	8	10	7	4	11
Forsa	31 Jul–12 Aug 2008	970	44	27	8	10	7	4	17
Forsa	21–30 Jul 2008	867	42	30	8	10	6	4	12
Forsa	26 May–6 Jun 2008	1,054	44	27	8	9	8	4	17
Forsa	5–16 May 2008	1,216	42	29	9	9	7	4	13
Forsa	17–28 Mar 2008	1,386	43	29	8	8	8	4	14
Infratest dimap	25–27 Mar 2008	1,000	41	31	10	9	6	3	10
Emnid	25–28 Feb 2008	1,000	41	32	8	8	8	?	9
Forsa	28 Jan–5 Feb 2008	1,014	42	33	6	8	7	4	9
Emnid	2 Feb 2008	?	39	35	8	9	6	3	4
Infratest dimap	6–8 Nov 2007	1,000	40	34	8	9	6	3	6
Emnid	2–8 Nov 2007	1,000	40	33	8	9	7	3	7
Forsa	22 Oct–5 Nov 2007	1,418	45	31	7	7	6	4	14
Forsa	30 Aug–11 Sep 2007	1,157	44	29	8	8	6	5	15
Emnid	31 Jul–4 Aug 2007	1,000	38	31	9	11	8	3	7
Infratest dimap	31 Jul–2 Aug 2007	1,000	38	35	9	9	6	3	3
Emnid	23–28 Apr 2007	1,000	39	32	11	12	–	6	7
Emnid	2–5 Mar 2007	1,000	38	33	12	11	–	6	5
Emnid	4–16 Jan 2007	1,000	39	33	11	12	3	2	6
Infratest dimap	9–11 Jan 2007	1,000	38	36	9	9	4	4	2
Forsa	17 Oct 2006	1,932	41	31	8	11	5	4	10
Emnid	11–12 Aug 2006	1,000	40	34	9	9	3	5	6
Infratest dimap	8–10 Aug 2006	1,000	39	35	9	10	4	3	4
Forsa	10–18 Jul 2006	1,055	43	32	7	10	5	3	11
GMS	12–14 May 2006	1,001	42	38	7	7	3	3	4
Infratest dimap	16–18 May 2006	1,000	43	34	6	10	4	3	9
Forsa	8–16 May 2006	1,001	41	33	8	9	5	4	8
Emnid	8–12 May 2006	1,002	40	35	7	8	4	6	5
Infratest dimap	13–15 Dec 2005	1,000	42	36	8	7	4	3	6
Infratest dimap	16–18 Aug 2005	1,000	45	34	7	6	5	3	11
2005 state election	22 May 2005	–	44.8	37.1	6.2	6.2	3.1 (Note: Results for WASG (2.2%) and PDS (0.9%).)	2.6	7.7

== Results ==
Due to the electoral reform that took place in this election, no swing is given for the constituency vote except for independents. Swing values for the party list vote are compared to the single vote from the 2005 election.

Graph of the party split among 181 seats.
Party	Constituency				Party list				Total seats	+/–
Party	Votes	%	+/–	Seats	Votes	%	+/–	Seats	Total seats	+/–
Christian Democratic Union (CDU)	2,983,788	38.54	–	67	2,681,700	34.56	–10.28	0	67	–22
Social Democratic Party (SPD)	2,980,311	38.50	–	61	2,675,818	34.48	–2.63	6	67	–7
Alliance 90/The Greens (GRÜNE)	784,826	10.14	–	0	941,162	12.13	+5.95	23	23	+11
Free Democratic Party (FDP)	363,895	4.70	–	0	522,229	6.73	+0.56	13	13	+1
The Left (LINKE)	415,241	5.36	–	0	435,627	5.61	+2.51	11	11	+11
Pirate Party Germany (Piraten)	70,610	0.91	New	0	121,046	1.56	New	0	0	New
Citizens' Movement pro NRW (Pro NRW)	67,310	0.87	New	0	107,476	1.38	New	0	0	New
National Democratic Party (NPD)	24,685	0.32	–	0	55,400	0.71	–0.19	0	0	±0
Human Environment Animal Protection Party (Tierschutzpartei)	5,093	0.07	–	0	48,099	0.62	+0.55	0	0	±0
Pensioners' Party (Rentner)	7,098	0.09	New	0	38,423	0.50	New	0	0	New
Family Party of Germany (FAMILIE)	8,168	0.11	–	0	31,758	0.41	+0.36	0	0	±0
The Republicans (REP)	4,876	0.06	–	0	23,330	0.30	–0.52	0	0	±0
Alliance for Innovation and Justice (BIG)	2,832	0.04	New	0	13,863	0.18	New	0	0	New
Party of Bible-abiding Christians (PBC)	232	0.00	–	0	9,416	0.12	+0.04	0	0	±0
Die PARTEI	473	0.01	–	0	9,247	0.12	+0.10	0	0	±0
From now... Alliance for Germany Party	1,487	0.02	New	0	7,787	0.10	New	0	0	New
Ecological Democratic Party (ÖDP)	2,770	0.04	–	0	7,505	0.10	–0.09	0	0	±0
Free Citizens Initiative/Free Voters (FBI)	512	0.01	New	0	6,636	0.09	New	0	0	New
Centre Party (ZENTRUM)	2,987	0.04	–	0	5,976	0.08	+0.06	0	0	±0
The Violets (VIOLETTEN)	196	0.00	New	0	5,968	0.08	New	0	0	New
Party for Labour, Environment and Family (AUF)	2,402	0.03	New	0	5,173	0.07	New	0	0	New
Civil Rights Movement Solidarity (BüSo)	7,164	0.09	–	0	3,370	0.04	–0.04	0	0	±0
Free Union (FU)	576	0.01	New	0	1,443	0.02	New	0	0	New
German Democratic Party (DDP)					1,422	0.02	New	0	0	New
League for All-Germany (BGD)	15	0.00	–	0	672	0.01	+0.01	0	0	±0
Social Centre	754	0.01	New	0					0	New
The Westphalians	473	0.01	New	0					0	New
Social Justice North Rhine-Westphalia (SG-NRW)	347	0.00	New	0					0	New
German Communist Party (DKP)	197	0.00	New	0					0	New
Independent Workers' Party (UAP)	108	0.00	–	0					0	±0
Ecological Left (ÖkoLinX)	100	0.00	–	0					0	±0
Liberal Democrats (LD)	95	0.00	–	0					0	±0
German Party (DP)	67	0.00	New	0					0	New
Independents	2,267	0.03	–0.03	0					0	±0
Total	7,741,955	100.00	–	128	7,760,546	100.00	–	53	181	–6
Valid votes	7,741,955	98.37			7,760,546	98.60				
Invalid/blank votes	128,457	1.63			109,866	1.40				
Total votes	7,870,412	100.00			7,870,412	100.00				
Registered voters/turnout	13,267,052	59.32			13,267,052	59.32				

== Aftermath ==
=== Analysis ===
Exit polling by Forschungsgruppe Wahlen indicated that state politics was primary for most voters. 55% said it was most important in their voting decision, while 41% said federal politics was more important, and only 15% said their vote was a protest against the federal government. An overwhelming majority of voters (78%) named education as an important issue, alongside the Greek debt crisis (56%). Only 38% considered CDU finance scandals important. According to Infratest dimap polling, economic development, education, and budget deficits were the most important issues. The SPD was considered more competent in the areas of education and social welfare, while the CDU led in economics and finance. Compared to the 2005 election, while the issue of employment lost salience, perception of the SPD's competence in the area recovered while the CDU's declined.

Jürgen Rüttgers had particularly poor personal ratings. Forschungsgruppe Wahlen found that only 40% of voters preferred him as Minister-President compared to 43% for Hannelore Kraft, an unusual result in Germany where incumbents are typically favoured over challengers, even in close elections. Kraft was rated as more persuasive, sympathetic, and in-touch. Nonetheless, a majority of voters placed more importance on programme and policy when voting, with only one-sixth choosing the lead candidates as the decisive factor. The CDU and SPD did poorly among young voters, who voted strongly for the Greens and non-parliamentary minor parties. Voters over 60 gave much more support to the major parties, particularly the CDU.

=== Government formation ===
The incumbent CDU–FDP government lost its majority by a wide margin, taking 80 of the 181 seats. However, a prospective SPD–Green coalition came up just one seat short of a majority with 90 seats of the 91 required. There were four plausible majority coalitions: a grand coalition between the CDU and SPD (134 seats), a CDU–Green–FDP "Jamaica" coalition or SPD–Green–FDP "traffic light" coalition (both 103 seats), or an SPD–Green–Left "red-green-red" coalition (101 seats). The CDU aimed for a Jamaica coalition or grand coalition, while the SPD hoped, in order of preference, for a traffic light, red-green-red, or grand coalition.

The prospect of a grand coalition was complicated by the extremely narrow margin of the election: both major parties took 67 seats in the Landtag, and the question of who would serve as Minister-President was disputed. Rüttgers insisted he would continue in office since the CDU won more votes than the SPD, while Kraft insisted that she should take over given the harsh losses of the CDU.

The SPD first approached the Greens for discussions, with the intention of then seeking a third partner – either the FDP or Left, with a preference for the former. On the morning of the 14th, they sent invitations to both. The Left accepted, but the FDP declined, with leader Andreas Pinkwart stating: "The offer from the SPD and the Greens obviously lacks any seriousness, otherwise the Left Party would not have been invited on the same day. ... The traffic light and Jamaica are no longer coalition options." After the first meeting between the SPD–Green bloc and Left on the 20th, Hannelore Kraft announced that talks had been unsuccessful. She cited problematic sentiments about East Germany and a lack of willingness to take responsibility by The Left as factors. The SPD then invited the CDU to talks for a grand coalition, while the Greens withdrew in the expectation that they would remain in opposition.

After three rounds of meetings, the SPD withdrew from talks on 2 June citing a lack of compromise from the CDU. Kraft said they were unwilling to change policy or personnel, while Rüttgers insisted that only a few contentious issues remained. The previous day, the FDP had reversed their position and announced they were open to talks for a traffic light coalition. The three parties met on 8 June, and again on the 10th for about ten hours. The next day, the FDP announced that talks had failed: they had not been able to reconcile their positions, most especially with the Greens on education policy, and felt the demands of the SPD and Greens were too harsh. On 12 June, after a one-on-one meeting between Rüttgers and Kraft about a grand coalition, the SPD executive voted not to pursue further coalition options and instead withdraw into opposition. Kraft said that they would attempt to garner majorities for legislation on the floor of the Landtag. This was received poorly by the other parties, including the Greens, who called for a minority government.

On 17 June, the SPD reversed its position and Kraft announced that they would indeed attempt to form a minority government with the Greens. Shortly before, FDP leader Pinkwart had told the Westdeutsche Allgemeine Zeitung that the coalition between the CDU and FDP had run its course, and that his party would push for "majority decisions in the interest of the state" in the Landtag. Reportedly, the SPD leadership saw this as the effective end of Rüttgers' government, which had been operating in a caretaker capacity since the election, and strengthened the likelihood of investing an SPD minority government. Though they hoped for cooperation from the FDP, the party executive unanimously decided on 22 June to vote against Kraft in the investiture and oppose a red-green government.

Minority governments are possible in North Rhine-Westphalia due to the procedure for electing the Minister-President: the initial hurdle for election is an absolute majority (a majority of all members) in favour, but after a certain number of failed ballots it is reduced to a simple majority (a majority of all votes cast). Since the SPD and Greens together held more seats than the CDU and FDP, they would be able to win so long as The Left abstained. The SPD and Greens did not consult The Left and rejected suggestions that they were relying on them, but once they FDP made it clear that they would vote against Kraft, they did tacitly require tolerance from The Left or their government would fail. The SPD and Greens quickly concluded a coalition agreement, with both parties ratifying it on 10 July.

The investiture took place on 14 July. Hannelore Kraft, proposed by the SPD and Greens, was the only candidate. In the first ballot, she received 90 votes in favour, 81 against, and ten abstentions, suggesting that one Left deputy voted against. The second ballot required only a simple majority. Kraft was elected with 90 votes in favour, 80 against, and eleven abstentions.

=== Landtag ===
The new Landtag met for its inaugural session on 9 June. By convention, the largest party nominates the presiding officer (President of the Landtag), but the tie in seats between the CDU and SPD made it unclear who had the right. The two parties were also concerned that the selection of the president could affect the outcome of government negotiations. They agreed to put off the question by exploiting a constitutional loophole: if no new presiding officer is elected at the inaugural session, the outgoing president from the previous term remains in office. They convened the council of elders of the previous Landtag to remove the election of the presiding officer from the agenda of the inaugural session, claiming there were no applicants. Outgoing president Regina van Dinther (CDU) thus remained in office and chaired the inaugural session. However, she had lost her seat in the election and resigned the presidency effective at the conclusion of the 9 June session. The office thus passed to outgoing first vice-president Edgar Moron (SPD), who had also lost his seat; though he was no longer a member of the Landtag, he served acting president until 17 July, when Eckhard Uhlenberg (CDU) was finally elected. This situation was harshly criticised in the Frankfurter Allgemeine Zeitung by Patrick Bahners, who labeled it an act of "self-rejection" contrary to the principles of democracy.
