= Islam in Germany =

History and demographics of Islam in Germany

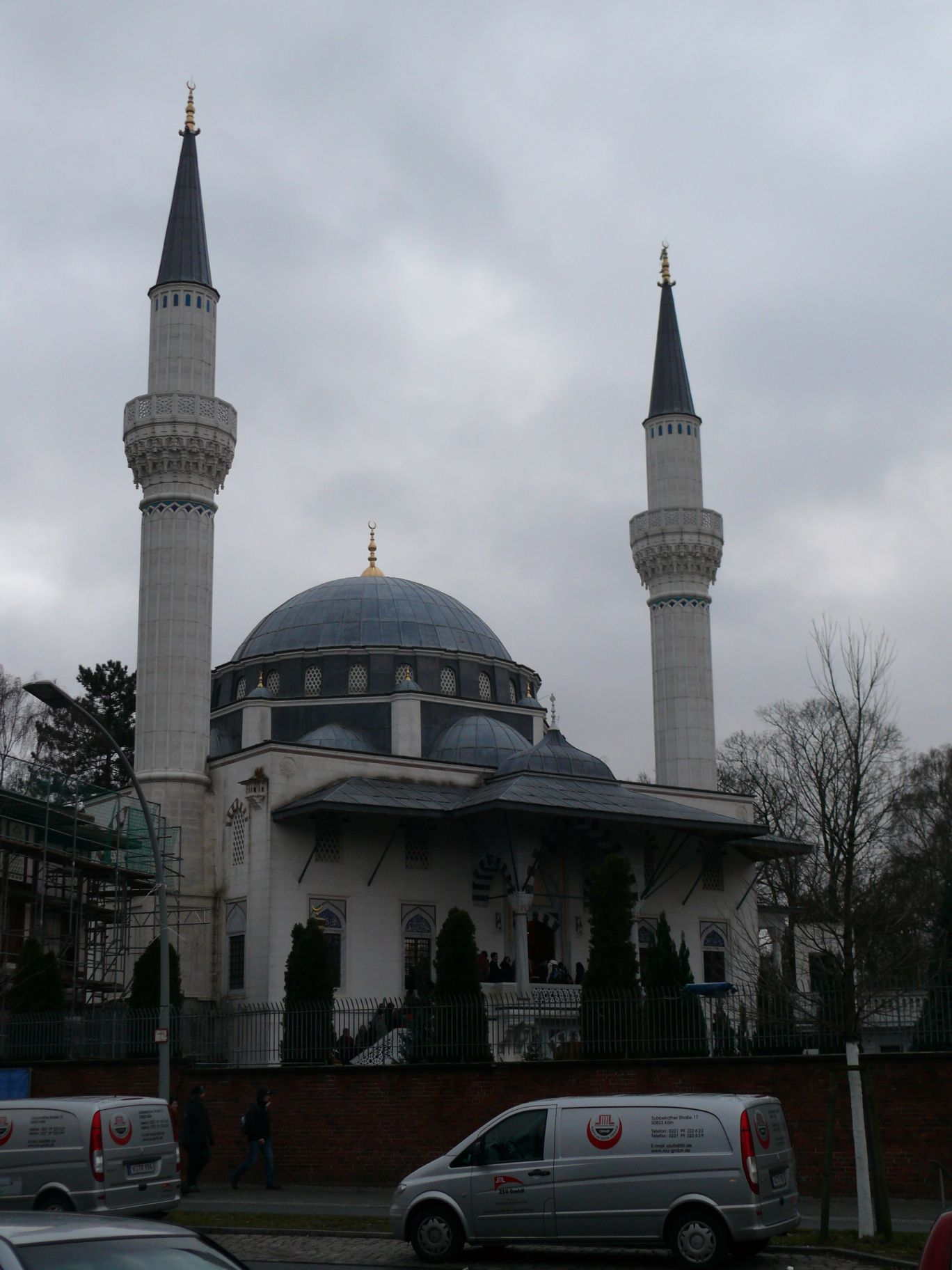
- Şehitlik Mosque, Berlin

Total population
- Between 6.6–7.0 million (8.0 - 8.5%) in 2025

Regions with significant populations
- Berlin, Hamburg, North Rhine-Westphalia, Baden-Württemberg, Bavaria, Hesse, Lower Saxony (incl. Bremen)

Religions
- Sunni Islam (majority), Alevism, Shia Islam

Languages
- Main: German, Farsi, Arabic, Turkish, Urdu, Bosnian, Albanian

Islam in Europe by percentage of country population 95–100%: Azerbaijan; 90–95%: Turkey; Kosovo; 50–70%: Albania; Bosnia and Herzegovina; Kazakhstan; 30–35%: North Macedonia; 10–20%: France; Sweden; Georgia; Montenegro; 5–10%: Austria; Belgium; Bulgaria; Denmark; Germany; Liechtenstein; Luxembourg; Netherlands; Russia; Switzerland; United Kingdom; Spain; Greece; 4–5%: Serbia; 2–4%: Italy; Finland; Norway; Malta; Slovenia; Cyprus (Note: Only takes into account the Muslim population residing on land controlled by the Republic of Cyprus.); 1–2%: Croatia; Ireland; Ukraine; Andorra; < 1%: Iceland; Armenia; Belarus; Czech Republic; Estonia; Hungary; Latvia; Lithuania; Moldova; Monaco; Poland; Portugal; Romania; San Marino; Slovakia

Islam's significance in Germany increased after the labour migration in the 1960s and several waves of political refugees since the 1970s. In 2025, there were 6.6– 7 million Muslims with a migrant background (Note: A migrant background was defined as having been born or having at least one parent born in a country from a prespecified list of countries with a significant Muslim population, or as having citizenship or having at least one parent with citizenship of one of these countries) in Germany (8 to 8.5% of the population), in addition to Muslims who do not fit into that category.

According to a 2025 estimate by the Federal Office for Migration and Refugees, between 6.6 and 7.0 million Muslims with a migration background from Muslim-majority countries lived in Germany, corresponding to around 8.0 to 8.5% of the total population.

A similar survey in 2016 estimated a number of 4.4–4.7 million Muslims with a migrant background (5.4 – 5.7% of the population) at that time. A survey in 2009 estimated a total number of up to 4.3 million Muslims in Germany. There are also higher estimates: according to the German Islam Conference, Muslims represented 7% of the population in Germany in 2012.

In 2014, it was estimated that 20,000-100,000 Germans converted to Islam, numbers comparable to those in France and in the United Kingdom.

== Methodological issues ==
Germany does not register the religion of individuals in a centralized or mandatory system. Religious affiliation is only recorded if a person is a registered member of a recognized religious community, such as for purposes of church tax ("Kirchensteuer"). Many people of Muslim background in Germany are not affiliated with a mosque or Islamic organization, and may be secular, agnostic, atheist, or have converted to another religion.

Estimates of the Muslim population in Germany often rely on the assumption that individuals from Muslim-majority countries are Muslim. The Federal Office for Migration and Refugees (BAMF) notes that between 5.3 and 5.6 million individuals with a migration background from predominantly Muslim countries reside in Germany. However, this figure may not account for the diverse religious identities and beliefs of these individuals.

Some refugees in Germany fled their home countries due to persecution related to blasphemy or apostasy. In Afghanistan and Iraq, individuals who renounce Islam or are accused of blasphemy face severe penalties, including the death penalty.

The Central Council of Ex-Muslims has highlighted the plight of non-religious individuals and converts who face discrimination and danger in their countries of origin.

== Demographics ==
Islam is the largest minority religion in the country, with the Protestant and Roman Catholic confessions being the majority religions. Most Muslims in Germany have roots in Turkey, followed by Arab countries, former Yugoslavia (mostly of Kosovo-Albanian or Bosnian origin), as well as Iranic countries (Afghanistan, Tajikistan, Pakistan, Kurdistan & Iran). There is also a significant West African minority (mostly Gambia and Togo) and a noticeable East African community. The large majority of Muslims live in former West Germany, including West Berlin. However, unlike in most other European countries, sizeable Muslim communities exist in some rural regions of Germany, especially Baden-Württemberg, Hesse and parts of Bavaria and North Rhine-Westphalia. Owing to the lack of labour immigration before 1989, there are only very few Muslims in the former East Germany. Among the German districts with the highest share of Muslim migrants are Groß-Gerau (district) and Offenbach (district) according to migrants data from the census 2011. The majority of Muslims in Germany are Sunnis, at 75%. There are Shia Muslims (7%) and mostly from Iran.

From the mid-2000s to 2016 there has been a surge migrants to Germany from outside Europe. Of the 680,000 regular migrants, 270,000 were Muslim. Additionally, of the 1,210,000 asylum seekers mainly from the Syrian civil war, 900,000 were Muslim (around 74%). Of the asylum seekers, 580,000 applicants were approved and 320,000 were denied or expected to be denied. According to the Pew Research Center, similar patterns of Muslim migration to Germany should be expected in the future and the Muslim population share is expected to grow.

In 2020 the Deutsche Islamkonferenz, based on a study, estimated between 5.3 and 5.6 million Muslims lived in Germany.

When in June 2024 the results of the 2022 census were published by the Federal Statistical Office of Germany, it became evident, that the German government does not know how many Muslims live in Germany and where they are located. While the number and localisation of citizens attributed to major Christian denominations could be pulled from Resident registration, no such data were available on unrecognized religious communities. Furthermore questions about religious beliefs had been dropped from the 2022 census questionnaire.

== History ==
=== Early history ===
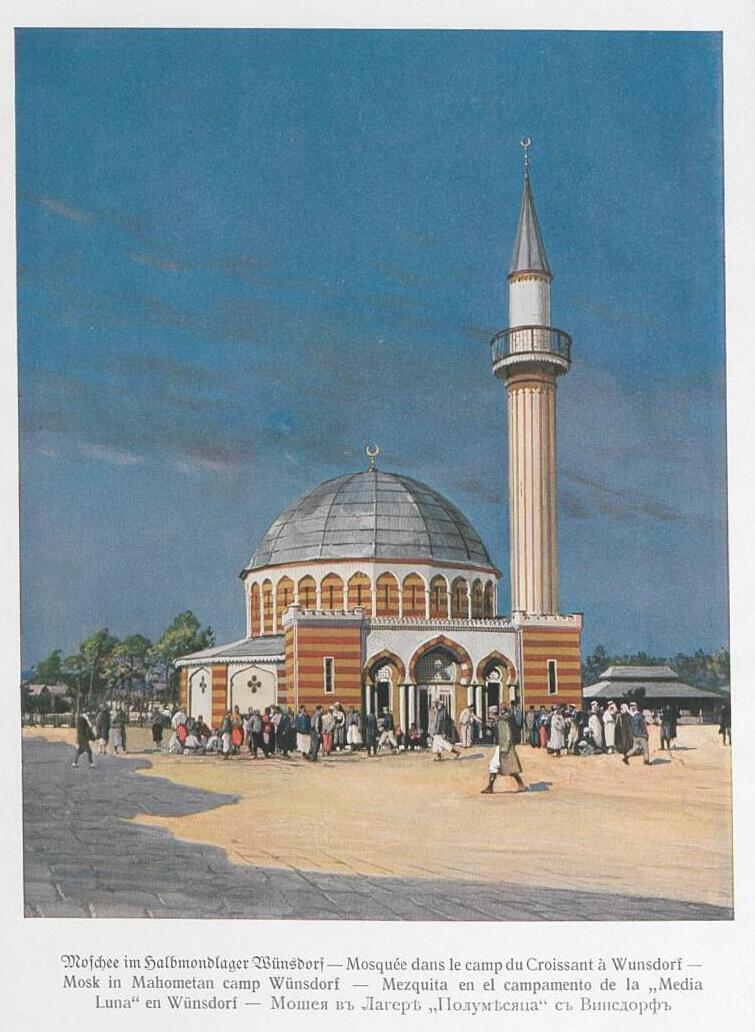
The Wünsdorf Mosque, at the Halbmondlager POW camp, was Germany's first mosque, built in 1915; it was demolished between 1925 and 1926.

Muslims first moved to Germany as part of the diplomatic, military and economic relations between Germany and the Ottoman Empire in the eighteenth century. Twenty Muslim soldiers served under Frederick William I of Prussia, at the beginning of the eighteenth century. In 1745, Frederick II of Prussia established a unit of Muslims in the Prussian army called the "Muslim Riders" and consisting mainly of Bosniaks, Albanians and Tatars. In 1760 a Bosnian Muslim corps was established with about 1,000 men. In 1798 a Muslim cemetery was established in Berlin. The cemetery, which moved in 1866, still exists today. A number of German philosophers expressed sympathy for Islam, including Johann Wolfgang von Goethe (who particularly admired the Sufi poetry of Hafez) and later Friedrich Nietzsche (in The Antichrist, he claimed that the Germanic spirit was closer to the Moors of Al-Andalus than that of Greece, Rome and Christianity).

The German Empire had over two million Muslim subjects, mostly Sunnis, in overseas colonies. The majority lived in German East Africa. Several Muslim revolts against German colonial rule occurred, including the Adamawa Campaign, Maji Maji Rebellion and Abushiri revolt.

=== 1920s to the 1940s ===
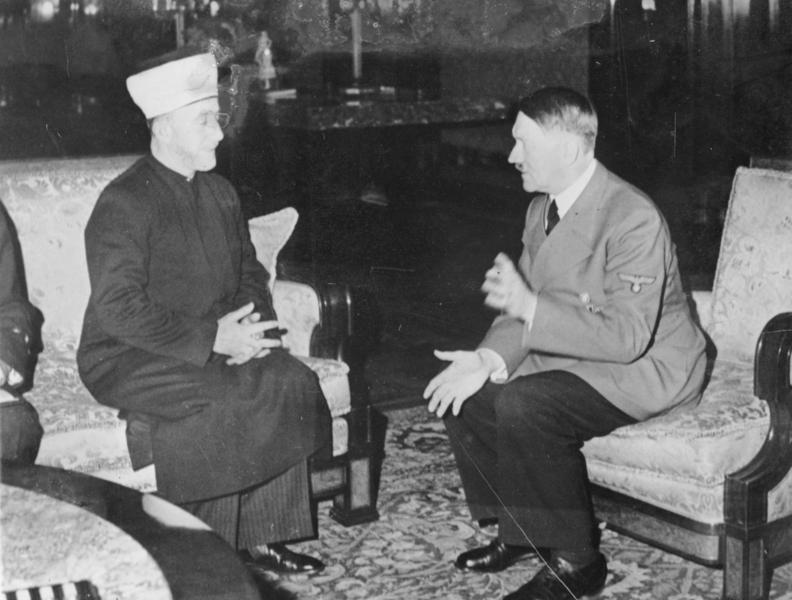
Haj Amin al-Husseini meeting with Adolf Hitler (28 November 1941)

The Islamic Institut Ma'ahad-ul-Islam was founded in 1927 and is now known under the name "Zentralinstitut Islam-Archiv-Deutschland" (Central Islamic Archive Institute) and is the oldest such institution in Germany. Shortly after its founding the Nazi Party came to power the archive was forced to suspend all further work, until after the war. During World War II Grand Mufti of Jerusalem Haj Amin al-Husseini for strategic reasons, recruited Muslims from occupied territories into several divisions of the Waffen SS (primarily the 13th Waffen Mountain Division of the SS Handschar (1st Croatian) and 21st Waffen Mountain Division of the SS Skanderbeg) and some other units.

In September 1943 Hitler specifically decreed that Muslim Germans could be members of the party as well as people of Christian denominations.

=== Post-war Germany ===
After the West German Government invited foreign workers ("Gastarbeiter") in 1961, the figure sharply rose to currently 4.3 million (most of them Turkish from the rural region of Anatolia in southeast Turkey). They are sometimes called a parallel society within ethnic Germans.

According to the German statistical office 9.1% of all newborns in Germany had Muslim parents in 2005.

In 2017, Muslims and Islamic institutions were targeted by attacks 950 times, where houses are painted with Nazi symbols, hijab-wearing women are harassed, threatening letters are sent and 33 people were injured. In nearly all cases, the perpetrators were right-wing extremists.

In May 2018 a court in Berlin upheld the right to the state's neutrality principle by barring a primary school teacher from wearing a headscarf during classes, where the court spokesman stated that children should be free of the influence that can be exerted by religious symbols.

According to a study in 2018 by Leipzig University, 56% of Germans sometimes thought the many Muslims made them feel like strangers in their own country, up from 43% in 2014. In 2018, 44% thought immigration by Muslims should be banned, up from 37% in 2014.

In December 2018, the government of Germany strengthened the control of Saudi, Kuwaiti and Qatari funding for radical mosque congregations. The measure was recommended by an anti-terrorist agency in Berlin (German: Terrorismus-Abwehrzentrum) which since 2015 had started to monitor Salafist proselytizing funding in the wake of the European migrant crisis to prevent refugees from becoming radicalized. Henceforth, Gulf authorities are required to report payments and funding to the German Federal Foreign Office (German: Auswärtiges Amt).

Between 2010 and 2016, the number of Muslims living in Germany increased from 3.3 million (4.1% of the population) to nearly 5 million (6.1%). The most important factor in the growth of Germany's Muslim population is immigration.

In December 2018, there were no official statistics on how much funding mosques in Germany received from abroad.

In July 2020, federal state Baden-Württemberg banned face-covering veils for school pupils as an extension of the ban which was already in force for staff.

== Denominations ==
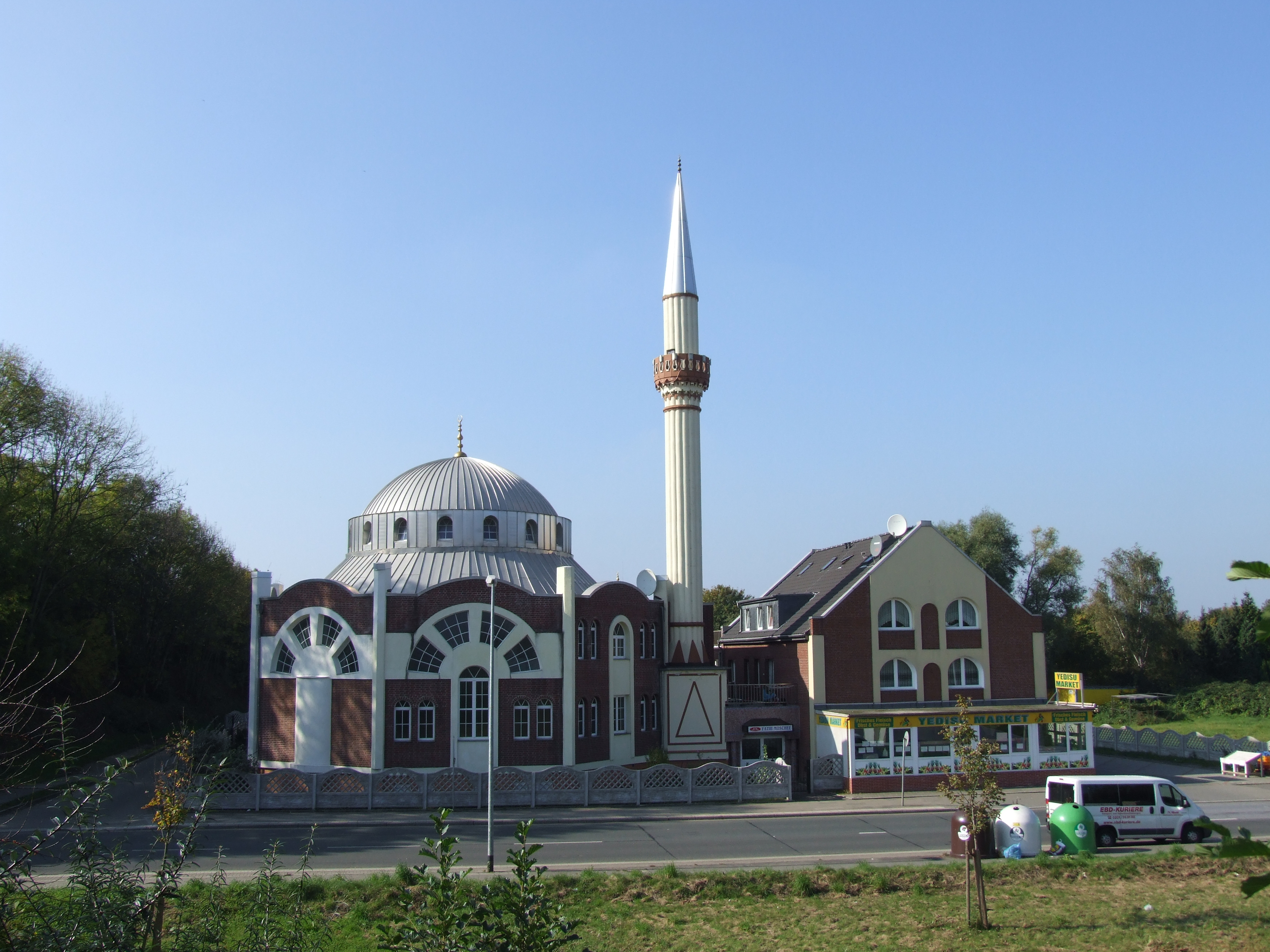
A mosque in Essen

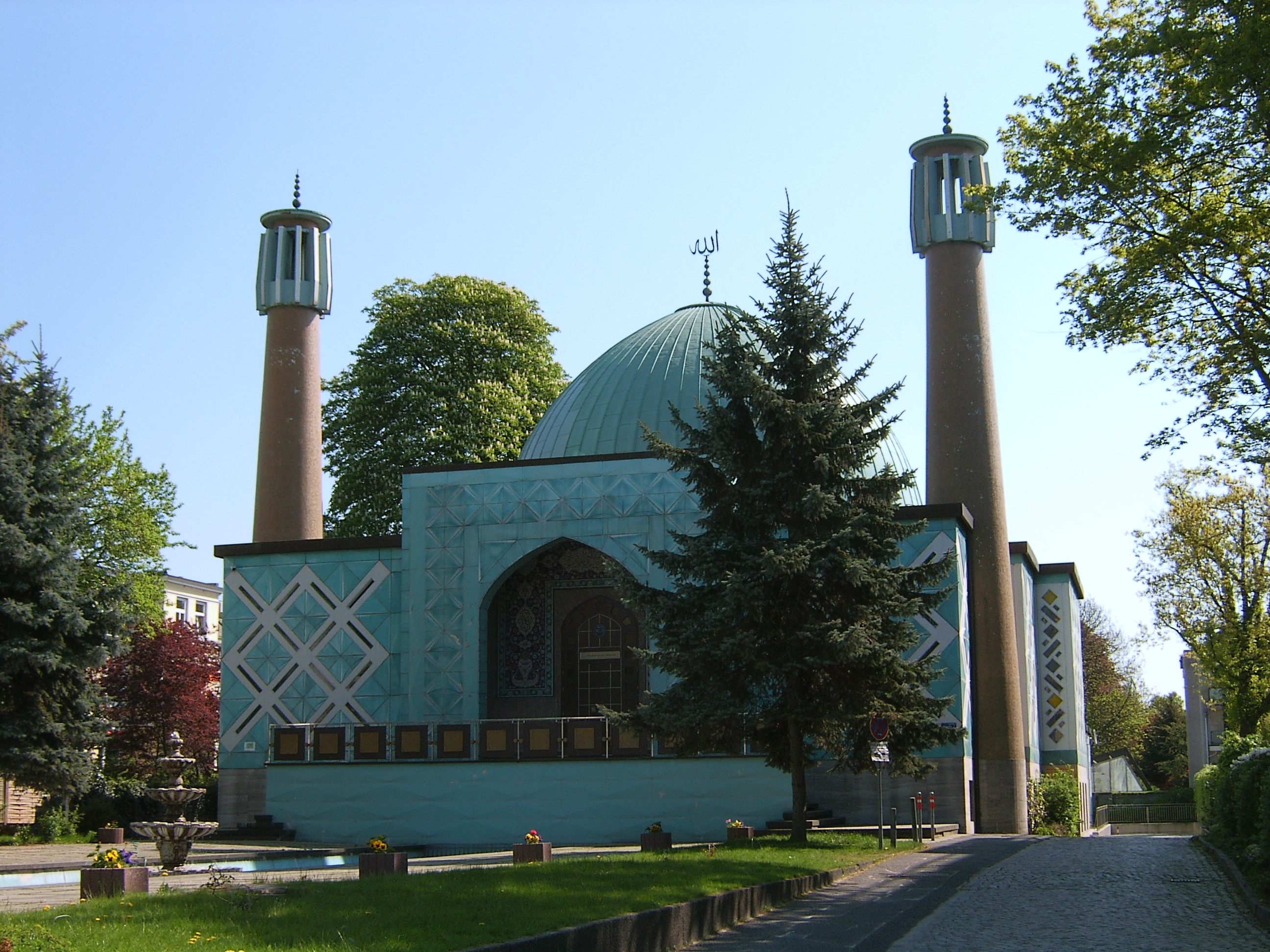
Islamic Centre Hamburg of Shia Islam proscribed since july 2024

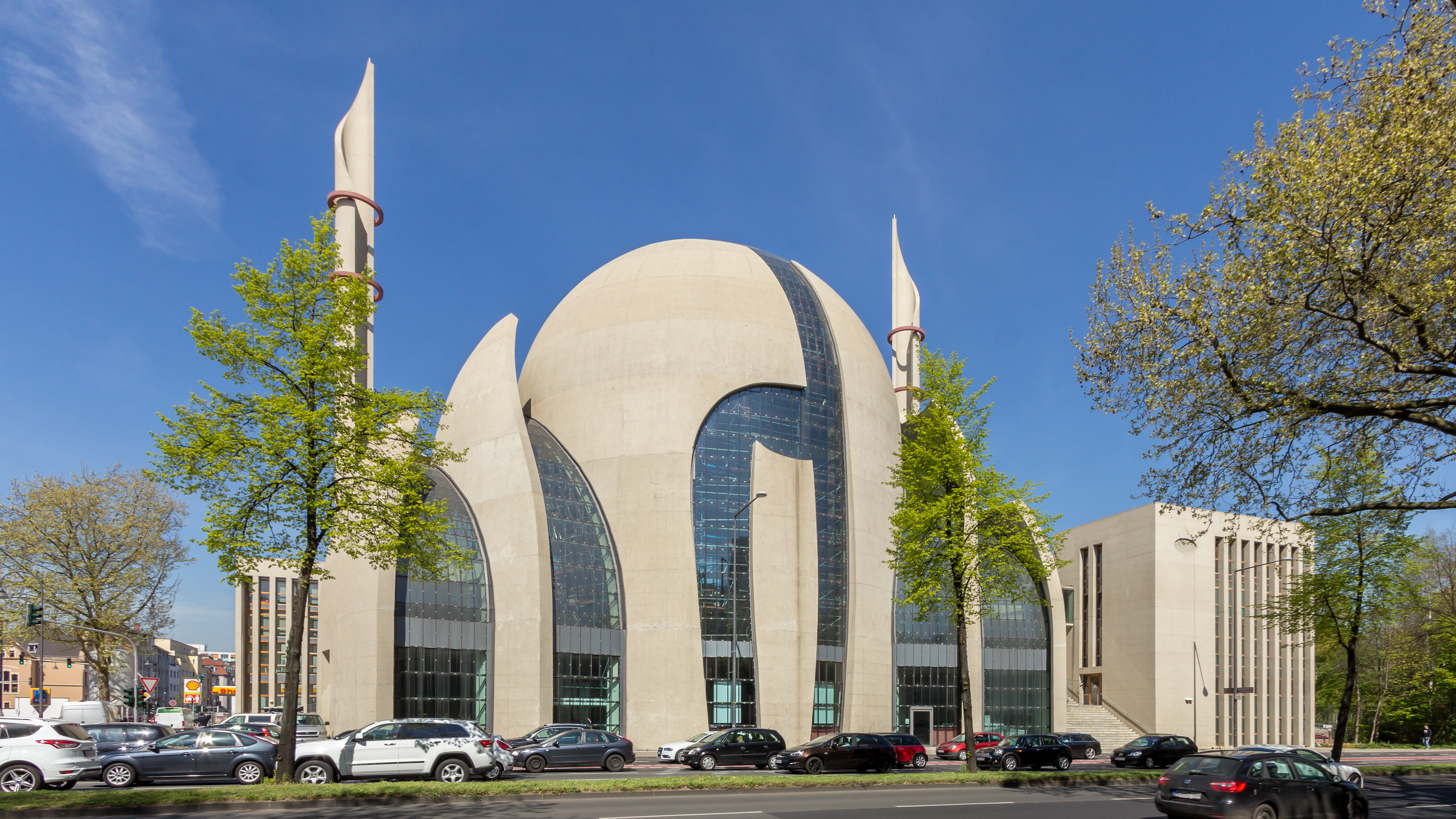
Cologne Central Mosque

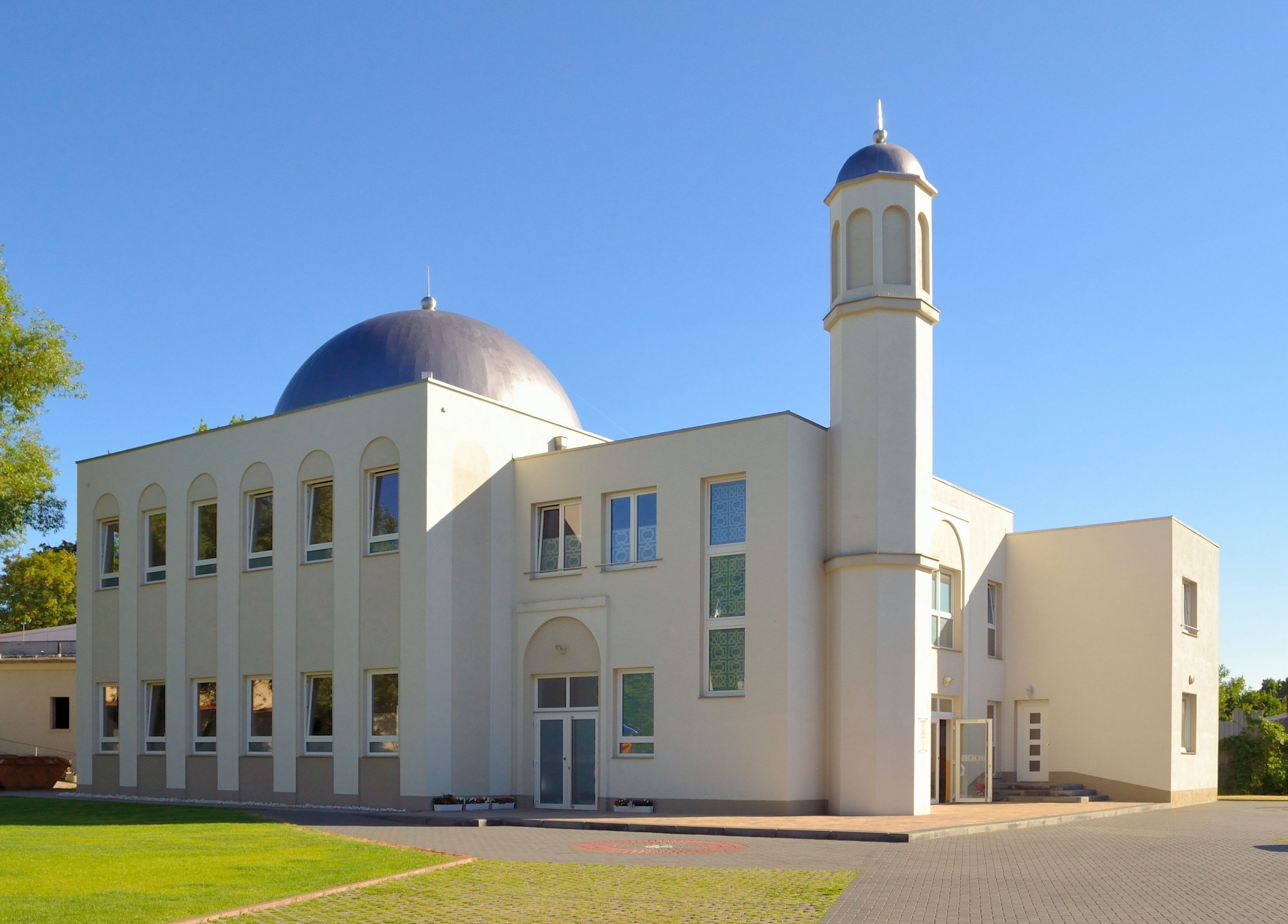
Khadija Mosque in Berlin of the Ahmadiyya Muslim Community

Muslims in Germany belong to several different branches of Islam (approximate data):

- Sunnis 4,125,000- 75% of Muslim population in 2020 compared to 2,640,000 in 2017
- Alevis 440,000 to 500,000 in 2020 compared to 500,000 in 2017
- Twelvers Shi'as 220,000 to 270,000 in 2020 compared to 2017 225,500
- Alawites 70,000 in 2020, stable vs 2017
- Ahmadiyya 40,000 to 50,000 in 2020 compared to 35,000-45,000 in 2017
- Salafis 10,300
- Sufis 10,000
- Ismailis 1,900
- Zaydis 800
- Ibadis 270

== Islamic organisations ==
Only a minority of the Muslims residing in Germany are members of religious associations.

=== Sunni ===
- Diyanet İşleri Türk İslam Birliği (DİTİB): German branch of the Turkish Presidency for Religious Affairs, Cologne. As of 2016, the Turkish government funds and provides staff for 900 of Germany's roughly 3000 mosques run by DİTİB.
- Islamische Gemeinschaft Milli Görüş: close to the Islamist Saadet Partisi in Turkey, Kerpen near Cologne
- Islamische Gemeinschaft Jamaat un-Nur (de): German branch of the Risale-i Nur Society (Said Nursi)
- Islamische Gemeinschaft in Deutschland organization of Arab Muslims close to the Muslim Brotherhood, Frankfurt

In addition there are numerous local associations without affiliation to any of these organisations. Two organisations have been banned in 2002 because their programme was judged as contrary to the constitution: The "Hizb ut-Tahrir" and the so-called "Caliphate State" founded by Cemalettin Kaplan and later led by his son Metin Kaplan.

=== Shia ===
- Islamische Gemeinschaft der schiitischen Gemeinden Deutschlands (IGS): Head organization that unite all Shiite mosques and associations in Germany, with being the Islamic Centre Hamburg the most important Shia mosque in Germany.
- Al-Mustafa Institut Berlin: A branch of the Al-Mustafa International University in Qum, Iran to Islamic theology to students in Germany and Europe.

=== Ahmadiyya ===
- Ahmadiyya Muslim Jamaat Deutschland K.d.ö.R.: German branch of the worldwide Ahmadiyya Community. There is no ethnicity or race associated with this community although most of the members of the community residing in Germany are of Pakistani origin. The Ahmadiyya Community was established in Germany in 1923 in Berlin and is one of the largest in Europe. Communities exist in Baden-Württemberg, Lower Saxony, North Rhine-Westphalia, Hesse and Bremen.
- Lahore Ahmadiyya Movement: German branch of the worldwide Lahore Ahmadiyya Movement.

=== Liberal Islam ===
- Ibn Ruschd-Goethe mosque in Berlin was founded by Seyran Ateş. The liberal mosque has been condemned by the Turkish religious authority and the Egyptian Fatwa Council at the Al-Azhar University.
- Ibn Rushd Prize for Freedom of Thought

=== Wahhabism ===
- King Fahd Academy, sponsored by Saudi Arabia. The school was closed at the end of the 2016/2017 school year, after long-running criticism that it was attracting Islamists to Germany.
- According to the FFGI at Goethe University Frankfurt, wahhabist ideology is spread in Germany as in other European country mostly by an array of informal, personal and organisational networks, where organisations closely associated with the government of Saudi Arabia such as the Muslim World League (WML) and the World Association of Muslim Youth are actively participating.

=== Others ===
- Verband der islamischen Kulturzentren: German branch of the conservative Süleymancı sect in Turkey, Cologne
- Verband der Islamischen Gemeinden der Bosniaken: Bosnian Muslims, Kamp-Lintfort near Duisburg
- Zentralinstitut Islam-Archiv-Deutschland e.V. : Documentary of Islamic Foundation-writings since 1739. The Islamic Institute was founded in 1942 (Sooner called Ma'ahad-ul-Islam Institut).

=== Umbrella organisations ===
Furthermore, there are the following umbrella organisations:

- Central Council of Muslims in Germany (Zentralrat der Muslime in Deutschland)
- Islamic Council in Germany (Islamrat in Deutschland)

=== Education ===
- The A-Nur-Kita preschool was closed in February 2019 due to its parent organisation, the mosque association Arab Nil Rhein in Mainz propagated material from the Muslim Brotherhood and salafist ideology. Therefore, the parent association was incompatible with the constitution of Germany. This was the first time authorities closed any preschool in Rhineland-Palatinate (German: Rheinland-Pfalz). A-Nur-Kita was the first and only Muslim preschool in Rhineland-Palatinate.

=== Mosques ===
There are now 18 official mosques in the country that have been established as mosques since time immemorial. Muslim places of worship (such as mosques and other places of worship) are estimated at between 1,000 and 1,200. Most of these mosques are temporarily built and are mostly located in rented places, factories or warehouses. According to the archives of the Central Institute of Islam, the most important mosques in Germany are located in cities such as Hamburg, Berlin, Mannheim, Marl, Dortmund, Cologne, Frankfurt, Wesling, Bonn, Zingen, Fortsheim, as well as mosques. The cities of Aachen and Munich are important mosques in Germany. These mosques are far from the city center and are often located in industrial areas.

In 2010, the German Ministry of Education and Research established Islamic Theological Studies as an academic discipline at public universities in order to train teachers for Islamic religious education and Muslim theologians. Since then, Islamic theological departments have been established at several universities, conducting research and teaching on Islam from a theological perspective.

== Controversies ==
=== Islamophobia ===
Islamophobia in Germany refers to the set of discourses, behaviors and structures which express feelings of anxiety, fear, hostility and rejection towards Islam and/or Muslims in Germany. Islamophobia can manifest itself through discrimination in the workforce, negative coverage in the media, and violence against Muslims. Crimes against mosques in Germany decreased by 16% in 2025 compared to 2024, despite Islamic terrorist threats being the most prevalent in Germany.

At the Alternative for Germany party congress held on 30 April to 1 May 2016, AfD adopted a policy platform based upon opposition to Islam, calling for the ban of Islamic symbols including burqas, minarets, and adhan (call to prayer), using the slogan "Islam is not a part of Germany".

==== Islamophobia in the education system ====
One issue concerns the wearing of the head-scarf by teachers in schools and universities. The right to practice one's religion, stated by the teachers in question, contradicts in the view of many the neutral stance of the state towards religion. As of 2006, many of the German federal states have introduced legislation banning head-scarves for teachers. However, such a ban in North-Rhine Westphalia was declared as unconstitutional in 2015 by the Federal Constitutional Court.

In most German federal states, except Bremen, Berlin, and Brandenburg, religious education is offered as an elective subject in state schools. There are discussions about introducing Islamic religious education alongside existing Catholic, Protestant, and, in some schools, Jewish education. Trials for Islamic religious education are underway in several states, and it is already a regular class in Hessen, Lower Saxony, and North Rhine-Westphalia. However, cooperation with Islamic organizations is challenging since no single organization represents the entire Muslim community. The discussion of religious (Islamic) education in German schools started in the 1970s, and also symmetrically with issues of Qur'anic classes as well as its deterrent effects on the integration of Turkish students into the country.

The construction of mosques is occasionally subjected to Islamophobic reactions in the neighborhoods. For example, in 2007 an attempt by Muslims to build a large mosque in Cologne sparked a controversy.

In recent years, Mosques in Germany have been receiving larger quantities of hate mail as well as threats.

=== Islamic fundamentalism and Salafism ===
According to a 2007 Federal Ministry of the Interior report, almost half of all young Muslims in Germany express fundamentalist views. Approximately 12% of Muslims in Germany support moral-religious criticism of certain Western societal values, along with a range of views on punishments, including corporal punishment and, in some cases, the Capital punishment.

A 2012 poll found that 72% of Turks in Germany see Islam as the only true religion, while 46% expressed a preference for a growing Muslim population in the future. A survey of Bielefeld University revealed that only 19% of Germans believe Islam is compatible with their culture.

In September 2014, the "Shariah Police" incident occurred. Hardline Salafist Muslims patrolled the streets of Wuppertal, a city in the west of Germany, to "influence and recruit young people", according to local police. Dressed in bright orange reflective vests with "Shariah Police" printed on the back, the male patrollers loitered around discotheques and gambling houses, telling passers-by to refrain from gambling and alcohol. Wuppertal's police pressed charges.

A 2013 study by the Social Science Research Center Berlin found that two-thirds of Muslims prioritize religious rules over national laws, nearly 60% reject homosexual friends, 45% distrust Jews, and many believe the West aims to destroy Islam. For comparison, among Christians, 9% are openly anti-Semitic, 13% reject homosexual friends, and 23% think Muslims aim to destroy Western culture. Additionally, 25% of Turks in Germany consider atheists inferior.

Salafism, a part of Sunni branch of Islam, according to German authorities, Salafism is incompatible with the principles codified in the Constitution of Germany. According to the German security service, the Salafist movement has grown from 3,800 members in 2011 to 10,300 in September 2017. Security chief Hans-Georg Maaßen noted that the movement lacks a single leader, requiring many individuals to be monitored. In 2016, the interior ministry of North Rhine-Westphalia reported that the number of mosques with a Salafist influence had risen from 30 to 55, which indicated both an actual increase and improved reporting. In February 2017, German authorities banned the Berliner Fussilet-Moscheeverein, which Anis Amri, the 2016 Berlin truck attack, reportedly visited. In March 2017, the Deutschsprachige Islamkreis Hildesheim was also banned for planning to join ISIS in Syria. The Federal Agency for Civic Education noted that these bans illustrate how Salafist mosques can be involved in planning terrorism.

In 2016, the German security service estimated that around 24,000 Muslims were involved in Islamist movements, with 10,000 linked to the Salafist scene. That same year, 90 mosques were monitored by the Federal Office for the Protection of the Constitution for promoting Islamist ideologies. Between 2017 and April 2018, 80 Islamist extremists without German citizenship were deported. By March 2018, 760 Islamists in Germany were classified as dangerous by police, with more than half residing in the country, including 153 in prison.

In July 2010, Germany banned the Internationale Humanitäre Hilfsorganisation e.V. (IHH Germany), accusing it of using donations to fund Hamas, which is considered by Germany to be a terrorist organization. German Interior Minister Thomas de Maiziere stated that donations to IHH, presented as humanitarian aid, actually supported Hamas. Authorities believed IHH collected funds and sent $8.3 million to Hamas-linked organizations.

On 27 April 2024, more than 1,000 Islamists protested in Hamburg for a caliphate and Sharia law in Germany.

=== Antisemitism ===
A 2012 poll indicated that 18% of Turks in Germany viewed Jews as inferior. A 2017 Bielefeld University study reported that antisemitic harassment and assaults in Germany were perpetrated equally by individuals from the extreme right and left, with a significant portion also committed by Muslims. According to the Federal Office for the Protection of the Constitution, the majority of Islamist organizations in Germany cultivate antisemitic propaganda and distribute it in various ways. However, according to German police statistics, more than 90 percent of antisemitic incidents along with Islamophobic ones are perpetrated by individuals associated with the far right. However, government officials and Jewish community leaders have questioned this figure, arguing that attacks with unknown perpetrators are automatically categorized as "far‑right".

== Religiosity of young Muslims ==
Studies show that while not all Muslims are religious, Muslim youths are markedly more religious than non-Muslim youths. A study comparing Turkish Muslim youths living in Germany and German youth found that the former were more likely to attend religious services regularly (35% versus 14%).

41% of young Turkish Muslim boys and 52% of the girls said they prayed "sometimes or regularly"; 64% of boys and 74% of girls said they wanted to teach their children religion.

== Notable German Muslims ==
=== Categories ===
- List of Turkish Germans
- List of German people of Kurdish descent
- List of German people of Moroccan descent
- List of German people of Lebanese descent
- List of German people of Iranian descent
- List of German people of Palestinian descent

=== Others ===
- Vaneeza Ahmad, Pakistani-German model
- Laith Al-Deen, German singer
- Mehmed Ali Pasha, German-born Ottoman soldier
- Nadiem Amiri, German professional footballer
- Azet, German rapper
- Kristiane Backer, German television presenter, television journalist and author
- Danny Blum, German Soccer player
- Bushido, German rapper
- Denis Cuspert, German militant Islamist and former rapper
- Mahmoud Dahoud, football player
- Ibrahim El-Zayat, European Muslim activist in Germany and has been a functionary in many important Islamic organizations in Germany, Europe, and Saudi Arabia
- Cemile Giousouf, German politician, member of the German parliament Bundestag
- Fritz Grobba, German diplomat during the interwar period and World War II
- Karim Guédé, football player
- Kollegah, German rapper
- Murad Wilfried Hofmann, prominent German diplomat and author
- Hadayatullah Hübsch, German writer and journalist
- Lamya Kaddor, German writer and known for introducing Islamic education in German in public schools in Germany
- Jawed Karim, German-American Internet entrepreneur
- Elsa Kazi, German writer of one-act plays, short stories, novels and history; poet
- Hasnain Kazim, author and journalist, correspondent of the German news magazine Der Spiegel and Spiegel Online
- Rani Khedira, football player
- Sami Khedira, German Soccer player
- Sead Kolašinac, Bosnian professional footballer
- Mojib Latif, professor, meteorologist and oceanographer
- Johann von Leers, member of the Waffen SS in Nazi Germany, where he was also a professor known for his anti-Jewish polemics
- Jamal Malik, professor of Islamic Studies and chair of Religious Studies, University of Erfurt, Germany
- Shkodran Mustafi, German professional footballer
- Nash, German rapper
- Adam Neuser, popular pastor and theologian
- Morsal Obeidi, murder victim, of Afghan origin
- Nura Habib Omer, German rapper
- Susanne Osthoff, German archaeologist
- Leroy Sané, German football player
- Annemarie Schimmel
- Adel Tawil, German singer
- Bassam Tibi, political scientist and Professor of International Relations
- Pierre Vogel (born 1978), also known as Abu Hamza (Arabic: أبو حمزة), German Salafi Islamist preacher and former professional boxer
- Linda Wenzel, German schoolgirl who went missing in 2016 after converting to Islam and joining Islamic State of Iraq and the Levant

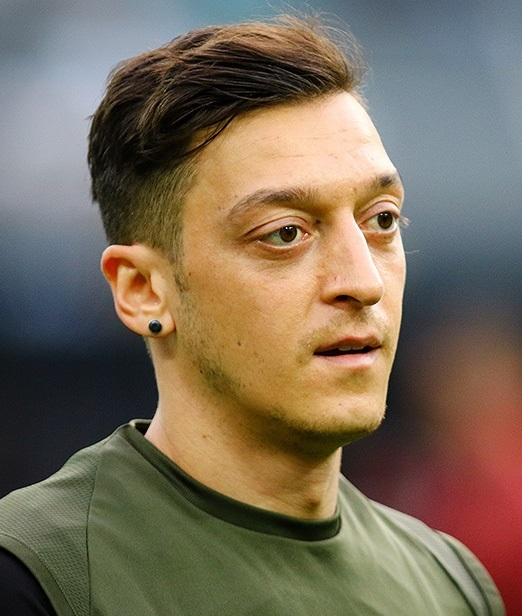
Mesut Özil

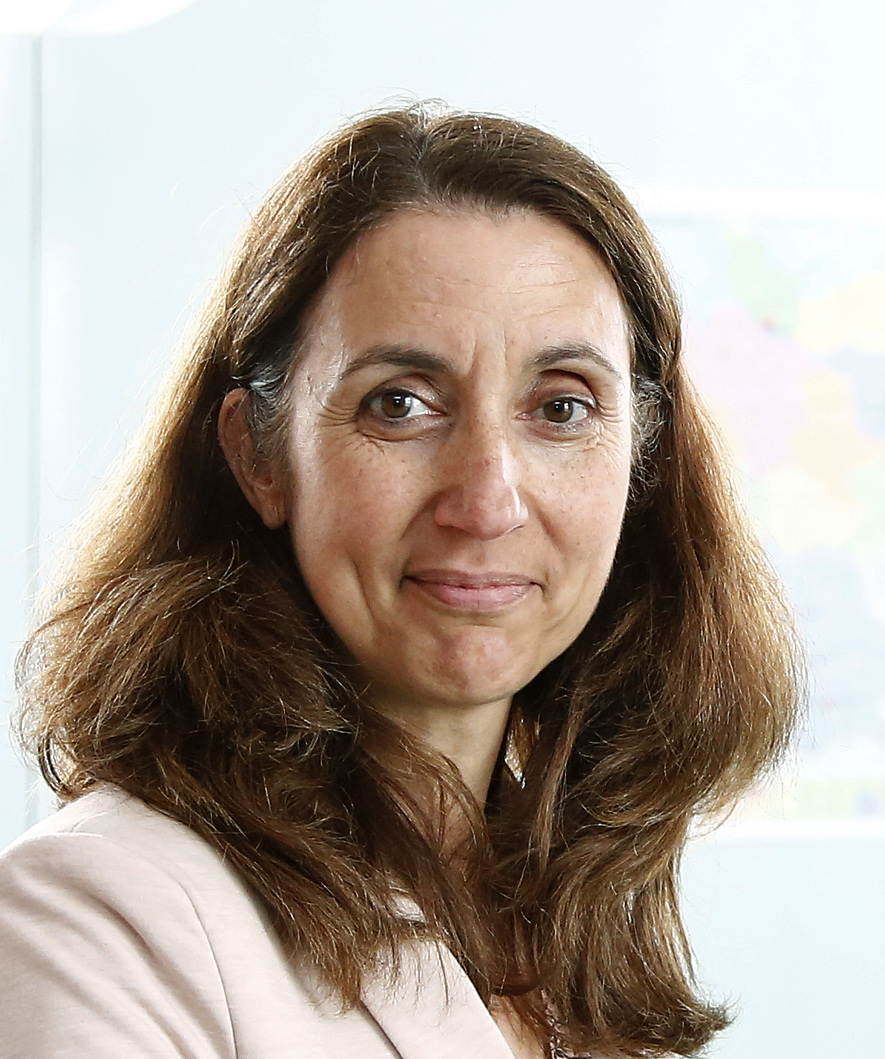
Aydan Özoğuz

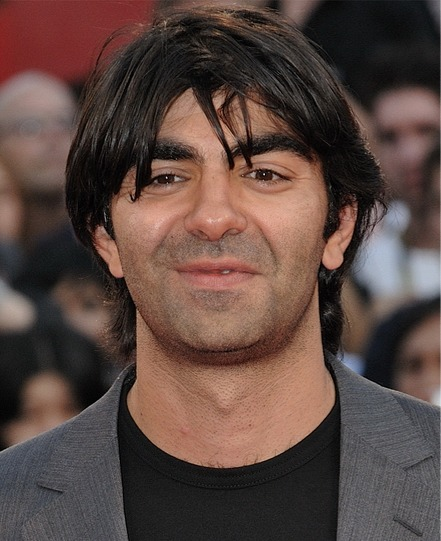
Fatih Akin

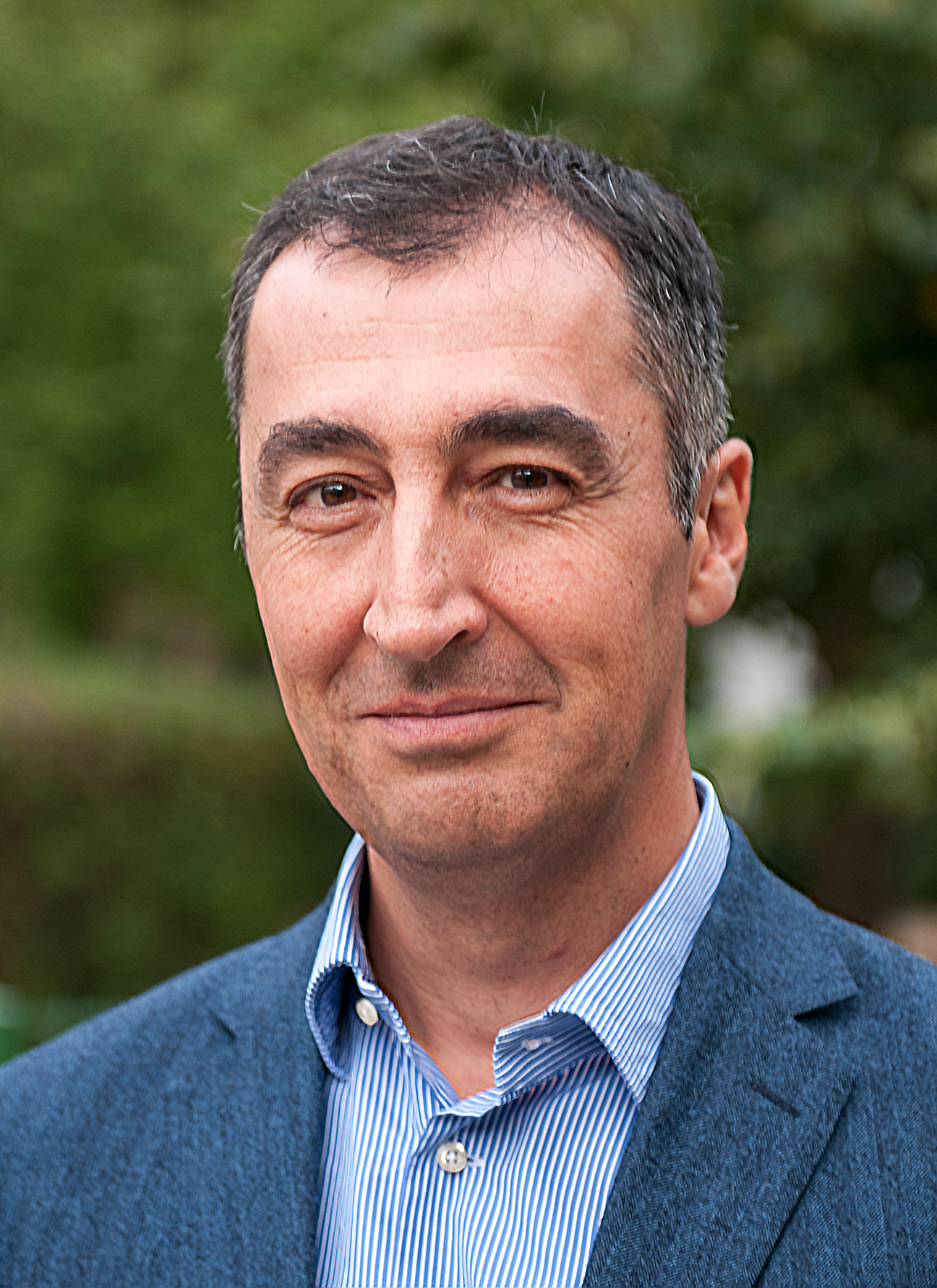
Cem Özdemir

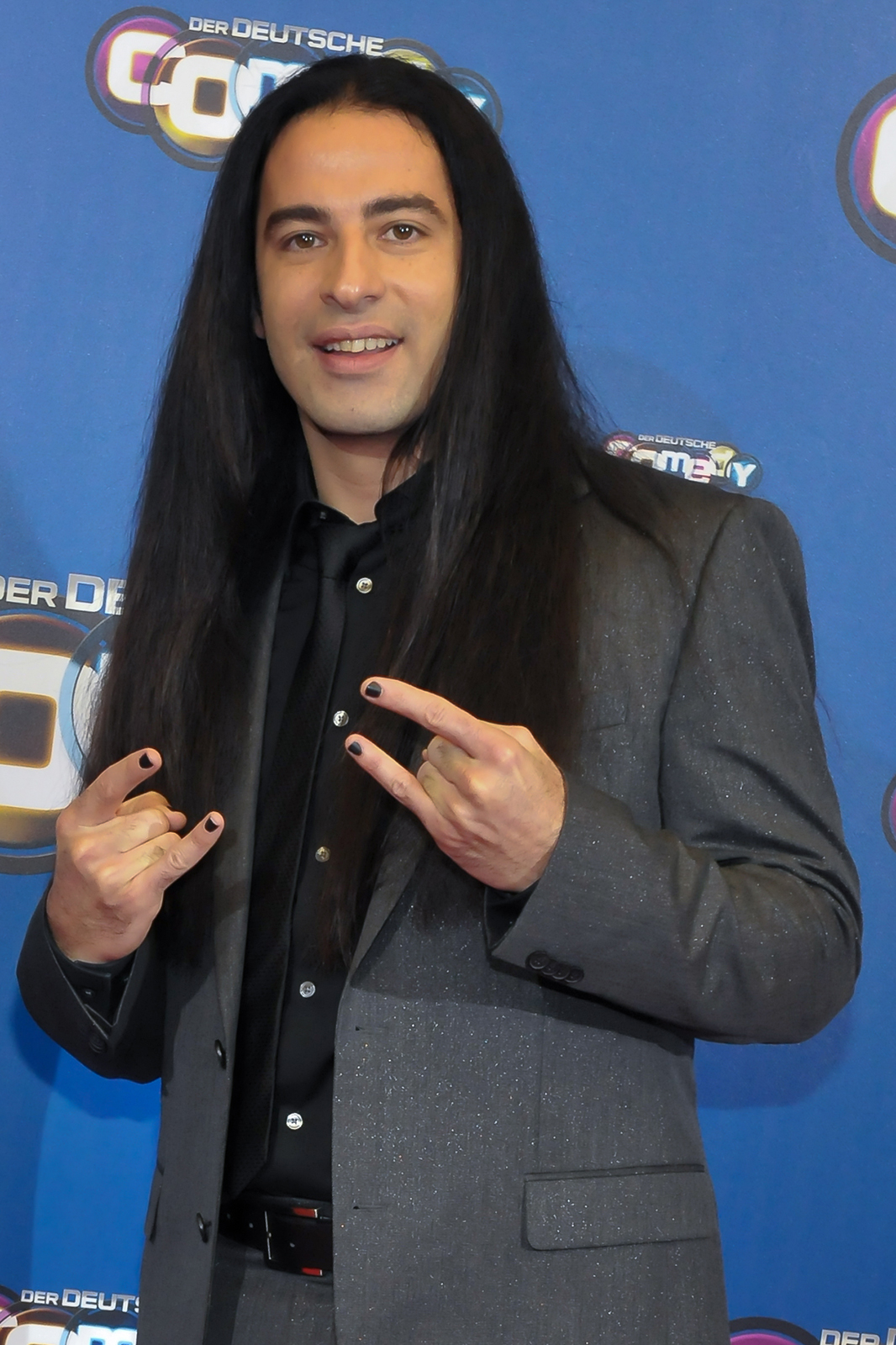
Bülent Ceylan

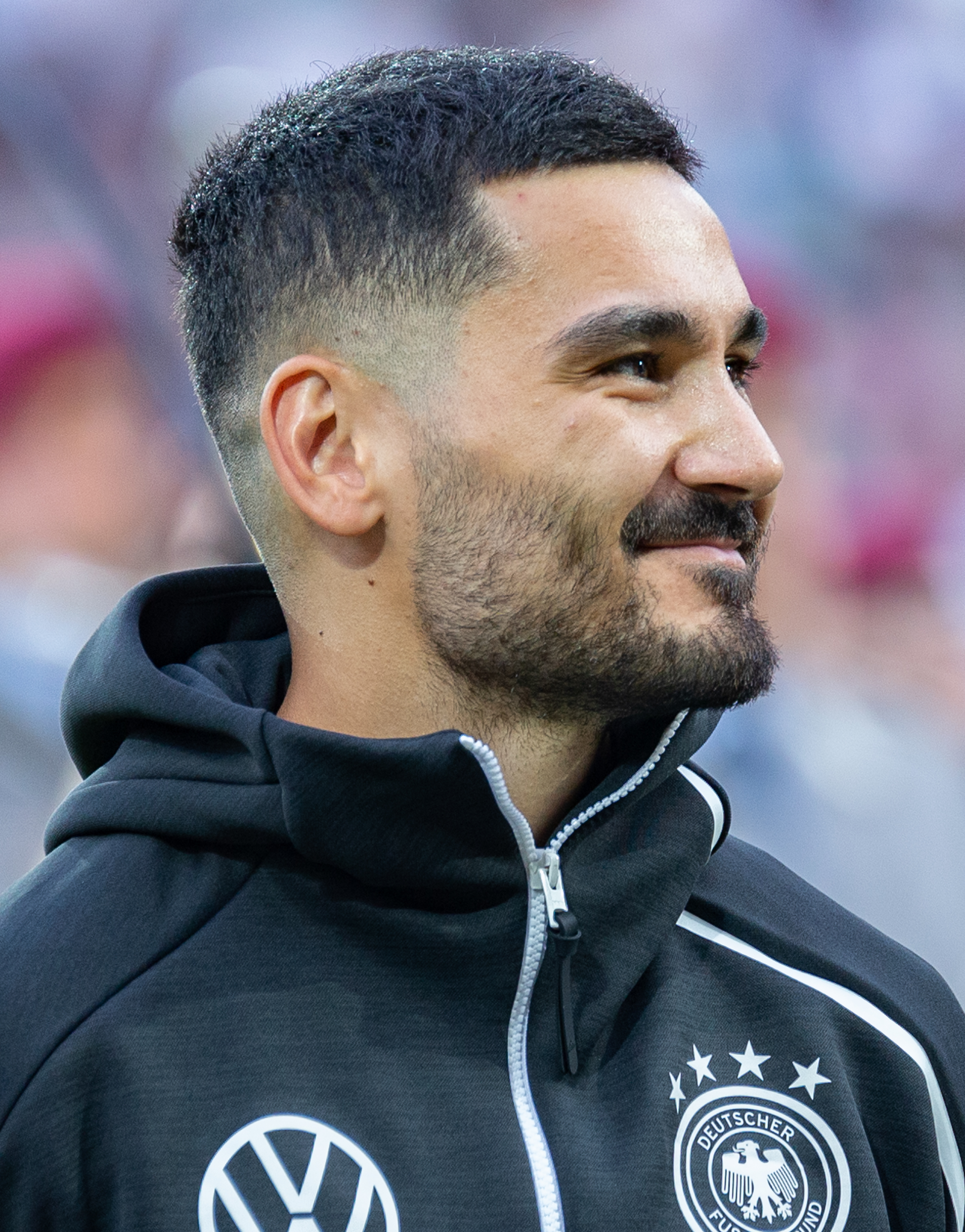
İlkay Gündoğan

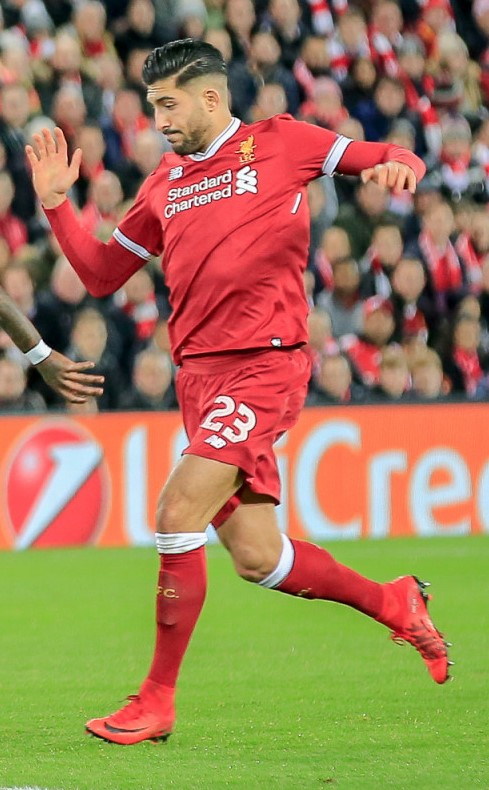
Emre Can

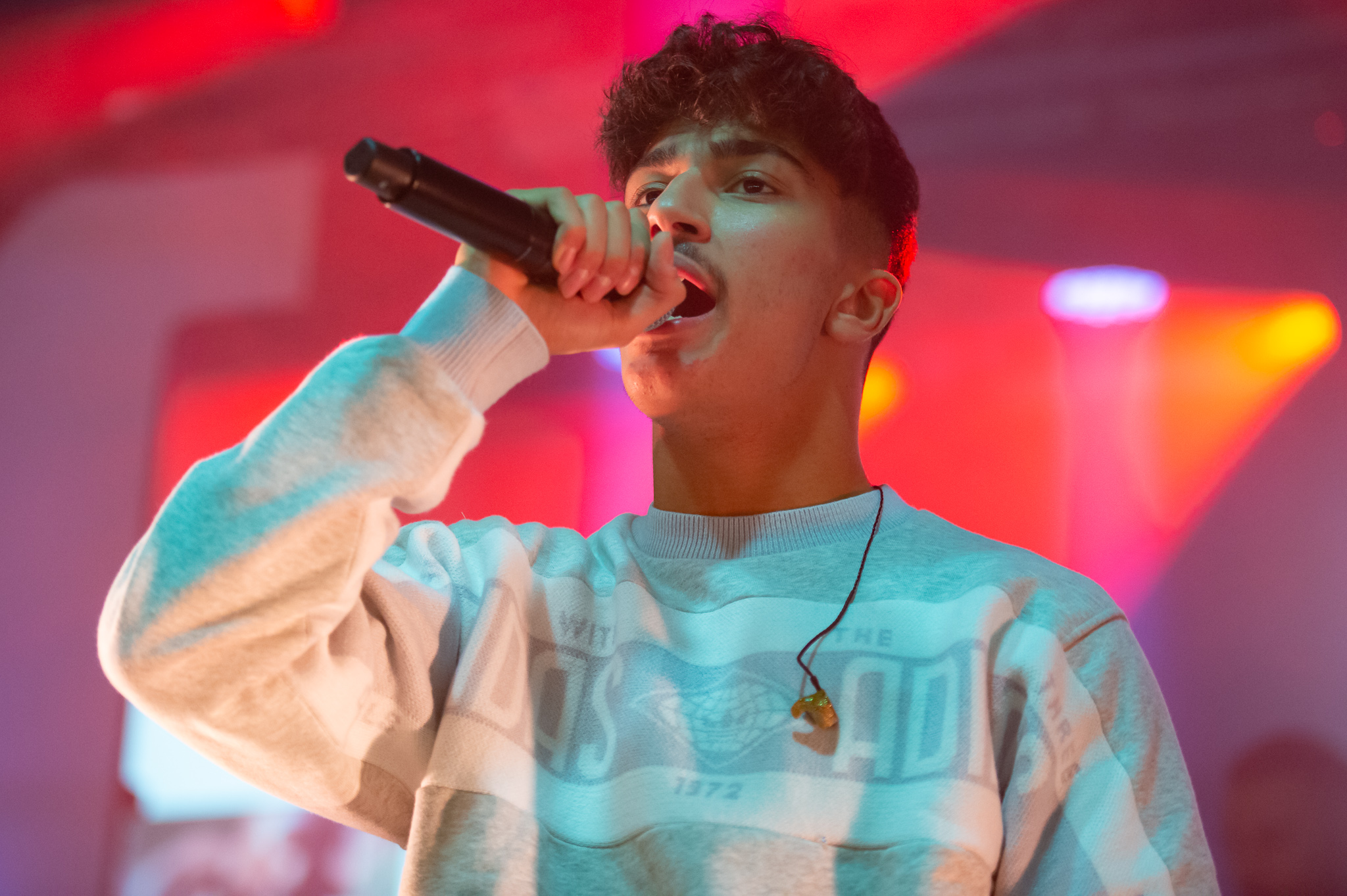
Mero

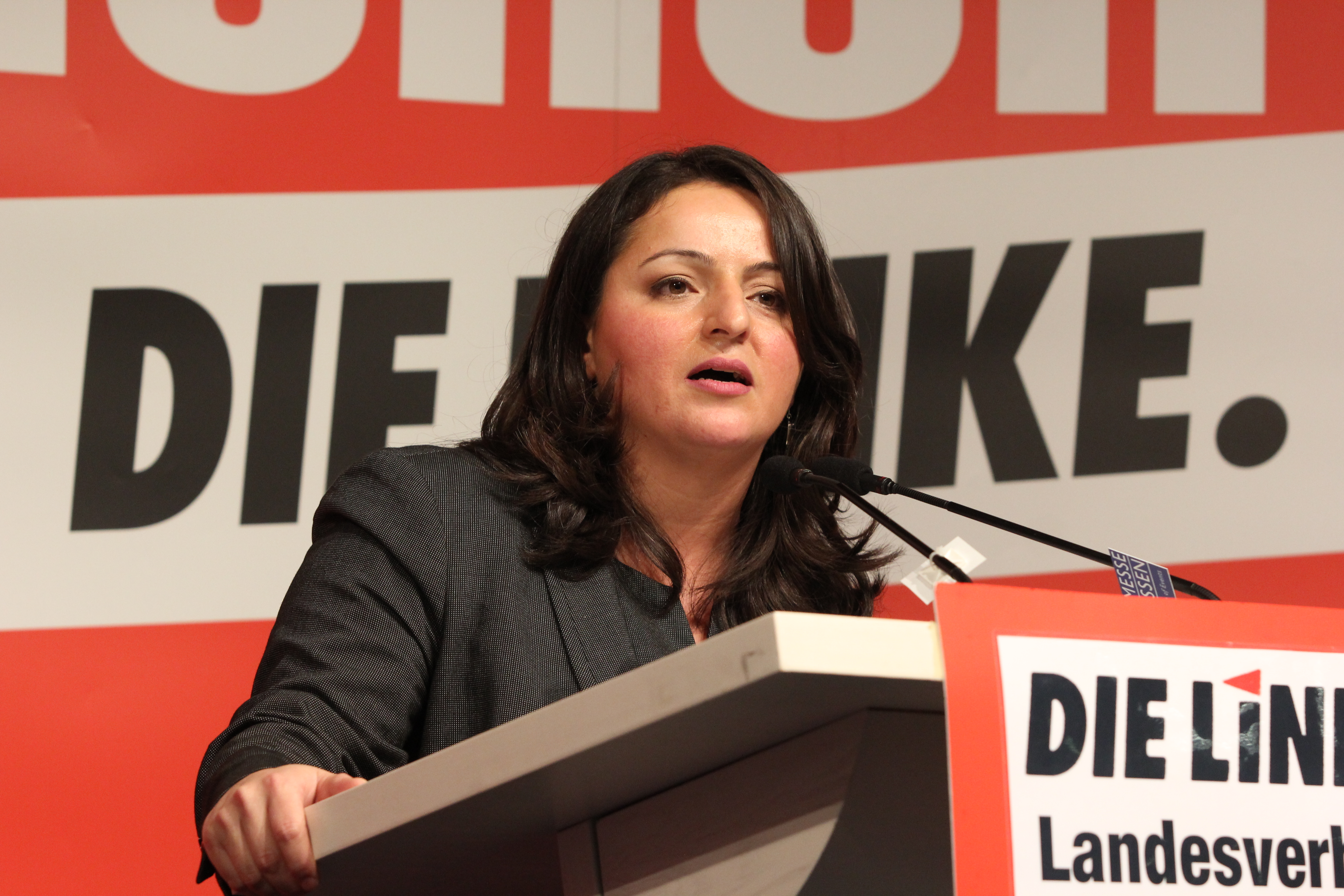
Sevim Dağdelen

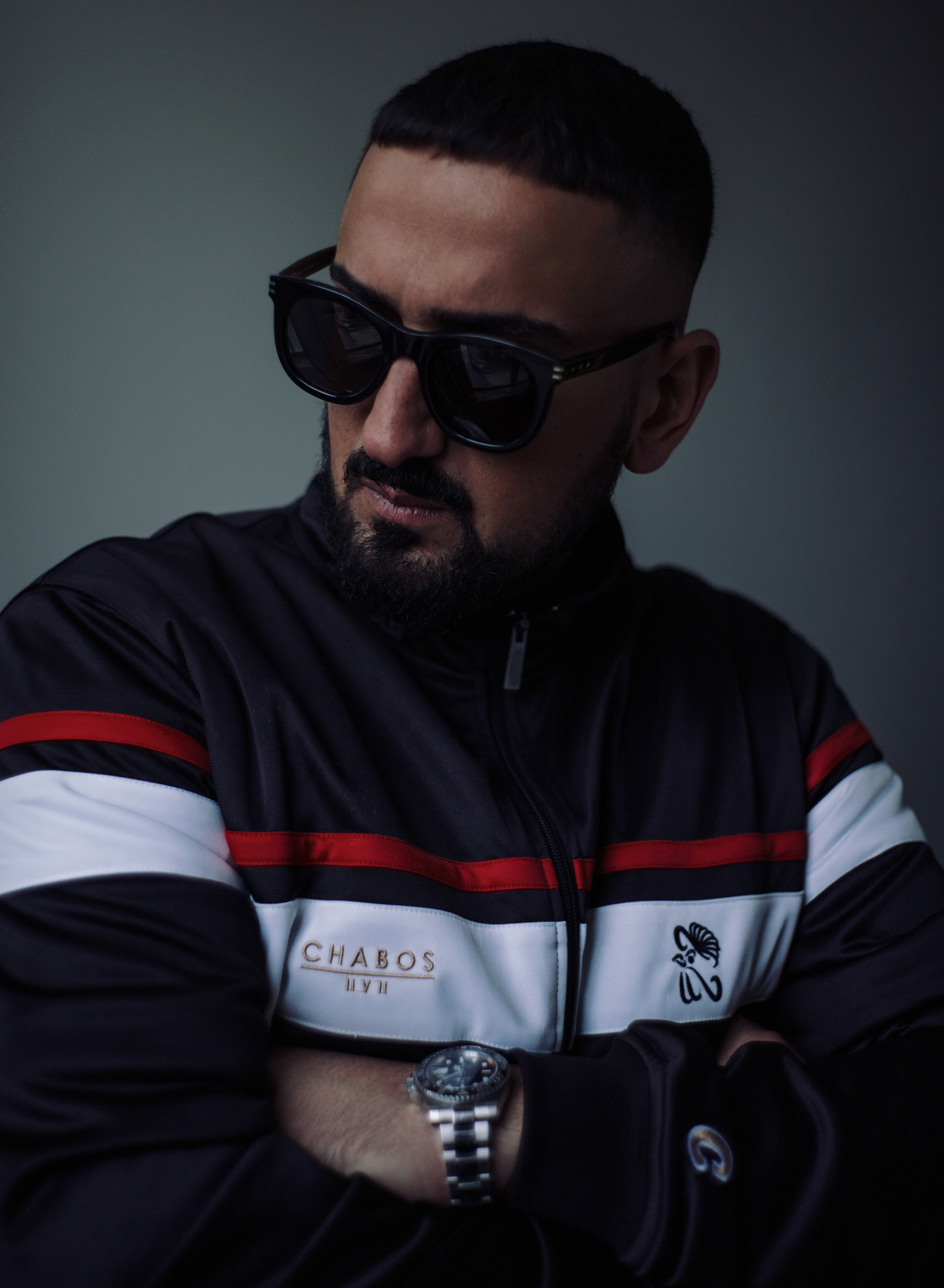
Haftbefehl

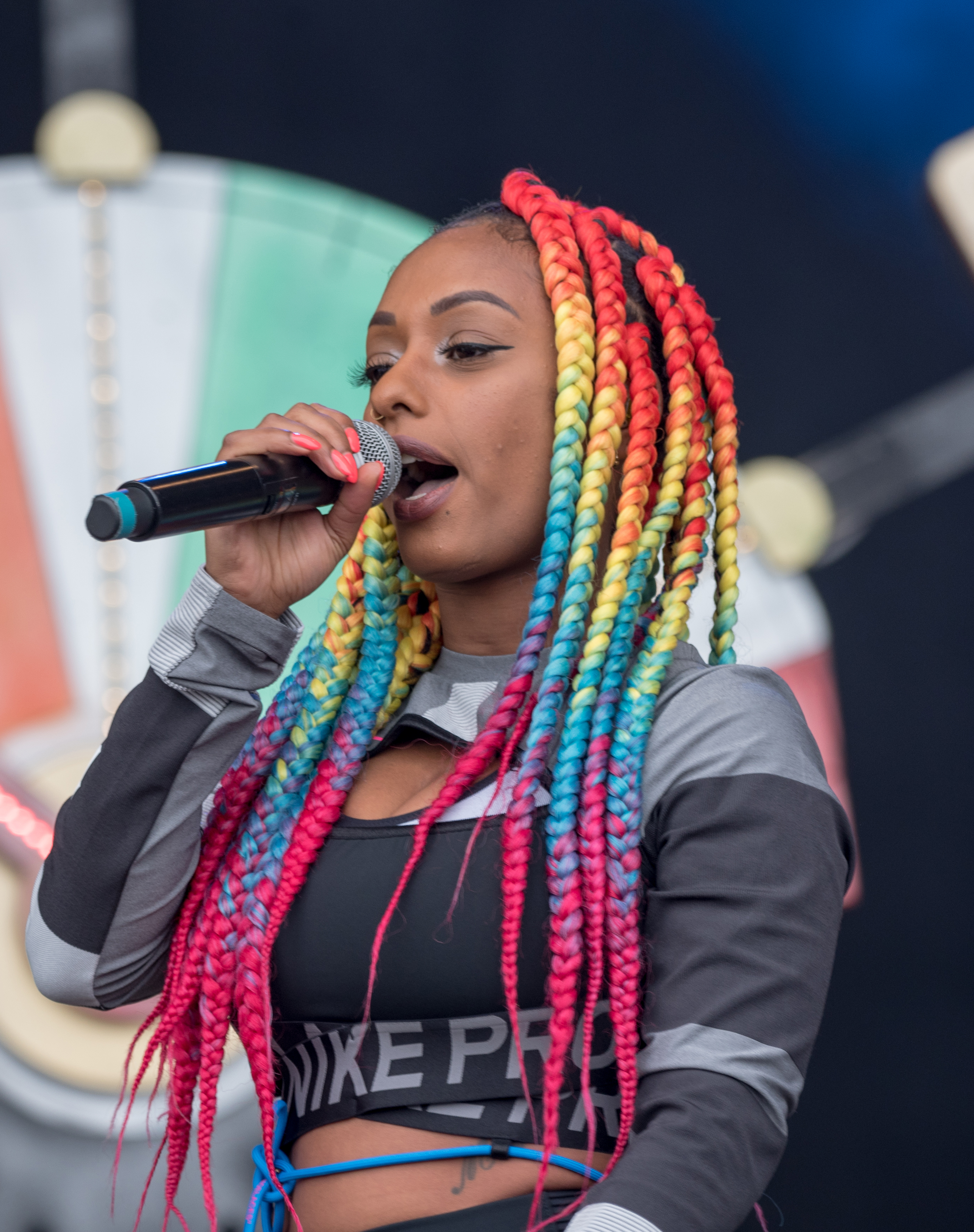
Nura

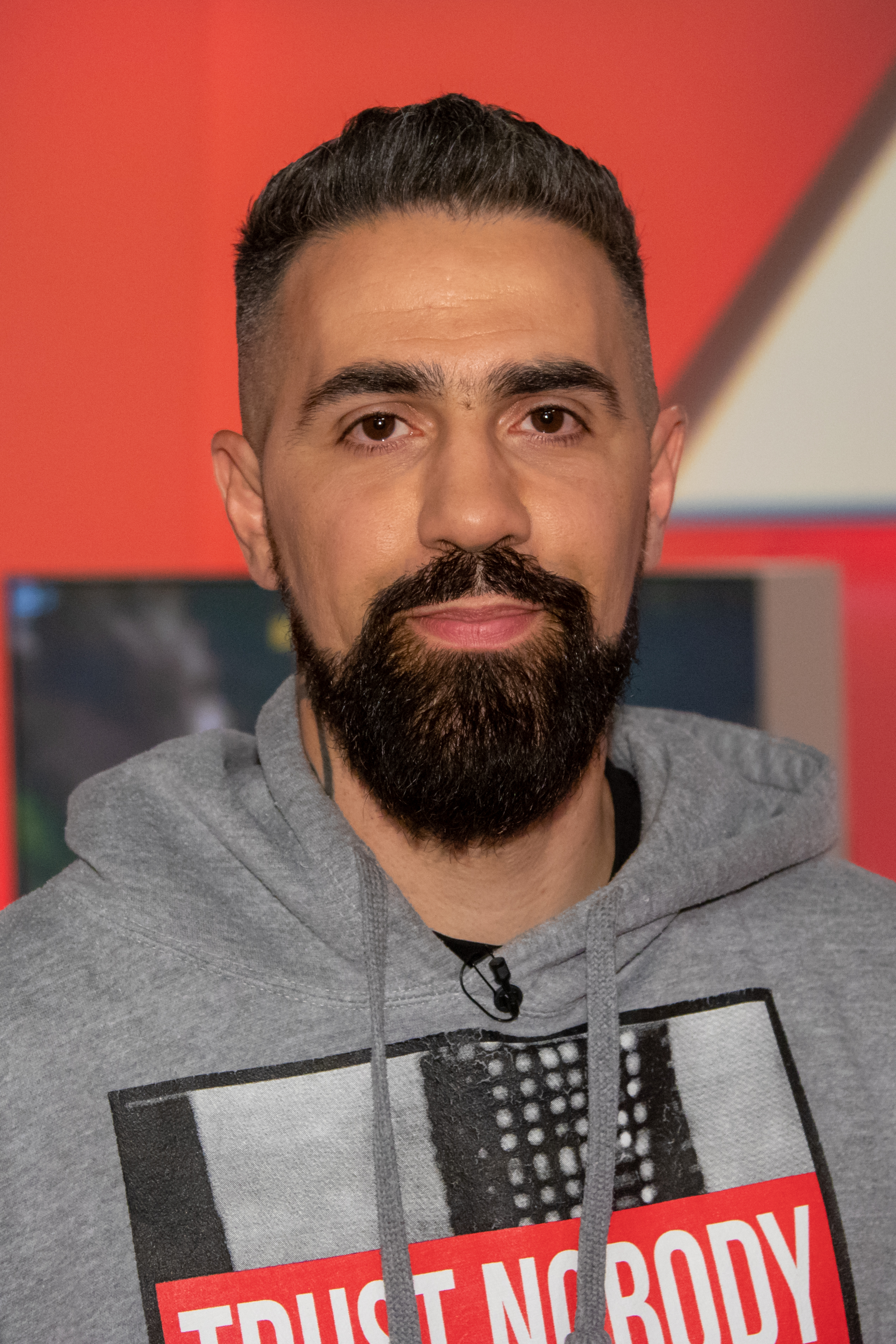
Bushido

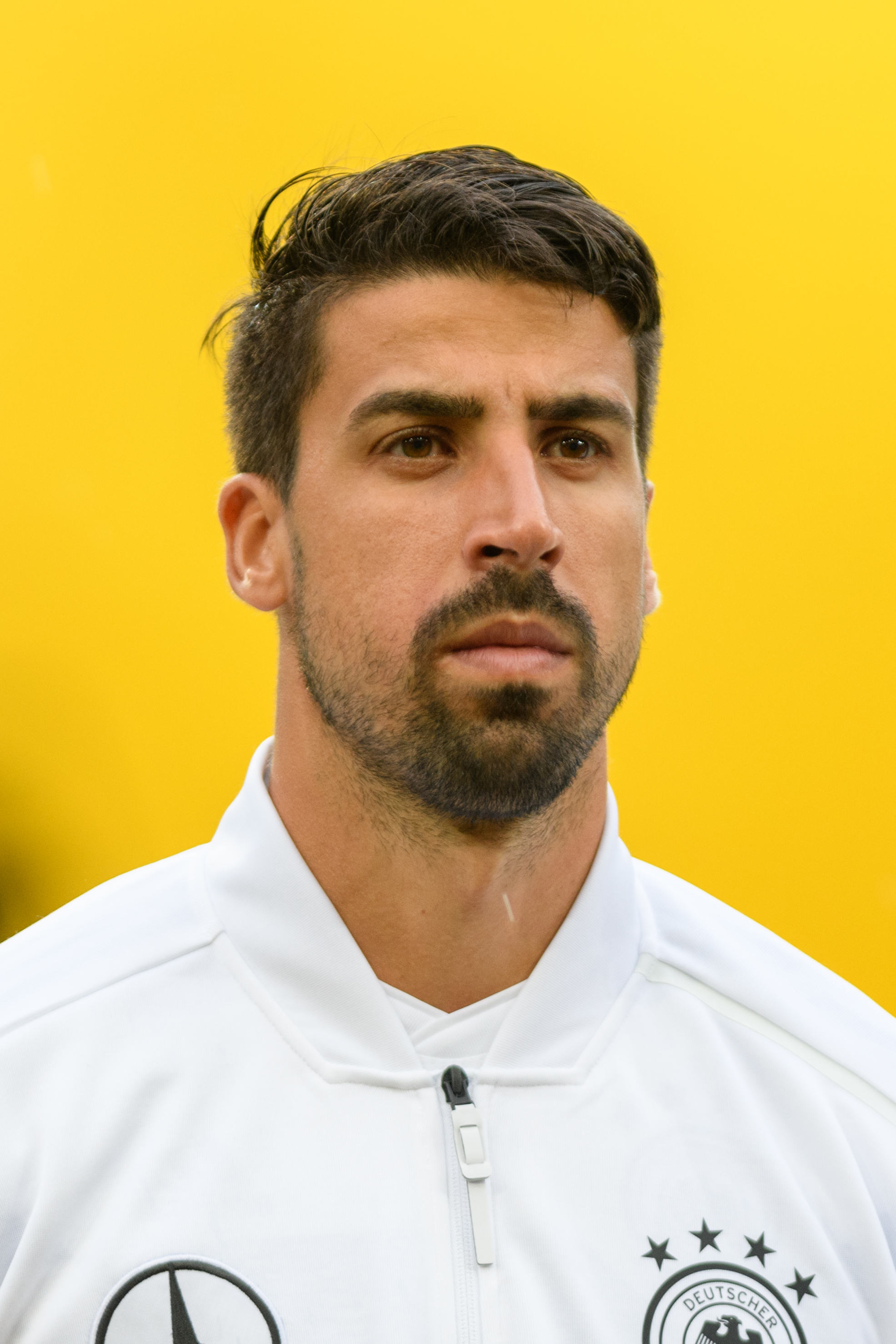
Sami Khedira

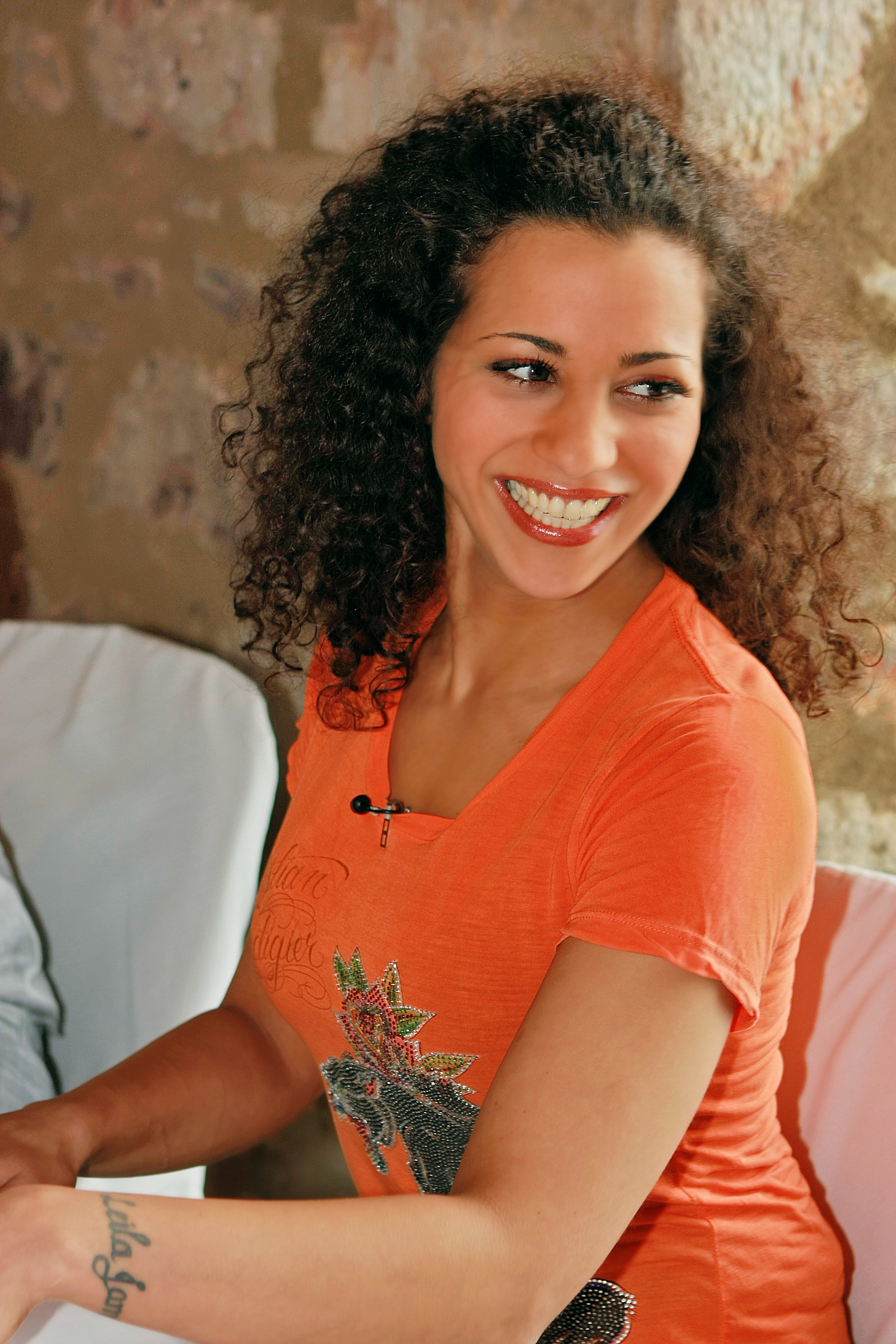
Nadja Benaissa

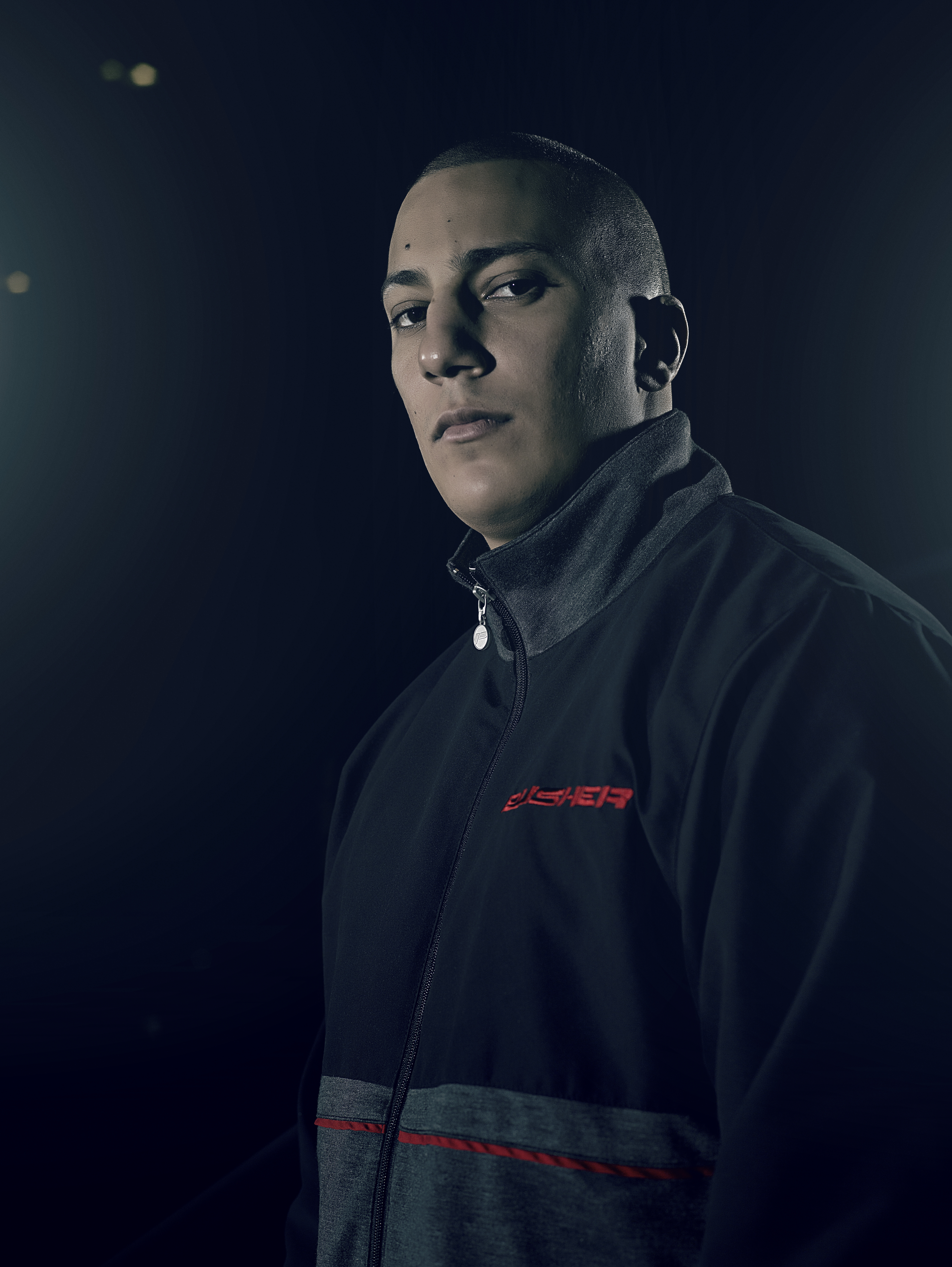
Farid Bang

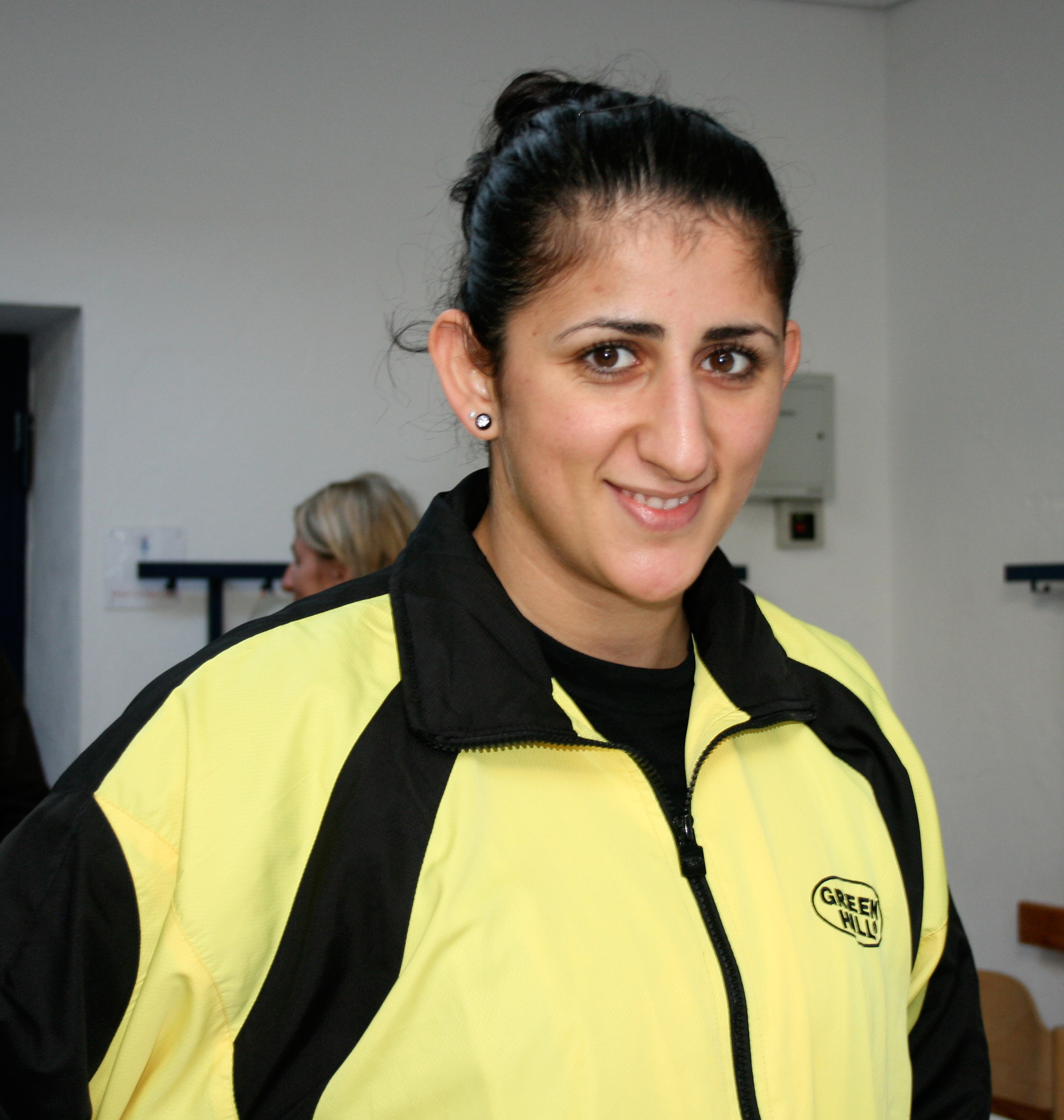
Rola El-Halabi

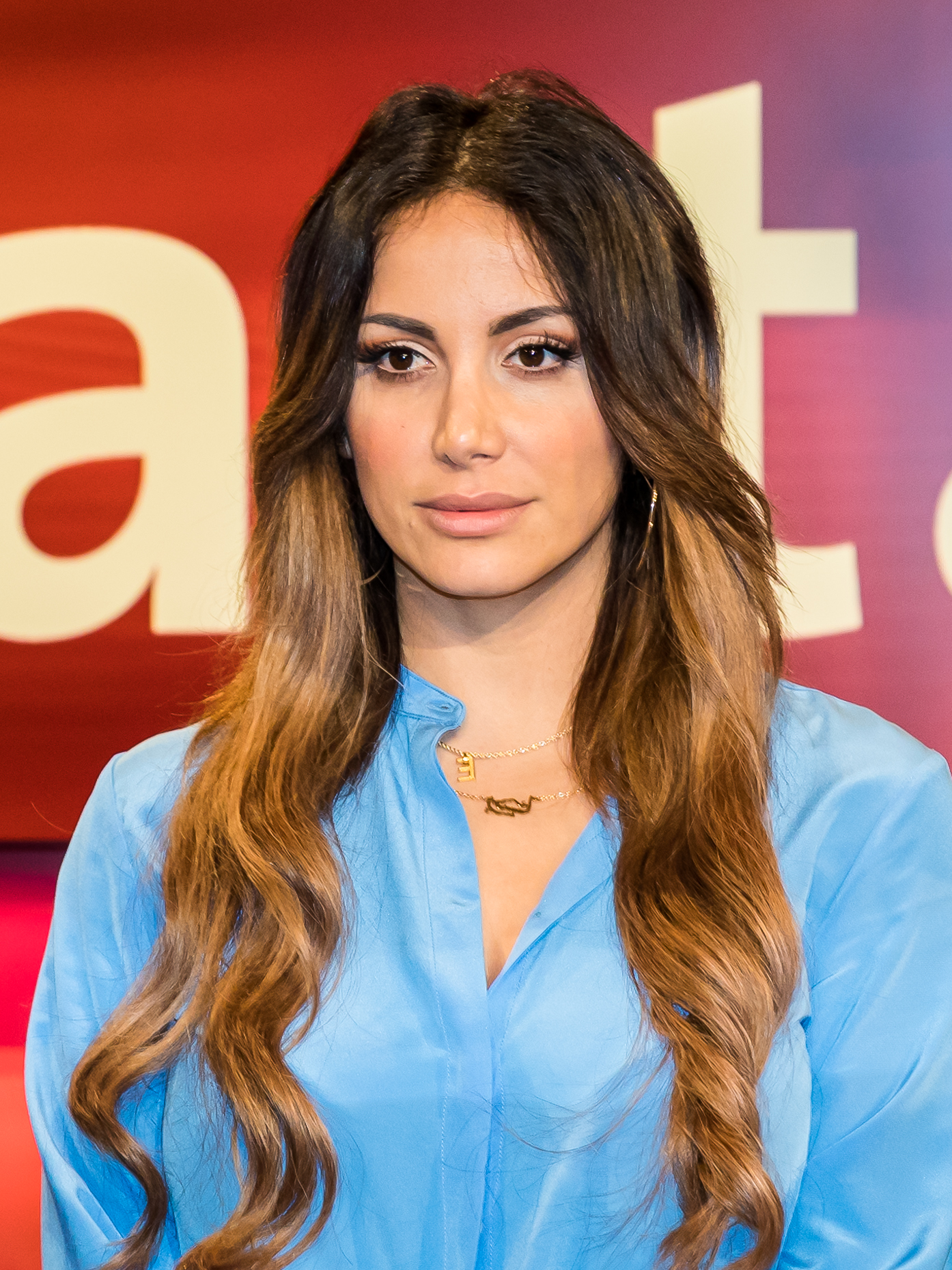
Enissa Amani

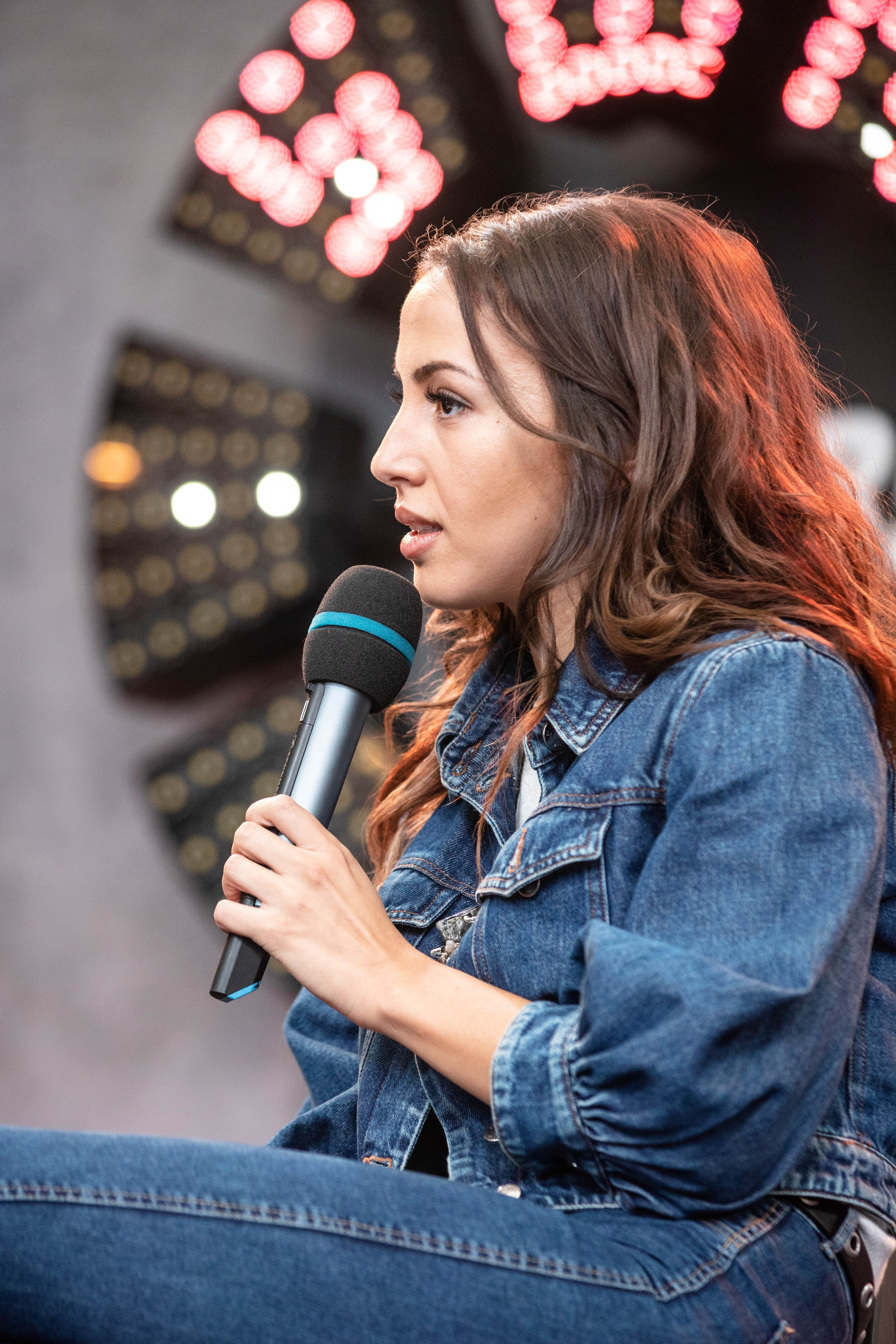
Namika

== See also ==
- Islamic Centre Hamburg
- Islamic dress in Europe
- List of mosques in Germany
- Religion in Germany
- Terrorism in Germany#Islamic terrorism
- Turks in Germany
- Arabs in Germany
- Ahmadiyya in Germany
