= List of German people of Iranian descent =

This is a list of notable individuals of Iranian ancestry who grew up and/or live in Germany.

== Sports ==
- Patrik Baboumian
- Daniel Davari
- Ashkan Dejagah
- Sara Doorsoun
- Benjamin Ebrahimzadeh
- Dennis Eckert
- Alireza Marzban
- Alexander Nouri
- Reza Parkas
- Shervin Radjabali-Fardi
- Babak Rafati
- Amir Shapourzadeh
- Fereydoun Zandi

== Music ==
Rapper

- Nimo
- Fard
- PA Sports
- Kianush
- Sinan-G
- Milonair
- Mosh36
- Animus
- MC Basstard
- Seyed
- Bahar

Rapper & Singer

- Shirin David

Rap-Journalists

- Rooz Lee

Singer

- Mehrzad Marashi - DSDS Winner 2010
- Susan Ebrahimi
- Shahin Najafi
- Navid Akhavan
- Maryam Akhondy
- Ateed
- Sima Bina

Composer

- Ramin Djawadi
- Sima Bina, notable Persian classical musician (singer), composer, researcher, painter
- Amir Abbas Zare, musician and composer

== Academia/science ==
- Katajun Amirpur, scholar
- Nossrat Peseschkian
- Majid Samii
- Rahim Rahmanzadeh, orthopedist

== Arts/entertainment ==
Comedians

- Enissa Amani
- Sina Khani
- Masud Akbarzadeh
- Puyan Yavari

TV presenter

- Melissa Khalaj
- Enissa Amani

Actors

- Daryush Shokof
- Enissa Amani
- Maryam Zaree
- Navid Akhavan
- Shaghayegh Dehghan
- Narges Rashidi
- Melika Foroutan
- Mohammad Khalkhalian
- Shermine Shahrivar
- Fereydoun Farrokhzad, actor, entertainer

Film directors

- Daryush Shokof
- Mohammad Farokhmanesh

Rest

- Akbar Behkalam, painter
- Niloofar Beyzaie, playwright, theatre director
- Yasmine Mahmoudieh, architect, interior designer, and CEO
- Naveed Nour, photographer
- Benny Rebel, photographer
- Hadi Teherani, architect and designer

== Politics ==
- Sahra Wagenknecht, parliamentary chairperson of the Sahra Wagenknecht Alliance (formerly German Left Party), Leader of the Opposition in Germany 2015-2017, chancellor candidate in 2017 and 2025
- Yasmin Fahimi, politician and since January 2014 the general secretary of the Social Democratic Party (SPD).
- Omid Nouripour, Alliance 90/The Greens
- Bahman Nirumand
- Mina Ahadi
- Mitra Razavi
- Shervin Haghsheno
- Reza Asghari

== Media/journalism ==
- Abbas Maroufi, publisher
- Navid Kermani, writer and scholar
- Golineh Atai - TV
- Isabel Schayani - TV
- Natalie Amiri - TV

Alternative journalism

- Ken Jebsen

== Business/technology ==
- Hossein Sabet, entrepreneur, hotel owner worldwide.
- Sandra Navidi, strategic and macroeconomics advisor

== Literature ==
- Shida Bazyar, writer
- Abbas Maroufi, novelist
- Sudabeh Mohafez, writer
- Alexios Schandermani, writer
- Mohammad Khalkhalian, Writer

== Personalities ==
- Soraya Esfandiary, ex-wife of Shah Mohammad Reza Pahlavi and Queen Consort of Iran
- Abdoldjavad Falaturi

== See also ==
- Iranians in Germany
- List of Iranians
- Iranian diaspora
