= List of German people of Lebanese descent =

This is a list of individuals of Lebanese ancestry who are born, grew up and/or live in Germany. The list does not include Libo-Palestinians (List of German people of Palestinian descent)

== Athletes ==
Combat sport

- Mo Abdallah, multiple World Champion in kickboxing
- Mey Alasadi, former multiple German Champion in karate
- Bachir Maroun, kickboxer
- Zeina Nassar - current German Champion in women's boxing
- Khalid Taha - mixed martial artist competing in the UFC

Football

- Mohammad Baghdadi
- Omar Bugiel
- Ihab Darwiche
- Karim Darwich
- Hilal El-Helwe
- Issa Issa
- Bilal Kamarieh
- Reda Khadra - German Under-18 National Team player
- Khaled Mohssen
- Hassan Oumari
- Joan Oumari
- Mahmout Najdi
- Munier Raychouni
- Feiz Shamsin
- Amin Younes - German National Team player
- Daniel Zeaiter
- Said El Mala

Rest

- Benjamin Hassan - Tennis player

== Models ==
- Amina Sabbah - (Miss World Germany 2013) beauty queen and model

== Cinema ==
- Myrna Maakaron - Actress, Filmmaker and Writer

== Musicians ==
Rapper

- MC Bilal
- Tony D [de]
- Elmo
- Hamad 45
- Jamule
- MoTrip
- Baba Saad
- Samra
- Zuna

Rapper and singer

- Mudi (his father is Kurdish and his mother Lebanese)
- Moe Phoenix

Singer

- Akay - pop and R&B singer, entrepreneur and manager of Kollegah
- Rabih Lahoud - jazz musician
- Fady Maalouf - DSDS Finalist 2008
- Tarééc - R&B singer

== Actors ==
- Hassan Akkouch
- David A. Hamade
- Imad Mardnli
- Margit Saad
- Raymond Tarabay

== Directors ==
- Imad Karim - TV films & documentations

== Scientists ==
- Hassan Naim - biochemist
- Bilal Ibrahim : OPHTHALMOLOGIST: Founder of Alpha Augenzentrum, He has received many awards for his contributions in his field

== Publicist ==
- Ralph Ghadban

== Television ==
- Aline Abboud - journalist and TV presenter

== See also ==
- Lebanese people in Germany
- List of Lebanese people
- List of Lebanese people (Diaspora)
