= Najdi =

Najdi may refer to:

- People of Najd
- Najdi (surname)
- Najdi Arabic, a variety of the Arabic language
- Najdi (sheep), a breed of sheep
- Najdi!, a Macedonian search-engine
