= Reza Parkas =

Iranian-German football manager

Personal information
- Date of birth: 5 April 1968 (age 58)
- Place of birth: Khorramshahr, Iran

Team information
- Current team: Brothers Union (Technical Director)

Managerial career
- Years: Team
- 2005–2006: Buderich
- 2006–2007: SSV Strümp
- 2008–2009: Emirates (assistant)
- 2009–2010: Hatta
- 2012–2013: Sanat Naft (Technical Director)
- 2013–2015: Emirates (Technical Director)
- 2015–2016: Fujairah (Technical Director)
- 2016–2018: Al-Orouba SC
- 2018–2019: Sanat Naft (assistant)
- 2019–2020: Brothers Union
- 2021: Brothers Union
- 2022: Istaravshan
- 2022: Sanat Naft
- 2024: Turkestan
- 2025–: Brothers Union (Technical Director)

Reza Parkas (Persian: رضا پرکاس; born 5 April 1968) is an Iranian-born Iranian-German football manager.

== Coaching career ==
Parkas is an Iranian born Iranian-German football coach, and has coaching experience in Germany, the UAE, Iran, and Oman. Parkas also worked as a fourth Referee and massager in Germany. He was the head coach of the Brothers Union club.

Parkas was named as Istaravshan's Head Coach during their squad announcement for the 2022 Tajikistan Higher League season.
