= Ibn Rushd-Goethe Mosque =

Liberal mosque in Berlin, Germany

- Ibn-Rushd-Goethe-Moschee
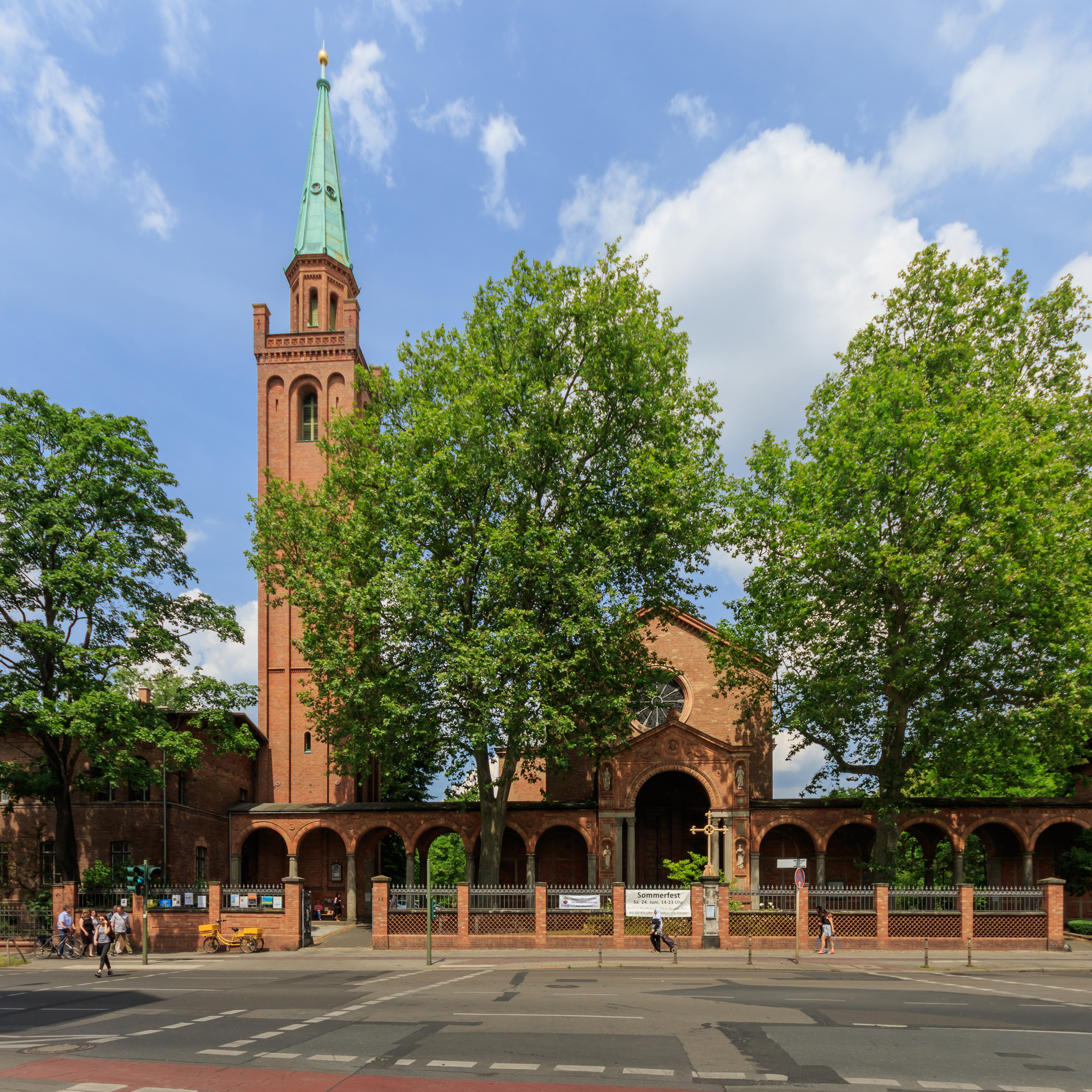
- The mosque was located in a part of the building of the Johanniskirche in Berlin-Moabit between June 2017 and October 2020 before it was relocated to Alt-Moabit

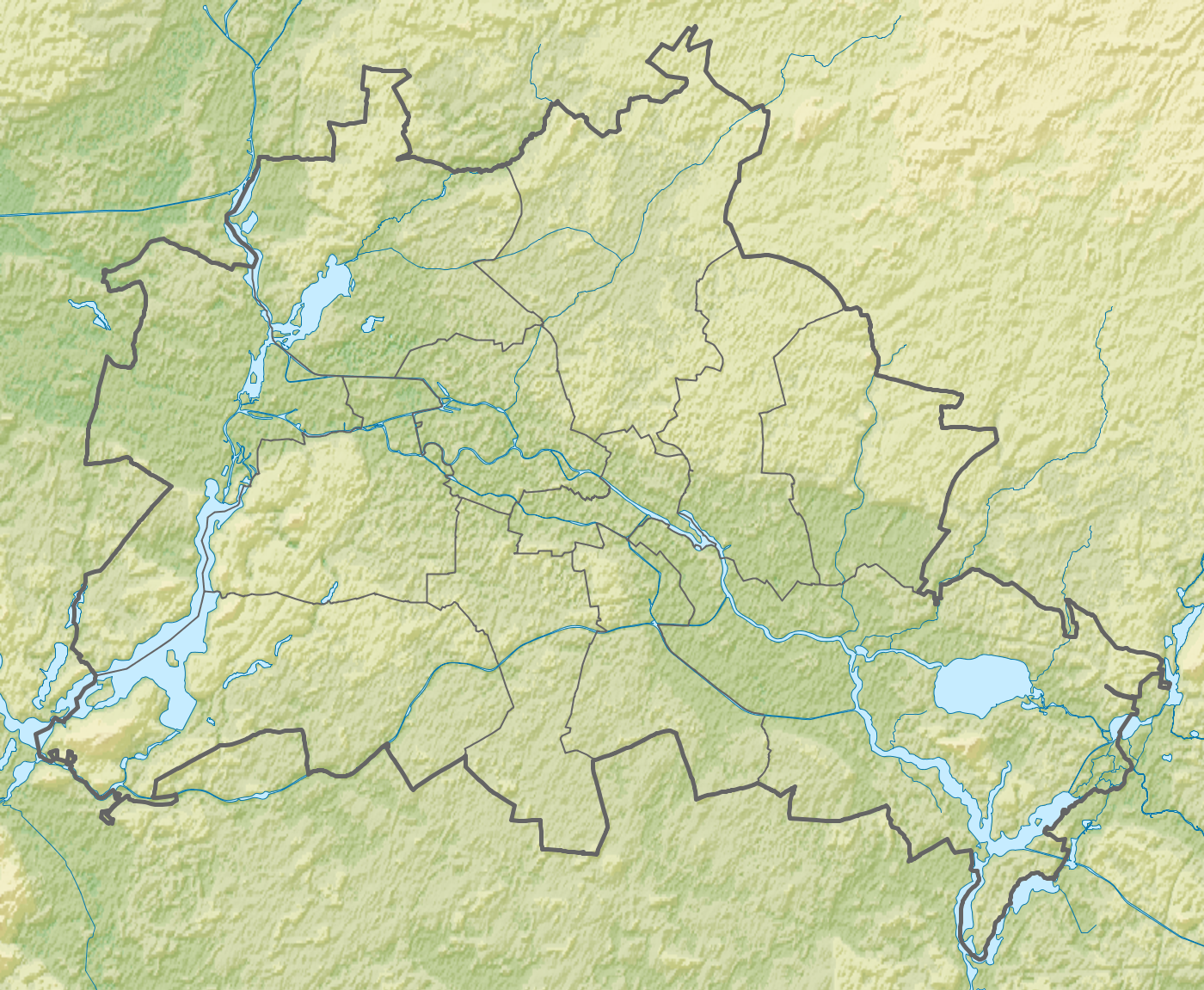
- Location of the mosque in Berlin

Religion
- Affiliation: Islam
- Branch/tradition: Liberal Islam

Location
- Location: Ottostraße 16, Alt-Moabit, Mitte, Berlin
- Country: Germany
- Interactive map of Ibn Rushd-Goethe Mosque
- Coordinates: 52°31′34″N 13°20′09″E

Architecture
- Founder: Seyran Ateş
- Completed: 2017

Website
- ibn-rushd-goethe-moschee.de (in German)

The Ibn Rushd-Goethe Mosque (German: Ibn-Rushd-Goethe-Moschee; Arabic: مسجد ابن رشد - جوته) is a mosque in the Mitte district of Berlin, Germany. It is the only self-described liberal mosque in the country and the first in the world. Founded in June 2017 by Seyran Ateş, a German lawyer and Muslim feminist of Turkish and Kurdish descent, the mosque was named in honour of medieval Andalusian-Arabic polymath Ibn Rushd and German writer and statesman Johann Wolfgang von Goethe. The liberal mosque bans face-covering, allows women and men to pray together, and accepts LGBT worshippers.

== Overview ==
The mosque is open to Sunni, Shia and other Muslims. Full-face veils, such as burqas or niqabs, are not allowed. Men and women pray together in the mosque and women are not obligated to wear a headscarf. Furthermore, gay and lesbian Muslims are allowed to enter the mosque and can worship. It is the first mosque of its kind in the world.

Founder Seyran Ateş said:

"We need a historical-critical exegesis of the Quran. A scripture from the 7th century one may not and cannot take literally. We stand for a reading of the Quran which is oriented to mercifulness, love of God and most of all to peace. [The mosque is a] place for all those people who do not meet the rules and regulations of conservative Muslims."

— Seyran Ateş, June 2017

== History ==
The mosque was founded on 16 June 2017 by Seyran Ateş, a German lawyer and feminist of Turkish and Kurdish descent. It was named after the Andalusian-Arabic polymath, Ibn Rushd (also known as Averroes), and the German writer and statesman, Goethe.

Ateş told news magazine Der Spiegel that “no one will be let in with a niqab or burqa veil. This is for security reasons and also it is our belief that full-face veils have nothing to do with religion, but rather are a political statement.” She told the journalists that she was inspired by Wolfgang Schäuble, the German Minister of Finance, who told her that liberal Muslims should band together.

In July 2022, the mosque became the first in Germany to raise a rainbow flag, in support of the LGBT community.

== Reactions ==
Following massive threats after the opening, the founders of the mosque commented on the immense intimidation that liberal Muslims faced. They asked for tolerance and respect with regard to their reading of the Quran. The personal security for Ateş was increased significantly after evaluation by the State Criminal Police Office of Berlin. In July 2017, Ateş reported that she had received about 100 death threats since the mosque's opening.

Turkish mass media displayed the Rushd-Goethe Mosque as part of the Gülen movement, a claim denied by Ercan Karakoyun, chairman of the Gülen-affiliated foundation in Germany Stiftung Dialog und Bildung. The claim was also denied by the mosque itself. Turkish media were critical, and Ateş received threats and hostility, both from radical and enemies and critics of Islam, in Germany and abroad.

The fatwa institution in Egypt, the Egyptian Fatwa Council at the Al-Azhar University, labelled the mosque an attack on Islam, and declared a fatwa against the mosque. The Turkish religious authority and the Egyptian authority condemned Ateş' project and Ateş subsequently received death threats. The fatwa encompassed all present and future liberal mosques.

== See also ==
- Islam in Germany
- LGBTQ people and Islam
- List of fatwas
- List of mosques in Germany
- Religion in Berlin
- Women in Islam
