= Najdi (surname) =

Najdi is a surname. Notable people with the surname include:

- Bijan Najdi (1941–1997), Iranian writer
- Bilal Najdi (born 1993), Lebanese footballer
- Mahmoud Najdi (born 1989), Lebanese footballer
- Omar Najdi (born 1986), Moroccan footballer
