= Seyran Ateş: Sex, Revolution and Islam =

- Directed by: Nefise Özkal Lorentzen
- Written by: Nefise Özkal Lorentzen
- Narrated by: Seyran Ateş
- Cinematography: Anders Hoft
- Edited by: Morten Haslerud
- Music by: Andreu Jacob
- Production company: Integral Film
- Release date: 1 October 2021 (Norway)
- Running time: 81 minutes
- Country: Norway

Seyran Ateş: Sex, Revolution and Islam is a 2021 Norwegian documentary film about Seyran Ateş, a German lawyer and Muslim feminist. It was directed and written by Nefise Özkal Lorentzen.

== Plot ==
The documentary follows Ateş, a Muslim girl from the slums in Turkey. She becomes a female leader, challenging her own religion and culture. Her personal and ideological advocacy brings her into contact with women from around the world, from women sex workers in a German brothel to traditional female imams in China. She has been shot, received death threats, and now lives under constant police protection.

She founded a mosque in Berlin where men, women, and members of the LGBTQ community pray together. She is one of the few female imams in the world. Today, Seyran Ates is a Turkish-German lawyer and bisexual feminist who advocates for a sexual revolution within Islam.

== Cast ==
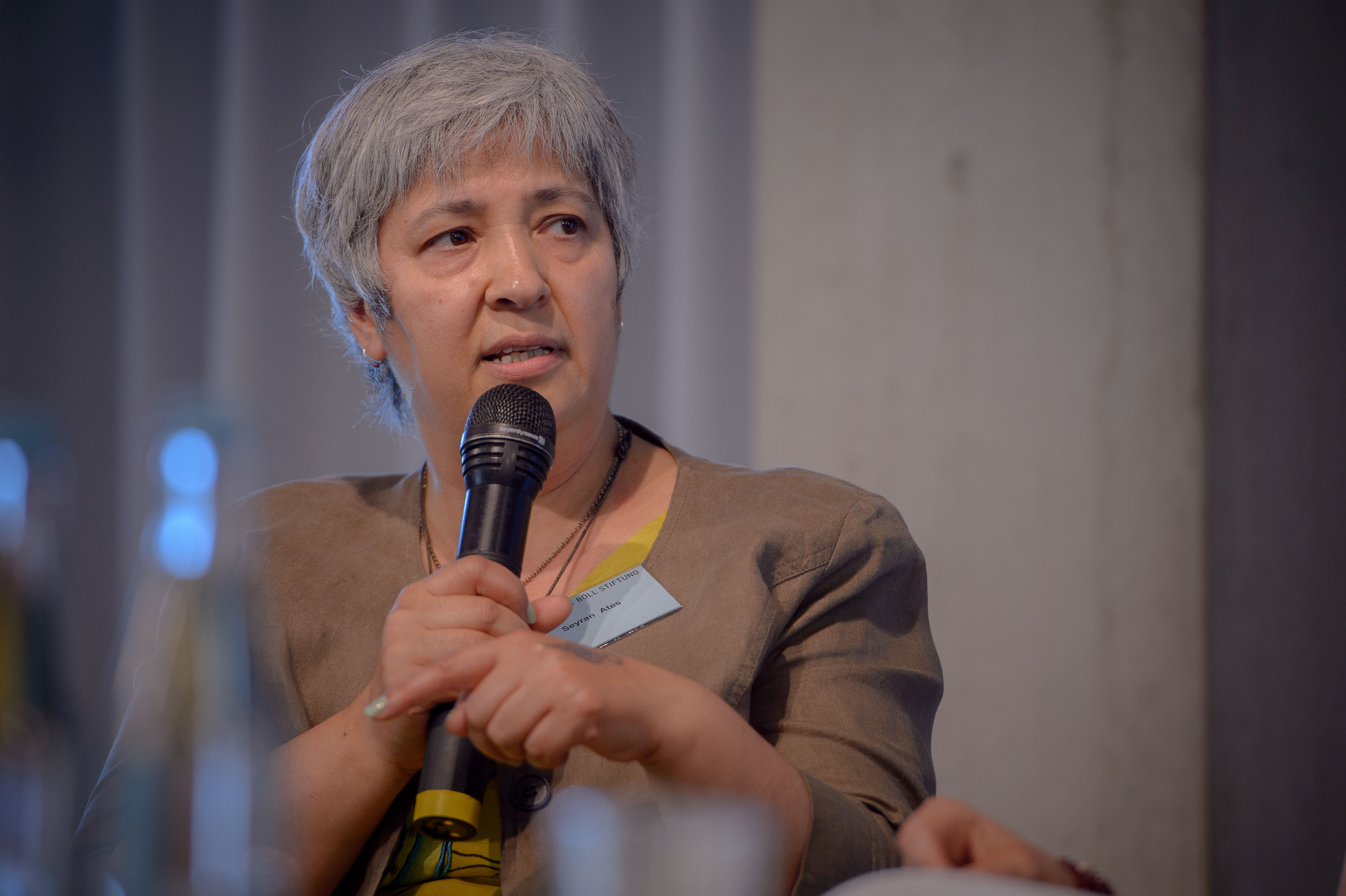
Seyran Ateş

- Bayan Amin
- Hatun Ateş
- Seyran Ateş
- Naïma Ferré (whirling dervish)
- Claire Fontanille (whirling dervish)
- Håkon Haugsbø
- Nazneen Khan-Østrem
- Usman Rana
- Lara Rashid
- Mustafa Rashid
- Serpil Sarac
- Tugay Sarac
- Elisabeth Thorsen

== Release and reception ==
The film was premiered at the Copenhagen International Documentary Festival (CPH:DOX) in April 2021.

Roxana Hadadi of the Los Angeles Times expressed frustration with the documentary, saying "Lorentzen’s one-side-only methodology makes Seyran Ateş: Sex, Revolution and Islam a lopsided viewing experience, one that seems tailor made for viewers predisposed to agreeing with Ateş’s critical opinions on Muslims, and no one else".

Dennis Harvey of the 48hills said "Nefise Ozkal Lorentzen’s documentary has some mannered, staged elements that are an unnecessary distraction. But its content (which includes graphic footage of several terrorist attacks), and subject, have a galvanizing power nonetheless."

== Awards and nominations ==
The film was long-listed for an Oscar at the 94th Academy Awards. In the United States, it was named Best Documentary Feature at the New York City Independent Film Festival (2022). It was awarded the Audience Award for Best Documentary Feature at Fire!! Mostra Barcelona LGBT FILM Festival (2022) in Spain. It was also named Best Documentary Feature at the International Queer Film Festival Merlinka (2022) in Serbia.

The film was selected for competition and nominated for awards at several major international film festivals:

Year	Festival	Award	Category	Result	Ref
2021	Bergen International Film Festival	Checkpoints Award	Human Rights Documentary	Nominated	
2021	CPH:DOX	NORDIC:DOX Award	Nordic Documentary	Nominated	
2021	Hot Docs Canadian International Documentary Festival	Audience Award	Best Documentary	Nominated	
2021	Norwegian International Film Festival	Audience Award	Best Film	Nominated	
2021	Oslo Films from the South Festival	DOC: South Award	Best Documentary	Nominated	
2021	San Francisco International Film Festival	Golden Gate Award	Best Documentary Feature	Nominated	
2021	Vermont International Film Festival	People's Choice Award	Audience Award	Nominated	
2022	Cinema for Peace Awards		Women's Empowerment	Nominated	
2022	New York City Independent Film Festival	Festival Award	Best Documentary Feature	Won	
2022	Fire!! Mostra Barcelona LGBT Film Festival	Audience Award	Best Documentary Feature	Won	
2022	International Queer Film Festival Merlinka	Festival Award	Best Documentary Feature	Won	
