= Islamophobia in Germany =

Prejudice towards Islam or Muslims in Germany

Islamophobia in Germany refers to the set of discourses, behaviors and structures which express feelings of anxiety, fear, hostility and rejection towards Islam and/or Muslims in Germany. Islamophobia can manifest itself through discrimination in the workforce, negative coverage in the media, and violence against Muslims. Crimes against mosques in Germany decreased by 16% in 2025 compared to 2024, despite Islamic terrorist threats being the most prevalent in Germany.

== See also ==
- German Freedom Party (2010-2016)
- Alternative for Germany (2013-since)
- Murder of Marwa El-Sherbini
