= Seyran Ateş =

German lawyer and Muslim feminist

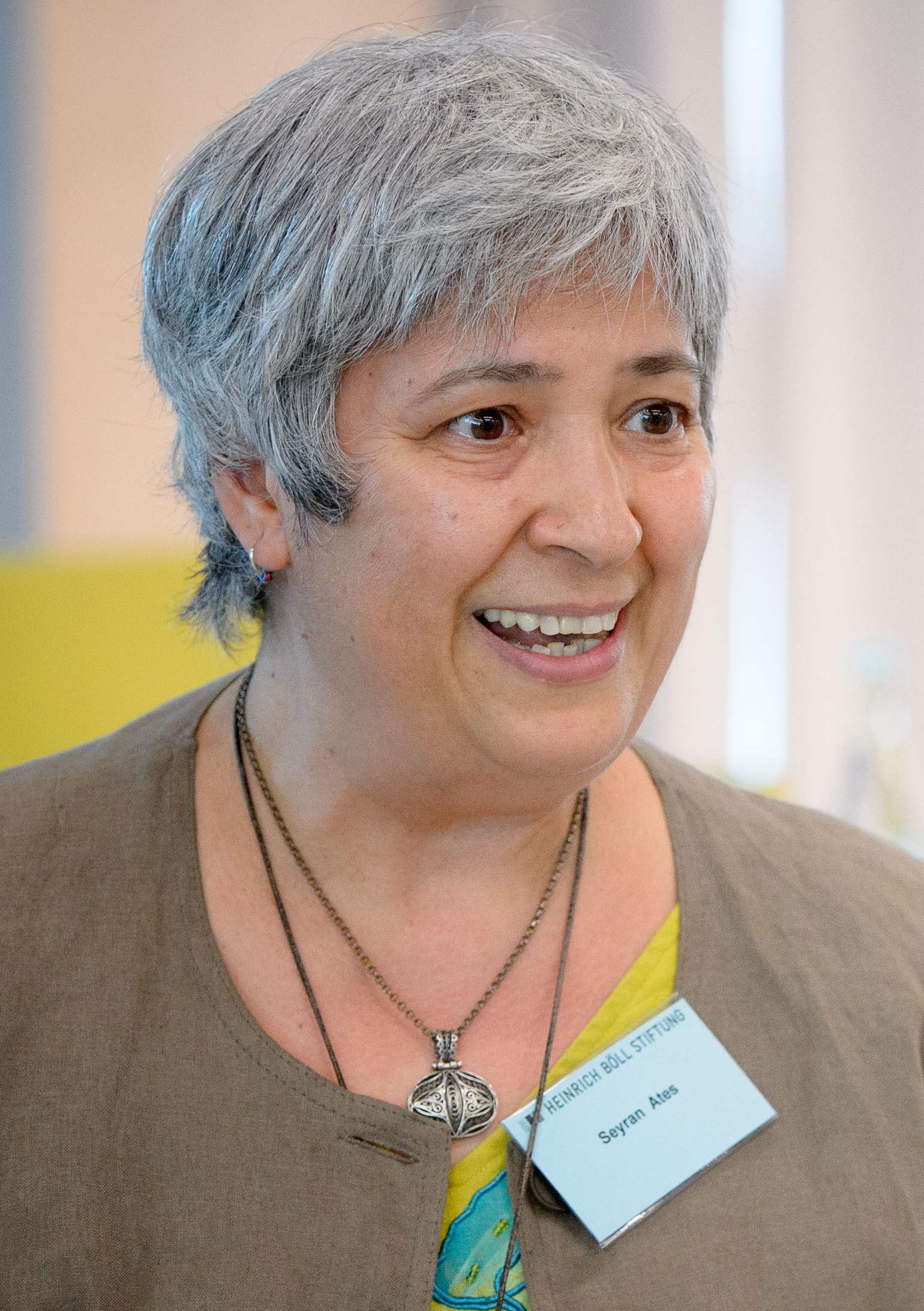
- Born: Istanbul, Turkey
- Education: Free University of Berlin
- Occupations: Lawyer and Feminist
- Known for: Founder of Ibn Ruschd-Goethe mosque

Seyran Ateş (born 20 April 1963) is a German lawyer and a Muslim feminist. She founded the Ibn Ruschd-Goethe mosque in 2017, as Germany's first liberal place of worship for Muslims. Ateş claim to challenge conventional ideas in Islamic teaching by opening a mosque in Berlin and alleges to break with traditionalist precepts of what being a Muslim means.

== Early life ==
Ateş was born in Istanbul, Turkey to a Turkish mother and a Kurdish father. Her family moved to West Berlin when she was six years old, during the period of the 1961-1973 West-German recruitment agreement with Turkey (see: Anwerbeabkommen zwischen der Bundesrepublik Deutschland und der Türkei. During these 12 years 867,000 Turkish citizens came to West-Germany, of whom 367,000 remained in the country (see: Turks in Germany). As she matured Ateş felt increasingly at odds with the rigid expectations within her family. At the age of 17 she left home to avoid an arranged marriage. Ateş excelled at school, and went on to study law at the Free University of Berlin.

== Career ==
While working at a women's centre in 1984, she was shot in the neck by a Turkish nationalist ("his exact motives unclear" even a generation later, according to the New York Times). The client she was counseling was killed by the attacker, and Ateş, during her long recuperation, decided to devote herself even more to helping Turkish-background women achieve their rights in Germany. She has practiced law since 1997, specializing in criminal law and family law.

Her views, highly critical of an immigrant Muslim society that is often more conservative than its counterpart in Turkey, have put her at risk. Her German-language book, Islam needs a sexual revolution, was scheduled for publication in Germany in 2009. In an interview in January 2008 on National Public Radio, Ateş stated that she was in hiding, and would not be working on Muslim women's behalf publicly (including in court), due to the threats against her. In one particular incident, she and her client were attacked by a woman's husband in a German courthouse in front of onlookers who did nothing.

Ateş opened the Ibn Ruschd-Goethe mosque in 2017, located in a church. It is the only liberal mosque in Germany, that is, one where men and women pray together, and women can take the role of imam leading a prayer. The Turkish religious authority and the Egyptian Fatwa Council at the Al-Azhar University have condemned her project, and she has received death threats. The fatwa encompassed all present and future liberal mosques.

According to Ateş, many liberal Muslims do not come forward due to threats and fear.

In May 2018 she became an ambassador for the registered association intaktiv e.V., which opposes the circumcision of male children. (see Circumcision controversies#Controversy in Germany.) She is a member of the advisory board of the Institute for Secular Law.

The 2021 documentary Seyran Ateş: Sex, Revolution and Islam features her life as a feminist, lawyer and mosque founder. The film qualified for 24 film festivals worldwide and received mostly positive reviews.

== Honours ==
In 2005, she was nominated for the Nobel Peace Prize as part of the project 1000 peacewomen.

In March 2007 Ates was awarded a prize for defense of human rights by her alma mater.

In October 2019 Ates won the University of Oslo's Human Rights Award.

== Selected works ==
- "Bei Trennung: Tod", in: Robertson-von Trotha, Caroline Y. (ed.): Tod und Sterben in der Gegenwartsgesellschaft. Eine interdisziplinäre Auseinandersetzung (= Kulturwissenschaft interdisziplinär/Interdisciplinary Studies on Culture and Society, Vol. 3), Baden-Baden 2008
- Große Reise ins Feuer: Die Geschichte einer deutschen Türkin, Reinbek bei Hamburg 2006
- "Individualität: Ich sein oder Ich haben?", in: Flensburger Hefte, Nr. 87, Flensburg 2005
