= Amir Abbas Zare =

Iranian classical musician and composer

- Born: Tehran, Iran
- Genres: Persian traditional music
- Occupation(s): Musician and composer
- Instrument(s): Setar and Daf (Percussion)
- Years active: 1997–present

Amir Abbas Zare (Persian: امیر عباس زارع) (born 24 December in Tehran, Iran) is an Iranian classical musician and composer. He is currently living in Cologne, Germany.

At the age of two he left Iran with his parents and immigrated to Germany. Later at the age of 6 he began studying the piano, his first instrument. Since 1993 he began with lessons of the Setar, which became his main instrument later.

He also plays with the Singer Maestra Sima Bina.

From 1997 he was professionally involved in music and began performing on various festivals like the well-known "Falun Folk Festival" in Sweden and many many others.

The Setarist and Composer has already passed through several master classes. In 2012, he was responsible for the Film Music of movie The Physician as a supervisor.
