= Enissa Amani =

Iranian-German comedian and activist

- انیسا امانی
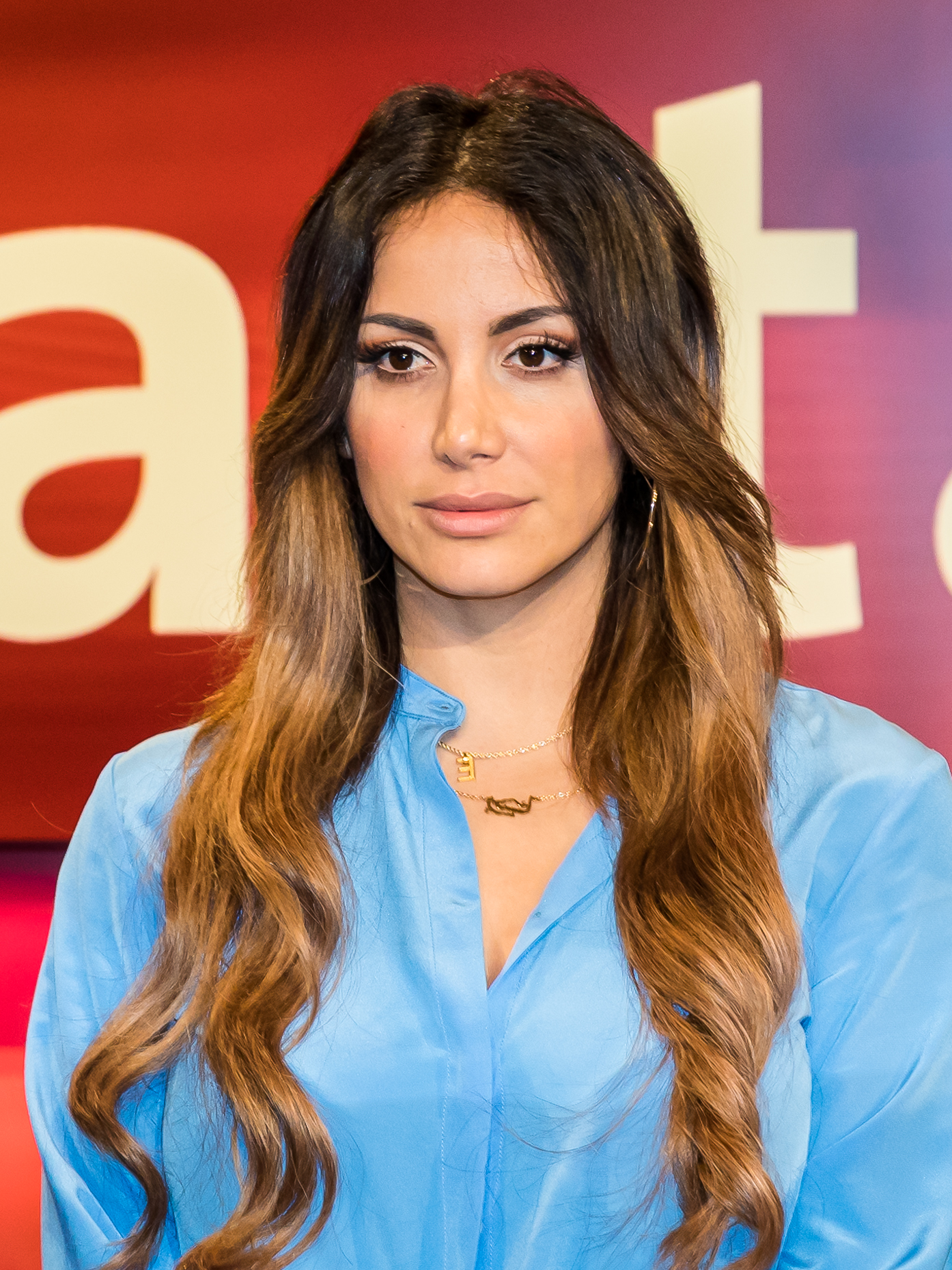
- Amani in 2018
- Born: 8 December 1981 (age 44); Tehran, Iran
- Occupations: Comedian; television presenter; activist; artist
- Website: enissaamani.de

Enissa Amani (Persian: انیسا امانی; born 8 December 1981 in Tehran, Iran) is an Iranian-German comedian, artist and activist. She was the first European Woman with an international Netflix special in 2018 called "Ehrenwort" and a follow-up short-special called "Comedians of the World" also on Netflix. She produced and hosted a viral panel talk about racism called "Die beste Instanz" in 2020, which led her to win the German Grimme Online Award; the Grimme Award is one of the most prestigious German television awards. Her comedy often focuses on the subjects of politics, social issues, racism, and ethnicity.

== Life and career ==
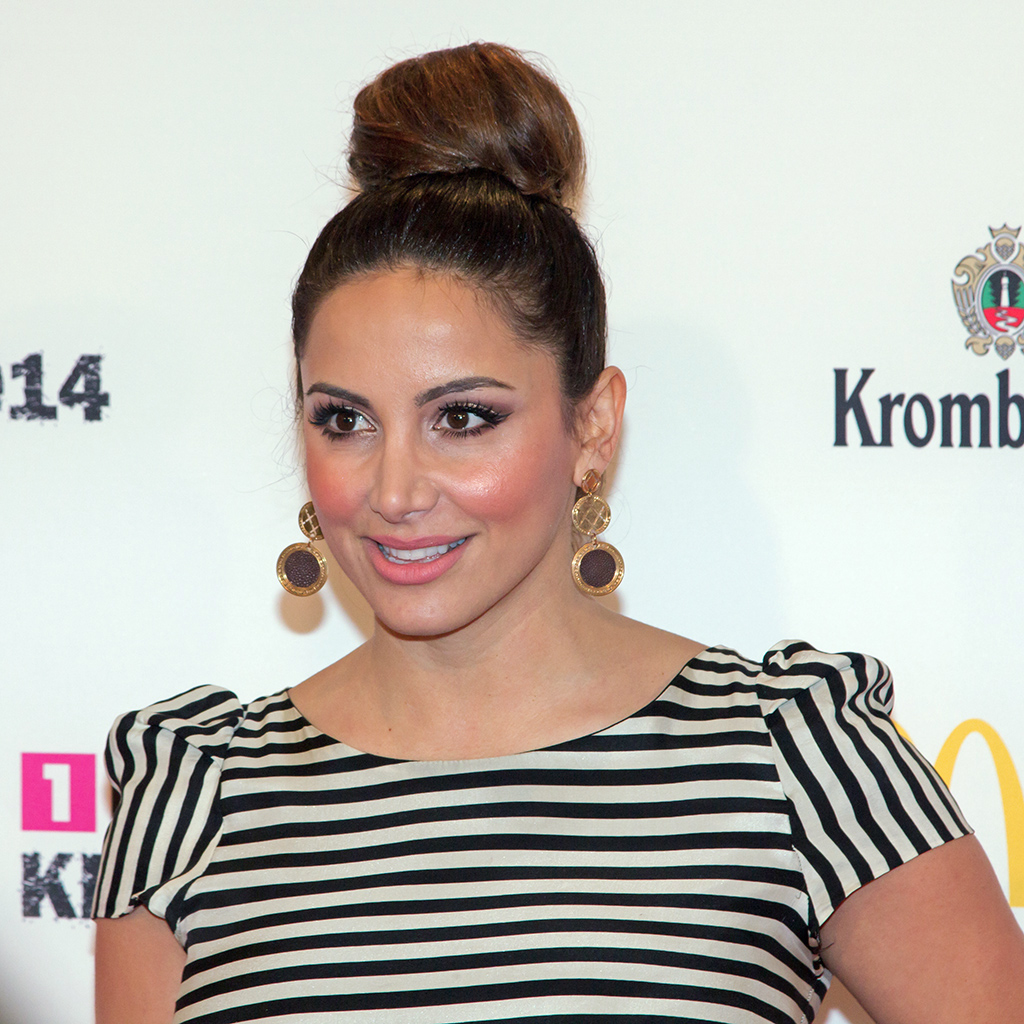
Amani in 2014

Amani studied law at the University of Cologne in Germany and won several beauty pageants, such as Miss West-Germany. She quit law to study literature and philosophy and presented as a host on QVC for only a few months before she went to an open mic in 2013. Shortly thereafter, she appeared in several German TV and late night shows and won the German Comedy Award "Deutscher Comedy Preis" for best Newcomer of the Year in 2015. TV total, NightWash, The Satire Summit and Stand-up Migrants.

In 2014 she was nominated for the Prix Pantheon (jury prize). On 2 January 2015, she took part on the RTL comedy Grand Prix. In 2015, she was a contestant on the RTL Show Let's Dance with Christian Polanc as dancing partner, a multiple winner on the show. The duo took fourth place. In 2018 she was the first German and first European woman with an international Netflix Special "Ehrenwort" And a second one “Comedians of the World” in 2019. In 2020 she created, produced, and hosted a show about racism called "Die beste Instanz" which led her to win the prestigious German Grimme Online Preis. Since 2019 she is a prominent activist for human rights targeting racism in Germany, human rights in Iran, Sexism, Afghanistan, Antisemitism and Islamophobia. She is regularly invited by politicians to hold speeches such as on the Frankfurt Römerberg for Black Live Matter in 2020 and Woman Life Freedom in 2022. Since 2019 she started doing English standup and had shows in the Soho Theatre in London and appearances at the Laugh Factory Los Angeles, and the Comedy Cellar New York. The German Broadcaster ZDF accompanied her to New York for the Documentary "Heroes". On Instagram she is followed by the German foreign minister and several German high ranking politicians. In November 2022 she went viral with a clip from her appearance on the Political Satirical Show "Die Anstalt" with a speech about humanity.

In March 2024, to commemorate the 65th anniversary of International Women's Day, Amani was one of a number of female celebrities had their likeness turned into Barbie dolls.

In September 2025 Amani joined the Global Sumud Flotilla to protest the Gaza war. Amani left the flotilla due to a medical condition, shortly before all the Flotilla's 42 vessels were seized by Israeli forces by 3 October 2025.

She won several awards:

- 2015: Deutscher Comedy Preis "Best Newcomer"
- 2019: "Glammy Award" Charakter des Jahres 2019 Character of the year 2019 from the Glamour Germany-Magazin
- 2021: Grimme Online Preis for "Die beste Instanz"
- 2022: Emotion Magazin Award
- 2022: "Hamza Kurtovic" Award for fight against Racism
- 2022: Hurz Award außerordentliche Leistungen für die Gesellschaft

== Films (selection) ==
- 2014: Ladies' Night (comedy)
- 2014: The Satire Summit (comedy)
- 2015: Let’s Dance (reality competition)
- 2015: Fack ju Göhte 2 (film)
- 2018: Enissa Amani: Ehrenwort (stand-up comedy)
- 2019: Enissa Amani "Comedians of the World" (standup comedy) Netflix
