= Mahmoud Najdi =

Lebanese-German footballer

Personal information
- Full name: Mahmoud Najdi
- Date of birth: 1 January 1989 (age 37)
- Place of birth: Witten, Germany
- Height: 1.75 m (5 ft 9 in)
- Position: Midfielder

Youth career
- 2006–2007: VfL Bochum
- 2007–2008: MSV Duisburg

Senior career*
Years	Team	Apps	(Gls)
2008–2010	Wuppertaler SV	16	(0)
2010–2011	Fortuna Düsseldorf II	27	(2)
2012–2013	Schwarz-Weiß Essen	53	(15)
2013–2014	TV Jahn Hiesfeld	24	(2)
2016–2017	TuS Bövinghausen	20	(15)
2017–	TuS Hannibal	36	(16)

International career
	Lebanon U20	5	(2)
- * Club domestic league appearances and goals as of 15 August 2020

Mahmoud Najdi (Arabic: مَحْمُود نَجْدِيّ; born 1 January 1989) is a professional footballer who plays as a midfielder for German club TuS Hannibal. Born in Germany, Najdi is of Lebanese descent and represented Lebanon internationally at youth level.

== Club career ==
The midfielder played in the 3. Liga for Wuppertaler SV Borussia.
