= List of German people of Palestinian descent =

This is a list of individuals of Palestinian ancestry who grew up and/or live in Germany.

== Athletes ==
- Dani Schahin - football player
- Amir Falahen - football player
- Mayada Al-Sayad - long-distance runner

== Musicians ==
Rapper

- Massiv
- Ali Bumaye
- Samy
- Sahira

Singer

- Tarééc - R&B
- Amir-John Haddad - multi-instrumentalist
- Ahmed Eid - neofolk

== Politicians ==
- Sawsan Chebli

== Actors ==
- Mohamed Issa

== Film directors ==
- Lexi Alexander

== Miscellaneous ==
- Arafat Abou-Chaker - entrepreneur, owner of a record label, member of a well-known clan
- Malcolm Ohanwe - journalist
- Mouhanad Khorchide - professor for Islamic theology at the University of Münster.

== See also ==
- Lebanese people in Germany (include Libo-Palestinians)
- List of Palestinians
- Palestinian Diaspora
