= List of German people of Kurdish descent =

This is a list of notable individuals who are of full or partial Kurdish origin who grew up and/or live in Germany.

== Academia and Medicine ==
- Jamal Nebez, linguist, mathematician, politician, author, translator and writer
- Bachtyar Ali, novelist, intellectual, literary critic, essayist, and poet
- Rauf Ceylan, German-Turkish sociologist and author
- Khalil Rashow, academic, writer, and researcher
- Nadia Murad – human rights activist and Nobel Peace Prize laureate
- Khanna Omarkhali - academic and researcher
- Gülşen Aktaş, educator

== Artists ==
- Shwan Kamal
- Bahzad Sulaiman – performance maker and visual artist

== Athletes ==
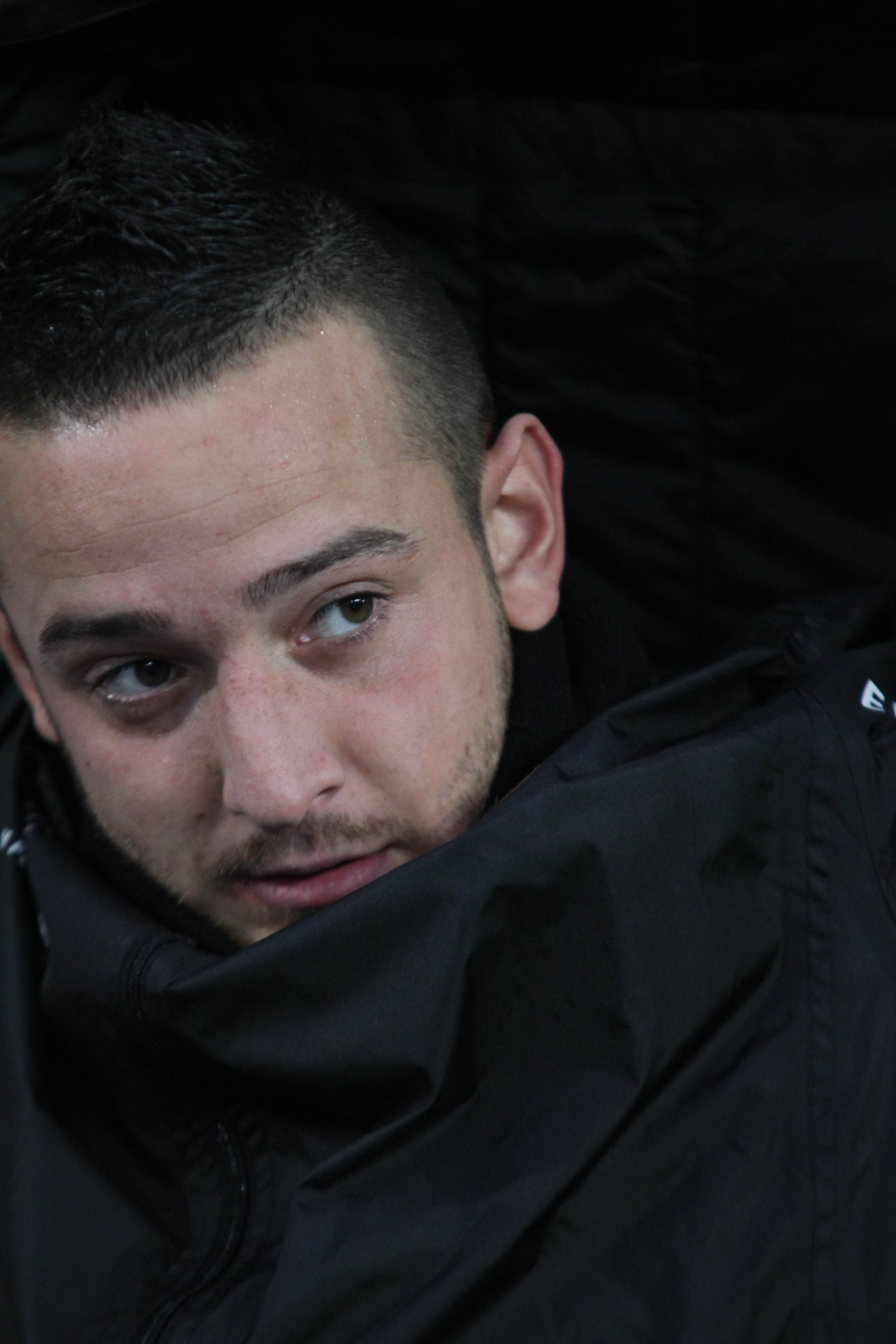
Deniz Naki (2012)

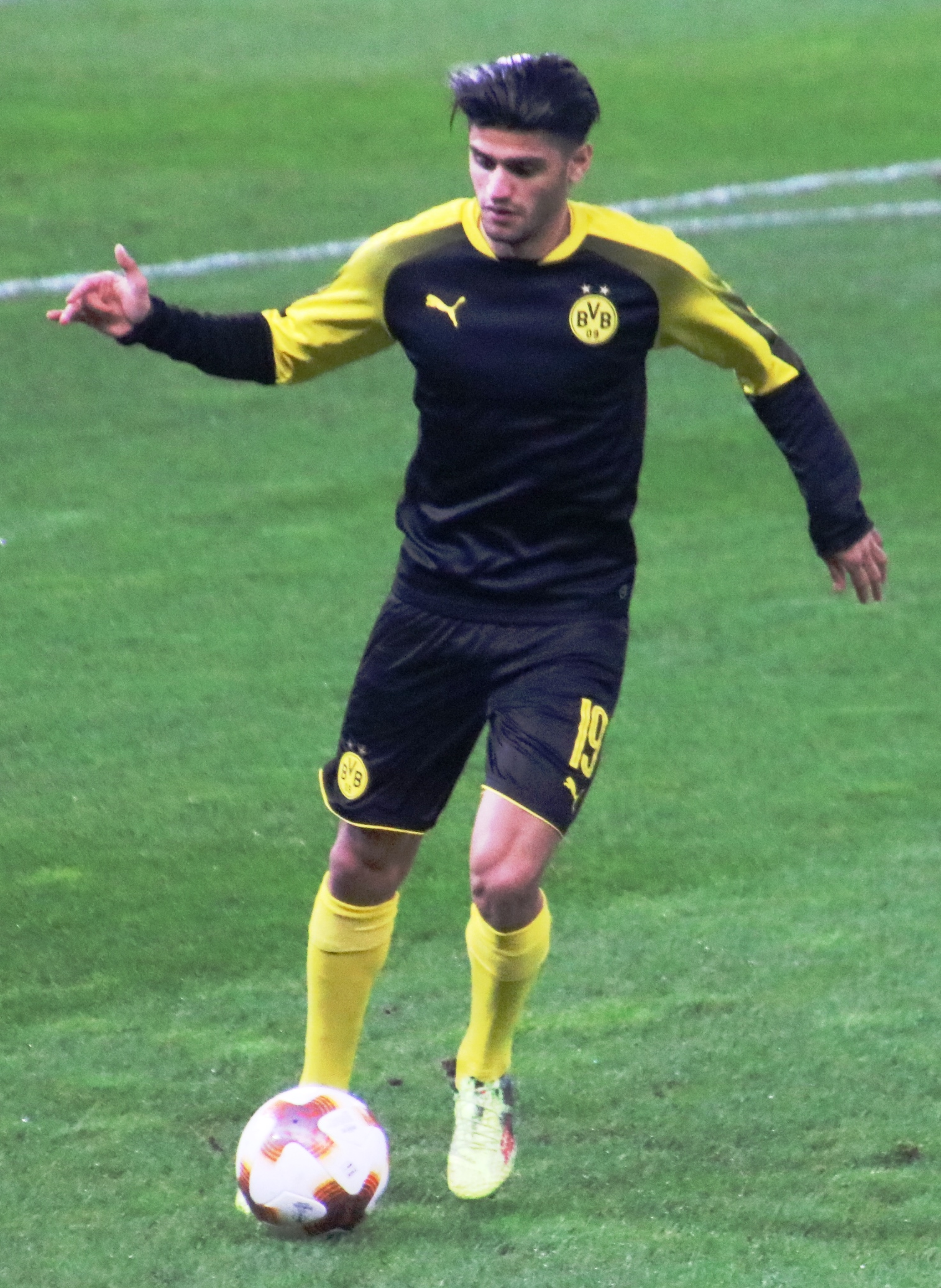
Mahmoud Dahoud (2018)

- Agit Kabayel, boxer
- Deniz Naki, football player
- Mahmoud Dahoud, football player
- Baker Barakat, boxer and kickboxer
- Deniz Undav, football player
- Mirkan Aydın, football player
- Aias Aosman, football player
- Shergo Biran, football player
- Youssef Amyn, football player
- Joan Oumari, football player
- Hassan Oumari, football player
- Dilan Ağgül, football player

== Musicians ==
=== Rappers ===
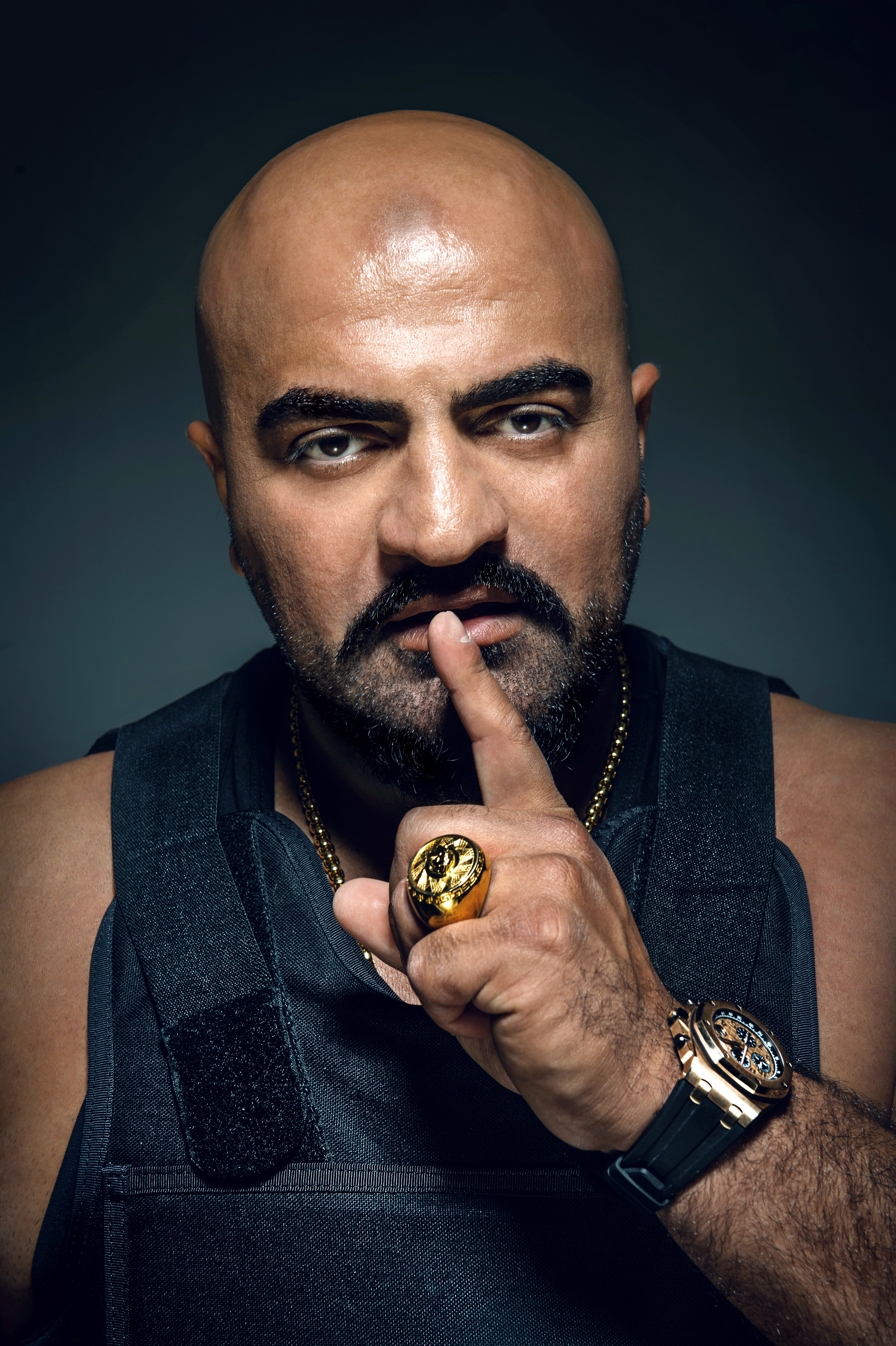
Xatar

- Haftbefehl (Kurdish father and Turkish mother)
- KC Rebell
- Eko Fresh (Kurdish mother and Turkish father)
- Azad
- Xatar
- Mudi (Kurdish father and Lebanese mother)
- Kurdo
- Eno
- Capo (Kurdish father and Turkish mother)
- AK Ausserkontrolle
- Fero47
- Bero Bass
- Pashanim

=== Singers ===
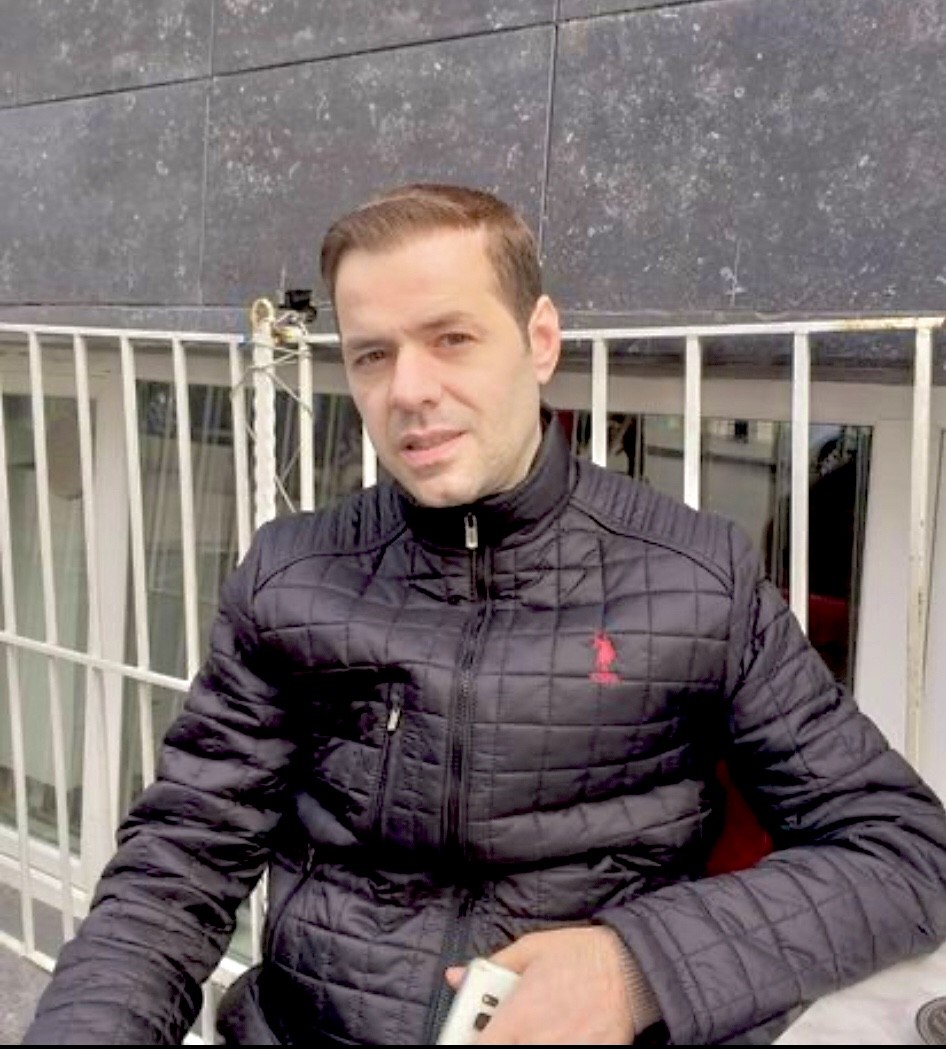
Engin Nursani

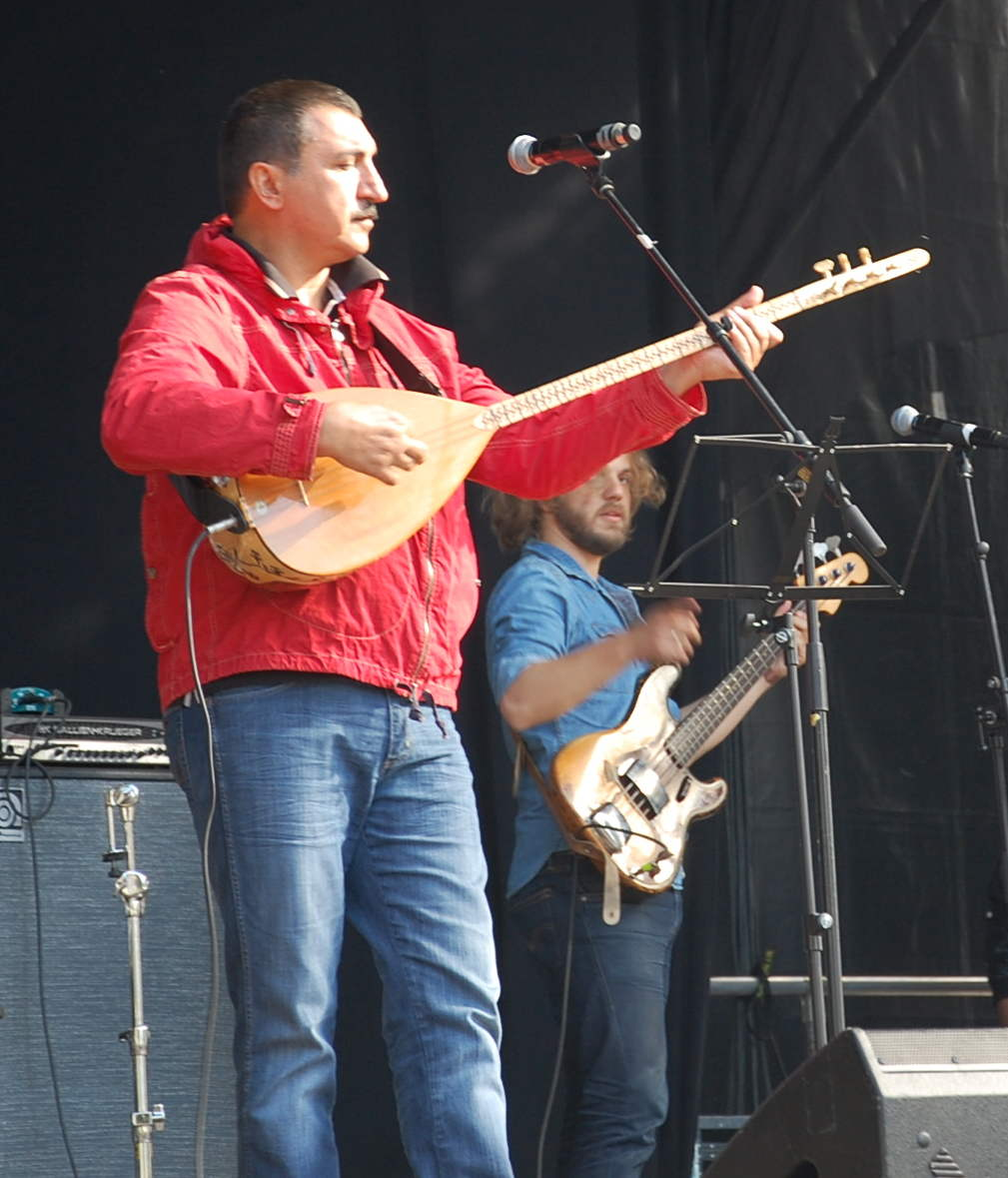
Ferhat Tunç

- Namosh
- Ferhat Tunç
- Engin Nurşani
- Nizamettin Ariç
- Ali Baran
- Hozan Canê
- Serhat Baran

=== DJs ===
- Kurd Maverick

== Politicians ==
in German parties

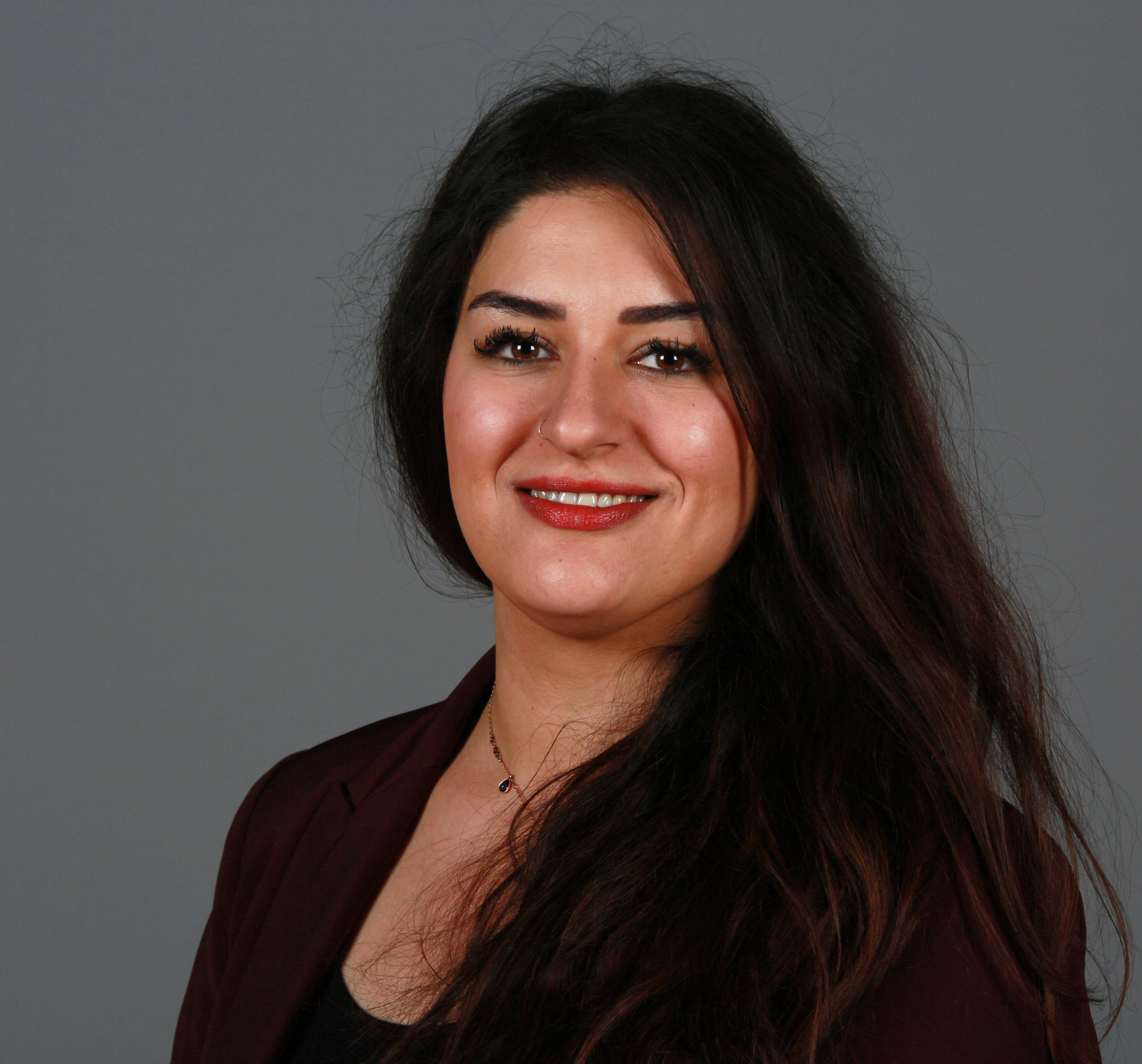
Cansu Özdemir

- Berivan Aymaz, politician
- Ferat Koçak,
- Sevim Dağdelen, German politician and a member of the Left Party (Die Linke)
- Cem Ince, German politician (The Left)
- Evrim Sommer, German politician
- Gökay Akbulut, German politician and social scientist. She is currently serving in the Bundestag (federal parliament) as a member of The Left Party from the German federal state of Baden-Württemberg
- Kassem Taher Saleh, German civil engineer and politician of the Alliance 90/The Greens
- Kenan Engin, German-Kurdish political scientist
- Leyla Güven, Kurdish Politician
- Lamiya Haji Bashar, human rights activist. She was awarded the Sakharov Prize jointly with Nadia Murad in 2016
- Ali Atalan, Kurdish-German politician of Yazidi faith. He is a former member of the Landtag of North Rhine-Westphalia with Die Linke in Germany, and the Turkish Parliament with the Peoples' Democratic Party (HDP)
- Cansu Özdemir, German politician of The Left from Hamburg. She is a member of the Hamburg Parliament
- Serdar Yüksel, German politician of SPD from Essen. He is since 2025 a member of the Bundestag
- Muhterem Aras, German politician of the Alliance 90/The Greens party. She has been a Member of the Landtag of Baden-Württemberg for the constituency Stuttgart I since May 2011, and Landtagspräsidentin (speaker) since May 2016
- Hamide Akbayir German politician
- Hüseyin Kenan Aydın, German politician and member of Die Linke.

in foreign parties or organisations

- Haji Ahmadi (Iran; grew up in Iran and lives in exile in Germany)
- Leyla İmret (grew up in Germany and lived in Turkey)
- Feleknas Uca (grew up in Germany and lives in Turkey)
- Cuneyd Zapsu

== Cinema ==
- Züli Aladağ, film director, film producer, and screenwriter (Kurdish and Turkish origin)
- Ayşe Polat, script writer and film director
- Yasemin Şamdereli, German film director, screenwriter and actress
- Düzen Tekkal, German author, television journalist, filmmaker, war correspondent, political scientist, and social entrepreneur of Kurdish–Yazidi descent
- Nizamettin Ariç, film director

== Writers and Literature ==
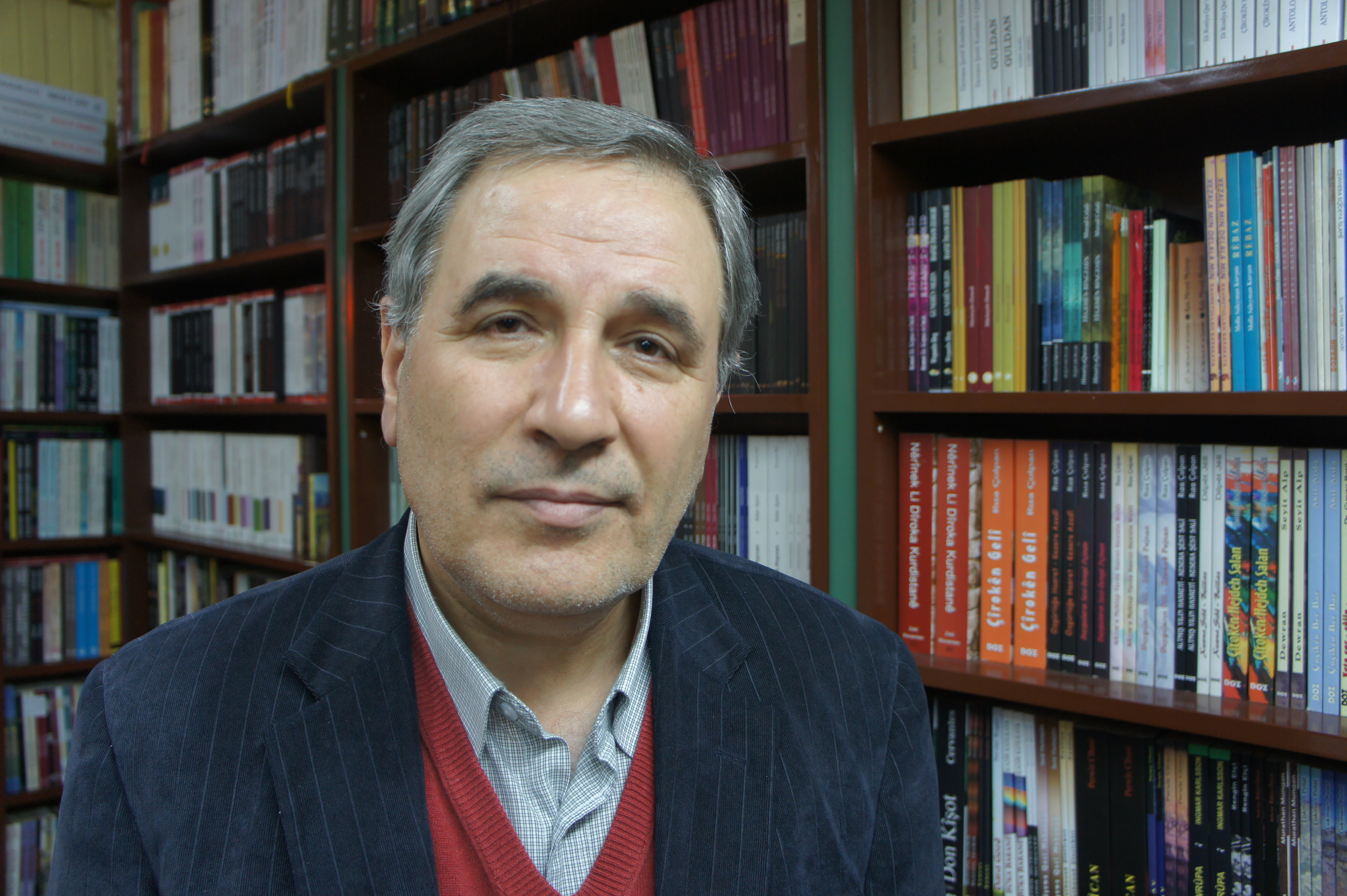
The Kurdish writer Rohat Alakom, 2010

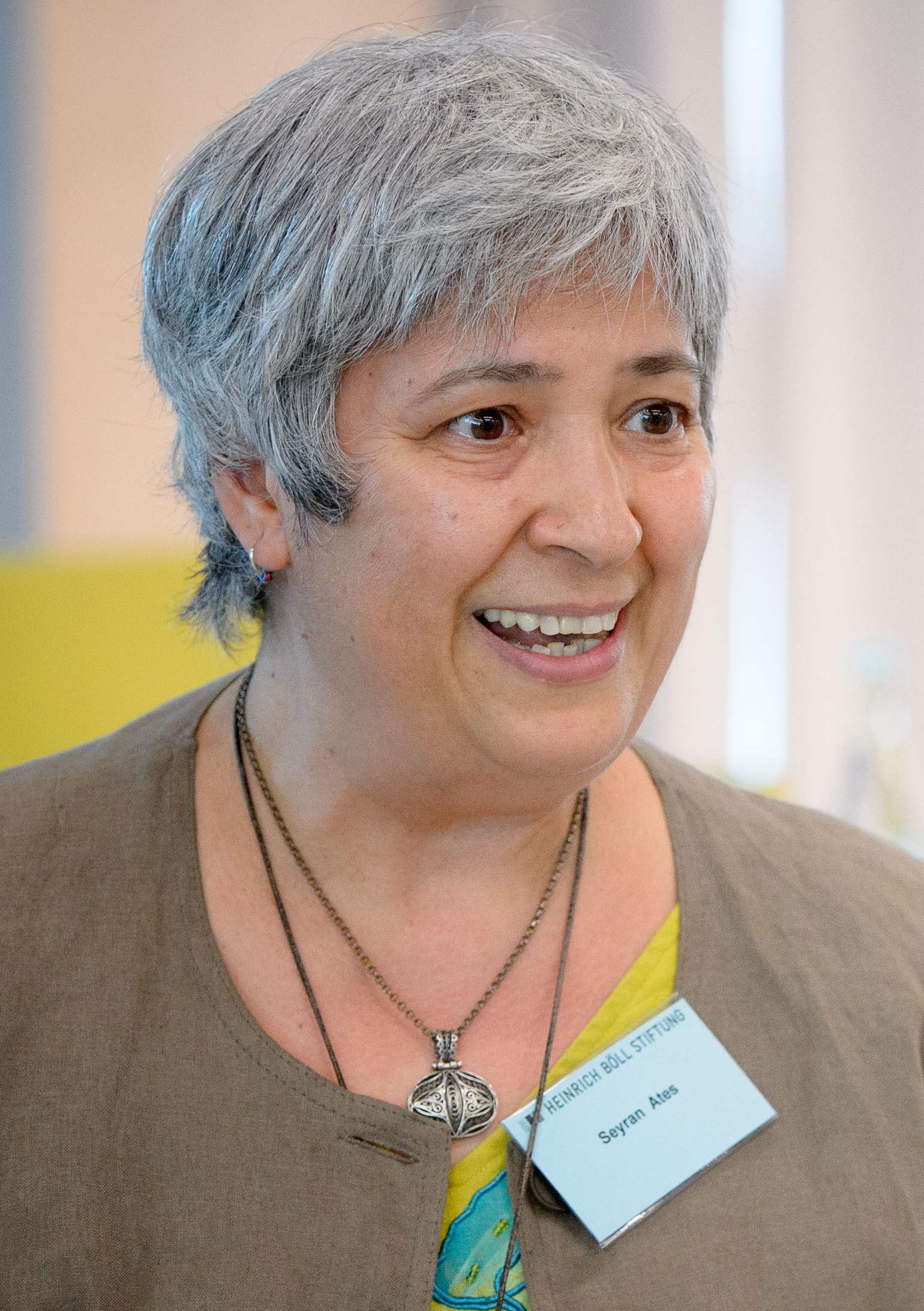
Seyran Ateş

- Seyran Ateş (Kurdish father and Turkish mother)
- Rohat Alakom
- Lamiya Haji Bashar
- Eskerê Boyîk
- Nadia Murad
- Bachtyar Ali
- Eskerê Boyîk, writer
- Khalil Rashow
- Fatma Aydemir, author and journalist
- Sherko Fatah, German writer
- Meşale Tolu, German journalist and translator

== Miscellaneous ==
- Hatun Sürücü, victim of a so-called "honor killing" by her youngest brother in 2005

== See also ==
- Kurds in Germany
- List of Kurds
- Kurdish diaspora
