= Bachtyar Ali =

Kurdish novelist and poet (born 1960)

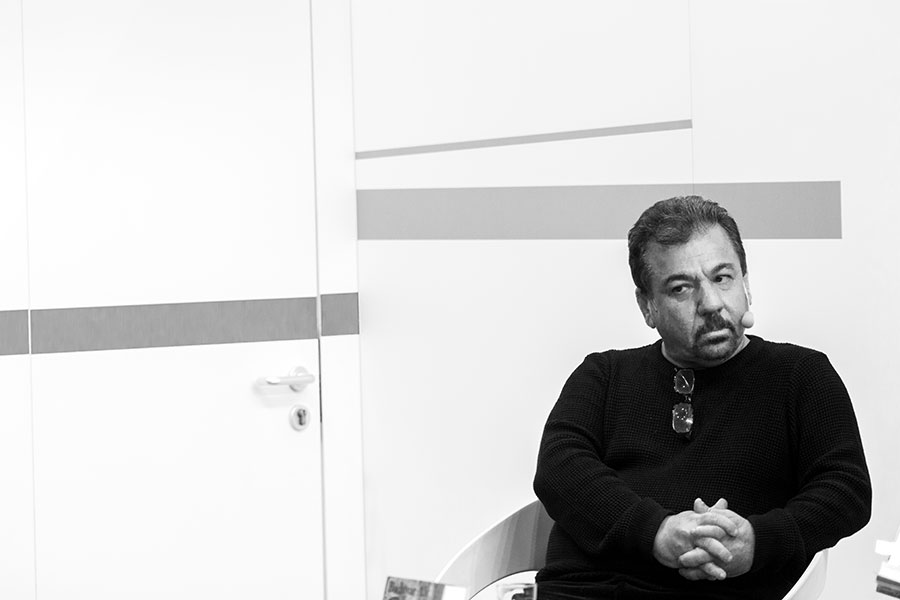
- Ali in 2017
- Pronunciation: Kurdish pronunciation: [bəxtɪː'ɑːɾ 'ʕəli]
- Born: Bachtyar Ali; 1960 (age 65–66); Sulaymaniyah, Kurdistan
- Occupations: Novelist; poet; critic
- Writing career
- Notable work: I Stared at the Night of the City
- Notable awards: HARDI Literature Prize (2009); Sherko Bekas Literature Prize (2014)
- Movements: Postmodernism, magic realism, literary fiction
- Website: www.mertin-litag.de/authors_htm/Ali_B.htm

Signature
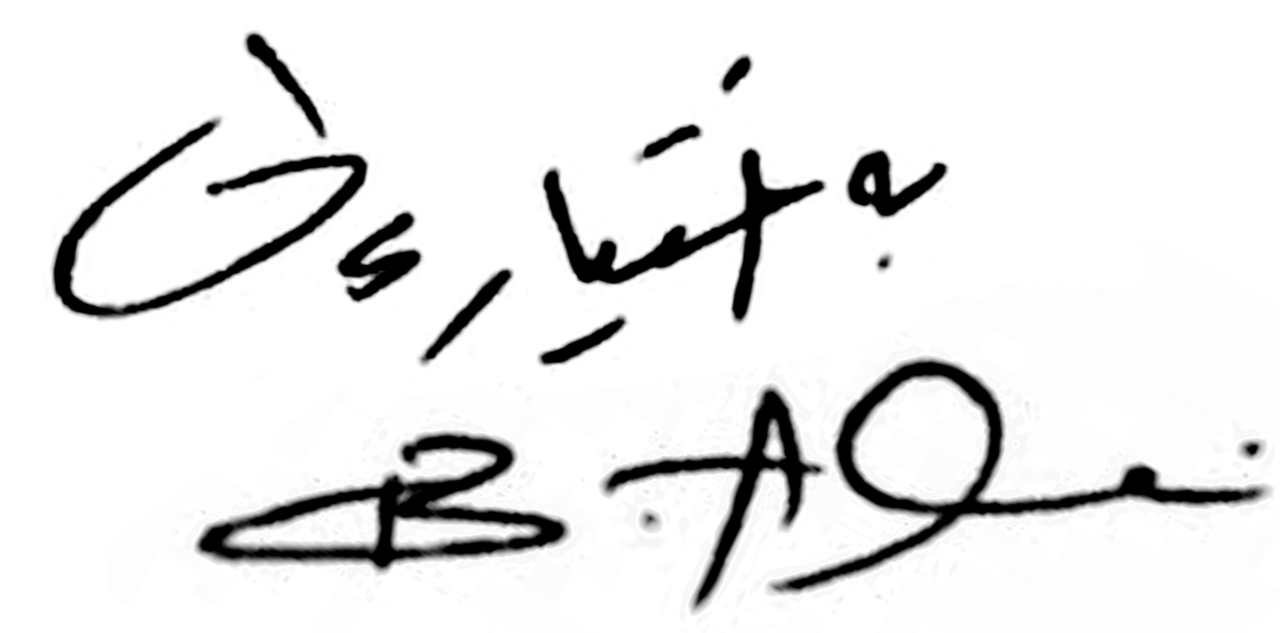

Bachtyar Ali (Note: His name is also transcribed as Bakhtiyar or Bakhtyar) (Kurdish pronunciation: [bəxtɪː'ɑːɾ 'ʕəli]; Sorani Kurdish: بەختیار عەلی, romanized: Baxtyar Alî; born 1960), is a Kurdish novelist, intellectual, literary critic, essayist, and poet. Ali started out as a poet and essayist, but has established himself as an influential novelist from the mid-1990s. He has published thirteen novels, and several collections of poetry and essays.

Since the mid-1990s, Ali has been living in Germany (Frankfurt, Cologne and most recently Bonn). In his academic essays, he has dealt with various subjects, such as the 1988 Saddam-era Anfal genocide campaign, the relationship between the power and intellectuals and other philosophical issues. He often employs western philosophical concepts to interpret an issue in Kurdish society, modifying or adapting them to his context.

In 2016 his novel Ghezelnus u Baxekani Xeyal ("Ghazalnus and the Gardens of Imagination") was published in English under the title I Stared at the Night of the City. The first Kurdish-language novel to be published in English, it was translated by London-based journalist and translator Kareem Abdulrahman. In the same year, his novel Duwahamin Henari Dunya ("The World's Last Pomegranate") was translated into German by Rawezh Salim and Ute Cantera-Lang under the title Der letzte Granatapfel ("The Last Pomegranate"); Kareem Abdulrahman translated it into English as The Last Pomegranate Tree in 2023.

== Education ==
Ali finished his pre-university education in Slemani. He attended Shaykh Salam Primary School, Azmar Secondary School and Halkawt Preparatory School. He started studying Geology at the University of Sulaimani, and later Salahaddin University in Erbil (Kurdish, Hawler: هەولێر), the current capital of Iraq's Kurdistan Region. Ali speaks Kurdish, Arabic, Persian, Turkish, German, and has a working knowledge of English.

== Writing career ==
He wrote his first prominent piece of writing in 1983, a long poem called Nishtiman ("The Homeland"; Kurdish; نیشتمان). His first article, titled La parawezi bedangi da ("In the margin of silence") in the Pashkoy, Iraq newspaper in 1989. He started to publish and hold seminars after the 1991 uprising against the Iraqi government, as the Kurds started to establish a de facto semi-autonomous region in parts of Iraqi Kurdistan and enjoy a degree of freedom of speech. He could not have published most of his work before 1991 because of strict political censorship under Saddam.

Along with several other writers of his generation—most notably Mariwan Wirya Qani, Rebin Hardi and Sherzad Hasan—he started a new intellectual movement in Kurdistan, mainly through holding seminars. The same group in 1991 started publishing a philosophical journal, Azadi ("Freedom"; Kurdish:ئازادی), of which only five issues were published, and then Rahand ("Dimension"; Kurdish:رەهەند).

In 1992, he published his first book, a poetry collection titled Gunah w Karnaval ("Sin and the Carnival"; Kurdish:گوناه و کەڕنەڤال). It contained several long poems, some which were written in the late 1980s. His first novel, Margi Taqanay Dwam ("The death of the second only child"; Kurdish:مەرگی تاقانەی دووەم), the first draft of which was written in the late 1980s, was published in 1997.

In 2017, he received the Nelly-Sachs-Preis award, which is only given every other year. It was the first time that the prize was awarded to an author publishing in a non-European language.

== Bibliography ==
=== Novels ===
His novels can be categorized as magic realism.

- Mergî Taqaney Diwem (The Death of the Second Only Child), 1997.
- Êwarey Perwane (Parwana's Evening), 1998.
- Diwahemîn Henary Dûnya (The Last Pomegranate Tree), 2002.
- Şary Mosîqare Spiyekan (The City of the White Musicians), 2006.
- Xezelnûs û Baxekanî Xeyal (Ghazalnus and the Gardens of Imagination), 2008.
- Koşkî Balinde Xemgînekan (The Mansion of the Sad Birds), 2009.
- Cemşîd Xany Mamim: Ke Hemîşe Ba Legel Xoyda Deybird (My Uncle Jamshid Khan : Whom the Wind was Always Taking), 2010.
- Keştî Firiştekan – Kiteby Yekem (The Angels' Ship – Book One), 2012.
- Keştî Firiştekan – Kiteby Diwem (The Angels' Ship – Book Two), 2013.
- Hewrekanî Danial (Danial's Clouds), 2015.
- Keşti Firiştekan – Kiteby Sêyem (The Angels' Ship – Book Three), 2017.
- Deryas û Laşekan (Daryas and the Bodies), 2019
- Dagîrkirdinî tarîkî (Conquest in the Dark) 2020
- Bender Feylî 2022
- Nefretî Newbeharan 2024

=== Essays ===
- Îman û Cengaweranî (Faith and its Warriors), 2004.
- Sêwî Sêhem (Third Apple), 2009.
- Çêjî Merigdostî (The Taste of Mournfluness), 2011.
- Le Diyarewe bo Nadiyar (From Visible to Invisible), 2011.
- Wek Balindey naw Cengele Tirsinakekan (Like the Birds in the Scary Jungles), 2012.
- Awrekey Orfîûos (Orpheus's Turn), 2014.
- Nersîsî Kûjraw (Murdered Narcissus), 2015.
- Rexne le 'Eqlî Faşîsty (Criticizing Fascistic Minds), 2015.
- Ciwaniyekany Nareky (The Beauties of Irregularity), 2015.
- Yadewery û Zemen (Memory and Time), 2015
- Naşwên (Nowhere), 2019.
- Aydolojîst (Ideologist), 2019.
- Opozisîon û Portirêtekany (Opposition and its Portraits), 2019.
- Diwa Xendey Dîktator (The Last Smile of Dictator), 2020.

=== Poetry ===
- Ta Matemî gûl... Ta Xwênî Firişte ('Till the Funeral of Flower... 'Till the Angel's Blood); Complete works (1983–2004).
- Ey Benderî Dost, Ey Keştî Dûjmin (O the Port of Friend, O the Ship of Enemy), 2009.
- Şewêk Asman pir bû le Estêrey Şêt (A Night the Sky was Full of Crazy Stars), 2019.

== See also ==
- Mariwan Kanie
- Sara Omar
- Nalî
- Mahwi
- Piramerd
- Muhamed Amin Zaki
- Abdulla Goran
- Jamal Nebez
- Sherko Bekas
- Rafiq Hilmi
- Latif Halmat
- Mohammad Hanif (Iranian writer)
