= Gerechtigkeitsbrunnen =

Gerechtigkeitsbrunnen means "fountain of justice" in German and may refer to:

- Gerechtigkeitsbrunnen (Bern), a 1543 fountain in Berne, Switzerland
- Gerechtigkeitsbrunnen (Aarau), a 1634 fountain in Aarau, Switzerland
- Gerechtigkeitsbrunnen (Biel), a 1534 fountain in Biel/Bienne, Switzerland
- Gerechtigkeitsbrunnen (Burgdorf), a 1541 fountain in Switzerland
- Gerechtigkeitsbrunnen (Frankfurt), a 1541 fountain in Frankfurt, Germany; see Lady Justice § Sculpture
- Gerechtigkeitsbrunnen (Worms), a 1778 fountain in Worms, Germany
- Gerechtigkeitsbrunnen (Wuppertal), a 1910 fountain in Wuppertal, Germany, rebuilt by Shwan Kamal
