= Hamide =

Hamide is the feminine given name version of the name Hamid. It may refer to:

== Hamide ==
- Hamide Akbayir (born 1959), German politician of Turkish descent
- Hamide Ayşe Sultan (1887–1960), Ottoman princess, daughter of Sultan Abdul Hamid II
- Hamide Bıkçın (born 1978), Turkish Taekwondo practitioner
- Hamide Doğangün (born 1993), Turkish Paralympian athlete

== Hamideh ==
- Hamideh Abbasali (born 1990), Iranian karateka
- Hamideh Kheirabadi (1924–2010), Iranian film and theater actress
