= I Stared at the Night of the City =

Kurdish novel by Bachtyar Ali

- Author: Bachtyar Ali; (Also spelt Bakhtiyar Ali in English)
- Original title: Ghazalnus w Baghakani Khayal - غەزەلنوس و باغەکانی خەیاڵ
- Translator: Kareem Abdulrahman
- Cover artist: James Nunn
- Language: Kurdish
- Genre: Literary fiction, Magical realism
- Publisher: Periscope, imprint of Garnet Publishing, UK
- Publication date: 2008
- Publication place: Iraq
- English publication date: 2016
- Media type: Print (Paperback)
- Pages: 612 pp. (original Kurdish) 545 pp (1st English ed.)

I Stared at the Night of the City is a Kurdish novel by writer Bachtyar Ali (usually spelt Bakhtiyar Ali in English) translated into English by Kareem Abdulrahman in 2016. Set at the turn of the 21st century in Iraqi Kurdistan, the multi-narrator novel explores the relationship between an emerging political elite and intellectuals in contemporary Iraqi Kurdistan, portraying the Kurdish authorities' increasing authoritarian tendencies. It is the first Kurdish novel to be translated into English.

The novel became a best-seller in Iraqi Kurdistan in 2008. It was published in Kurdish under the title of Ghazalnus w Baghakani Khayal غەزەلنوس و باغەکانی خەیاڵ.

== Outline ==
The lead character in the novel is a poet, Ghazalnus, whose outlook is in stark contrast with that of a powerful politician, nicknamed the Baron of Imagination. The Baron has his own scheme, to construct a beautiful district, “a mini-paradise”, and he approaches the town's poets and intellectuals to help him with the design of the project. This is a satirical reference to the Kurdish authorities’ liking for extravagant schemes, such as high-security residential areas and hotels, on which they spend public money, while failing to address essential political and social problems. Yet, he opposes the idea of artists and writers exploring taboo subjects - such as unresolved murders and corruption.

In the multi-layered novel, a group of like-minded friends, led by a poet, go on an odyssey to find the bodies of two lovers killed by the authorities. The plot features elements of fantasy: the poet discovers a land that turns into an infinite garden at night, a group of women living in a shelter to escape domestic violence weave the world's biggest carpet, and a Hollywood film buff leads a group of blind children on an imaginary sea journey.

Each chapter of the novel has a different narrator, and usually there are thematic and chronological connections between chapters.

== Characters ==
Many of the characters in this novel and other works by Ali have significant names. Here, many of them have more than one name:

- Ghazalnus, (literally "writer of ghazals"); also referred to as Bahman Nasser; poet; he represents intellectuals who don't yield to the pressures of money or intimidation.
- The Baron of Imagination; a powerful politician who sees intellectuals as a threat and tries to win them over by carrot or stick.
- Hassan-i Tofan, also known as Hassan-i Pizo; former assassin and member of Kurdish armed movement against the Saddam regime. He denounces his violent past after he joins Ghazalnus's inner circle.
- Trifa Yabahri, another member of Ghazalnus's inner circle, and the most prominent female character in the book; an imaginative woman who helps women at a shelter weave carpets.
- Majid-i Gul Solav, also known as the Imaginary Magellan; another member of Ghazalnus's group; a young film buff who has never left his hometown but embarks on imaginary journeys.

== Media ==
Slate website's Joshua Keating wrote an article about the book, mainly focusing on the challenges facing translating Kurdish books into English. On September 5, Sarhang Hars published a news article on NRT English (Later re-published by E-Kurd Daily and became a source for two other reports which included interviews with both Bakhtyar Ali and Kareem Abdulraman. In the report, both the author and the translator expressed concern on the state of Kurdish literary translations.

== Translator ==
This is Kareem Abdulrahman's first book-length translation into English. He worked for over eight years with the BBC. In 2013, he was awarded a place on the British Centre for Literary Translation's prestigious translation mentorship programme.
