= Cem Ince =

German politician (born 1993)

Member of the Bundestag
- Incumbent
- Assumed office 2025
- Constituency: Lower Saxony

Personal details
- Born: 9 December 1993 (age 32) Salzgitter, Germany
- Party: The Left

Cem Hamit Ince (born 9 December 1993) is a German politician and member of the Bundestag. A member of The Left, he has represented Lower Saxony since 2025.

Ince was born on 9 December 1993 in Salzgitter and is of Kurdish origin. His grandfather moved from Eastern Anatolia to Salzgitter in the late 1960s as a guest worker and worked in the blast furnaces of Salzgitter AG. Ince's father also did his apprenticeship and worked at Salzgitter AG before moving to the Volkswagen factory in Salzgitter. His grandfather and father were also trade unionists.

Ince graduated from Kranich-Gymnasium Salzgitter in 2012 and then trained to be electronics technician at VW Salzgitter from 2012 to 2015. He also studied business administration and software development at VW Salzgitter. He is an IG Metall member and has been a shop steward at VW Salzgitter since 2012. He was the youth and trainee representative at VW Salzgitter from 2014 to 2016 and the chair youth and trainee representative from 2016 to 2020. He has been a member of the IG Metall shop steward council at VW Salzgitter since 2022.

Ince has been chairman of The Left's branch in Salzgitter since 2021. He was The Left's candidate in Salzgitter – Wolfenbüttel (constituency 49) at the 2025 federal election but was not elected. He was however elected to the Bundestag on The Left's state list in Lower Saxony.
