= Cansu Özdemir =

German politician (born 1988)

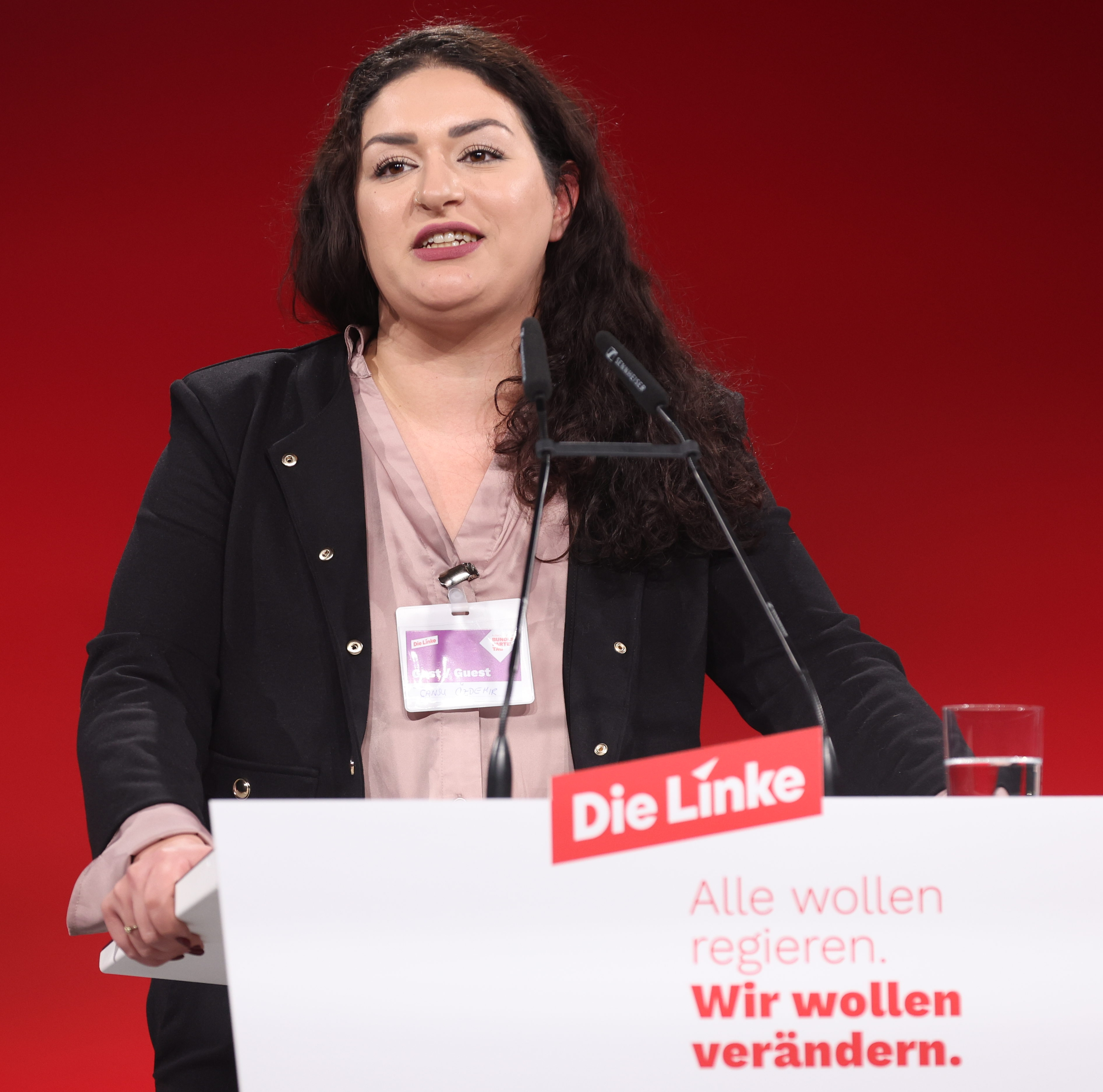
- Özdemir in 2025

Member of the Bundestag for Hamburg
- Incumbent
- Assumed office 23 February 2025
- Constituency: The Left Party List

Member of the Hamburg Parliament
- In office 20 February 2011 – 23 February 2025
- Constituency: Hamburg-Altona

Personal details
- Born: 8 September 1988 (age 38) Hamburg, West Germany
- Party: The Left (since 2009)
- Children: 1
- Education: University of Hamburg

Cansu Özdemir (born 8 September 1988) is a German politician of The Left from Hamburg. She is a member of the Bundestag.

== Life ==
Özdemir was born in Hamburg to Kurdish parents in 1988. After she received her Abitur from Kieler Straße Business School in 2009, she studied cultural anthropology and politics at the University of Hamburg.

== Political career ==
In 2009, Özdemir also became a member of The Left and in 2011 she entered the Hamburg Parliament of which she has been a member ever since. Özdemir led The Left in the 2020 Hamburg state election.

She is known for her support for the legalization of the Kurdistan Workers' Party, which is banned in Germany. Özdemir is also a strong critic of the Turkish president Recep Tayyip Erdoğan, and the foreign policy of Germany regarding Turkey. She called Erdoğan a "dictator" in an interview, and is also critical of the Syrian civil war.

In the 2021 German federal election, she unsuccessfully contested the constituency of Hamburg-Altona. In the 2025 German federal election, she was placed second on her party's state list for Hamburg and was elected to the Bundestag.
