= Mariwan Kanie =

Kurdish intellectual, writer and political scientist (born 1966)

Mariwan Wrya Kanie (Kurdish: مەریوان قانع, born 1966, Sulaymaniyah, Iraqi Kurdistan) is a Kurdish intellectual, writer, and political scientist. Since 1993 he lives and works in the Netherlands. He is a lecturer on the Middle East and the Arab World at the Faculty of Humanities, the Department of Hebrew, Arabic, and Jewish studies University of Amsterdam.

Kanie fled Iraq in 1992. He studied political science at the University of Amsterdam between 1995-1997, and completed his PhD in humanities in 2010. The subject of his master thesis was Kurdish Long Distance Nationalism in the Netherlands: From Mountain People to Cyber Nation. The topic of the dissertation was the transformation of the Islamic notion of martyrdom, al-shahada, to a revolutionary secular notion within the Kurdish nationalism. The PHD thesis is titled: Martyrdom between nation and religion. Political love, poetry, and self sacrifice in Kurdish nationalism.. His field of research and expertise contain the interaction between religion, nationalism and secularization processes. He has extensive knowledge of the intellectual, political and literary history of the modern Arab World and also expert on Kurdish modern nationalism, culture, society and diaspora.

Kanie has a wide range of publications in Kurdish, English and Dutch. Some of his work has been translated in Arabic and Persian. He is also an influential public intellectual in Kurdistan and a well known author of many books and articles. His book 'Complex Identities' won the prize of the best non-fiction in 2004, this prize is issued by the Kurdish Ministry of Culture. He is one of the editorial board members of "Rahand", a Kurdish intellectual magazine. He publishes in the Kurdish newspapers Hawlati and Awena, and in January 2011 was indicted in Iraqi Kurdistan for an article in Awena that criticized president Massoud Barzani. He also regularly published in the Dutch daily newspaper Trouw and appeared on television in the news commentary programs Nova and Netwerk.

== Books ==
Mariwan Kanie published in Kurdish the following books:

- Power and Difference (2000)
- Islam, philosophy and enlightenment (2002)
- Complex Identities (2004)
- Nationalism and Migration
- Happiness and Silence
- The book of disappointment (poems)
- Religion and the world (2011)
- Book and the world
- Thinking and the world(1)
- Thinking and the world(2)
