= Gökay Akbulut =

German politician (born 1982)

Gökay Akbulut MdB
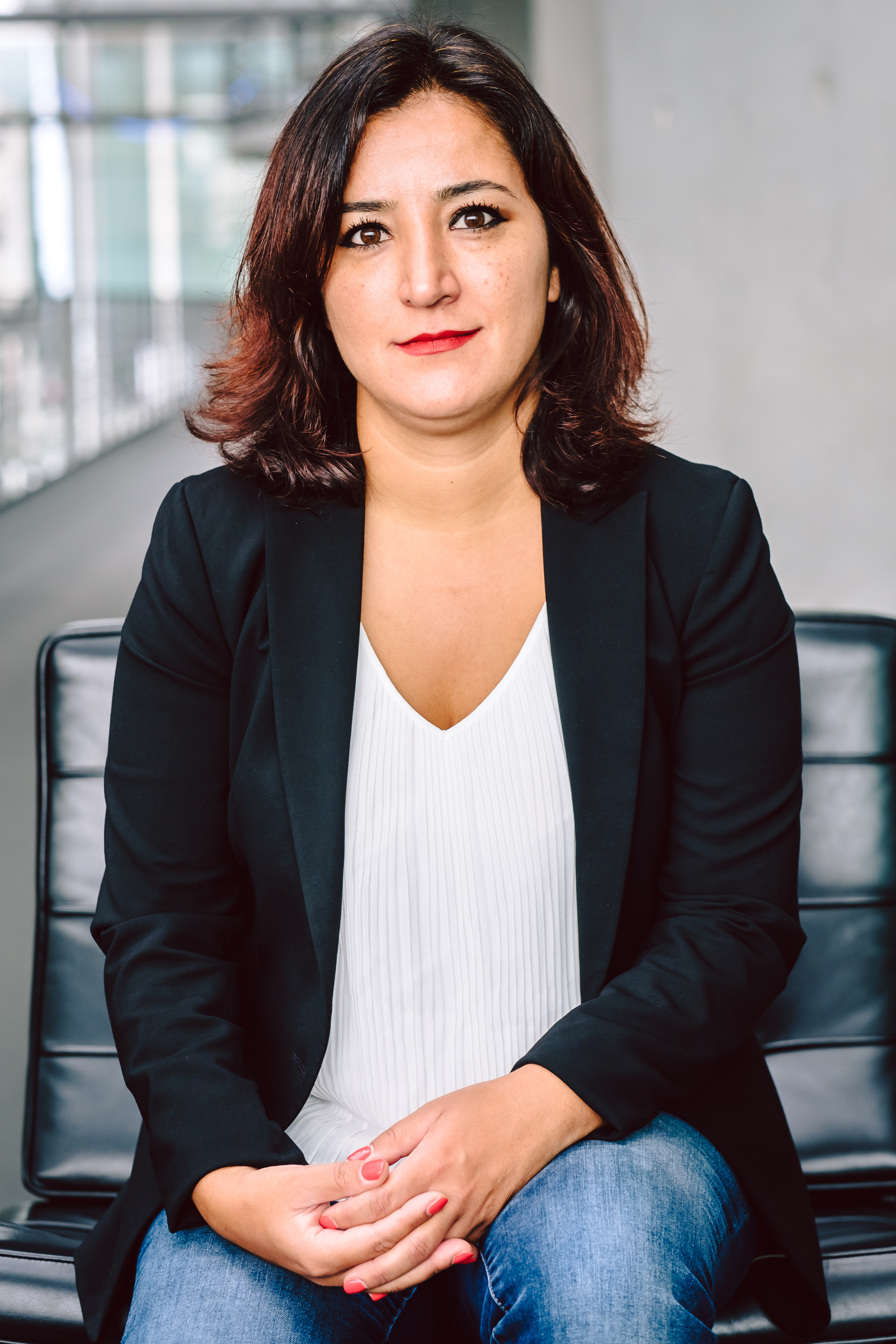
- Akbulut in 2018

Member of the Bundestag for Baden-Württemberg
- Incumbent
- Assumed office 24 October 2017
- Constituency: The Left list

Personal details
- Born: 16 November 1982 (age 43) Pınarbaşı, Turkey
- Citizenship: Germany; Turkey
- Party: Left Party (since 2007)
- Other political affiliations: Association of Students from Kurdistan (formerly)
- Education: Heidelberg University
- Occupation: Political scientist • Politician
- Website: https://goekay-akbulut.de

Gökay Akbulut (born 16 November 1982) is a Turkish-born German politician and social scientist. She is currently serving in the Bundestag (federal parliament) as a member of The Left Party from the German federal state of Baden-Württemberg.

== Early life, education and profession ==
Akbulut was born in Pinarbaşi, Turkey, into a family of Kurdish Alevi background.

After graduating from high school in Hamburg, Akbulut studied political sciences, sociology and public law at the Ruprecht-Karls-Universität in Heidelberg from October 2003 until September 2008. She graduated with a Magister.

She completed an internship at the United Nations offices in New York in 2007 as well as an internship with the members of parliament Alexander Ullrich and Heike Hänsel in Berlin. While still studying at the University, Akbulut worked as a waitress and in a call-center to finance her studies. Later she worked as an educator in the field of education with underprivileged youth and refugees. From 2012 - 2016 she was an independent lecturer at the Mannheimer Abendakademie und Volkshochschule GmbH in Mannheim. From 2016 -2017 she worked as a speaker for migration and education at the political foundation Rosa-Luxemburg-Stiftung in Baden-Württemberg, Stuttgart.

== Political engagement ==
In her youth she attended many Kurdish manifestations and got to known the solidarity of the left-wing politicians. In 2006 she worked in an office of The Left Party.

Since 2006 Akbulut is a member of The Left Party in Germany. Since 2012 she is also an active member of The Left Party Mannheim, where she served on the board of the local District association Kreisverband Mannheim. From May 2014 until June 2018, Akbulut represented the Left Party as a member of the municipal council of Mannheim (Mannheimer Gemeinderat) in the committees for education, integration and security. In 2016 she led the main election campaign as the appointed lead candidate during the local elections in the federal state of Baden-Wurttemberg. Akbulut is a member of the GEW Baden-Württemberg, the Rosa-Luxemburg Stiftung and Attac. Moreover she is committed to the work with and for refugees and serves as a member on the board of the refugees project "Mannheim sagt JA Flüchtlingshilfe" (Mannheim says yes), the network of Kurdish Academics and Cevi, the Kurdish Women's network. She was elected to the German Parliament in 2017.

== Member of Parliament ==
Akbulut ran for the first time in the 2017 federal elections on behalf of her local district association (Landesverband Mannheim) and was elected to the third place of the Landesverband Baden-Württemberg's candidate list. At the German Parliament she represents her local electoral district Mannheim and is one out of six members of parliament from the federal state of Baden-Württemberg for The Left Party. Akbulut is the spokeswoman for migration and integration on behalf of the Left faction. She is a full member of the Committee for Legal Affairs and Consumer Protection and a deputy member of the Committee for Internal Affairs. Akbulut is also a full member of the European Law Subcommittee. She represents the Left faction in the German-Turkish as well as in the German-Greek Parliamentary Group of the German Parliament. Due to years of active work in Kurdish associations and her support for the Kurdish Movement, Akbulut is well connected all over Europe. In 2017 the press reported that Akbulut was under observation of the Federal Office for the Protection of the Constitution because of her pro-Kurdish activism. She was accused of having been in contact with Kurdish organizations, who are allegedly associated with the Kurdistan Workers' Party (PKK). Akbulut is pressing charges against this observation, which supposedly started in 2007. She receives support for her legal resistance against this observation from her party The Left.

== Political views ==
During debates on the possible ratification of the Global Compact for Migration of Germany Akbulut was the leading voice in the support of the Compact's ratification by Germany, opposing the position of faction chairwoman Sahra Wagenknecht. Akbulut expressed criticism against Wagenknecht's controversial statements on the topics of migration and her engagement for her private campaign Aufstehen.

She is critical of the current political order in Germany and would like to see broader democratic possibilities. She'd prefer the economy would have to adapt more to the democracy instead that the democracy adapts to according to the economy. She is an opponent of the Turkish Government of Recep Tayyip Erdoğan.
