= Sevim Dağdelen =

German politician (born 1975)

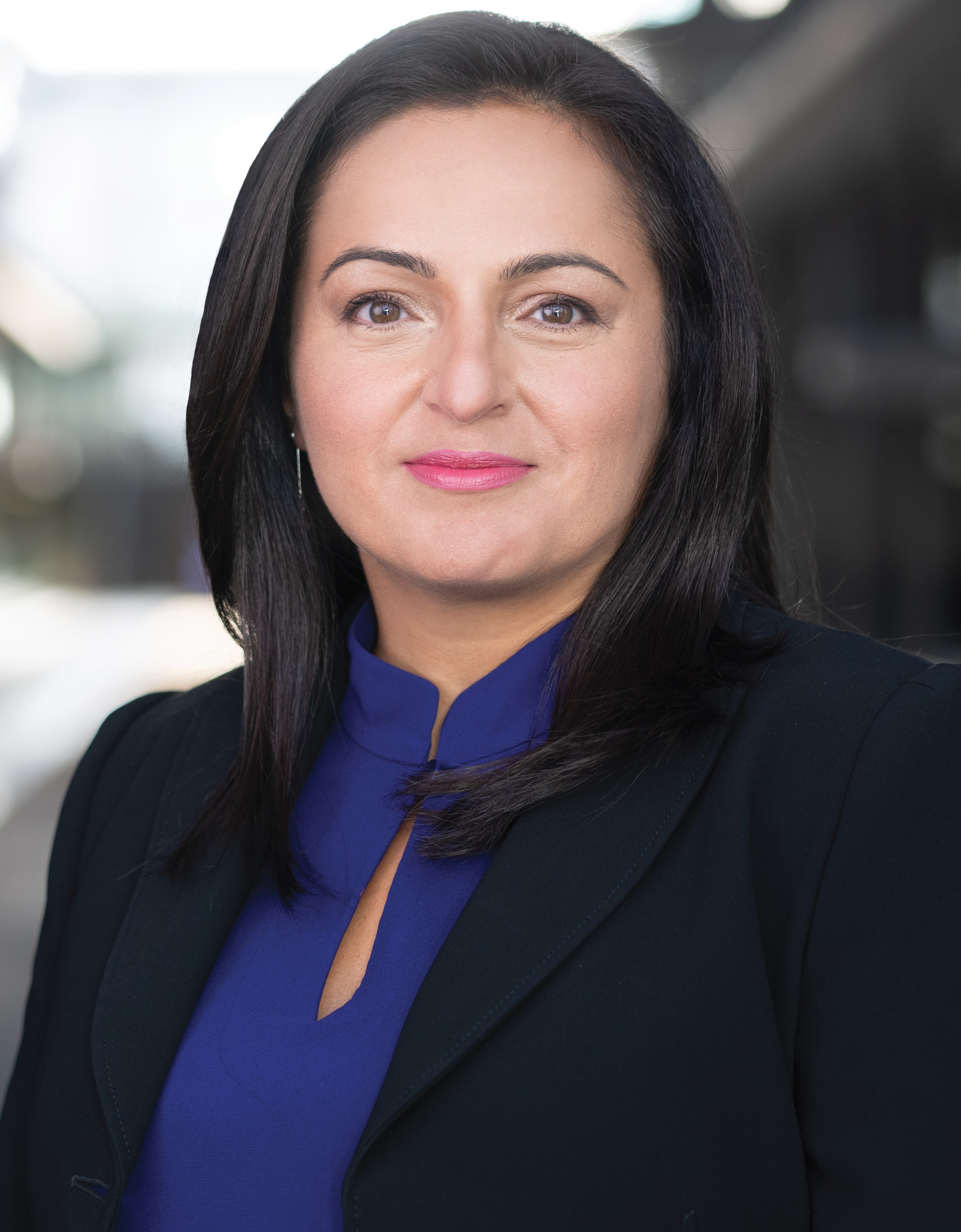

Member of the Bundestag for North Rhine-Westphalia
- In office 18 October 2005 – 23 February 2025
- Constituency: Left Party List

Personal details
- Born: 4 September 1975 (age 51) Duisburg, Germany
- Party: Bündnis Sahra Wagenknecht (since 2023)
- Other political affiliations: The Left (until 2023)
- Education: University of Marburg; University of Adelaide
- Website: sevimdagdelen.de

Sevim Dağdelen (born 4 September 1975) is a German politician and was from 2005 to 2025 a member of the German parliament, the Bundestag. She was elected for Left Party (die Linke) and switched in October 2023 to Bündnis Sahra Wagenknecht.

== Early years ==
Born in Duisburg to Kurdish Alevi immigrants from Erzincan, Sevim Dağdelen finished high school in 1997. She studied law at the University of Marburg and then at the University of Adelaide, Australia for a year. She later attended the University of Cologne but did not complete her law studies. She dropped out to pursue her political career.

She worked for the left-wing Turkish newspaper Evrensel and German publications Tatsachen and Junge Stimme and has continued membership in the worker unions.

== Career ==
After joining the Left Party, Dağdelen became a member of the regional-level party council of North Rhine-Westphalia and the federal student agency from 1996 to 1998. From 1993 to 2001, she was a member of the federal youth commission. From 2005 to 2025, she was a member of the German Bundestag.

Dağdelen participated in the State dinner with Angela Merkel at the White House in June 2011.

Dağdelen visited Julian Assange at the Embassy of Ecuador in the United Kingdom in September 2012, passing on to him "solidarity ... from the left in Germany and the online community in Germany".

She was re-elected into the Bundestag for the fifth time following the 2021 German federal election.

She is known to be a supporter of the Kurdish People's Protection Units (YPG). She showed the flag of the YPG in the Bundestag, which is forbidden in Germany. She also opposes the German foreign policy regarding Turkey, which attacked the YPG in Afrin. Because of her stance on the YPG, her appearance at a regional IG Metall congress in 2018 led to controversy. Some Turkish Germans started a social media campaign to end their membership in the workers' union.

When Sahra Wagenknecht presented her new party, BSW, during a press conference on 23 October 2023. Dağdelen is one of the MPs who left The Left and joined Wagenknecht's party.

Dağdelen published a new book, titled NATO: A Reckoning with the Atlantic Alliance, in July 2024, discussing it with Amy Goodman of Democracy Now! on 10 July.

In the 2025 federal election, she stood as a direct candidate in the Berlin-Mitte constituency. Dağdelen lost re-election, receiving 5% of the vote. She ran on the BSW state list for the 2026 Berlin state election. Because BSW failed to reach the 5% threshold, no BSW candidate was elected.

== Political positions ==
In February 2022, Dağdelen said Russia had no interest in an invasion of Ukraine and was concerned with its legitimate security interests. She also called for a neutral status for Ukraine. On 18 February 2022, she appeared at a demonstration in Berlin with the slogan "Security for Russia is security for our country". She accused the German media of spreading the "tall tales of the U.S. intelligence service". After the Russian invasion occurred, Dağdelen was among the co-signers of a statement attributing significant responsibility for the Russian invasion to the United States. In April 2022, she praised German protesters who opposed an increase in German military spending, and she described it as "madness" to deliver military weapons to Ukraine.

Dağdelen criticized European Union commission president Ursula von der Leyen's speech in early 2023 that called for a new EU policy towards China, saying that "the EU and its member states want to challenge the emerging power China, including military means."

== Published works ==
- NATO: A Reckoning with the Atlantic Alliance (2024)

== See also ==
- Kurds in Germany
