= Kurds in Germany =

Ethnic group in Germany

Kurdên Almanyayê

Total population
- Over 1,000,000 (Kurdish Institute of Paris)

Languages
- Mostly: Kurdish · German; Others: Turkish; Persian; Arabic

Religion
- Islam · Yazidism (minority)

Related ethnic groups
- Other Iranic peoples

Kurds in Germany, or German Kurds (German: Kurden in Deutschland or Deutschkurden; Kurdish: Kurdên Almanyayê), are residents or citizens of Germany of full or partial Kurdish origin. There is a large Kurdish community in Germany. The number of Kurds living in Germany is unknown. Many estimates assume that the number is in the million range. In February 2000, the Federal Government of Germany (Die Bundesregierung) estimated that approximately 500,000 Kurds lived in Germany at that time.

== Immigration history of Kurds in Germany ==
=== 1919 & 1920s ===
The first Kurds migrated to Imperial Germany in 1919 and the years following, most came for diplomatic reasons related to the Ottoman Empire and later Turkey.

=== 1961-1973 (First wave) ===
The first wave of Kurdish immigrant workers from Turkey arrived after Germany and Turkey signed an economic treaty which allowed Turkish citizens (mostly men) to immigrate to West Germany as Gastarbeiter (English: "guest workers") in October 1961. This immigration officially stopped in 1973. By then, the number of immigrants had reached 867,000 (1.5 million in 1980 and 2.1 million in 1998). The percentage of Kurds in this immigrant diaspora is unknown but is speculated to be in the high hundreds of thousands.

=== 1980-2003 (Second wave) ===
The oppression of Kurds in the 1980s under the then-newly formed Islamic republic of Iran and the then following Iran–Iraq War (1980–1988) kickstarted the second wave of Kurdish migration to Germany and other countries. This second wave only increased in scale after the Gulf War (1990–1991) and later invasion of Iraq by the United States (2003).

=== 2011-2025 (Third wave) ===
During the Syrian Civil War, many of the Syrian refugees who came to Germany were Kurds. The War against ISIL also created a wave of immigrants from Iraq and Kurdistan Region.

== Impact of Kurdish immigration to Germany ==
=== Integration of Kurdish immigrants to Germany ===
According to the Bundesamt für Migration und Flüchtlinge (BAMF) (English: "Federal Office for Migration and Refugees") most Germans with ancestry going back to Turkey (thus including Kurds from Turkey) speak fluent German. Notably, gender roles in second generation immigrants resemble that of native Germans (i.e women are seen as equal). Overall the "BAMF" concludes that immigrants with German citizenship are more integrated in German society than those without.

== Religion of Kurds in Germany ==
=== Islam ===
==== Sunnism ====
Most Kurdish immigrants in Germany follow the Sunni branch of Islam, who are often from Iraq, Syria, and Turkey. Around 40 mosques in Germany are part of the umbrella association Islamische Gesellschaft Kurdistans (English: "Islamic society of Kurdistan"; Kurdish: Civaka Îslamiya Kurdistan (CÎK)).

===== Alevism =====
The number of Alevis in Germany is between 450,000 and 800,000 (mostly from Turkey), a high percentage of which are Kurds.

=== Yazidism ===
According to the German public-broadcasting radio station Deutschlandfunk, 190,000 Yazidis lived in Germany in 2018. 7,000 live in Celle and 1,300 in Oldenburg.

== Cities ==
German Kurds live spread throughout Germany, especially in cities with a large proportion of Turkish people. Examples are Berlin, Hamburg, Munich, Frankfurt, Stuttgart, Hannover, Kiel, and Essen.

== Political representation ==
There have been several politicians in German political parties with a Kurdish origin and who also openly demand an embetterment of the situation for the Kurds. Prominent names are the Members of the Bundestag Gökay Akbulut, Evrim Sommer, and Sevim Dagdelen, all members of the Die Linke. Muhterem Aras of the Green Party is the president of the State legislature of Baden-Württemberg.

=== Political activism ===
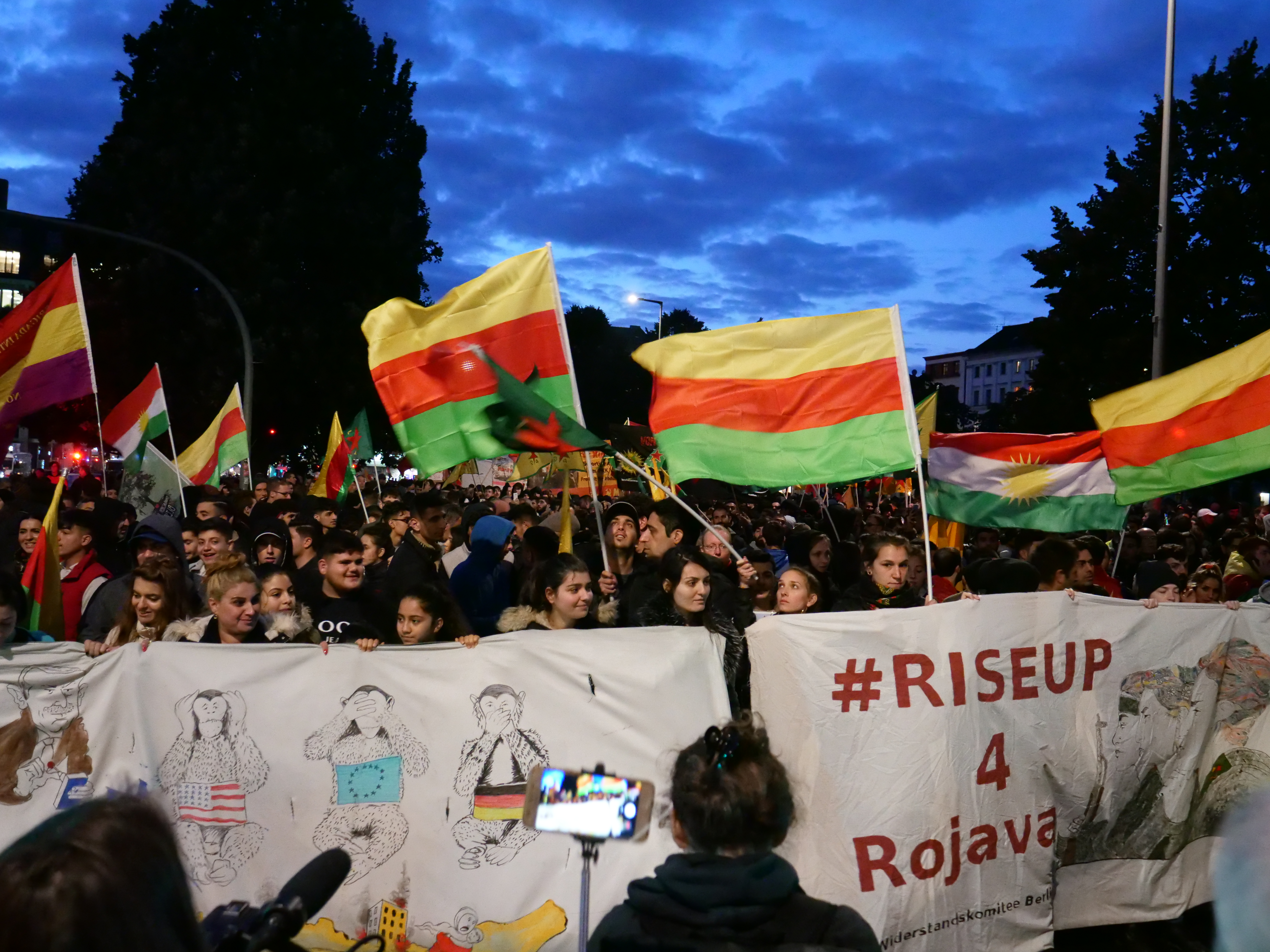
Protest against Turkey's military offensive into north-eastern Syria on 10 October 2019

In 2014, Kurds in Germany marched in protest over the siege of Kobani by ISIL.

In 2015, thousands of Kurds in Germany marched against Turkish Air Force air strikes on Kurdish civilians.

In October 2019, thousands of German Kurds protested against the 2019 Turkish offensive into north-eastern Syria.

In November 2023, around 4.100 people (mostly Germans of Kurdish origin) protested against the ban of the Kurdistan Workers' Party (PKK) and against the politics of Recep Tayyip Erdoğan.

In January 2026, thousands of Kurds in Germany demonstrated against the Syrian transitional government’s offensive targeting Kurdish-controlled regions in northeastern Syria.

== Gangs ==
According to the German authorities tin 2013. The Swiss newspapers Blick and Neue Zürcher Zeitung claimed that the Kurdish gang/motorcycle club "Sondame", allegedly "fighting" for a free Kurdistan, was formed in Stuttgart, and in 2015, it had about 1,000 members in Germany and Switzerland. The group is not well known and its existence is controversial. Other Kurdish motorcycle club and gangs include Median Empire and Red Legion.

== Women's rights ==
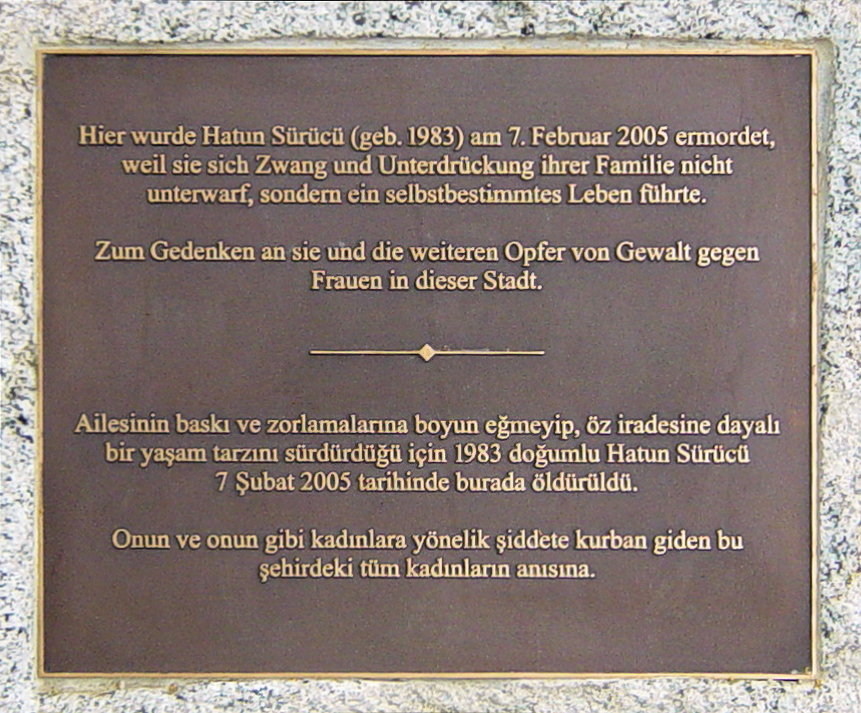
Memorial plaque for Hatun Sürücü in Berlin, Germany. The Kurdish woman from Turkey was murdered aged 23 by her brothers in an honour killing.

Some cases of honour killing have been reported among the Kurdish diaspora in Germany. In March 2009, a Kurdish immigrant from Turkey, Gülsüm S., was killed for a relationship not in keeping with her family's plan for an arranged marriage. In 2016 a Kurdish woman was shot dead at her wedding in Hannover after refusing to marry her cousin.

== Notable people ==
See List of German people of Kurdish descent

== See also ==
- Immigration to Germany
- Yazidis in Germany
- Honor killing of Hatun Sürücü
- Germany–Kurdistan Region relations
