= Bero Bass =

German rapper of Kurdish descent

- Born: Bernas Avşar; 23 July 1980 (age 45); Diyarbakır, Turkey
- Origin: Cologne, West Germany
- Genres: German hip hop
- Occupation: Rapper
- Years active: 2007–present
- Labels: La Honda Evangelium
- Website: berobass.de

Bernas Avşar (born 23 July 1980), known professionally as Bero Bass, is a German rapper of Kurdish origin based in Cologne.

== Biography ==
In July 2009, Avşar was imprisoned after furiously attacking a 26-year-old male with a knife. He was awaiting his trial in prison before being released on bail in December 2009.

While he was in jail, his long-time friend OJ Kingpin, with whom he performed by the name La Honda as a rap duo, left the rap business, claiming gangster rap has no future and that they never earned any money from rapping.

Bero Bass passionely raps about Kurdistan in nearly all of his tracks, always saying 'Biji Kurdistan' (translating to Long Live Kurdistan) or waving Kurdish flags in his music videos.

Bero Bass released a track named Blick Richtung Sonne together with Bonn-based rapper Xatar and the Kurdish folk singer Şivan Perwer.

== Discography ==
=== Studio albums ===
- 2007: Gorillas im Nebel (with OJ Kingpin as La Honda)
- 2008: La Honda Nostra (with OJ Kingpin as La Honda)
- 2009: Basstime
- 2011: Gangstafilm
- 2013: Gorillas im Nebel II (with OJ Kingpin as La honda)
- 2015: Animal
- 2019: Amigo

=== Other Release ===
- 2007: Ich bin ein Outlaw (as La Honda with Eko Fresh and Outlawz)
- 2009: 8 Kammern (with Manuellsen)
- 2009: Playerhater
- 2009: San Quentin
- 2009: Das Leben ist
- 2010: Kölner JVA
- 2010: Ich mach es (with La Honda Allstars)
