= Sherko Bekas =

Iraqi Kurdish poet

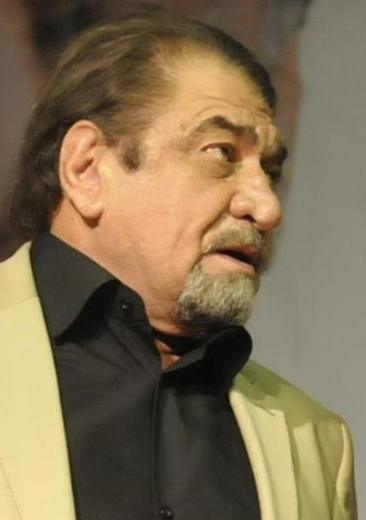
- Sherko Bekas
- Born: Shêrko Fayeq Abdulla Bêkes; 2 May 1940; Sulaymaniyah, Kingdom of Iraq (present-day Silêmanî, Kurdistan Region)
- Died: 4 August 2013 (aged 73); Stockholm, Sweden
- Occupation: Poet
- Spouse: Nasrin Mirza (m. 1969)
- Writing career
- Genres: Poetry; parable; short story

Sherko Fayaq Abdullah (Kurdish: شێرکۆ فایەق عەبدوڵا; 2 May 1940 – 4 August 2013), was a Kurdish poet. He was born on 2 May 1940 in Sulaymaniyah, Iraq as the son of the poet Faiq Bekas. He is widely regarded as one of the poets who founded contemporary Kurdish poetry. Sherko's poetry explores liberty, love, life, and nature while reflecting the contemporary political, cultural, and spiritual conditions of the Kurdish people. Sherko's poetry on freedom and liberty has influenced many poets such as Ahmad Shamlou and Ali Salehi.

== Biograph ==
Sherko Bekes, the son of Fayaq Bekas and Shafiqa Saeedi, was born on 2 May 1940 in the Goizha neighborhood of Sulaymaniyah. After the death of his father, at the age of 8, he lived in extreme poverty and managed to complete high school with great difficulty. He was seventeen years old when he published his first poem in Zhin newspaper. In 1965, Bekas joined the Kurdish liberation movement and worked in the movement's radio station, The Voice of Kurdistan. In 1968, he published the first collection of poems, and he married Nasrin Mirza in 1969. He died of cancer in Stockholm, Sweden on 4 August 2013. Sherko Bekas with his wife Nasrin Mirza

== Literary works ==
In 1971, Bekas introduced the "Rûwange" (vision) element into Kurdish poetry; this was a break from the strict traditional rules of poetry, such as rhyme. The poems translated in "The Secret Diary of a Rose" by Reingard and Shirwan Mirza, with Renate Saljoghi, are examples of this style. For the first time, he introduced the "poster poem" (a term originating from sculpture and painting) in 1975 into Kurdish poetry.

Bekas' works have been translated into Arabic, Swedish, Danish, Dutch, Italian, French and English. In 1987, he was awarded the "Tucholsky scholarship" of the Pen club in Stockholm, and in the same year, he was awarded the freedom prize of the city of Florence.

A two-volume collection of his poetry works has been published in Kurdish under the title "Sherko Bekas' Diwan" in Sweden. These two 1000-page volumes contain his poetic works in their entirety. He has read his poems in Sweden, Denmark, Norway, Germany, Switzerland, Austria, United Kingdom, Russia, and Italy, where he was named honorary citizen of Milan. He visited the United States in 1990.

== Books ==
- Tirîfey Helbest, Salman al-Azami Publishers, Iraq, 1968.
- Kawey Asinger: Dastanêkî honrawayî sar shanoye le no tabloda, Saydiyan Publishers, Mahabad, Iran, 1971.
- Marâyâ saghírah, illustrerad by Fuad Ali, 125 pp., Al-ahâli Publishers, Damascus, Syria, 1988.
- Dall: çîrokî şê'r, Poem, 44 pp., Apec Publishers, Sweden, 1989. ISBN 91-87730-03-0
- Derbendî Pepûle: A Long Poem, 228 pp., Apec Publishers, Sweden, 1991.
- Små speglar: dikter 1978–1989. – Norsborg : Publ. House of Kurdistan, 1989. – 108 s. – ISBN 91-87096-05-6
- Les petits miroirs : poèmes, Translation of his poems in French, by Kamal Maarof, Preface by Guillevic, 95 pp., L'Harmattan Publishers, Paris, 1995. ISBN 2-7384-2059-1
- Dîwanî Şêrko Bêkes, Collection of Poems, vol. I, 992 pp., Sara Publishers, Stockholm, 1990.
- Dîwanî Şêrko Bêkes, Collection of Poems, vol. II, 843 pp., Sara Publishers, Stockholm, 1992.
- Dîwanî Şêrko Bêkes, Collection of Poems, vol. III, 551 pp., Apec Publishers, Stockholm, 1995. ISBN 91-87730-74-X
- Gulbijêrek ji helbestên (Selected Poems), 110 pp., Apec Publishers, 1991. ISBN 91-87730-28-6
- Geheimnisse der Nacht pflücken : Gedichte / aus dem Kurdischen von Reingard und Shirwan Mirza und Renate Saljoghi, 95 pp., Unionsverlag Publishers, Zürich, 1993. ISBN 3-293-00187-4
- Mêrgî zam-, mêrgî hetaw, 182 pp., Kurdistans folkförb., Stockholm, 1996. ISBN 91-972467-2-7
- Xaç û mar û roj-jimêrî şa'êrê, A poetic novel, 374 pp., Apec Publishers, Stockholm, 1997. ISBN 91-89014-20-0
- The secret diary of a rose: a journey through poetic Kurdistan, Translated into English by Reingard and Shirwan Mirza; revised by Luise von Flotow, Ashti Bibani, 1997.
- Bonname : Şê'r. Binkey Edeb û Rûnakbîrî Gelawêj, Sulaimaniya, Iraq 1998.
- Çirakanî ser helemût : pexşan, Sardam Publishers, Iraq, 1999.
- Piyawî la-darsew : Şê'r. Sulaimaniya, Iraq, 2000.
- Qesîdey Rengdan, Xak Publishing Center, Sulaimaniya, Iraq, 2001.
- Ezmûn: 1985–2000, Edited by Yasin Umar, Sardam Publishers, Sulaimaniya, Iraq, 2001.
- Jîn û Baran, Poem. Silêmanî Library, 2001.
- Ji nav Şêrên min. Avesta Publishers, Istanbul, Turkey, 2001. ISBN 975-7112-31-3.
- Xom ew water balindem!, 237 pp., Sardam Publishers, Sulaimaniya, Iraq, 2002.
- Kukuxîtya bizêweke, Children's poetry, Sardam Publishers, Sulaimaniya, 2003.

== Sculpture ==
At the entrance of the Sardaam Publishing House on Salim Street in the city of Slemani, a portrait-style sculpture has been created, three times larger than life. It was made in 2014 by the Kurdish artist and sculptor Shwan Kamal.

In Azadi Park, on the Sherko Bekas hill, a wall relief in the form of a monument has also been created. This project was completed in 2015 by sculptor Shwan Kamal, at the request and commission of the poet’s family.
