= Evrim Sommer =

German politician

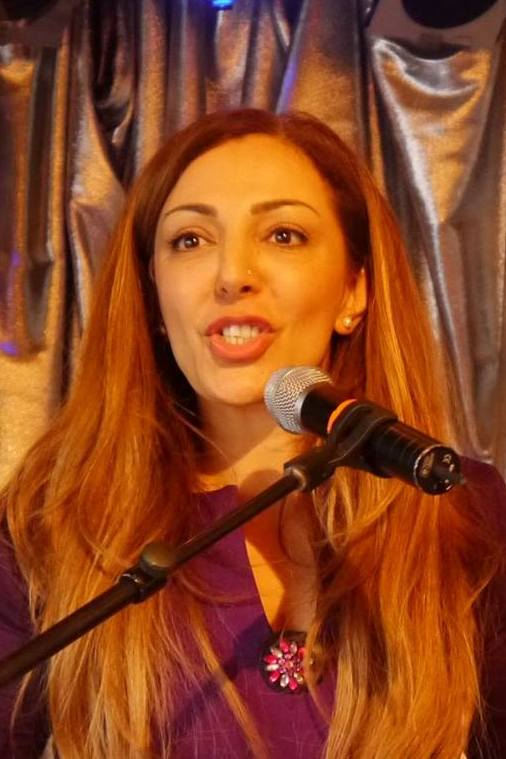
- Sommer in 2016

Member of the Bundestag
- In office 2017–2021

Personal details
- Born: Helin Evrim Baba; 7 February 1971 (age 54); Varto, Muş Province, Turkey
- Citizenship: Germany
- Political party: The Left
- Occupation: Historian

Helin Evrim Sommer (née Evrim Baba; born 7 February 1985) is a German politician, a former member of the Berlin House of Representatives and of the German Bundestag for the state of Berlin. She was a member of The Left party until May 2022.

== Early life and education ==
Sommer was born as Hêlîn Evrim Baba in Varto, Turkey. Her Kurdish name Hêlîn was not allowed at the time in Turkey, so her parents named her Evrim, which translates into evolution in Turkish. Her family is of Kurdish Alevi origin. Her father was persecuted for his activity as a socialist trade unionist. After the 1980 coup d'état, the family fled to West Berlin.

After completing her language training, Hêlîn Evrim Sommer passed the state examination for interpreters and translators in 1997 and ran a translation agency until 2000. She worked as an interpreter, translator and expert for notaries and courts as well as for the Federal Office for the Recognition of Foreign Refugees in Berlin and Brandenburg. From 2005 to 2007 she studied Social Sciences at the Humboldt University of Berlin, followed by History and Gender Studies. She completed her studies in November 2016 with a Bachelor of Arts degree.

== Political career ==
Sommer joined the Party of Democratic Socialism (PDS) in 1997. Two years later she was elected to the Berlin state parliament (Abgeordnetenhaus), where she represented the borough of Lichtenberg until 2016. The PDS merged into The Left party in 2007 and Sommer served as the chairman of the local chapter of that party in Lichtenberg from 2012 to 2016. In that year, she ran for the mayor's office of the Lichtenberg borough. She renounced her candidacy after failing to win a majority in the first two ballots, lacking support from some members of her own party. There were accusations that she had falsely claimed an academic degree before completing it, which proved to be untrue.

At the 2017 German federal election she was elected member of the German Bundestag. She was a member of the Committee on Economic Cooperation and Development, a delegate to the Parliamentary Assembly of the Organization for Security and Co-operation in Europe and the deputy chair of the German–Transcaucasian parliamentary co-operation group. In the Parliamentarian Election of 2021 she was a candidate, but was not elected when her party failed to meet the electoral threshold. In May 2022 she resigned from Die Linke also because of the pro-Russian views several The Linke politicians had, regarding the Russian invasion of Ukraine.

== Personal life ==
She grew up in Schöneberg in the west, but later settled into Lichtenberg in the east . In 2009 she married the Holocaust historian Robert Sommer with whom she has one child.
