= Shwan Kamal =

Artist

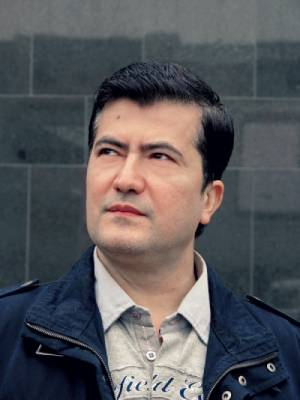
Schwan Kamal in 2008

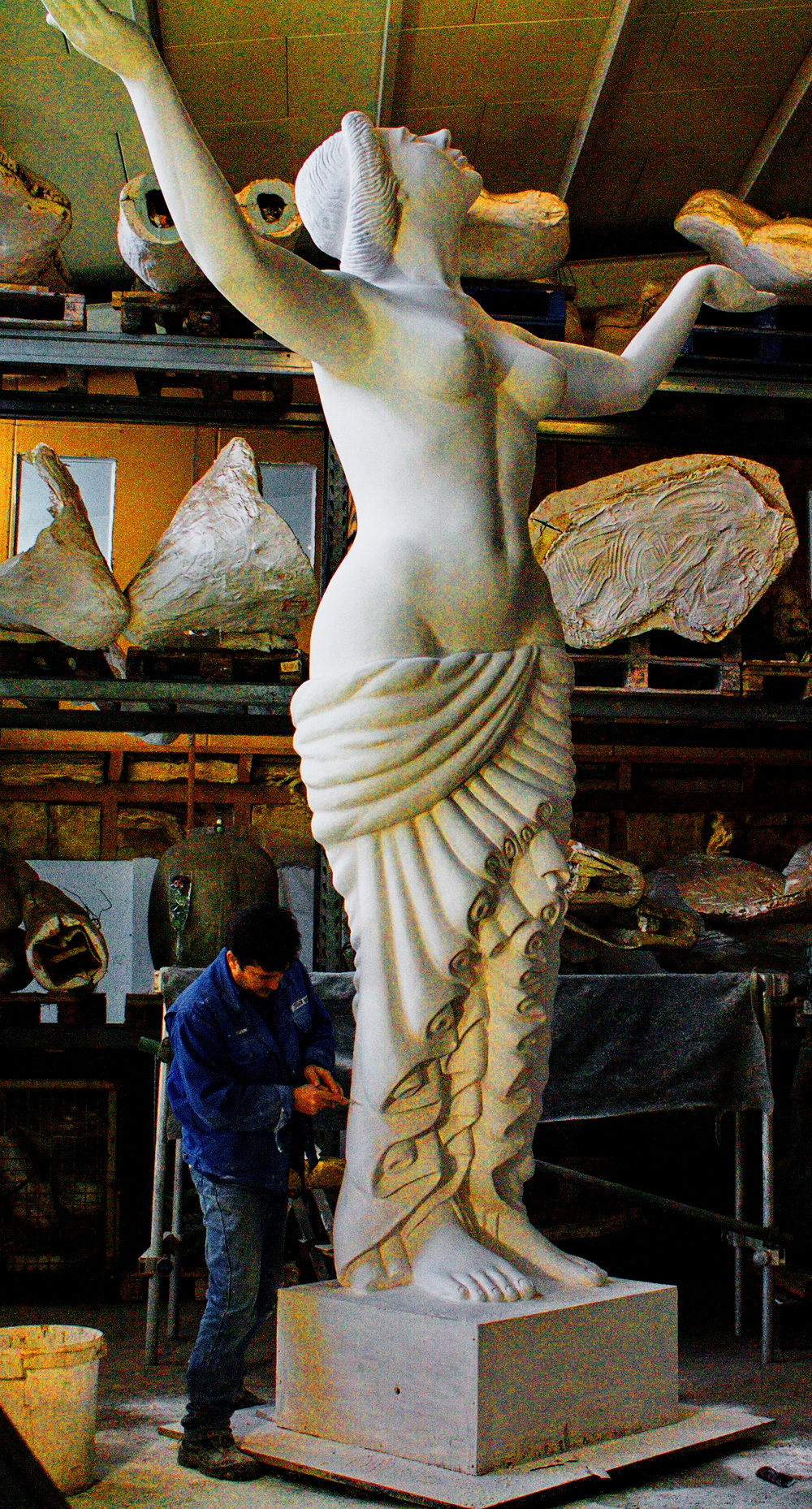
2011

Shwan Kamal (Sorani Kurdish: شوان کەمال) is a Kurdish and German artist and sculptor. He was born in Sulaymaniyah in Iraqi Kurdistan in 1967. He lives and works now in Germany.

== Life and career ==
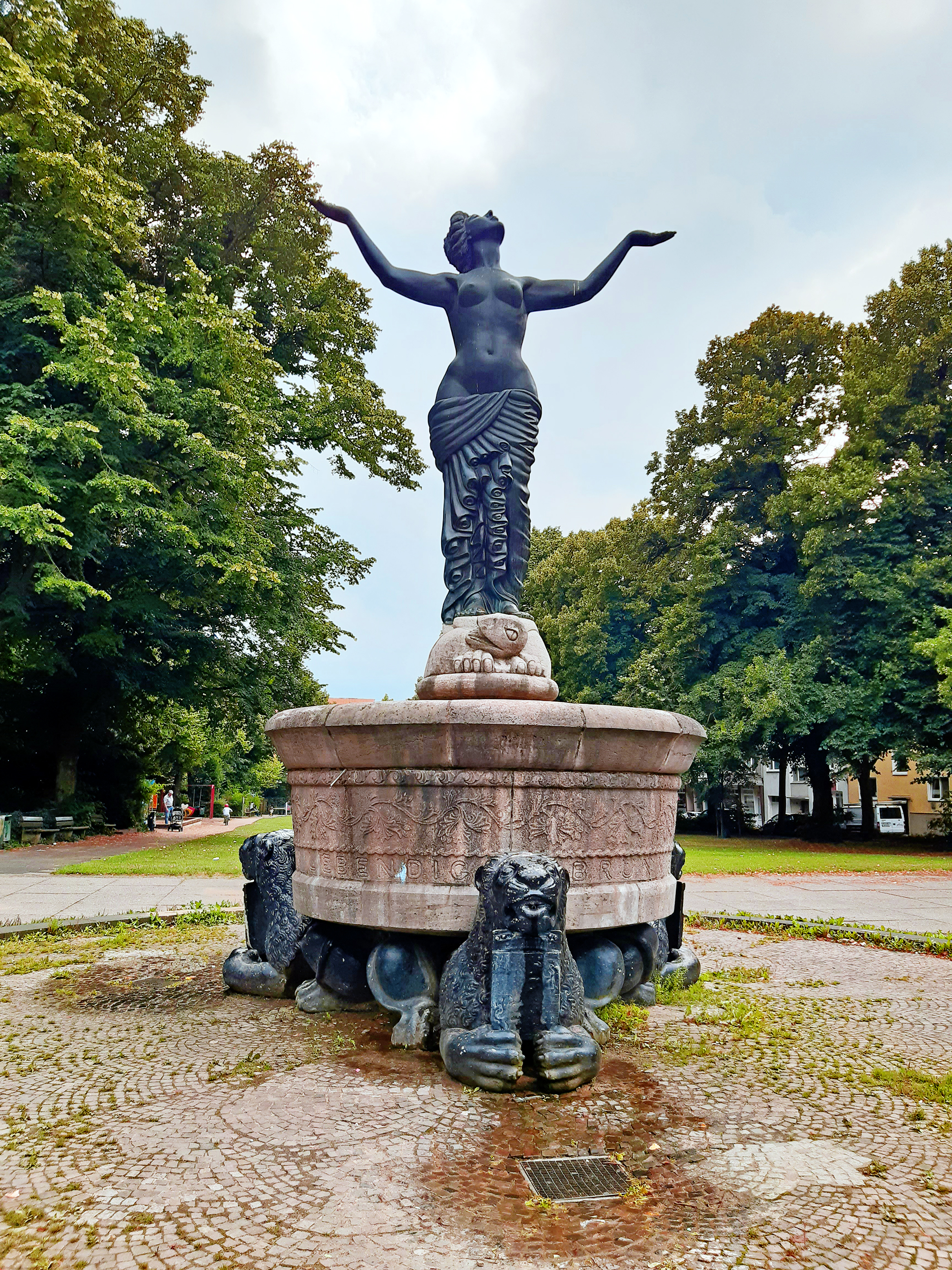
Gerechtigkeitsbrunnen

Shwan Kamal was born in Sulaymaniyah, south of Kurdistan.

He studied art at the Institute of Fine Arts. He obtained a degree in sculpture with honors, and obtained a Bachelor of Arts from the Academy of Fine Arts from the University of Baghdad in 1991. He studied sculpture at the hands of artists and professors such as Dara Hama Saeed, Ismail Fatah Al Turk, Mohammed Ghani Hikmat, Saleh Qargoli and Mortada Al-Haddad.

After graduating from the Academy of Fine Arts in 1991, he returned to Sulaymaniyah and worked as a teacher in the Fine Department of Sculpture until 1994. After the outbreak of the civil war in Kurdistan and the deterioration of the political situation, he immigrated to Turkey, then to Greece, and settled in Germany in 1995 and obtained German citizenship.

From 1995 to 2000, he worked as an artist in the foundry Raymond Keitel in Düsseldorf. From 2000 to 2015, he worked in the foundry Rolf Kayser (Kunstgießer). In 2015, Kamal moved to Sweden, and now he lives and works in Malmö.

In 2018 he earned a Bachelor of Fine Arts, majoring in plastic arts and sculpture.

== Work ==
After graduating from the Academy of Fine Arts, Kamal set up artistic projects and statues in many cities in Kurdistan, Iraq and Europe.

=== Projects in Kurdistan and Iraq ===
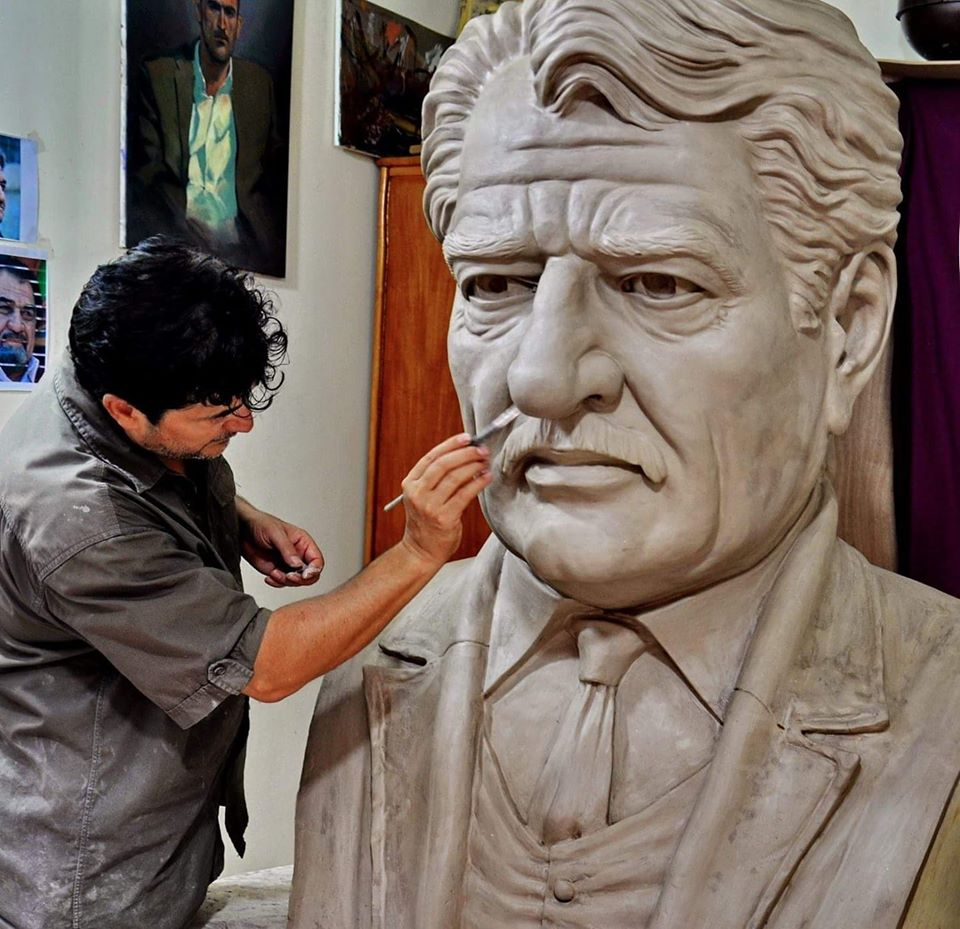
Kamal, at work on Sherkos Bikas statue

After completing his studies of art in 1991, Kamal wanted to have projects, artworks and memorials in Kurdistan. He made some of these works until the outbreak of the civil war and his migration to Europe, including the following:

- 1992: Statue of the engineer Hama Saaded in front of the electricity department building in Sulaymaniyah
- 1992: Statue of Tawfaq Kahraba, who was killed in a bombing in Halabja
- 1993: Statue of Xala Hajji in Al-Aqari area in Sulaymaniyah
- 1993: The monument of Shahidane Chiman in the Khanqa Falket in Sulaymaniyah
- 1994: Statue of Bakhtiar al-Askari in the Iskan locality in Erbil, the capital of the Kurdistan Region
- 2013: The statue of Justice (Eustasia) in front of a court building in Erbil
- 2014: The statue of poet Sherko Bekas in front of Sardam Building in Salem Street in Sulaymaniyah
- 2015: The memorial to the Kurdish poet Sherko Bekas on his last resting place in Azadi Park in the center of Sulaymaniyah

=== Projects in Germany and Sweden ===
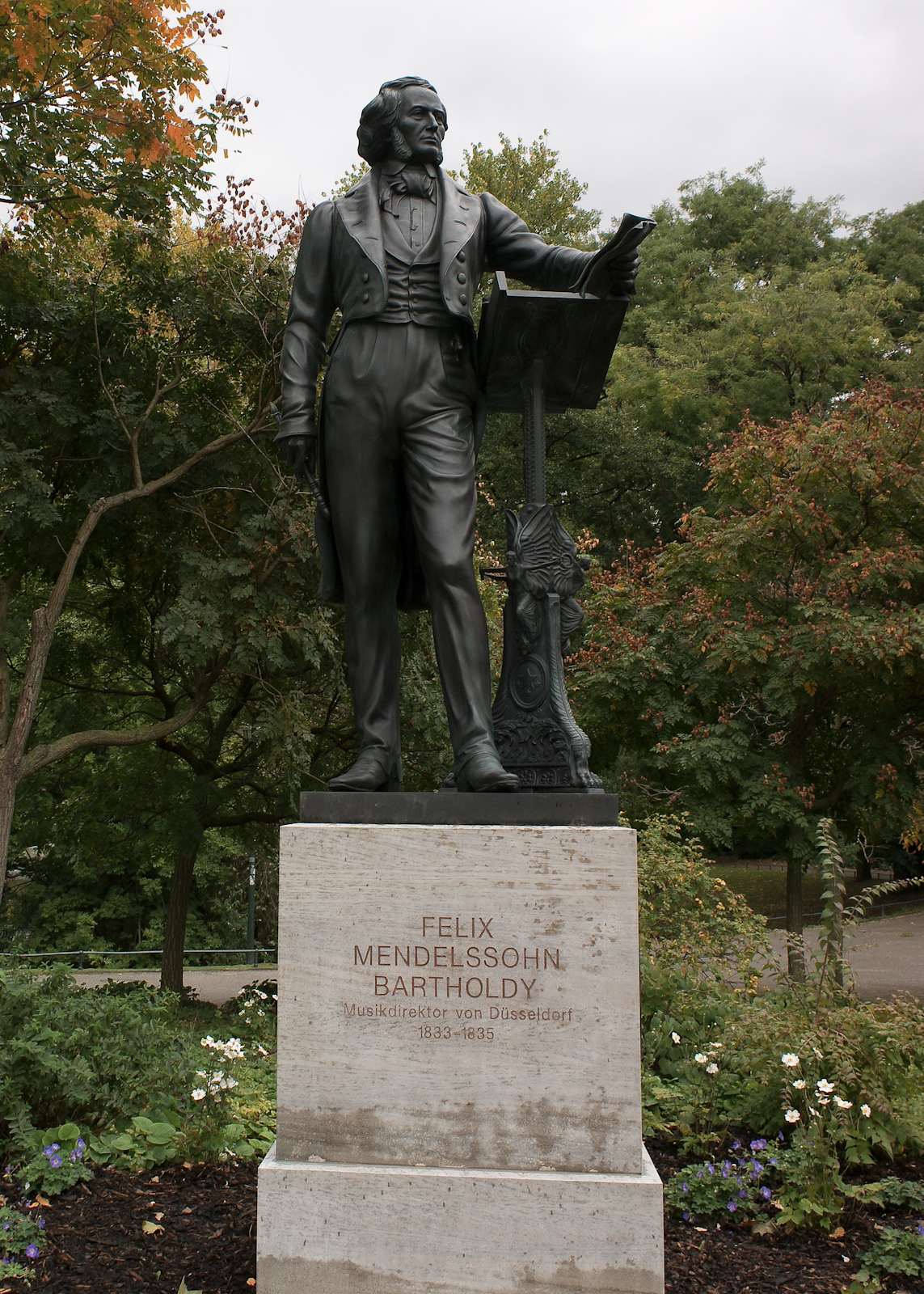
Felix Mendelssohn Bartholdy memorial in Düsseldorf

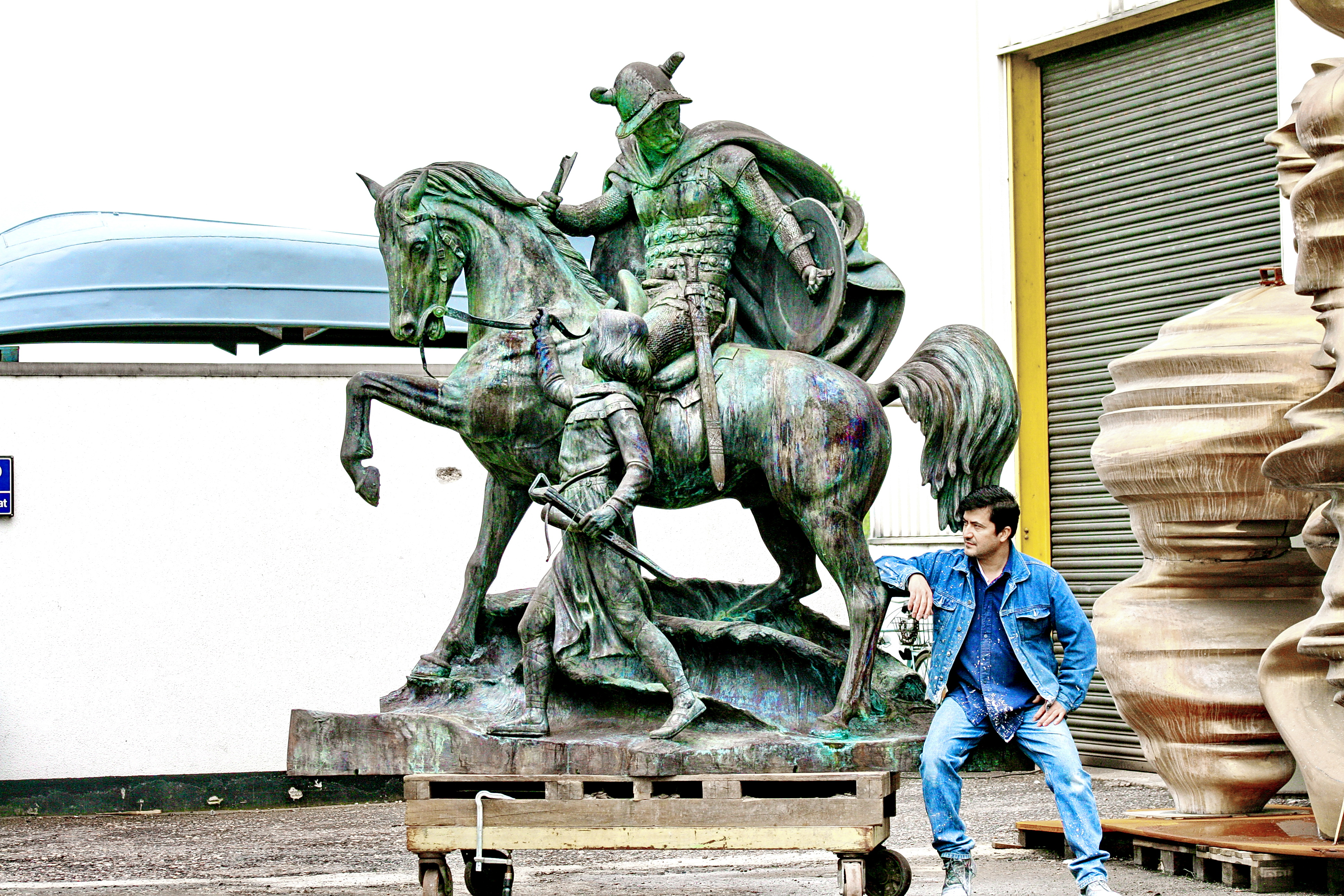
Kamal with Arnold Ross statue

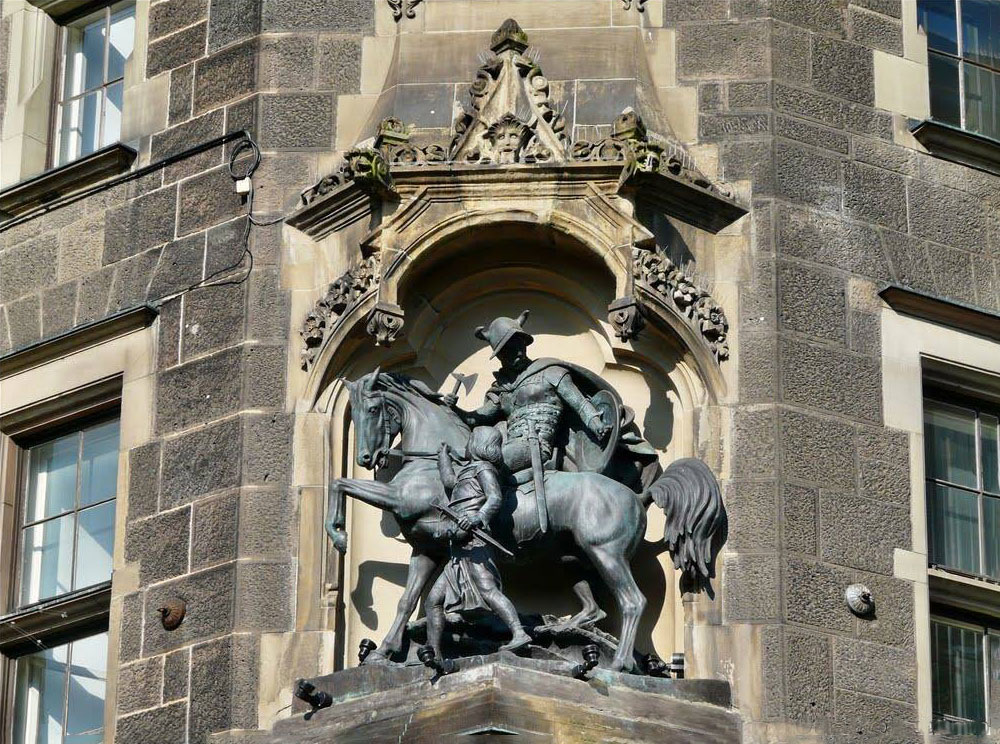
Elberfelder ritter

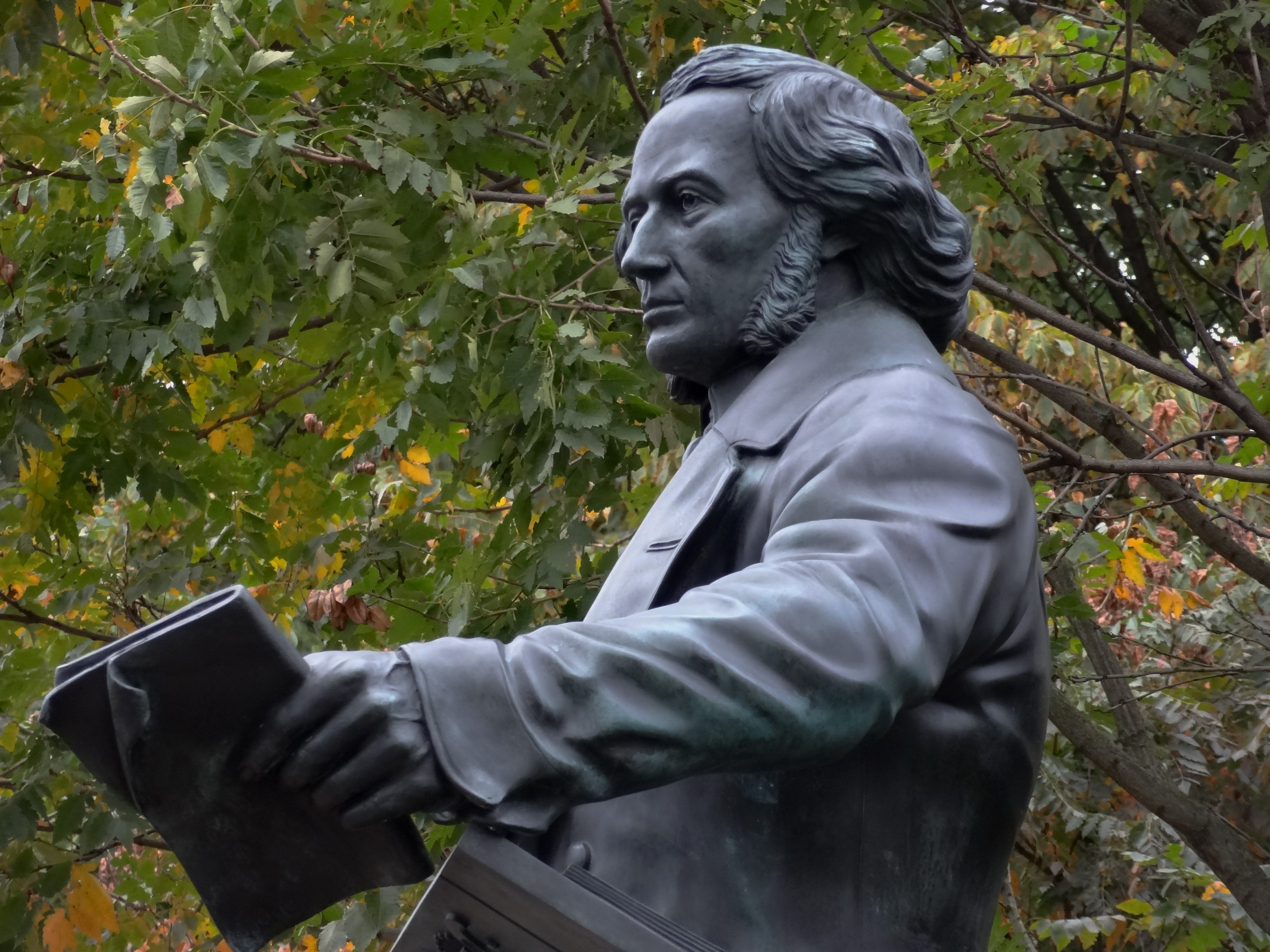
Felix Mendelssohn

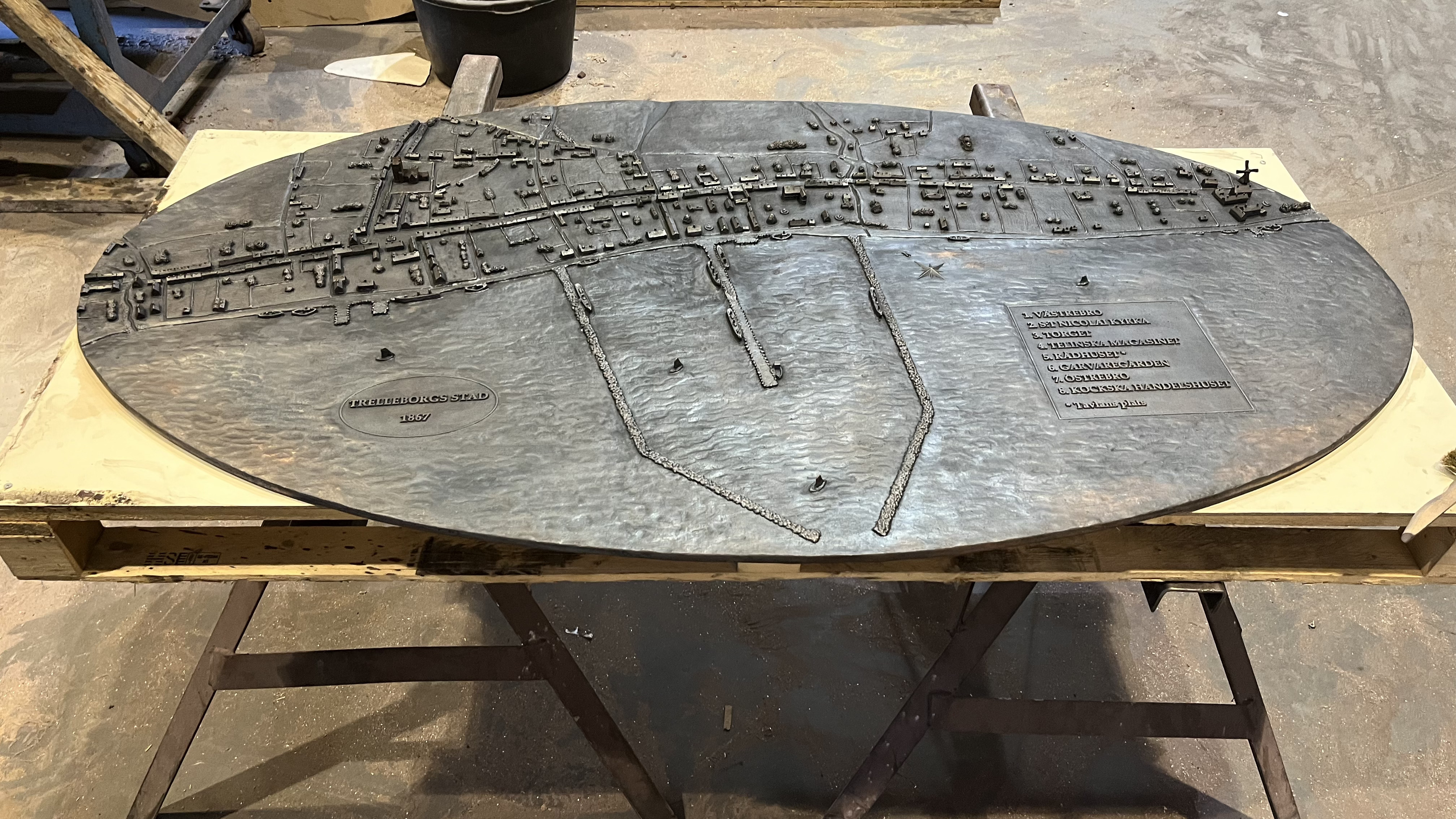

- Between 1995 and 2015, Kamal made many statues and monuments in German cities, including many statues for the Rolf Kayser foundry in Düsseldorf. This foundry dates back to the 1950s. Kamal made metal statues for many great international artists, such as Tony Cragg, Thomas Schütte, Katrina Frege and Macdelina Abakanovich of Poland. During the Second World War, most German cities were ravaged by the bombing of the Allied forces, and many historical statues were destroyed. In recent years, the German authorities have re-made many of these statues and monuments. Schwann recreated these statues and erected memorials in German cities.
- 2002: Monument to the people's musician and singer Gustav Adolf Uthmann in the North Park in Wuppertal
- 2009: Monument to Faris (Arnold Ross) in the Rathaus building of Wuppertal
- 2010: Statue (Justice) on the right side of the main gate of the Rathaus building in Wuppertal
- Statue (The Truth) on the left side of the main gate of the Wuppertal Rathaus building
- 2011: Statue (helping the poor) in the center of Wuppertal in the Church Square
- 2011: Statue (Gerechtigkeitsbrunnen) in the Republic Square in Wuppertal
- 2012: Statue of the world musician Felix Mendelssohn in front of the Opera Palace building in Düsseldorf
- 2017: Statue of Ulla Jacobsson for the Mölndal city of Göteborg
- 2019: Relief statue of the city of Ahos in the 14th century in front of the museum of Åhus, in the Skåna land of Sweden
- 2020: Statue (drummer on elephant) in the Folks Park in Malmö, Sweden
- 2022: Creation of a bronze award for photography called the Kamran Award at the request of Metography
- 2022: Creation of a bronze prize for theater called the Dana Rauf Award at the request of the Kepr Publishing Center
- 2023: Karo Literary Award for Kurdish writer Hussein Arif
- In 2025, a historical bronze model of Trelleborg, depicting the city as it was in 1867, was unveiled and placed in front of the City Hall in Rådhuset. The model shows a detailed representation of the old city, and was donated to the municipality by the association Gamla Trelleborg and the Kockska Stiftelserna foundation. The unveiling ceremony took place on September 27, 2025, in Rådhustorget (City Hall Square).

== Career and Commissions ==
In mid-April 2025, at the official invitation of the Prime Minister of the Kurdistan Region, the renowned sculptor Shwan Kamal visited Erbil. He held a formal meeting with Prime Minister Masrour Barzani to discuss the strategic planning of monumental sculpture projects. The discussions focused on creating large-scale monuments of historical Kurdish figures across various cities in the Kurdistan Region. These works are envisioned as landmark installations, intended to be among the most significant public art projects in the Middle East.

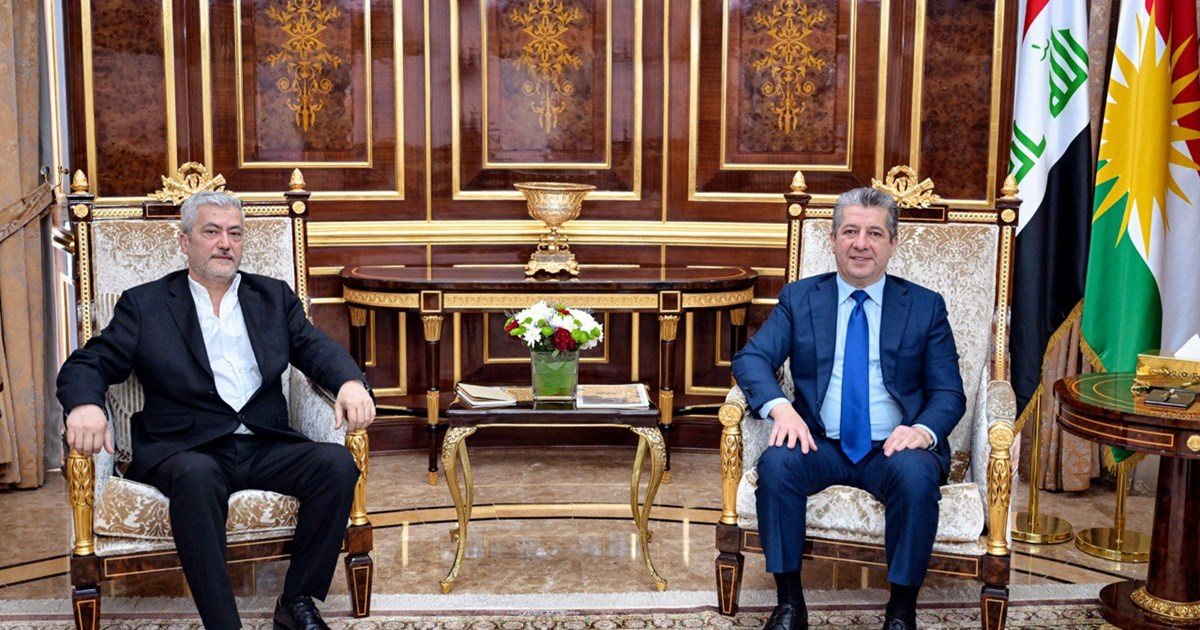
Artist Shwan Kamal with PM Barzani
