= Hamide Akbayir =

German politician

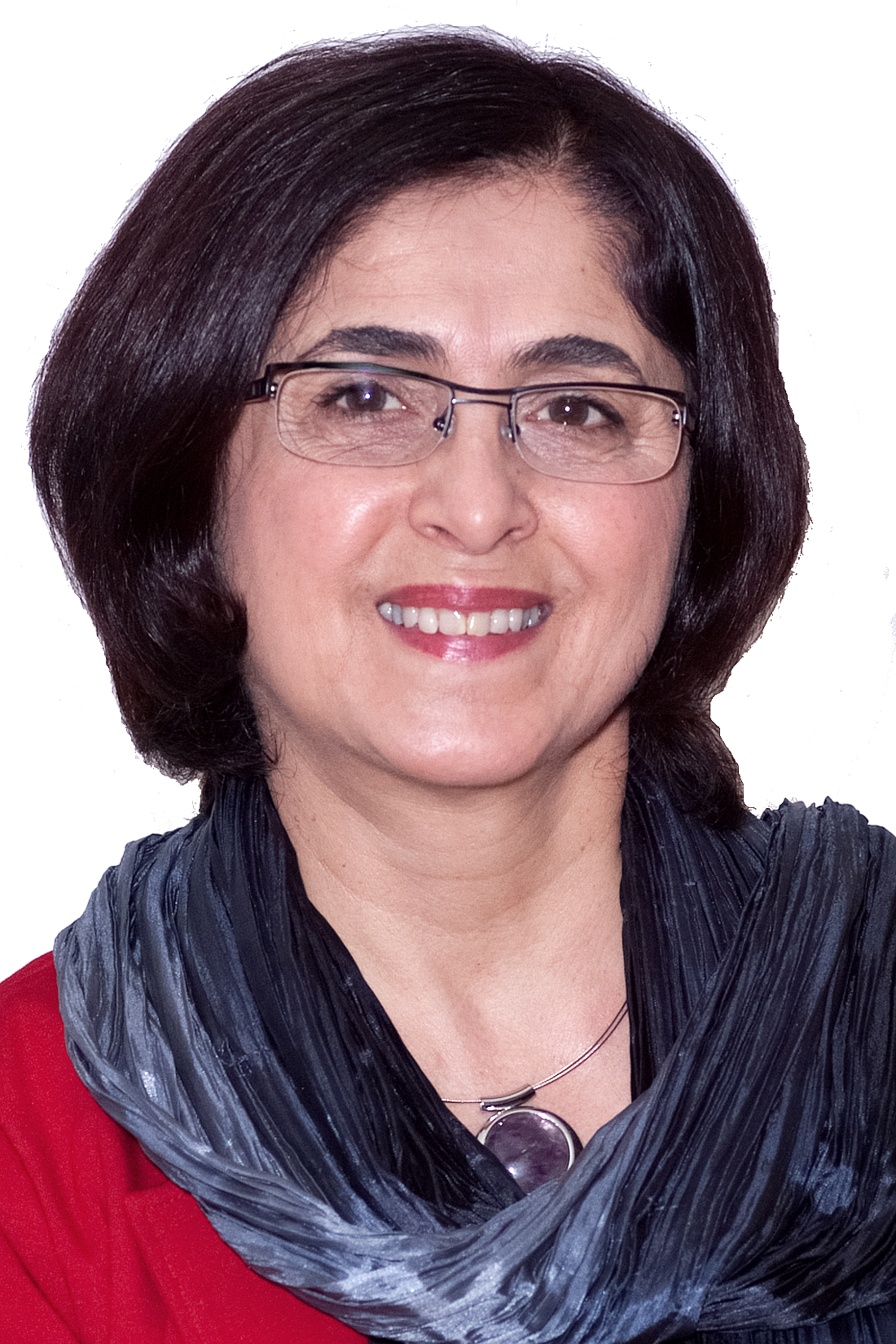

Member of the Landtag of North Rhine-Westphalia
- In office 2010–2012

Personal details
- Born: May 10, 1959 (age 67) Frac, Tunceli Province, Turkey
- Party: Die Linke

Hamide Akbayir (born 10 May 1959 in Frac, Tunceli Province, Turkey) is a German politician and member of the Left in North Rhine-Westphalia, a state chapter of the Left Party of Germany.

== Life ==
Hamide Akbayir has lived in Germany since 1972 and completed her Fachabitur (a kind of Abitur that prepares students for Fachhochschule) in 1977. In 1980 she graduated as a Chemical Technician, and since then, she has worked for the Institute of Biochemistry at the University of Cologne.

She was a member of the Alliance 90/The Greens from 1993 until 1997, and in 1998 she joined the Party of Democratic Socialism (PDS). From 1998 until 2004 she belonged to the Foreigner Advisory Board of the city of Cologne. In 2007 she became a member of the state party governing body for the Left in North Rhine-Westphalia.

During the 2010 North Rhine-Westphalia election, she stood as a candidate of the Left in a local electoral district of Hagen, and as a result of the election, she entered the state parliament as part of the party list. Her political priorities concerned women's equality, environmental protection, and peace. In the 2012 election her party did not win any seats.

Hamide Akbayir is the chairperson of the Kurdish organization Yekkom in Germany.

== Works ==
- (in German, with Monika Morres): "Backgrounds of Immigration and Flight with examples from Kurdish Women" (Hintergründe von Migration und Flucht am Beispiel der Kurd(inn)en). Published in: Immigration in a Globalizing World (Zuwanderung im Zeichen der Globalisierung), Ed. Christoph Butterwegge and Gudrun Hentges, 2000 (ISBN 3-8100-2603-4)
