= Jamal Nebez =

Kurdish writer and mathematician (1933–2018)

- Kurdish: جەمال نەبەز, Cemal Nebez
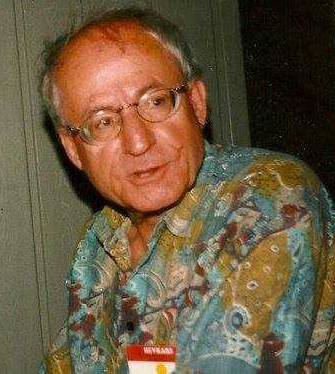
- Born: 1 December 1933; Sulaymaniyah, Kingdom of Iraq
- Died: 8 December 2018 (aged 85); Berlin, Germany
- Education: University of Baghdad
- Occupations: linguist, historian, journalist, translator, lecturer, mathematician and writer

Jamal Nebez (Kurdish: جەمال نەبەز, Cemal Nebez; 1 December 1933 – 8 December 2018) was a Kurdish linguist, mathematician, politician, author, translator and writer. He studied Islamic law, philosophy, theology, physics and mathematics at the University of Baghdad in the 1950s. In 1956, he prepared a stenciled script on algebra and in 1960, succeeded in publishing the first physics book in Kurdish, including a rich glossary of Kurdish terms pertaining to physics and mathematics. He translated several literary works, including works of Nikolai Gogol and William Shakespeare into Kurdish. He also wrote and published several books on a variety of topics. Most of the books are mainly about topics related to Kurds.

== Education ==
Parallel to attending the state schools, he had the opportunity to study Islamic law, philosophy and theology. He studied physics and mathematics at the science faculty at the Teachers' Training Faculty at the University of Baghdad in the first half of the 1950s. From October 1955 to 1961, Nebez was a secondary school teacher of physics and math. For three years, he taught in Iraqi Kurdistan; first in Kirkuk and then in Arbil. Then he taught for three years in Basrah and Baghdad. In the summer of 1956, Nebez travelled to Syria and Lebanon, where he met many Kurdish intellectuals, poets and writers who worked and published in Kurdish. In the summer of 1957, he travelled to Iranian Kurdistan and Tehran. Just like in Lebanon, he also met many intellectuals in Iranian Kurdistan. He met the famous Kurdish cleric and writer, Ayatollah Mohammed Mardokh-i Kurdistani (1885–1975) whom he agreed with to serve the Kurdish language and culture.

In 1962, he left for Europe to pursue his studies in pedagogy, Iranology, and Islamic studies. He attended the Universities of Munich, Würzburg and the University of Hamburg. He also studied political science, journalism and law at the Free University of Berlin. In 1965, while a student in Munich, he jointly founded the National Union of the Kurdish Students in Europe (NUKSE) with his partisan friends Brusk Ibrahim and Latif Ali. In 1985, he and other immigrants from Kurdistan, mostly academics, scientists, literates and artists founded the Kurdish Academy of Science and Arts, which was based in Stockholm.

In the 1970s and at the beginning of the 1980s Jemal held several positions. From 1971–72 he worked as a lecturer at the Free University of Berlin at the Ethnological Institute. From 1971–78 he was also a lecturer at the Institute for Iranian Philology. 1972–76 Scientific Employee in the field of Orientalistics at Deutsche Forschungsgemeinschaft(German Research Foundation) From 1978–82 he worked as an assistant Professor, in the topics of Islamic Iran, Persian and other Iranian languages, also at the Free University of Berlin. And from 1978 to 1983 as an examiner of Persian language translators and interpreters in Berlin (Staatliches Institut für Dolmetscher und Übersetzer) and examiner of Kurdish language translators and interpreters in Munich (Bavarian Ministry of Education, Science and Culture).

== Works ==
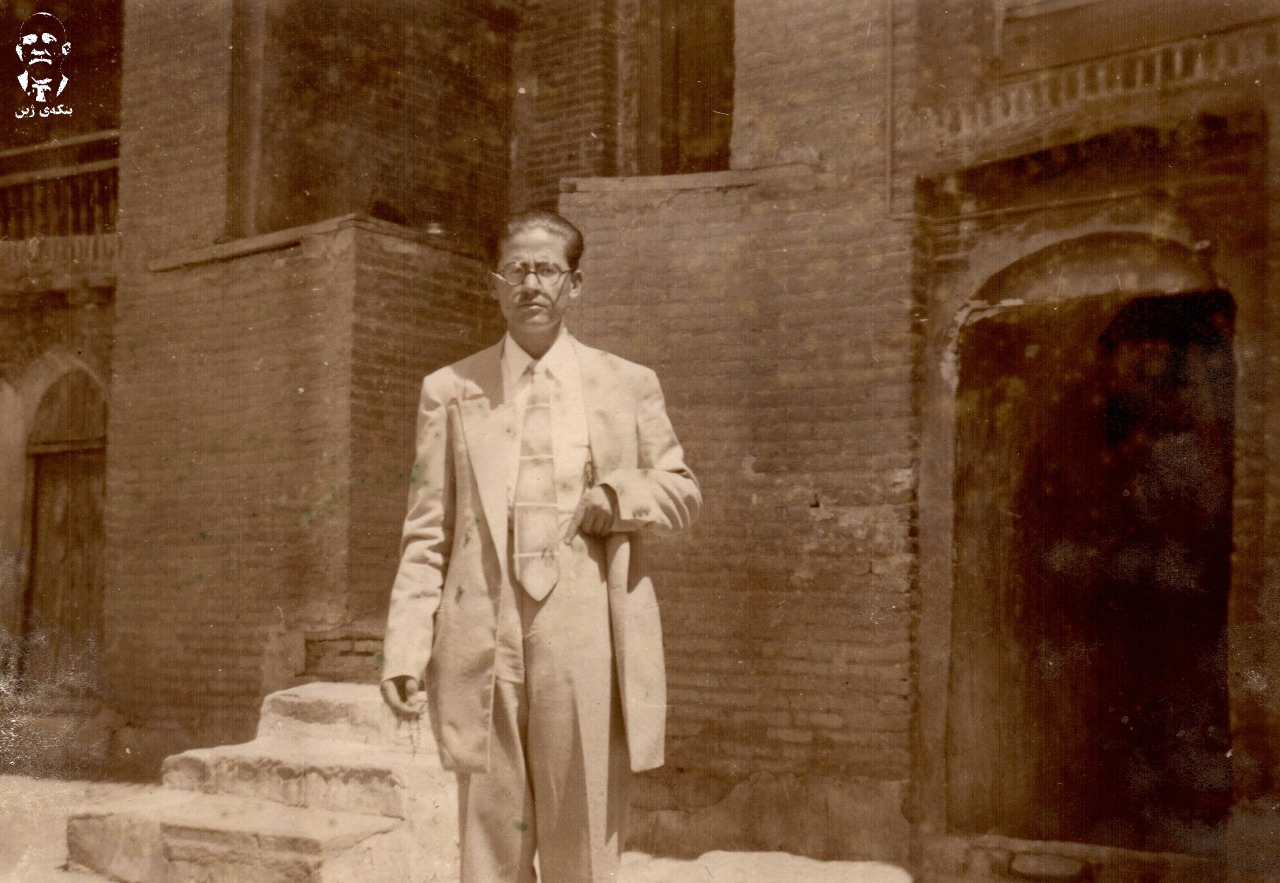
Jamal Nabaz in 1952.

Nebez wrote many essays in Arab newspapers in Baghdad about the political, social and human rights of the Kurds. One of these publications, in spring 1954, was a critical article published in "Sawt al-Ahali"(voice of the population) on a press-interview given by Celal Bayar, then expresident of Turkey, during a sojourn in the United States, in which Bayar denied the existence of any other people but Turks in Turkey. During the two years he had taught in Kirkuk, he created the basis for the first physics and mathematics books in the Kurdish language. In 1956, he prepared a stencilized script on Algebra and in 1960, succeeded in publishing the first physics book in Kurdish under the title, "Introduction into the Mechanics and Properties of Matter", including a rich glossary of Kurdish terms pertaining to physics and mathematics. In the course of his sojourn in Damascus, he managed to write a booklet in Arabic on "The Kurdish Freedom Movement and its Aims" in 1957. He published another book in the same year, titled "Kurdish in Latin Script", in Baghdad. He published many books on Kurdish language and he also translated some literary works, including works of Gogol and Shakespeare into Kurdish.

=== List of Books ===
- Çirokî Gerdaweke "The Tempest". Translation of William Shakespeare's play into Kurdish, Baghdad 1955.
- Lalo Kerim "Uncle Kerim". A Kurdish novel, published in Hewlêr 1956, second edition in Stockholm 1986.
- Xwêndewarî be Zimanî Kurdî "Primary Education in the Kurdish Language". On Problems of Schooling and Learning and How to Solve Them, Baghdad 1957, Second Edition in Stockholm 1987,
- Nusînî Kurdî be Latînî "Writing Kurdish in Latin Letters", Çapxaney Me'arif, Baghdad 1957.
- Wergêran Hunere "Translation is an Art", Sulaimani, Çapxaney Jîn, 1958.
- Palto "The Coat". Translation of Nikolai Gogol's novel into Kurdish, from Arabic and English, Baghdad 1958.
- Seretay Mîkanîk û Xomalekanî Made "Introduction into the mechanics and properties of matter", Baghdad 1960.
- Kurdische Schriftsprache. Eine Chrestomathie moderner Texte. "Kurdish Written Language. A Collection of Modern Texts", Hamburg: Buske Verlag, 1969.
- Sprichwörter und Redensarten aus Kurdistan "Proverbs and Stock Phrases from Kurdistan", Munich, National Union of Kurdish Students in Europe NUKSE, 1970.
- Der Kurdische Fürst Mir-i Kora (Rawandizi) im Spiegel der Morgenländischen und Abendländischen Quellen "The Kurdish Prince Mir-i Kora (Rawandizi) in the Light of Oriental and Occidental Sources". A Scientific Contribution to the Kurdish History, Hamburg 1970. Translated into Arabic by Fakhri Salaschor, Publication of the Academy of Science and Art, Stockholm and Hawler 1994.
- Kurdische Märchen und Volkserzählungen "Kurdish Fairytales and Folktales", published by the National Union of Kurdish Students in Europe NUKSE in Bamberg 1972.
- Zimanî Yekgirtûy Kurdî "Towards a Unified Kurdish Language", published by the National Union of Kurdish Students in Europe – NUKSE in Germany 1976. Second Edition by the Seyidiyan Publishing House in Mehabad in 1979.
- Hendêk le Kêşe Binretêkanî Qutabxaney Kurdî Sosiyalizm "Some Fundamental Considerations of the Kurdish School of Socialism", Stockholm 1984. Second Edition published in Hewler 2001.
- Govari Komonistawey ‚Yekêtîy Têkoşîn‘ (1944–1945) û Îdyolojîy Xurdeborjway Marksistî Kurd "The Communist Kurdish Journal „Yekêtîy Têkoşîn“ [Unification of Struggle] in 1944–45 and the Ideology of the Petit Bourgeois-Marxist Kurds", Publication of the Kurdish Academy of Science and Art, Stockholm 1988.
- Rojanî Awareyîm le Swêsre "My Exile in Switzerland", memoirs of a 1962 sojourn in Geneva, published in Sulaimani 1999 by "Binkey Edebî û Ronakbîrî Gelawêj" "Gelawêj Foundation for Literature and Intellectuals".
