= Elisabeth Böhm =

German architect

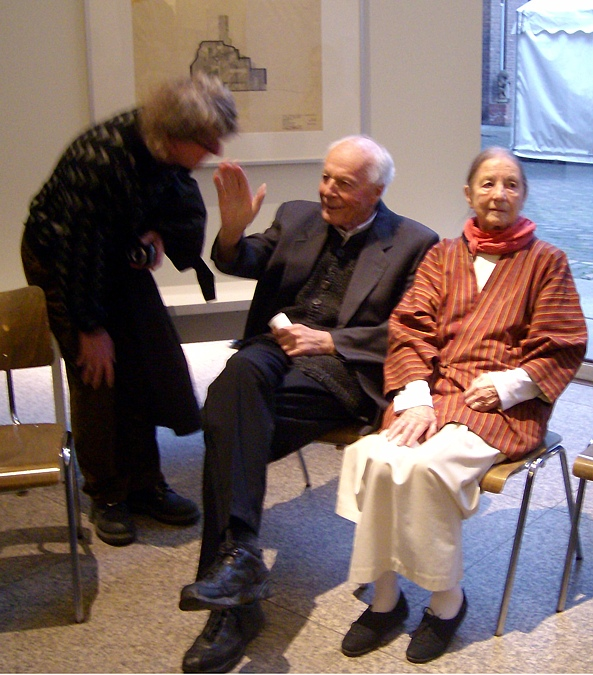
Böhm with her husband Gottfried in 2009

Elisabeth Böhm née Haggenmüller (18 June 1921 in Mindelheim – 6 September 2012 in Cologne) was a German architect who frequently worked together with her husband, Gottfried Böhm.

== Biography ==
Böhm studied architecture at the Technical University of Munich where she met Gottfried Böhm whom she married in 1948. Her husband took over the family architecture business in Cologne from his father Dominikus Böhm who died in 1955. Initially, Böhm spent most of her time at home raising their four children, only spending short periods at the office. She later returned to more intensive work, developing plans for housing projects and housing estates. Of particular note are her interior designs for the castle of Godesburg, near Bonn (1959), the town hall of Bensberg in Bergisch Gladbach (1969) and for the modern additions to Kauzenburg Castle near Bad Kreuznach in the early 1970s. She was also behind the circular foyer designed in connection with the expansion of the Stuttgart Theatre in 1984.

Böhm lived and worked in Cologne until her death. Her relationship with her husband and her sons and their reactions to her death is explored in a 2014 documentary titled "Concrete Love — The Böhm Family."
