= 2018 visit by Recep Tayyip Erdoğan to Germany =

In September 2018, Recep Tayyip Erdoğan visited Germany at the invitation of the German president Frank-Walter Steinmeier who had invited Erdogan after his re-election in 2018. Erdogan arrived on 27 September and departed on 29 September. With the invitation by Steinmeier, the visit became a state visit which included military honors and a state banquet.

== Background ==
Recep Tayyip Erdoğan had visited Germany several times before, also in 2014 as a prime minister, but as an acting president, it was his first journey to Germany. In July, the German newspaper Bild reported that Erdogan would visit Germany in September. That it would be a state visit which includes a state banquet and military honors were confirmed in early August 2018. In an op-ed in the Frankfurter Allgemeine Zeitung the day before, Erdoğan aimed for a restart in Turkish-German relations. He also wanted Germany to designate the Gülen movement, which his Government blames for a failed coup d'état, a terrorist organization. Germany is home to a diaspora of about 3 Million people from Turkey. Other issues at stake were the press freedom and detention conditions in Turkey. Against his visit, protests were held in several cities in Germany, and prominent politicians refused to take part in the state banquet for Erdogan hosted by the German president.

=== Security measures ===
Recep Tayyip Erdoğan descended upon Berlin through airspace excluded for private aircraft and snipers were deployed on top of the roof of the hotel he was staying. For his safety, some 4200 German police officers were in charge in Berlin where several streets were closed in the governmental district. In Cologne, where Erdogan inaugurated a mosque on Sunday, 3000 police officers were deployed for his security.

== 27 September ==
Recep Tayyip Erdoğan and his wife Emine Erdoğan arrived on 27 September 2018 at the Berlin Tegel airport where he was received on a red carpet cordoned with military officers. Outside the airport, his arrival was met with protests from Reporters without Borders, who displayed a screen reading "Erdoğan lands in Berlin, Journalists in Prison". In Berlin, he stayed at the Hotel Adlon on Pariser Platz.

== 28 September ==
=== Military honors ===
In the morning Erdoğan and his wife were welcomed by the German President Frank Walter Steinmeier at Bellevue Palace. The two presidents then walked through a military formation and the national anthems of Germany and Turkey were played.

=== Meeting with Angela Merkel ===
In their meeting, it was discussed how to improve the situation for the 3 million people of Turkish origin living in Germany and diplomatic and economic relations between the two countries.

=== Press conference ===
At the press conference, Erdoğan threatened not to show up, if Can Dündar the former Editor-in-chief of the Turkish newspaper Cumhuriyet would also take part. Can Dündar lives in German exile, but is wanted by the Turkish authorities. Eventually, Can Dündar decided not want to take part to avoid a diplomatic spat. As Erdoğan had the word, he again demanded the extradition of Can Dündar for him being a criminal, to which Angela Merkel replied that in the case of Can Dündar, they had different points of view and the fact that Dündar did not take part was Dündars decision, not that of the German Government.

During the press conference, a journalist was pulled out from the crowd for wearing a T-shirt with the slogan liberty for journalists in the Turkish language. The German authorities defended themselves that it was not allowed to wear a T-shirt with a political slogan during the press conference.

=== State banquet ===
The state banquet for Erdoğan took place at the Bellevue palace in Berlin. Before the visit, a state banquet was criticized by several politicians as it would be too much of an honor for a controversial partner of Germany. The party leaders Christian Lindner of the Free Democratic Paty (FDP), Annalena Baerbock and Robert Habeck from the Greens and Alice Weidel and Alexander Gauland of the Alternative for Germany (AfD) declined to attend in protest against Erdogan. Sevim Dagdelen from the Die Linke reasoned that she does not want to dine with someone who supports terrorists in the Syrian Civil War or holds thousands of politicians as prisoners while Bijan Djir-Sarai from the FDP declined due to the German prisoners in Turkish prisons. The fact that Angela Merkel was also not on the list of attendees was also politicized, but the chancellery replied that Merkel took part only a few times in state banquets and would meet Erdogan already twice elsewhere during the visit. Many Ministers of her cabinet did also not take part.

==== Speeches ====
During the state banquet Steinmeier addressed the attendees, he lauded how the Turkish diaspora contributed to the economy of Germany and also criticized the NSU murders against Turkish nationals for which Germany was ashamed. But he also voiced concern for the human rights situation in Turkey and emphasized that during the Nazi Government Germans received asylum in Turkey and that now 80 years later, Germany can return the favor of giving asylum to Turks.

Erdoğan replied in a prepared speech in which the content the attendees were given handouts before the banquet lauding the Turkish German relations from their military alliance during World War I to modern times. But he then went on beyond the prepared speech to criticize that in Germany it was able for members of the "terror organization" Kurdistan Workers' Party (PKK) to walk free and demanded a crackdown on terror in which he also included the Gulen movement.

At the reception of the banquet, Cem Özdemir of the Greens greeted Erdoğan in the hope to talk to him later in the evening. He wore a sticker saying in Turkish, Give to us the liberty of thought, an expression in the play Don Carlos by Friedrich Schiller. The two then did not talk anymore during the banquet.

== 29 September ==
=== Erdogan-Laschet meeting ===
Armin Laschet, the Premier Minister of North Rhine-Westphalia wanted to meet Erdoğan in Schloss Wahn, but the owners of the castle demanded from a court in Cologne to prohibit it for political reasons, alleging that they had rented it to the University of Cologne and they were only made aware of the Erdoğan-Laschet meeting through the media the day before. Laschet and Erdoğan then met at the Cologne Airport.

=== DiTiB mosque inauguration ===
After having met with Armin Laschet at the Airport of Cologne, Erdoğan inaugurated the central mosque of the Turkish-Islamic Union for Religious Affairs (DİTİB). The inauguration was planned to be held in attendance of thousands of attendees but the DİTİB failed to provide a security concept for the event and therefore Cologne prohibited a public inauguration and only permitted one with guests. Colognes Mayor Henriette Reker lamented that the mosque was not officially inaugurated before as the mosque was already in use also before Erdogan's visit. She complained that with this belated inauguration, the DİTİB revealed that it was an extension of Erdogan's influence and not interested in cooperation with German institutions.

== Aftermath ==
Returned to Turkey, Erdoğan lauded the hosts Angela Merkel and Frank-Walter Steinmeier and suggested their visit to Turkey in 2019. But he also recalled that during the state banquet, Steinmeier had pointed to his concerns over the human rights situation in Turkey which led Erdoğan to also accuse Germany that it protected terrorists referring to members of the Turkish opposition living in Germany. Further, he demanded the extradition of 136 people, who according to Erdoğan were terrorists.
