= Cologne Central Mosque =

Mosque in Ehrenfeld, Cologne, Germany

- Zentralmoschee Köln
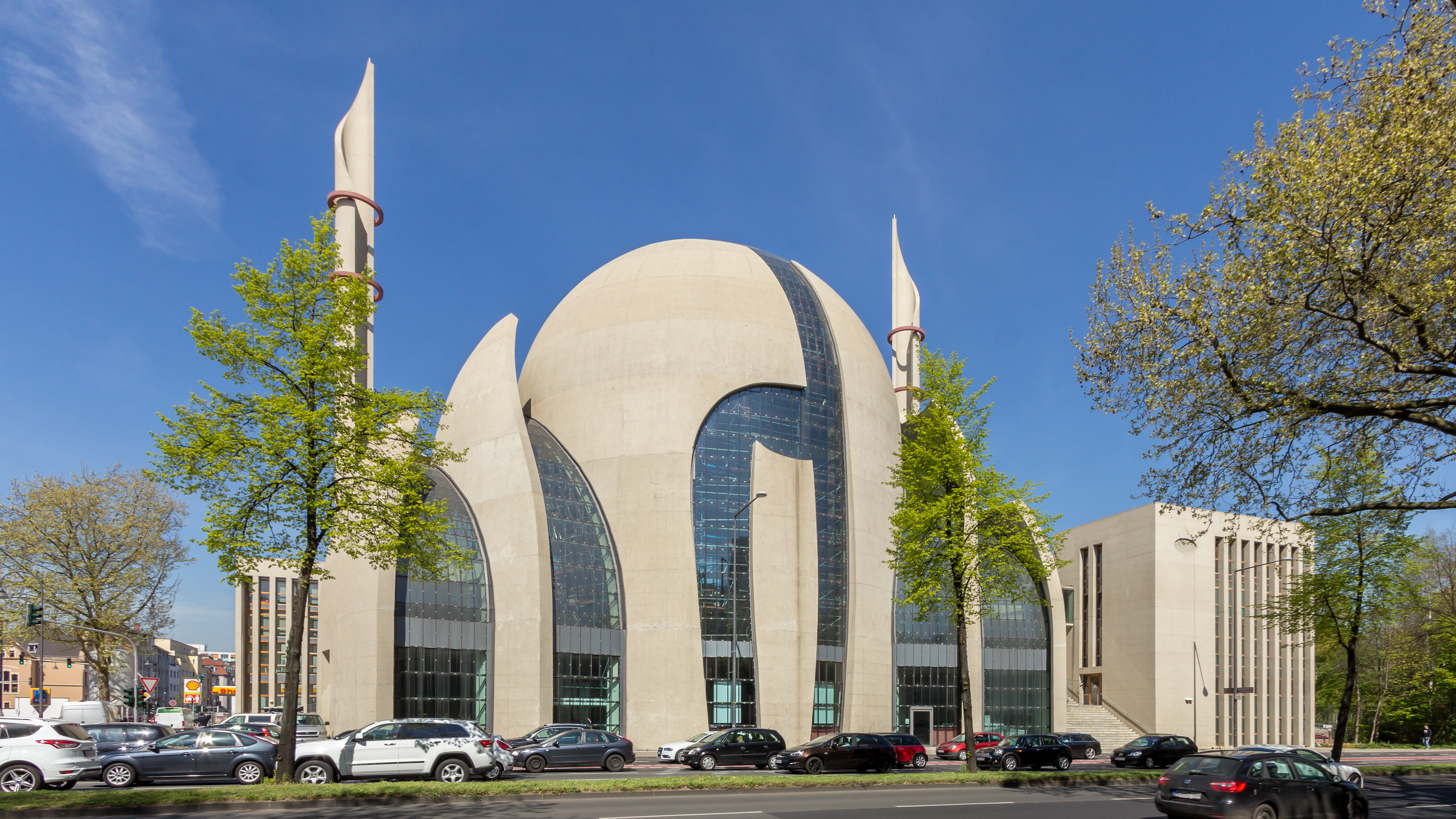
- The mosque in April 2015

- Location within North Rhine-Westphalia

Religion
- Affiliation: Sunni Islam
- Ecclesiastical or organisational status: Mosque
- Governing body: Turkish-Islamic Union for Religious Affairs
- Status: Active

Location
- Location: Ehrenfeld, Cologne, North Rhine-Westphalia
- Country: Germany
- Interactive map of Cologne Central Mosque
- Coordinates: 50°56′44″N 6°55′42″E

Architecture
- Architects: Gottfried Böhm; Paul Böhm
- Type: Mosque
- Style: German Postmodern
- Completed: 2017
- Construction cost: €17-20 million

Specifications
- Capacity: 4,000 worshippers
- Interior area: 4,500 m^{2} (48,000 sq ft)
- Dome: 1
- Minaret: 2
- Minaret height: 55 m (180 ft)
- Materials: Concrete; steel; glass

Website
- ditib.de (in German)

The Cologne Central Mosque (German: Zentralmoschee Köln, Turkish: Köln Merkez-Camii) is a mosque located in the Ehrenfeld neighbourhood of the city of Cologne, in North Rhine-Westphalia, Germany. Commissioned by the German branch of the Turkish-Islamic Union for Religious Affairs (known as Diyanet İşleri Türk İslam Birliği, and abbreviated as DİTİB), the large, representative central mosque (zentralmoschee) was completed in 2017 and inaugurated by Turkish President Erdogan. As the largest mosque in Germany with the capacity to accommodate up to 4,000 worshippers, prior to its construction, there was some local opposition to the project.

Inspired by the Neo-Ottoman architecture, the mosque was designed in a German Postmodern style with glass walls, two minarets and a dome. The mosque has a bazaar as well as other secular areas intended for interfaith interactions. The mosque is one of Europe's biggest mosques, and the largest mosque in Germany, and it has been criticized by some, particularly the height of the minarets.

== History ==
=== Criticism during the planning phase ===
The project was opposed by author Ralph Giordano, right-wingers, Jörg Uckermann, then local district's deputy mayor, criticized the project saying:

"We don't want to build a Turkish ghetto in Ehrenfeld. I know about Londonistan and I don't want that here."

— Jörg Uckermann

Markus Wiener of the far-right activist group Pro Cologne, expressed his fear that the Cologne mosque would empower the Muslim population too much.

On June 16, 2007, 200 people gathered in a protest organized by Pro Cologne against the mosque including representatives from the Austrian Freedom Party and the Belgian Vlaams Belang. Then district deputy mayor Uckermann seconded that he thought that many residents reject the mosque because they believe that Cologne is a "Christian city". Author Ralph Giordano stated that he opposed the project as the mosque would be "an expression of the creeping Islamization of our land", a "declaration of war", and that he wouldn't want to see women wearing headscarfs on German streets, likening their appearance to "human penguins". Henryk M. Broder, a journalist, disagrees with Giordano's metaphor but said that "A mosque is more than a church or a synagogue. It is a political statement." Giordano's remarks have turned the local dispute into a national debate about the place of Islam in Germany. and other prominent Germans criticized the project as well. District mayor Uckermann stated that Giordano's comments "broke down the wall. Before if you criticised this monstrous mosque you were a Nazi. But we have a problem with the integration of Muslims. It's a question of language and culture." (Note: Uckermann left the conservative CDU for right-wing Pro Cologne in 2008 after being voted out of office as the district's deputy mayor and reportedly facing party exclusion.)

The city's official for integration Marlis Bredehorst stated that "it is important that the Muslims here get dignified houses of prayer" and added that "two hundred years ago, the Protestants had to pray secretively in Catholic Cologne [...] that is something we can't imagine anymore today." The city's mayor, Fritz Schramma, who supports the project said that "For me, it is self-evident that the Muslims need to have a prestigious place of worship, but it bothers me when people have lived here for 35 years and they don't speak a single word of German." Christian leaders have taken similarly ambivalent stances: the Catholic Church has long supported the project, though recently Cardinal Joachim Meisner, Archbishop of Cologne, has been more cautious: when asked if he was afraid of the mosque, he said, "I don't want to say I'm afraid, but I have an uneasy feeling." He also stated that Turkey should allow its Christian minorities equivalent rights. He said the mosque would change the skyline of Cologne. Wolfgang Huber, Germany's top Protestant bishop, criticized the "male domination" he saw in Islam and said Muslims should be able to convert to Christianity without fearing reprisals and the penalty of death.

Public opinion seemed "guardedly supportive, with a majority of residents saying they favor it". A poll taken by a local newspaper among 500 Cologne residents showed that the project is supported by 63%, of whom 27% want its size to be reduced. A protest planned by Pro Cologne for September 20, 2008 was canceled by police at the last minute in the interest of public safety, after clashes between police and protestors.

=== Approval given ===
On August 28, 2008, the Cologne City Council approved construction of the mosque. All parties approved the mosque, except the Christian democrats (CDU), who were opposed. However, the CDU mayor, Fritz Schramma, approved the construction. Outside the hall, a group of 30 protesters demonstrated against the approval, while 100 demonstrated in favor of it.

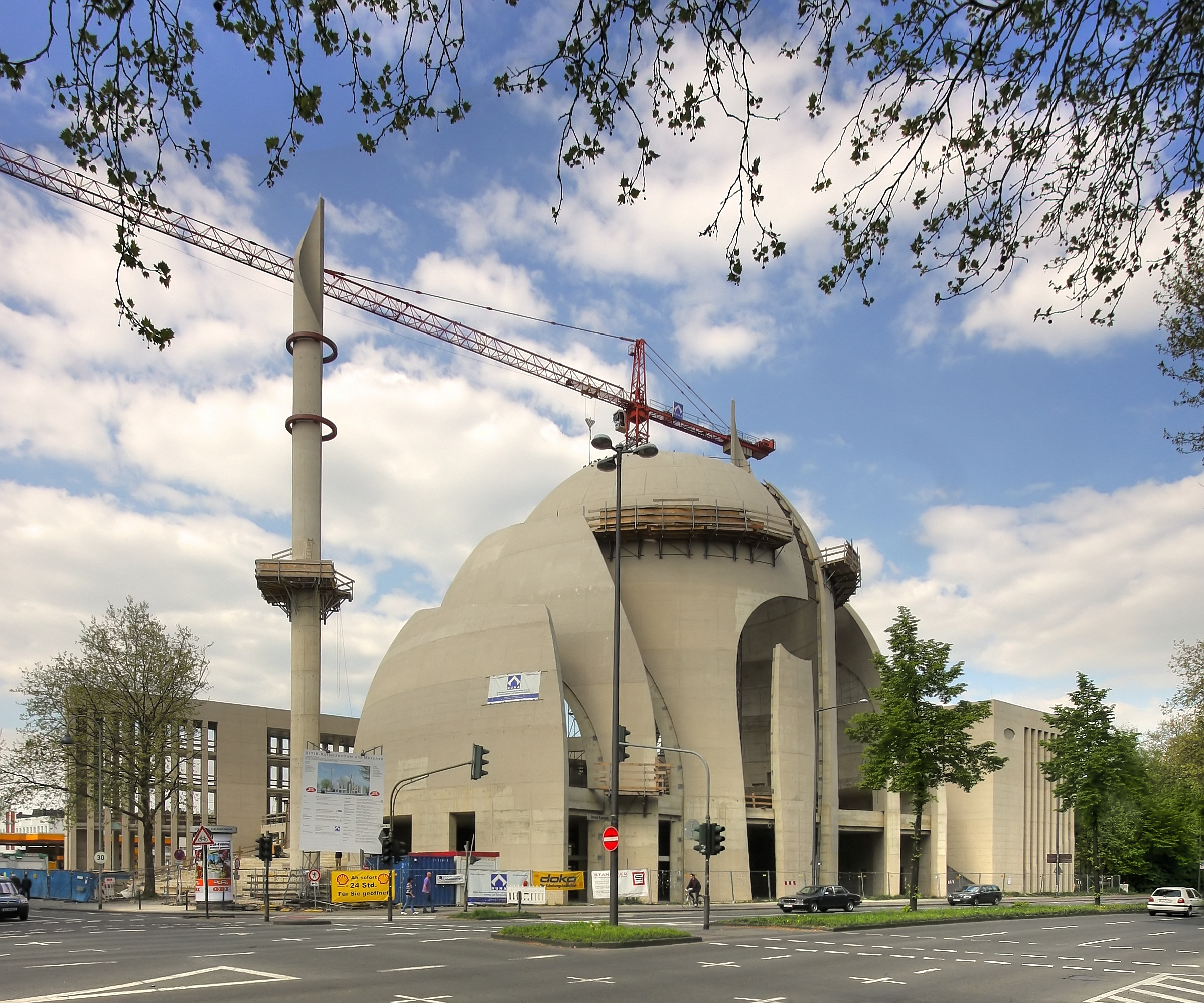
The mosque in April 2011, during its construction

The Cologne mosque project was contrasted with a less controversial project in Duisburg, Germany: in Duisburg, there was co-operation and good communication from an early stage between German politicians, church and community leaders and the developers of the mosque.

=== Opening ===
It was first used as a mosque in 2017. The inauguration of the mosque in September 2018 during the state visit to Germany by the Turkish President Recep Tayyip Erdoğan was controversial as the Turkish-Islamic Union for Religious Affairs neglected to provide a satisfying security concept for the event. Therefore Cologne permitted only 500 invited guests to the inauguration. DİTİB also failed to allow the mayor of Cologne Henriette Reker to deliver a speech at the inauguration, following which she declined to attend. Reker lamented the fact that the official inauguration took part in presence of Erdogan, as the mosque was in use for quite some time beforehand. It was interpreted that DİTİB was more an extension to the Turkish Government and the it was not interested in a cooperation with German institutions. Armin Laschet, the Minister President of North Rhine Westphalia also declined to attend.

=== Subsequent developments ===
In November 2023 the mosque came under criticism after a Taliban official who was invited to an event at the mosque had arrived in Germany without a visa.

== Architecture ==
Designed by Gottfried Böhm and his son, Paul, who specializes in building churches, the mosque was completed in 2017 in the German Postmodern style, inspired by Neo-Ottoman architecture. (Note: The design of the mosque is also considered "very German" because it is able to create a breakthrough in the field of architecture houses of worship that marries the architecture of the Ottoman-era Turkish mosque with a typical European-style architecture. Norbert Nussbaum, the head of architectural history at Cologne University, calls the mosque a "milestone for religious architecture in Germany." He says it is also distinctly Turkish. According to Nussbaum, "This is a building that could be located anywhere in the Turkish state. It has a particular shape that's found in Ottoman architecture. It's a Turkish mosque in the middle of the Islamic Diaspora...") The mosque cost £15–20 million (€17-20 million), funded by Diyanet İşleri Türk İslam Birliği (DİTİB), a branch of the Turkish government's religious affairs authority, bank loans, and donations from 884 Muslim associations. St. Theodore Catholic Church in Cologne also raised funds for the mosque.

With the capacity to accommodate 2,000 to 4,000 worshippers, the 4,500-square-metre (48,000 sq ft) mosque has a main hall of 36.5 square metres (393 sq ft), and two 55-metre-high (180 ft) minarets. The mosque has the bazaar and entrance on the ground floor, lecture halls in the basement, the prayer area on the upper floor and include a Muslim library. A well is placed in the centre to connect the two levels and create a pleasant atmosphere. The mosque consists of flat-like wall screens which form a dome in the centre.

It also has glass walls that, according to a DİTİB spokesman, gives visitors a feeling of openness. According to the architect, openness is further enhanced by an inviting staircase from the street. The developers have required that the secular areas of the mosque (e.g. the restaurant, event halls and stores) be open to people of all religions. A plan welcomed by then mayor of Cologne Fritz Schramma to build shorter minarets was dropped after the architects said the plan would leave the minarets out of proportion with the rest of the building and surrounding structures.

== Gallery ==
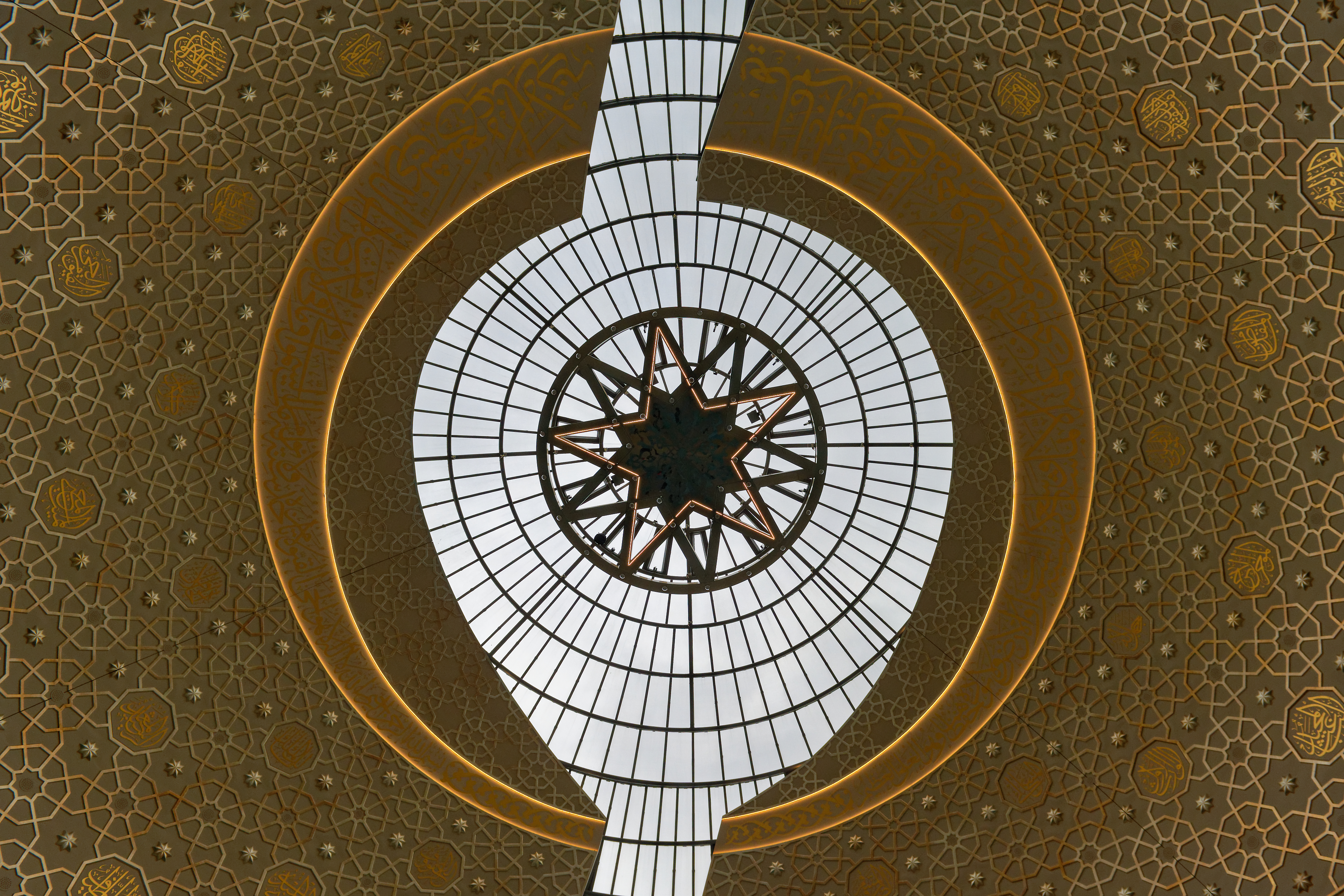

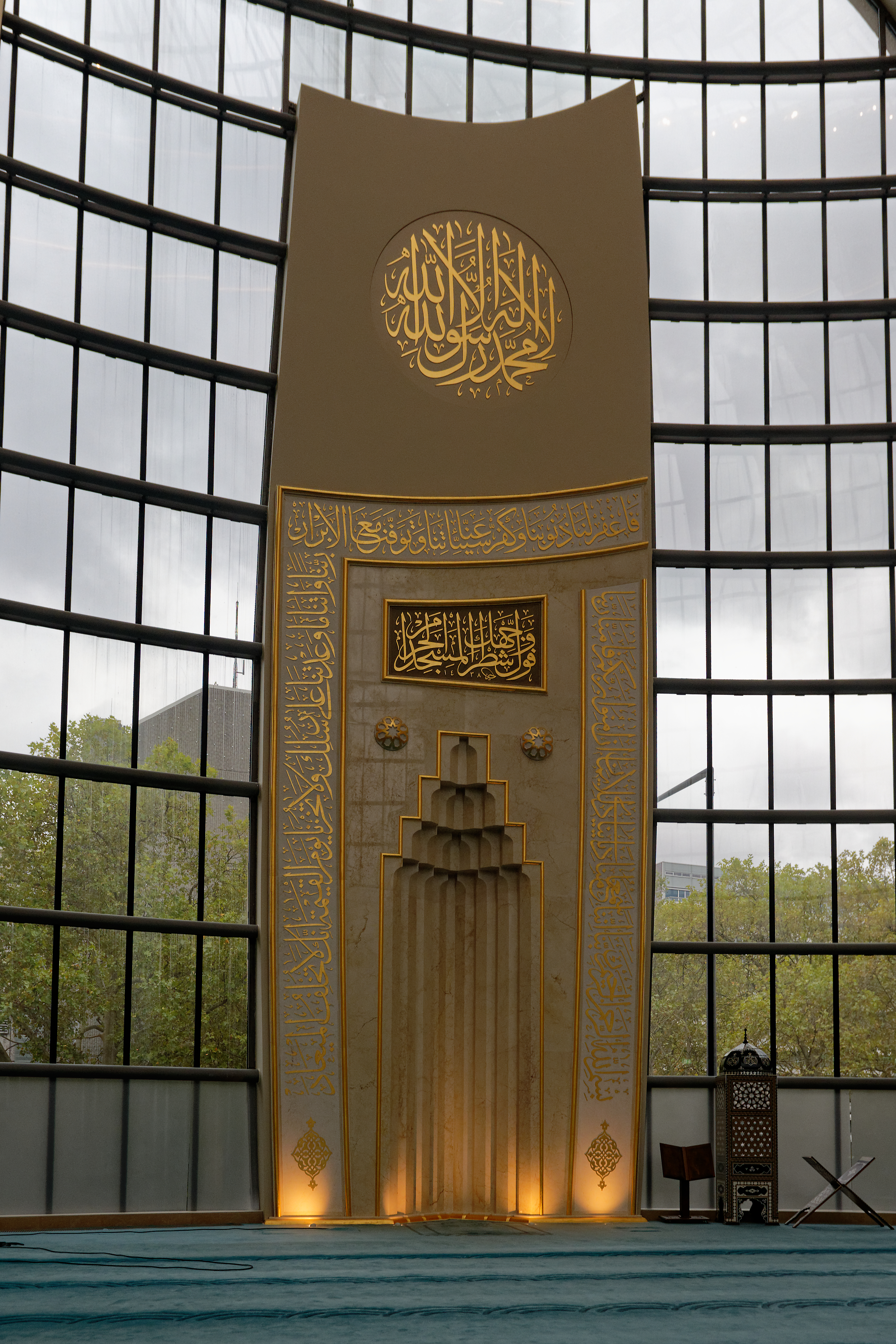

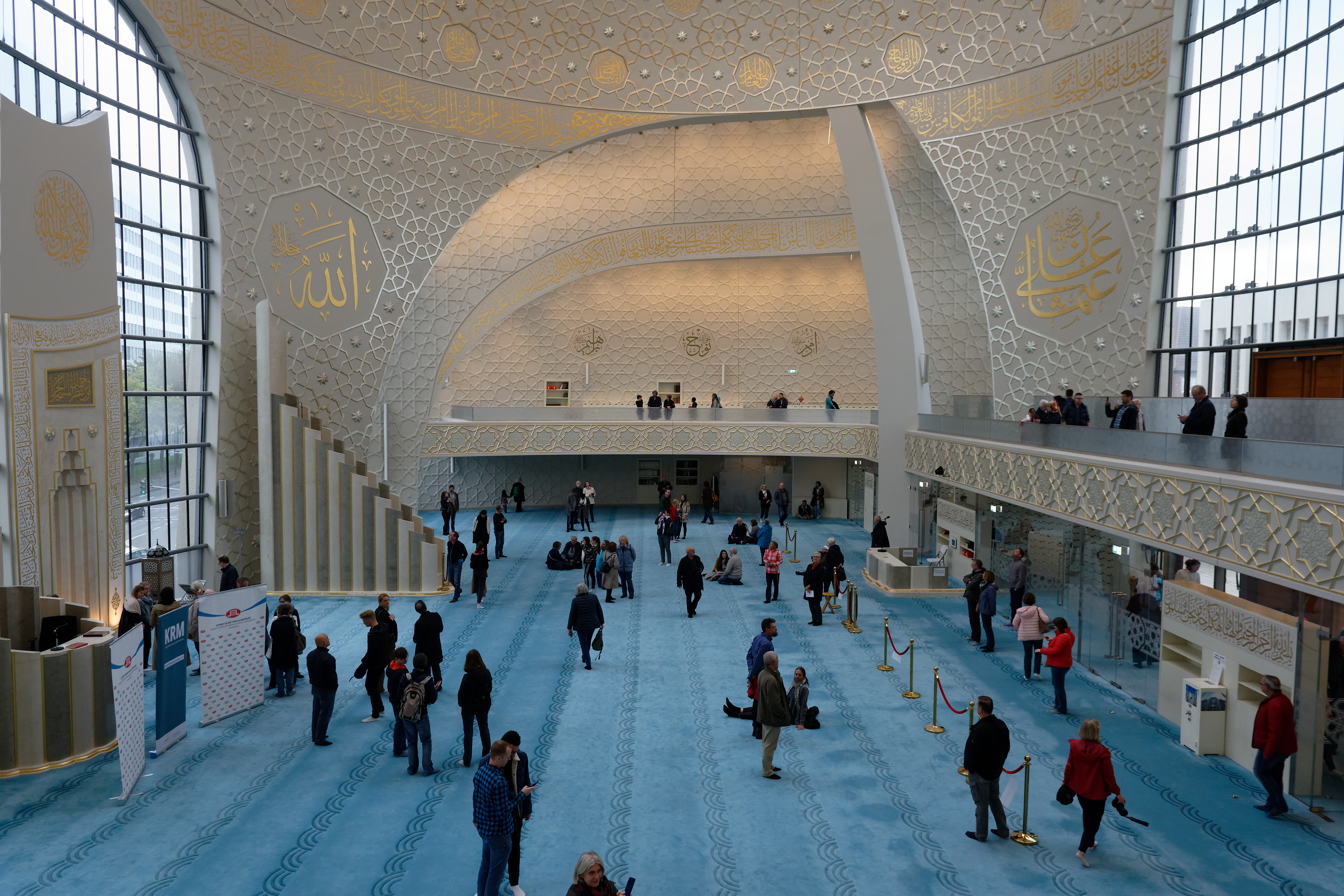

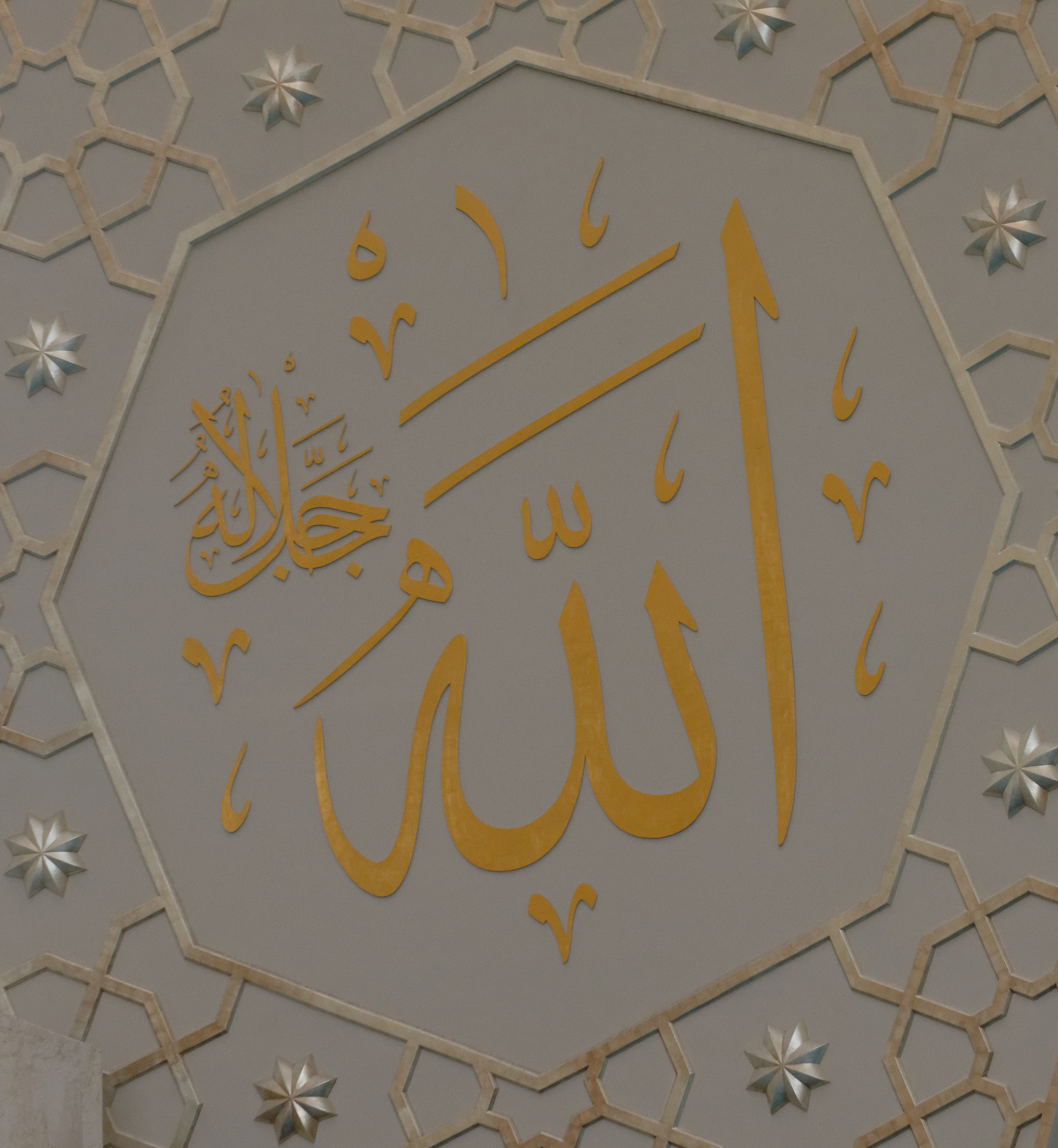

== See also ==
- Controversies related to Islam and Muslims
- Islam in Germany
- List of mosques in Germany
