= Maria, Königin des Friedens =

Pilgrimage church

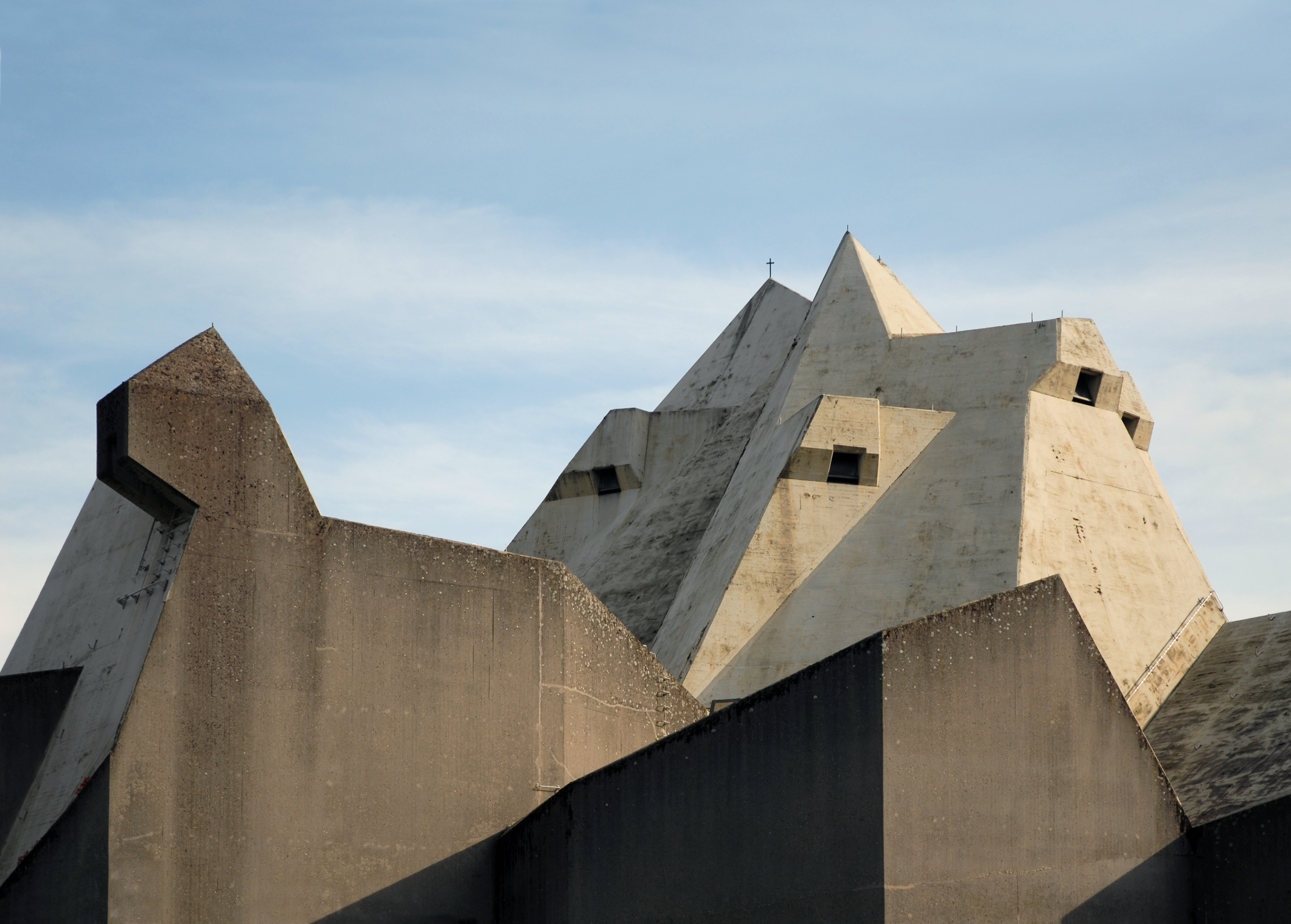
- Exterior

Religion
- Affiliation: Catholic
- Province: Diocese of Cologne
- Ecclesiastical or organizational status: Pilgrimage and parish church
- Year consecrated: 22 May 1968

Location
- Location: Velbert-Neviges, North Rhine-Westphalia, Germany
- Interactive map of Maria, Königin des Friedens
- Coordinates: 51°18′46″N 07°05′15″E

Architecture
- Architect: Gottfried Böhm
- Style: Brutalist
- Completed: 1968

Website
- www.mariendom.de

Maria, Königin des Friedens (Mary, Queen of Peace) is a pilgrimage church and parish in Neviges, part of Velbert, North Rhine-Westphalia, Germany. The pilgrimage dates back to 1676. Neviges was the home of a Franciscan monastery from 1675 until the end of 2019. A church dedicated to the Immaculate Conception in 1728 became too small for the growing numbers of pilgrims in the 20th century.

Inspired by the Second Vatican Council, Cardinal Josef Frings of Cologne was open to a radically new church building. Gottfried Böhm designed a building in brutalist style that won the cardinal's approval. It was consecrated in 1968, and also became known as the Mariendom and Wallfahrtsdom. It is the second largest church in the Diocese of Cologne, after Cologne Cathedral. It is also the second largest church north of the Alps. The concrete structure with an irregular roof and an interior like a forum became the architect's signature building, and is regarded as one of the important "spatial creations" in 20th-century architecture.

== History of the pilgrimage ==
The place of the pilgrimage to Neviges was an apparition of Mary to the Franciscan friar Antonius Schirley in 1676. He performed his daily prayer before a small painting of Mary, when he heard a voice saying "Take me to the Hardenberg, I wish to be worshiped there!" ("Bring mich nach Hardenberg, da will ich verehrt sein!"). Schirley delivered the painting of Mary to a chapel in Hardenberg-Neviges. In 1681, Ferdinand von Fürstenberg, who had been severely ill and was healed, made a pilgrimage of thanks to Neviges. This was the beginning of the pilgrimage. In 1688, the Vicar General of the Diocese of Cologne officially sanctioned the pilgrimage, dedicated to the Immaculate Conception of Mary. It was a decidedly counter-Reformation dedication in a mostly Protestant area.

Neviges was home to a Franciscan monastery from 1675, which operated the pilgrimage until the end of 2019. A small new parish church was dedicated to the Immaculate Conception in 1728. It became too small for the growing number, and after World War I, several plans for a new church were made but not carried out. After World War II, 300,000 pilgrims arrived each year, at times 10,000 on a single Sunday. A larger church was needed.

== Church ==
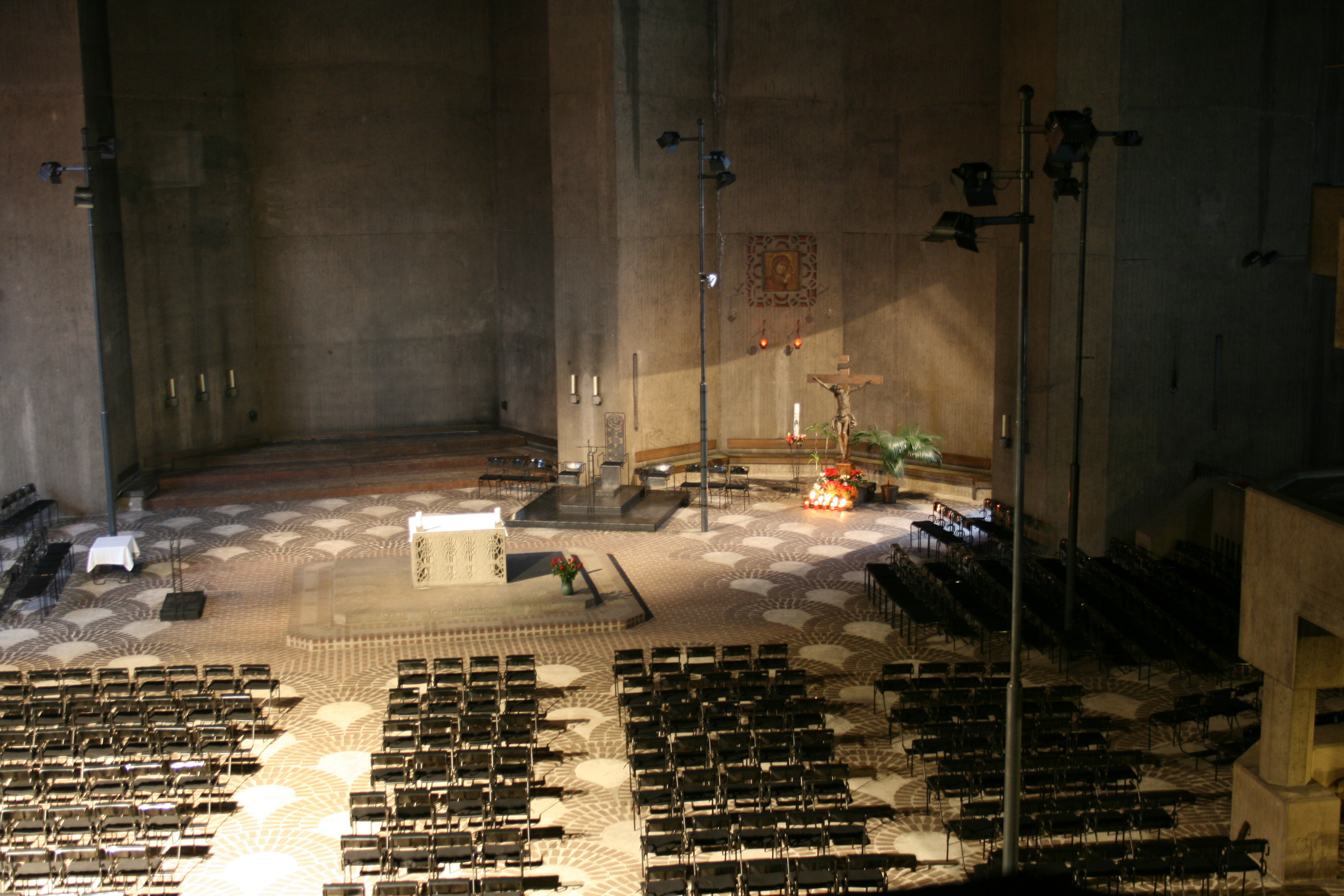
Interior

The archbishop of Cologne, Cardinal Josef Frings, had attended the Second Vatican Council, which developed concepts about a congregation participating in the liturgy. He tried to introduce the ideas in his diocese, and saw the chance for a radically different church realising the new approach and large enough to hold the many pilgrims.

Gottfried Böhm, an architect of many churches, designed a church for the Neviges site in 1963 and entered an international competition as one of 17 architects. He failed to win in a first round. Cardinal Frings was disappointed by the result of the competition. Böhm presented a revised model to the cardinal, who was then almost blind but could experience the model by touch and ultimately favoured it. Böhm won the commission in June 1964, and construction began in 1966. The church was consecrated on 22 May 1968. It is, after the Cologne Cathedral, the second-largest church in the diocese, with room for 6,000 visitors.

The church is a concrete building in brutalist style, with a concrete roof that has been compared to tents, crystals, a rock and a town. The complex is reminiscent of an abstract cubist sculpture. The entrance hall, with a low ceiling, is kept dark, to make the altar, illuminated through large stained-glass windows, the brightest place. The floor plan shows a curved approach from the entrance opening towards the altar. The interior is intended to resemble a market place, following concepts of the Second Vatican Council. It was a radical transition from elaborately decorated churches with a separation of altar and congregation. Intimate rooms are available for private devotion: the Gnadenkapelle (Chapel of Grace) with the image of Mary, the Sakramentskapelle (Chapel of the Sacraments), and the Unterkirche (Lower Church) below the main hall.

== Features ==
Rose Window

Böhm also designed the large windows, such as the green Schlangenfenster (Snake Window) and the red Rosenfenster (Rose Window), the rose being a repeated motif throughout the building. The Mariensäule (Mary's Column) holding the image of Mary, the altar and a high tabernacle housing the Eucharist were designed by Elmar Hillebrand, a sculptor from Cologne.

The church first had an electronic organ. A pipe organ was consecrated in May 2010. It was first built in 1976 by Stockmann organ builders from Werl, Germany, for the Antoniuskirche in Hildesheim. It was transferred to Neviges in 2010 by Orgelbau Seifert from Kevelaer and expanded to include an additional six stops.

== Reception ==
The architect became internationally known by the building of the Neviges church, which was discussed already during the building phase, similar to his father's church of St. Engelbert in Cologne 30 years earlier. The Neviges church and the town hall of Bensberg, which was built at the same time, are regarded as his most mature concrete buildings, and were the basis for awarding him the Pritzker Prize for architecture. The architect realised the liturgical reform towards community, participation and transparency in the service (Gemeinschaft, Mitwirkung und Transparenz im Gottesdienst). The Neviges church became Böhm's signature piece. It has been regarded as one of the important "spatial creations" in 20th-century architecture.
