= Gottfried Böhm =

German architect and sculptor (1920–2021)

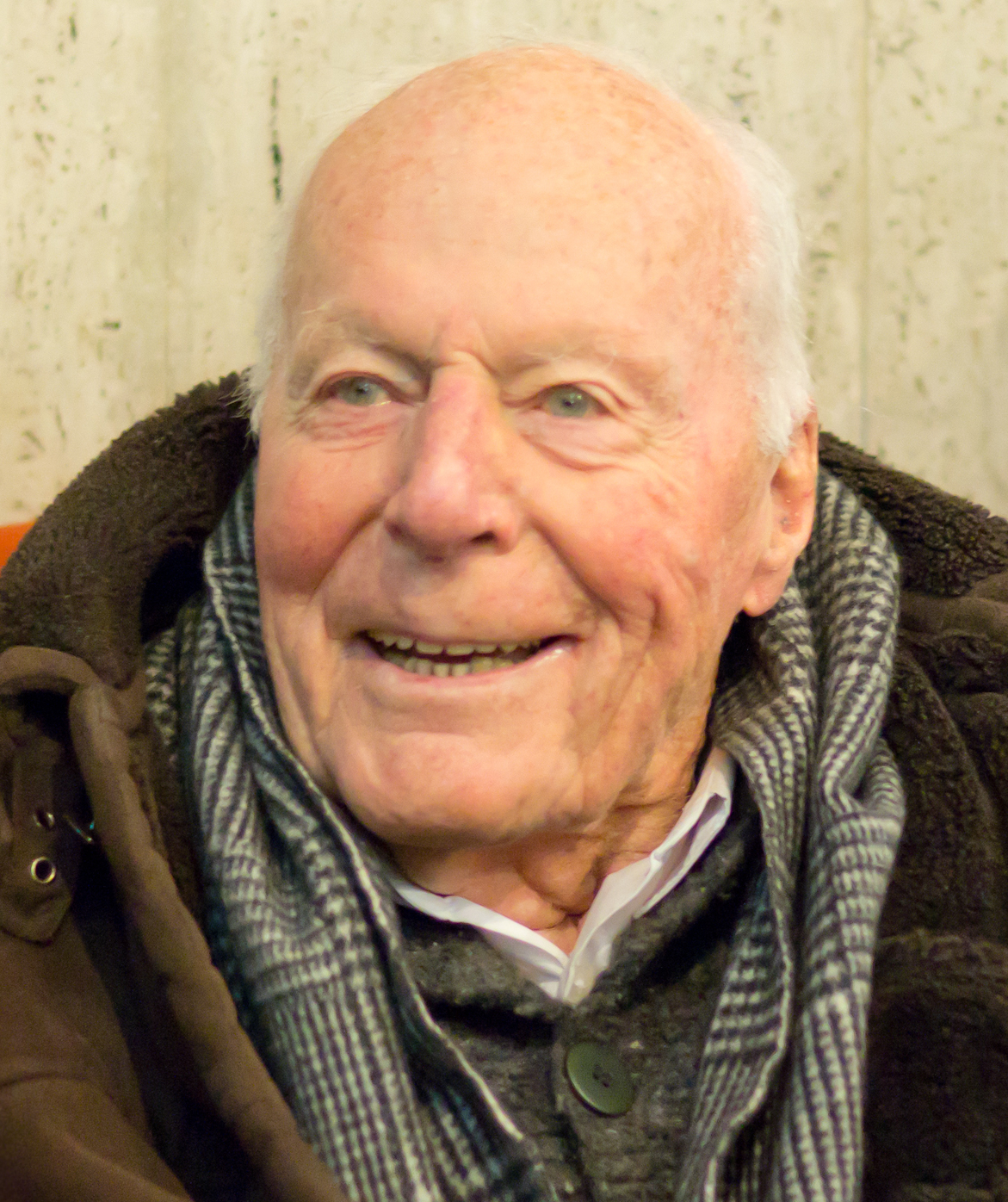
- Böhm in 2015
- Born: 23 January 1920; Offenbach am Main, Hesse, Germany
- Died: 9 June 2021 (aged 101); Cologne, North Rhine-Westphalia, Germany
- Education: Technische Hochschule, Munich
- Occupation: Architect
- Awards: Pritzker Prize
- Buildings: Maria, Königin des Friedens in Neviges; Bensberg City Hall

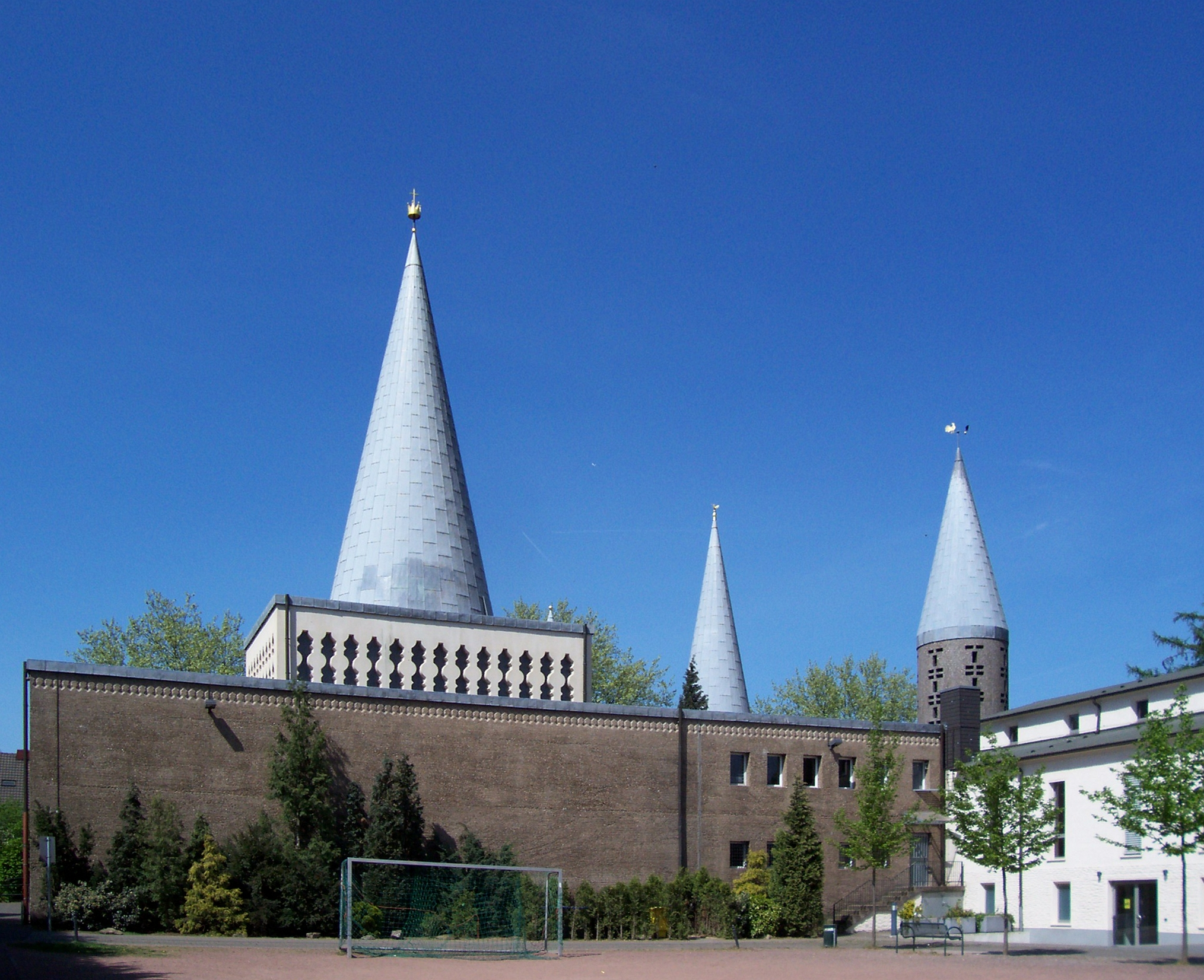
1960 Herz-Jesu-Kirche, Bergisch Gladbach

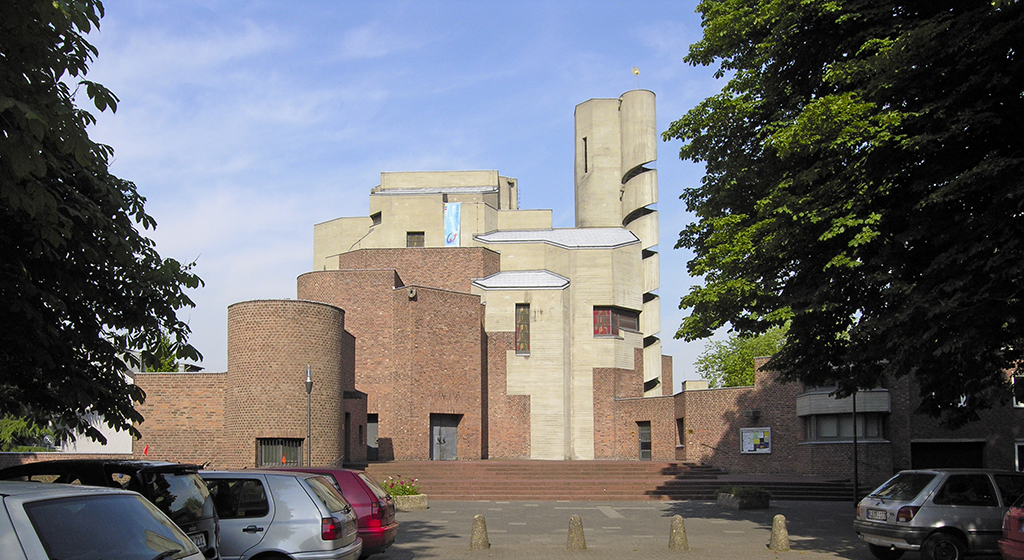
Böhm's 1968 Iglesia Youth Center Library, Cologne

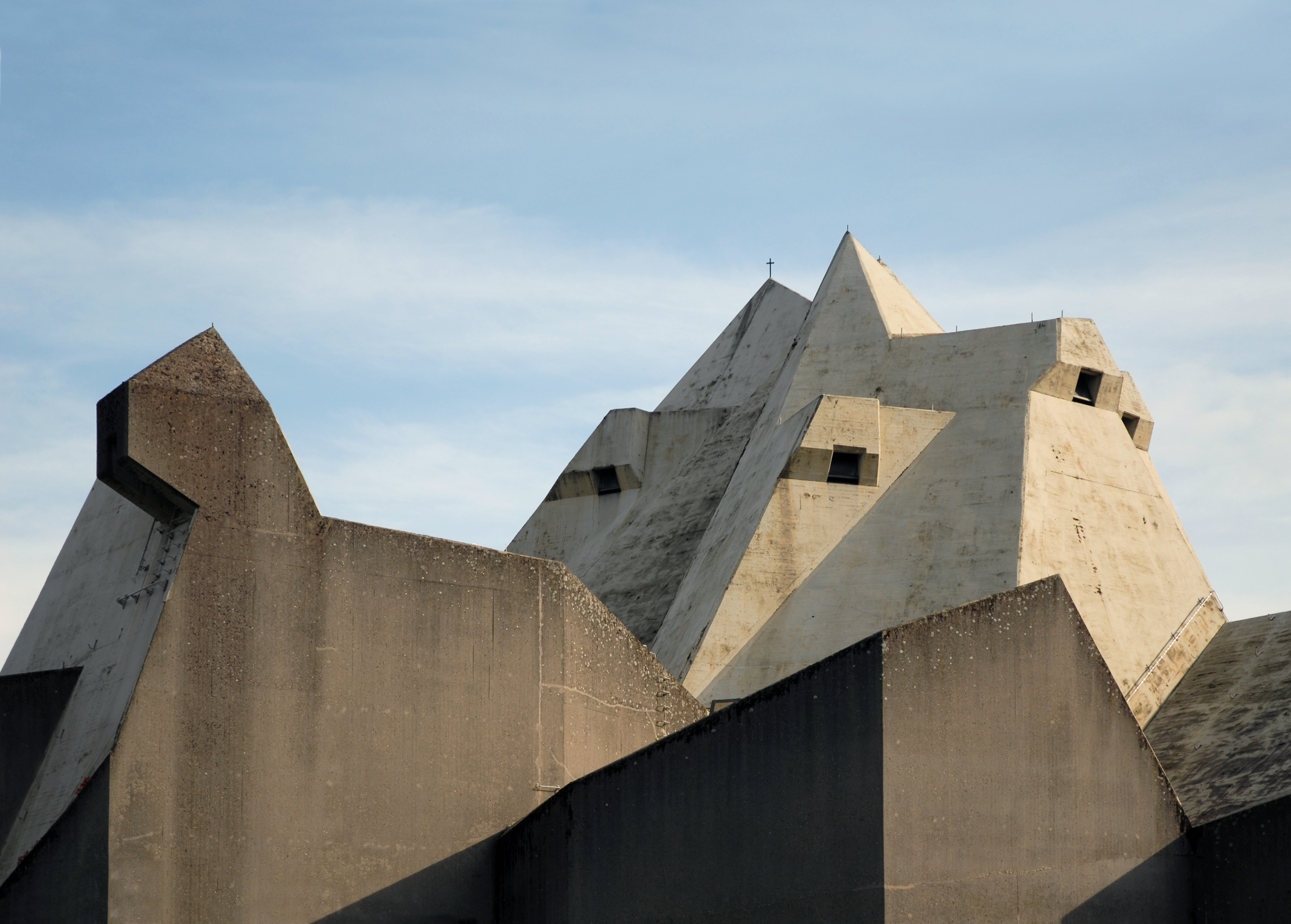
Maria, Königin des Friedens pilgrimage church, Neviges, Germany

Gottfried Böhm (pronounced [ˈɡɔtfʁiːt ˈbøːm]; 23 January 1920 – 9 June 2021) was a German architect and sculptor. His reputation is based on creating highly sculptural buildings made of concrete, steel, and glass. Böhm's first independent building was the Cologne chapel "Madonna in the Rubble" (now integrated into Peter Zumthor's design of the Kolumba museum renovation). The chapel was completed in 1949 where a medieval church once stood before it was destroyed during World War II. Böhm's most influential and recognized building is the Maria, Königin des Friedens pilgrimage church in Neviges.

In 1986, he became the first German architect to be awarded the prestigious Pritzker Prize. Among the most recently completed construction projects involving Böhm are the Hans Otto Theater in Potsdam (2006) and the Cologne Central Mosque, completed in 2018.

In honor of Gottfried Böhm, the City of Cologne has been awarding the Gottfried Böhm Scholarship for postgraduate architects together with the Technische Hochschule Köln and the Verein der Freunde & Förderer der Technischen Hochschule Köln e.V. since 2023.

== Early life ==
Böhm was born in Offenbach am Main near Frankfurt on 23 January 1920. He was the youngest of three children of Maria and Dominikus Böhm. His father was renowned for his numerous avant-garde churches throughout Germany, many in Expressionist style. His grandfather was also an architect. Böhm was conscripted into the Wehrmacht at the outset of World War II. He served until he was injured in 1942 during Operation Barbarossa and consequently returned to Germany. After graduating from the Technische Hochschule, Munich, in 1946, he studied sculpture at a nearby fine-arts academy. Gottfried later integrated his clay model making skills acquired during this time at the academy into his design process.

== Career ==
After graduating in 1947, Gottfried worked for his father until the latter's death in 1955, and later took over his firm. During this period, he also worked with the "Society for the Reconstruction of Cologne" under Rudolf Schwarz. In 1951, he traveled to New York City and worked for six months in the architectural firm of Cajetan Baumann. While traveling in the United States he met two of his greatest inspirations, German architects Ludwig Mies van der Rohe and Walter Gropius.

In the following decades, Böhm constructed many buildings around Germany, including museums, civic centers, office buildings, homes, apartment buildings and churches. He is considered to have been both an expressionist and post-Bauhaus architect, but he preferred to define himself as an architect who created "connections" between the past and the future, between the world of ideas and the physical world, between a building and its urban surroundings. In this vein, Böhm always envisioned the color, form, and materials of a building in relationship with its setting. His earlier projects were done mostly in molded concrete, but more recently he employed more steel and glass in his buildings due to the technical advancements in both materials. His concern for urban planning is evident in many of his projects, harping back to his emphasis on "connections". In addition to Germany, Böhm designed buildings in Los Angeles, Tokyo, and Turin, Italy.

A 2014 documentary titled "Concrete Love – The Böhm Family" explores Gottfried's relationship with his sons and his wife.

== Personal life ==
Böhm was married to Elizabeth Haggenmüller, also an architect, until her death in 2012. He met her in 1948 while studying in Munich. She assisted him in several of his projects, mainly through interior design. Together, they had four sons: Stephan, Peter, Paul and Markus. The first three also became architects, while Markus worked as a painter. Böhm turned 100 in January 2020.

Böhm died on the night of 9 June 2021 at his home in Cologne, aged 101. The cause of death was not disclosed.

== Gottfried Böhm Scholarship ==
On the occasion of the 100th birthday of Cologne architect Gottfried Böhm, Cologne Mayor Henriette Reker proposed a scholarship in 2020 in honor of the internationally renowned architect. In 2023, the scholarship was awarded for the first time.

The Gottfried Böhm Scholarship supports architects in the postgraduate phase who are particularly interested in the connection between architecture and urban development. Under the patronage of Cologne's mayor Henriette Reker the one-year residency scholarship takes place in the metropolis of Cologne. The scholarship holder is given the opportunity to work for one year on creative and visionary tasks in architecture and urban development for Cologne and its periphery. For this period he or she will receive free accommodation, a workplace in a creative environment in the heart of the city and a monthly grant totaling 2,500 euros. The scholarship is offered and supervised by the Verein der Freunde und Förderer der Technischen Hochschule Köln e.V. (Association of Friends and Sponsors of the Cologne University of Applied Sciences).

Postgraduate architects can apply. The current application phase runs until 31 May 2025. The scholarship starts in October 2025 and runs for one year.

== Notable buildings ==
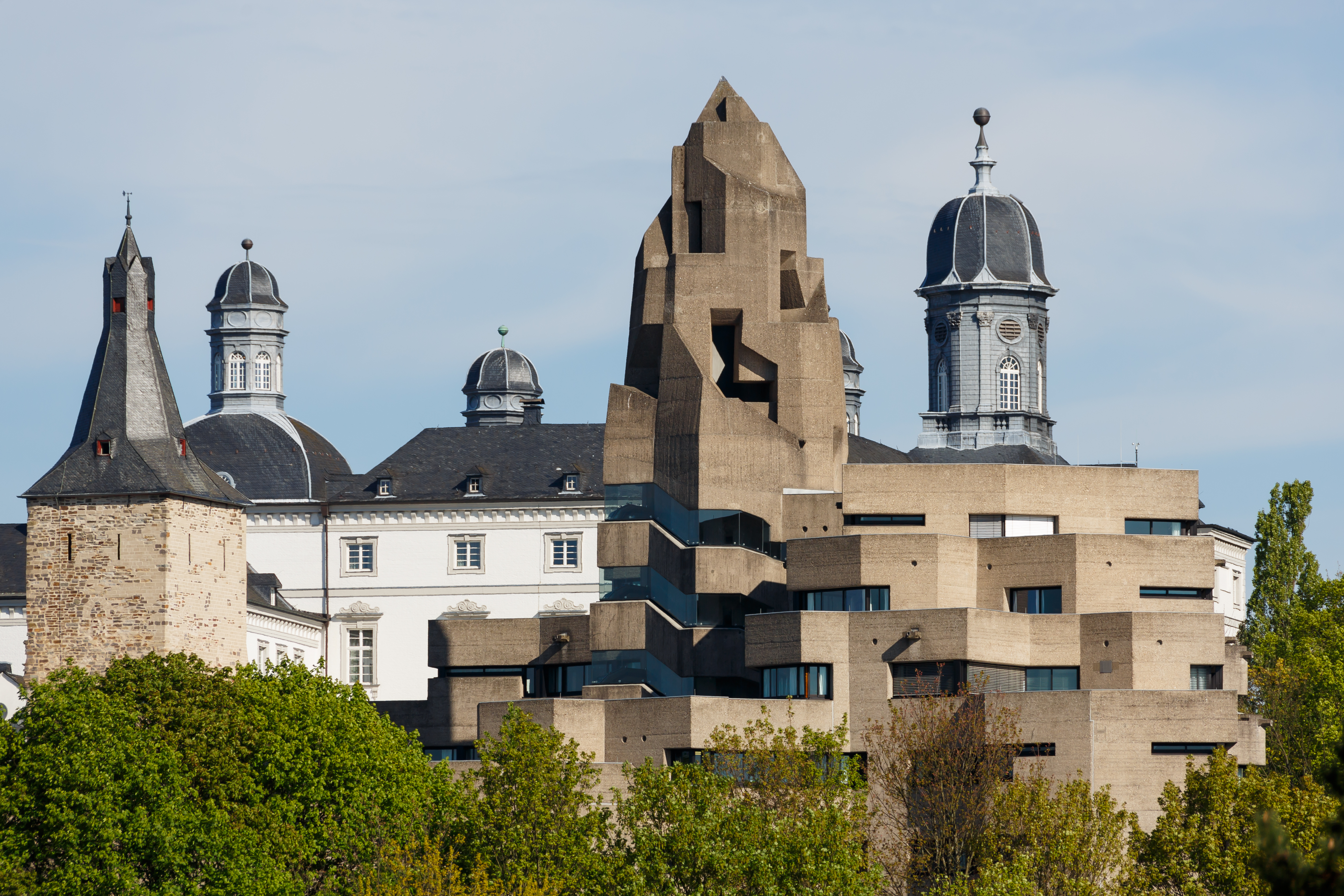
Bensberg City Hall, seen against old castle

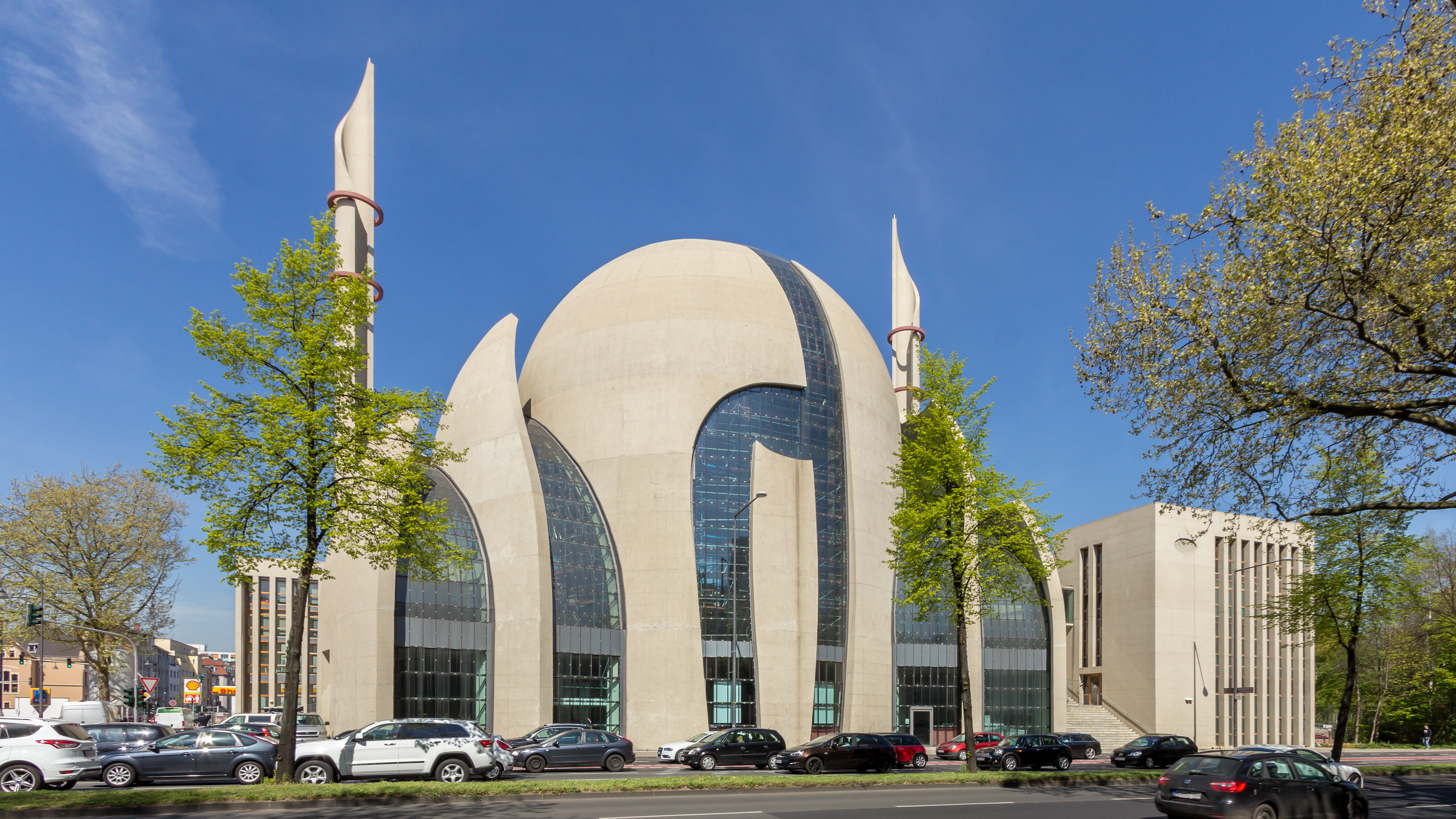
2017 Cologne Central Mosque

- 1947–50 St. Kolumba, Cologne
- 1962–69 Bensberg City Hall
- 1962-65 St. Gertrud, Cologne
- 1968–72 Maria, Königin des Friedens pilgrimage church, Neviges
- 1968–70 Christi Auferstehung (Church of Resurrection), Cologne

== Awards ==
- 1968 – Eduard-von-der-Heydt Prize from the city of Wuppertal
- 1971 – Architecture Prize of the Association of German Architects, Düsseldorf
- 1974 – Berlin Art Prize of the Academy of Arts, Berlin
- 1975 – Großer BDA Preis (BDA Grand Award) of the Association of German Architects, Bonn
- 1977 – Honorary Professor F. Villareal National University, Lima, Peru
- 1982 – Grande Medaille d'Or d'Architecture, L'Académie d'Architecture in Paris, France
- 1983 – Honorary Membership / Honorary Member of the American Institute of Architects AIA
- 1985 – Fritz Schumacher Prize, Hamburg
- 1985 – Honorary doctorate, Technical University of Munich
- 1985/1986 – Price Cret Chair at the University of Pennsylvania, Philadelphia, Pennsylvania, United States
- 1986 – Pritzker Architecture Prize, Chicago, US
- 1987 – Gebhard Fugel Prize, Munich
- 1993 – Rheinischer Kulturpreis

== See also ==
- List of architects
