= Christi Auferstehung (Lindenthal) =

Coordinates: 50.9352°N 6.9165°E

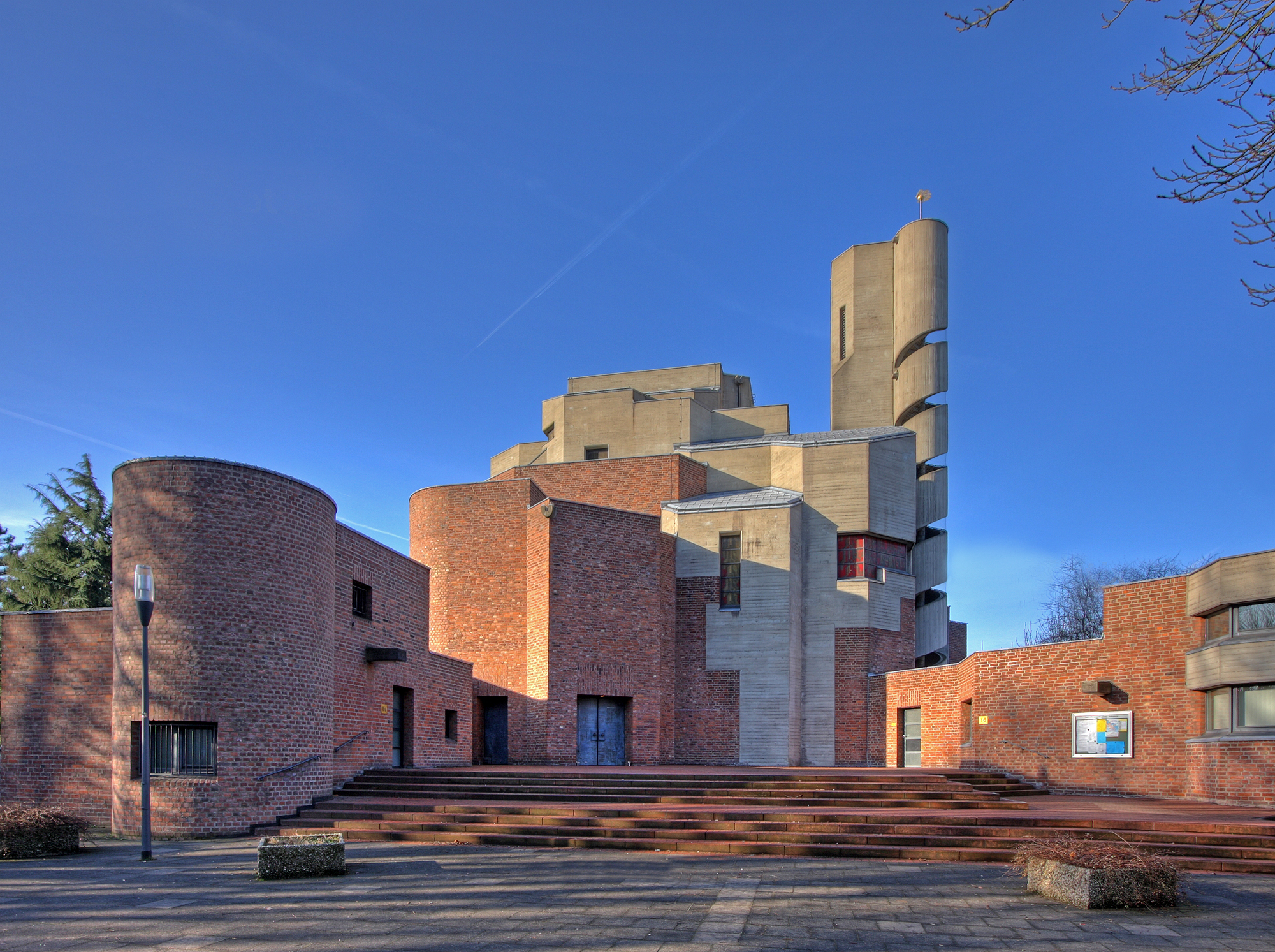
Christi Auferstehung in 2008

Christi Auferstehung is a Catholic church in the district of Lindenthal in Cologne, Germany. It was built from 1968 to 1970 according to plans by the architect Gottfried Böhm and consecrated in 1971.
