= Dominikus Böhm =

German architect (1880–1955)

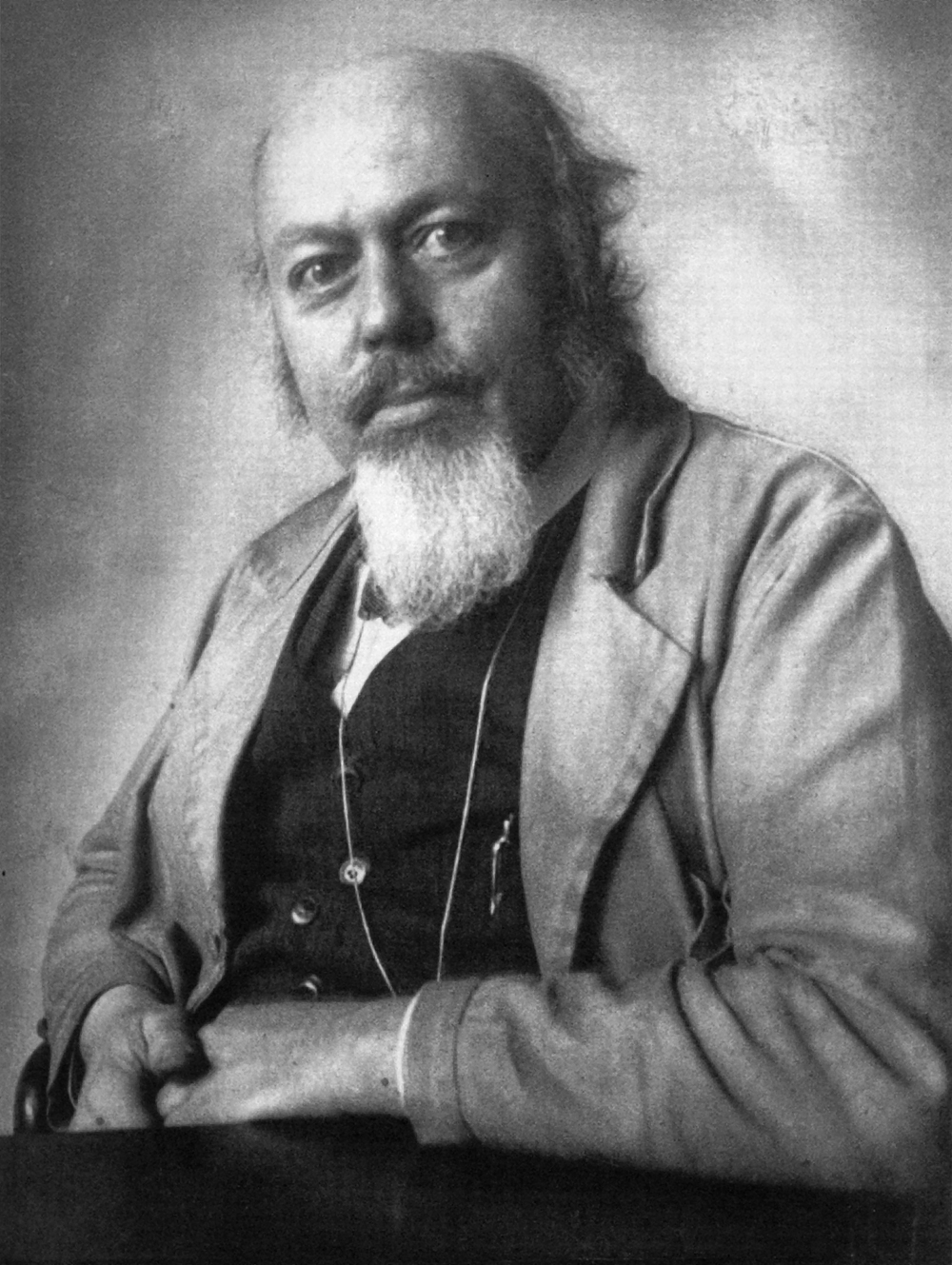
- Dominikus Böhm, by Hugo Schmölz
- Born: 23 October 1880; Jettingen, Germany
- Died: 6 August 1955 (aged 74); Cologne, Germany
- Occupation: architect
- Known for: architect of churches in Germany
- Children: Gottfried Böhm
- Parent(s): Alois and Katharina Böhm (nee Hofmiller)

Dominikus Böhm (23 October 1880 – 6 August 1955) was a German architect specializing in churches. He built churches in Cologne, the Ruhr area, Swabia, and Hesse. Many of his buildings are examples of Brick Expressionism.

== Life and career ==
Böhm was born in Jettingen as the youngest of six children to builder and major Alois Böhm and his wife Katharina (née Hofmiller).

He studied at the Augsburg University of Applied Sciences and graduated in 1900. He became a teacher at the Hochschule für Gestaltung Offenbach from 1908 to 1926. He also attended lectures by Theodor Fischer at the University of Stuttgart.

He worked with several partners, including Martin Weber and Rudolf Schwarz, designing and constructing churches.

He first taught at the Rheinische Technicum in Bingen, and then from 1908 to 1926 at what is now the College of Design in Offenbach, with the architect Rudolf Schwarz in a joint workshop.

In 1926, Böhm became professor for Christian art under Richard Riemerschmid at the Kölner Werkschulen in Cologne. His works, including the Christ the King church (Christkönigskirche) in Bischofsheim, polarized between support (e.g. by the art historian August Hoff) and rejection (e.g. Michael von Faulhaber).

During World War II he became (through his membership in the Block Kölner Baukünstler) member of the NSDAP, but never engaged in construction for the government. While he was reluctant to sign his personal correspondence with the prescribed party greetings, he was willing to compete for government commissions alongside architects like Walter Gropius and Mies van der Rohe. Four of his largest churches were built during the reign of the Third Reich. He enjoyed high standing within Nazi Germany, demonstrated by the fact that in 1943 he was the subject of one of the last architectural monographs published before the end of the war. His church designs took inspiration from the communal emphasis of Guardini's theology; however his architectural aesthetic and personal behaviour cannot deny the political ramifications of the ideas to which he sought to give built form. After the war, he retook his position in Cologne, and constructed eight new churches in the massively damaged city.

He was awarded the Federal Cross of Merit in 1950, and the Order of St. Sylvester in 1952.

Böhm died in Cologne, where he was buried on 10 August 1955.

== Architectural expression and legacy ==
Böhm took advantage of modern building materials and techniques. By reducing the form of the church to its essential shape, the lighting of the altar and the sophisticated design of the altar, he created a new tradition of modern church architecture. In particular, he treated light as if it were a building material, and as part of the liturgy.

Böhm also considered liturgical questions which may have indirectly influenced the doctrine of the Second Vatican Council. His special merit was his belief in the participation of the community in worship, using the structure of early church buildings as a model. His churches are characterized by simple monumentality and especially by the new emphasis on the centrally located altar area.

Stained glass was one of his passions. He designed the stained glass windows, built for Holy Ghost Church in Brunswick-Lehndorf in 1952. He also served as a musician and composer, and composed numerous songs and sacred music. The postmodern architect Heinz Bienefeld began his career as his assistant.

Part of his legacy is preserved at the German Architecture Museum in Frankfurt, while another part was located in the Historical Archive of the City of Cologne but was probably lost in the collapse of the archive building on 3 March 2009.

He was the father of architect Gottfried Böhm.

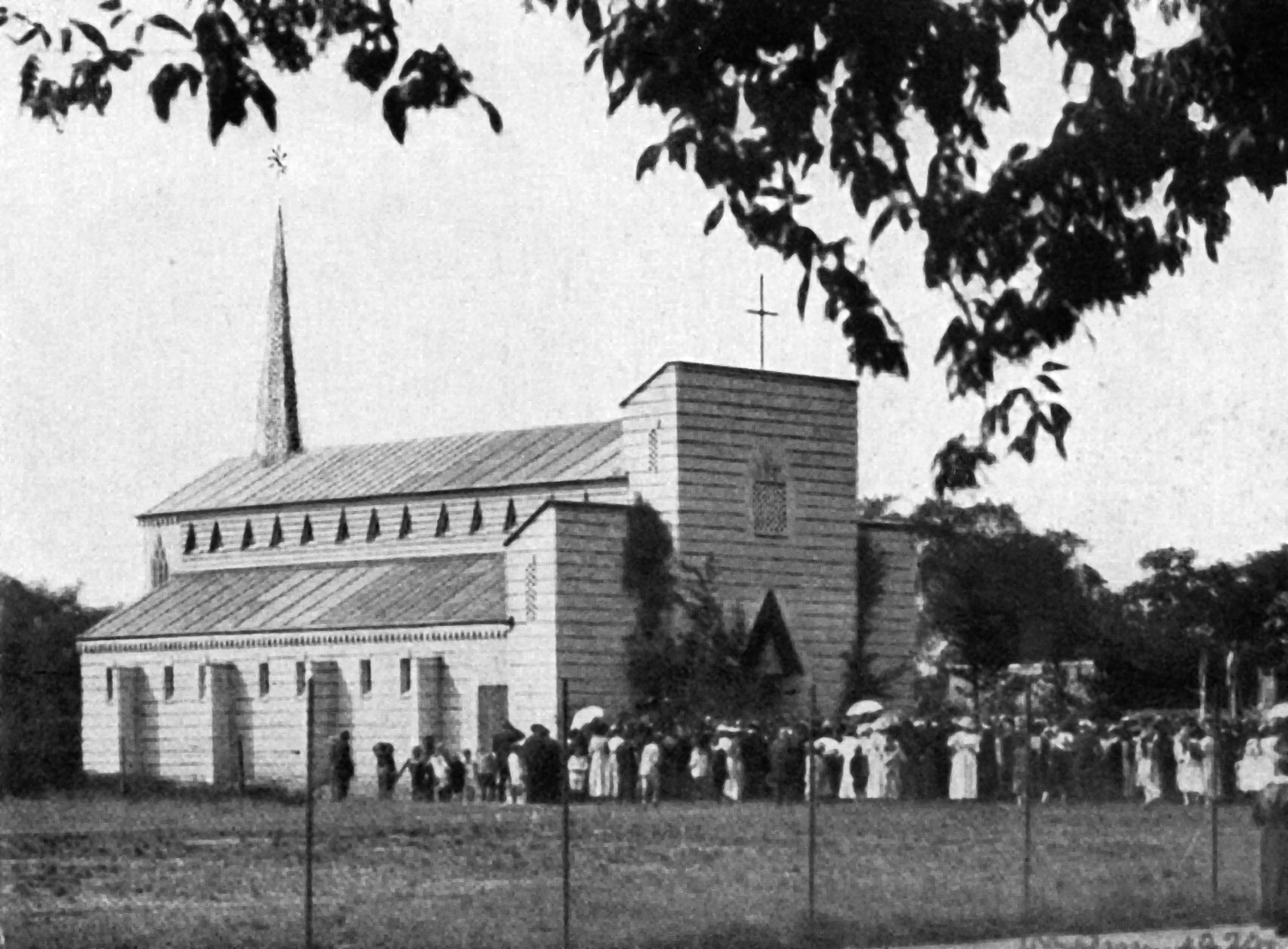
Böhms first church: St. Josef in Offenbach

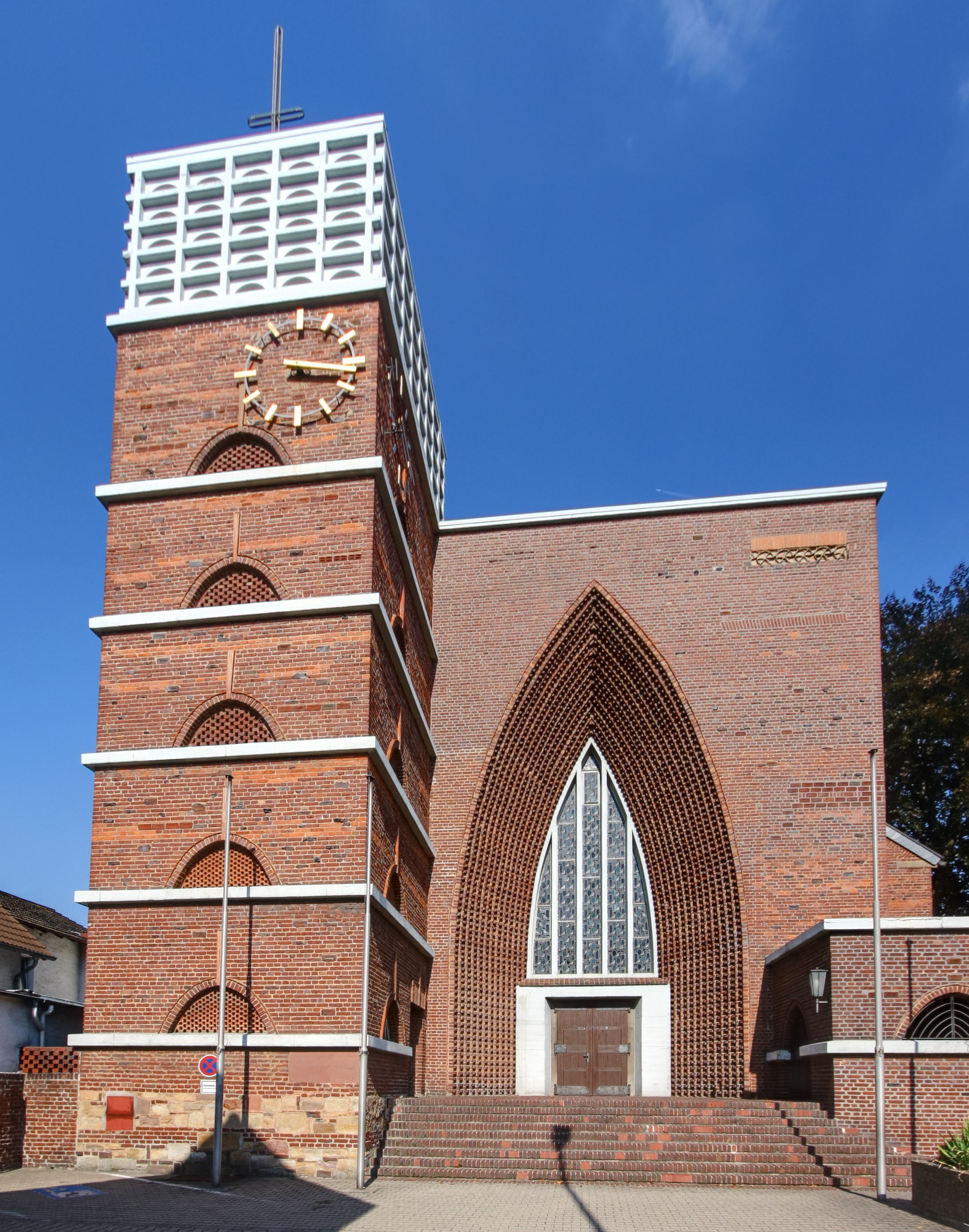
Christkönig in Bischofsheim, 1925

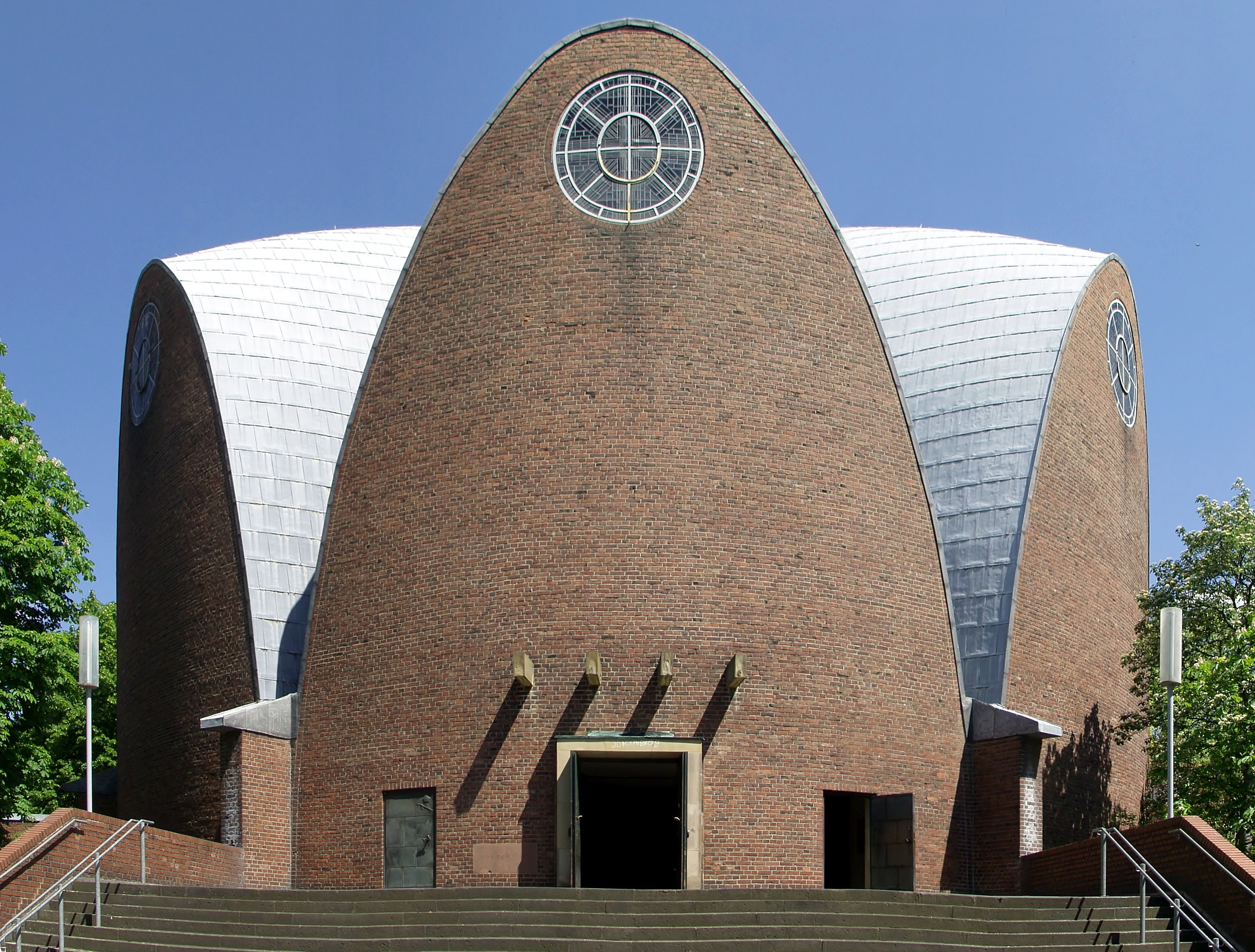
St. Engelbert in Cologne, 1928−1932

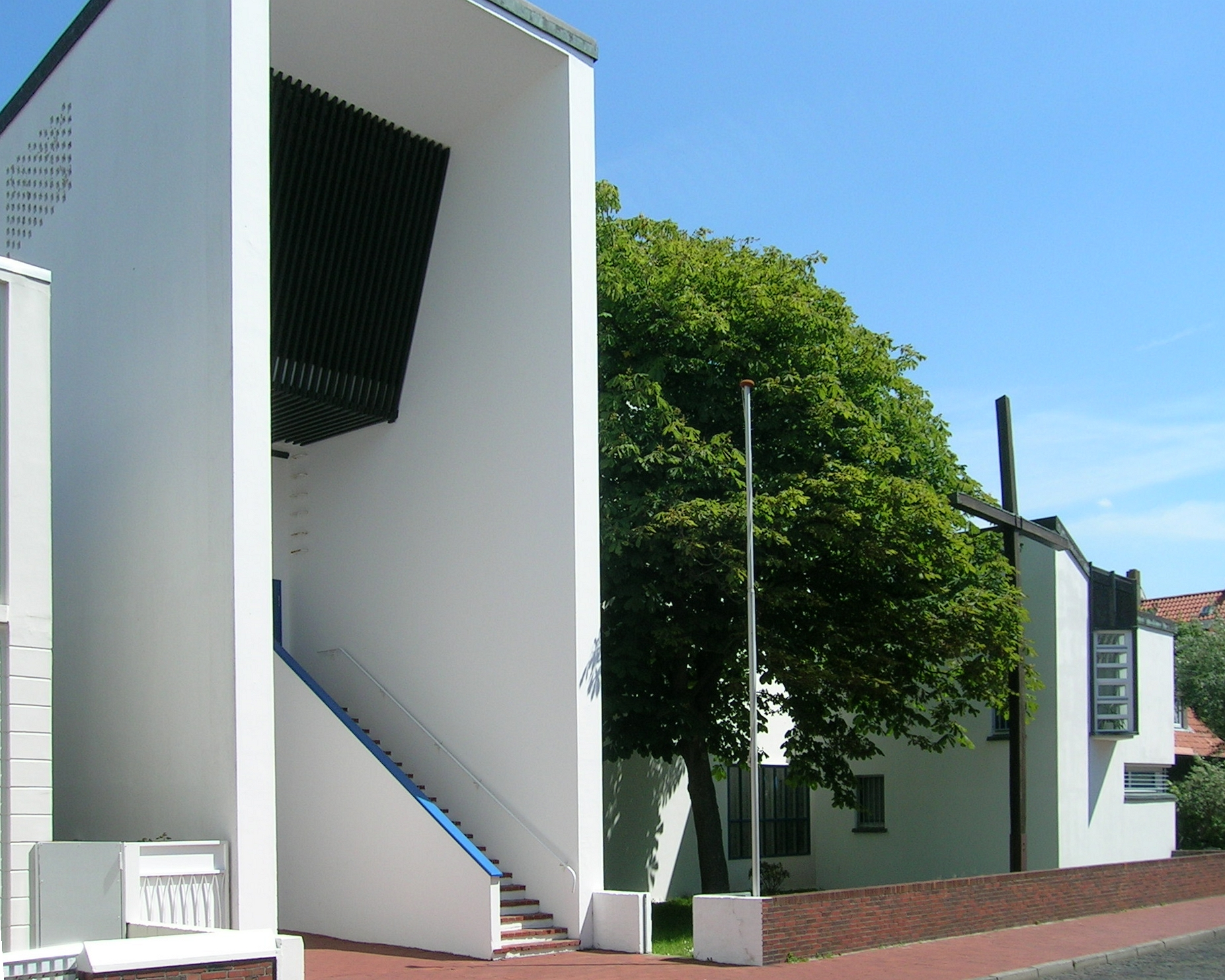
Stella Maris on the island of Norderney, 1931

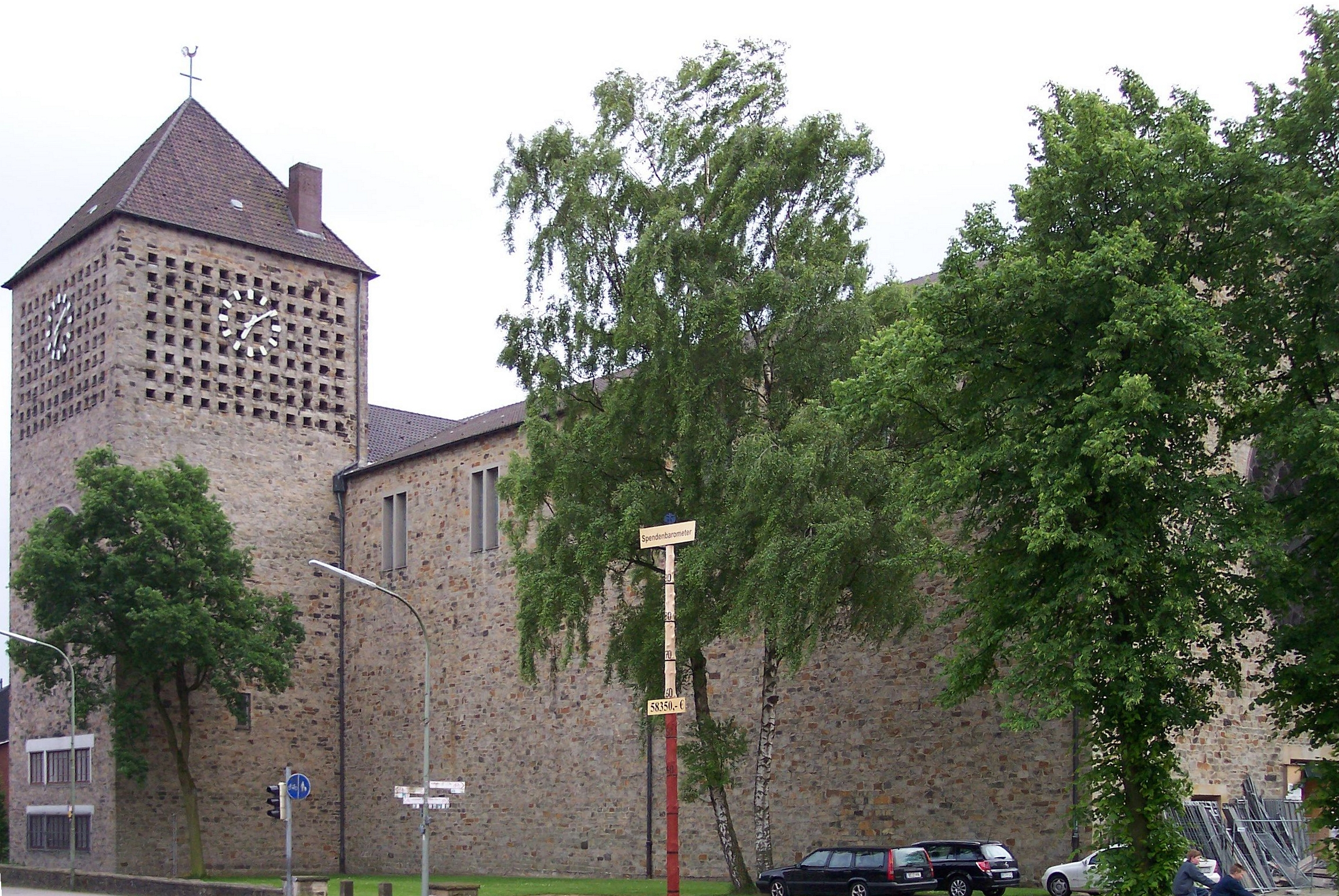
Heilig-Kreuz-Kirche in Dülmen

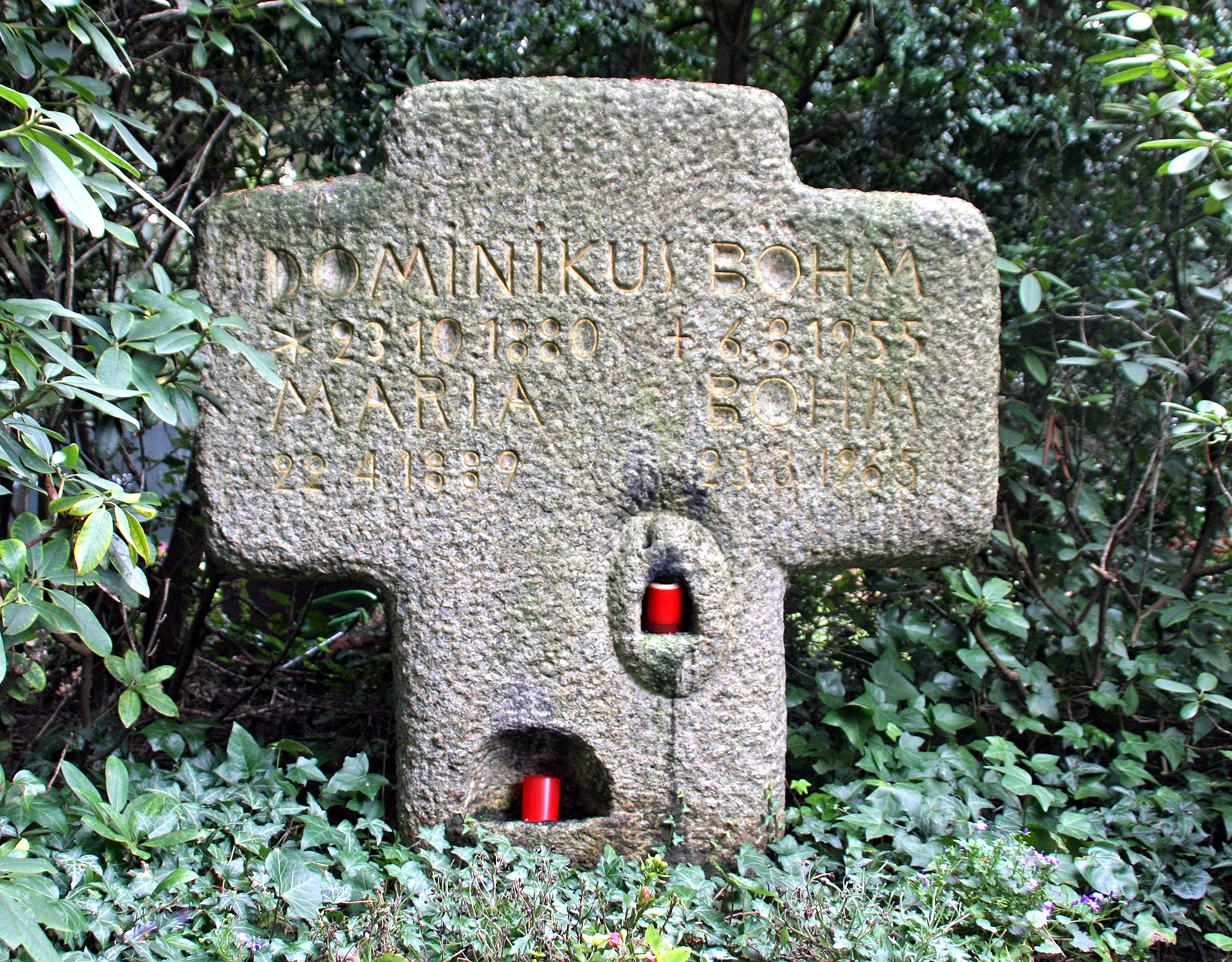
Grave of Dominikus Böhm in Cologne
