= Turkish-Islamic Union for Religious Affairs =

Islamic organisation in Germany

- Türkisch-Islamische Union der Anstalt für Religion e.V.
- Abbreviation: DİTİB
- Formation: 1984
- Type: Religious organization
- Headquarters: Ehrenfeld, Cologne, Germany

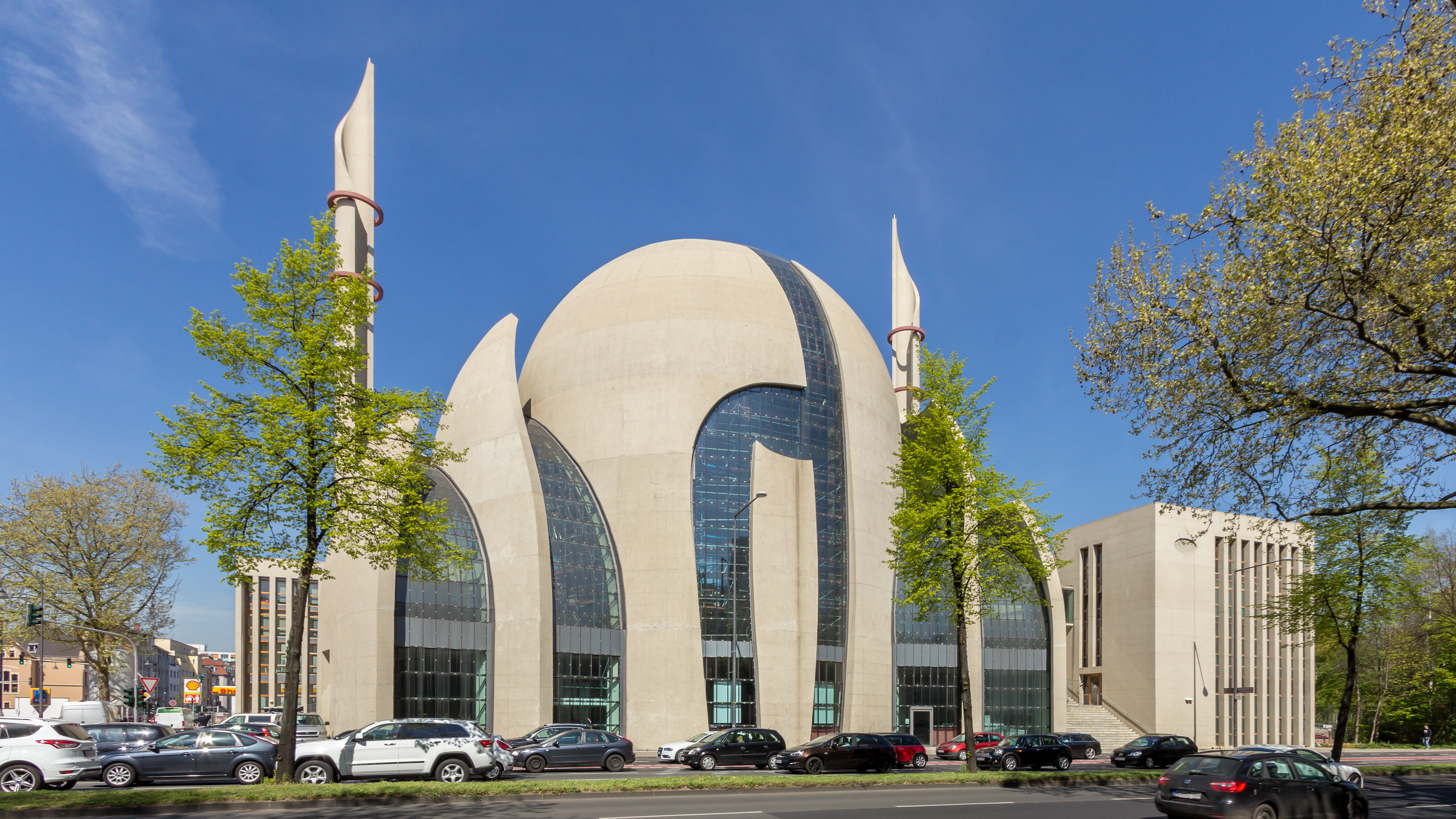
DİTİB Cologne Central Mosque in Cologne

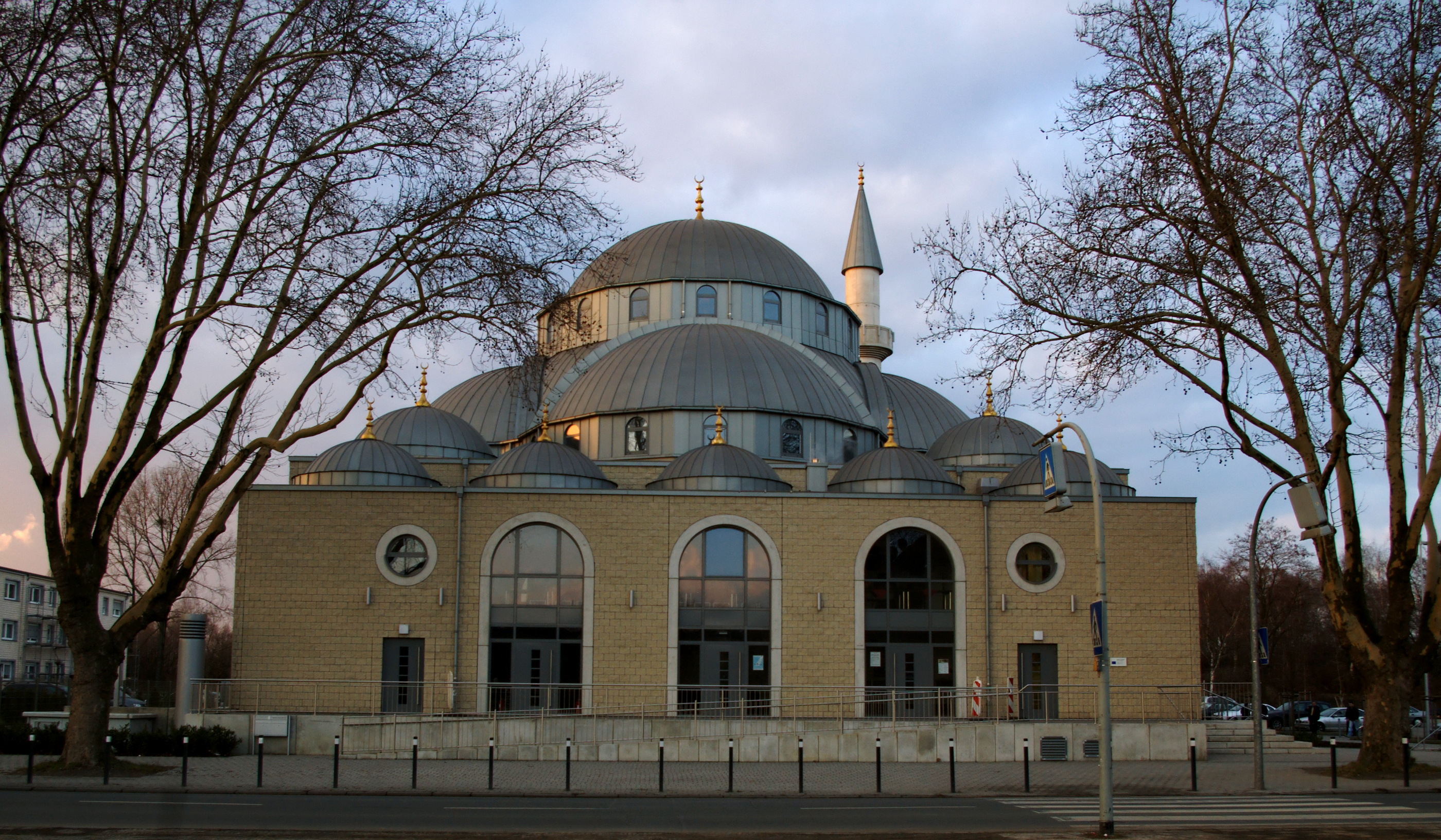
DİTİB-Merkez-Mosque in Duisburg

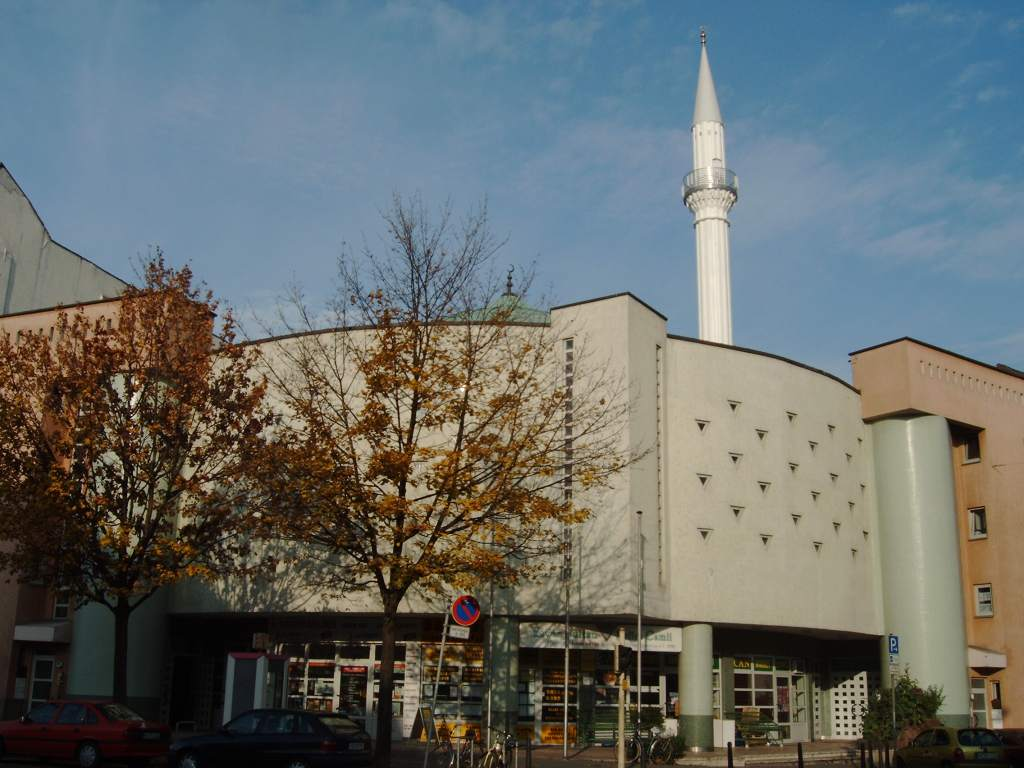
Yavuz-Sultan-Selim-Mosque in Mannheim

The Turkish-Islamic Union for Religious Affairs (DİTİB; German: Türkisch-Islamische Union der Anstalt für Religion e.V.; Turkish: Diyanet İşleri Türk-İslam Birliği) is one of the largest Islamic organisations in Germany. Founded in 1984 as a branch of the Presidency of Religious Affairs in Ankara, it is an "arm" of the Turkish state. The headquarters are in Cologne-Ehrenfeld.

As of 2016, the DİTİB funds 900 mosques in Germany.

The imams and the religious teachers, officially classified as civil servants of the Turkish state, are trained in Ankara and sent to Germany from Turkey. DİTİB claims it is independent of the Government of Turkey. Because the state back then was almost bankrupt, the officials had to be paid with money from the Muslim World League, which provoked protest from secularists. The fixation on Turkey and the Turkish language proved to be a handicap, because other Islamic organisations used the German language in public. Many individuals, DİTİB members and non-members alike, considered the use of German to be a more inclusive, respectful, and necessary approach for a dialogue with the host country's citizens and institutions.

== Organisation ==
DITIB received state aid from the Federal Ministry of the Interior in Germany: in the period 2012 to 2018, DİTİB received about €6 million. When it was initially founded, around 230 associations were members; by 2005 the number was 870. The local associations are registered independently for legal and financial purposes, but share the goals and principles of DİTİB as their foundation. They also acknowledge DİTİB as their umbrella organisation. It has a number of social and religious institutions.

In 2018, the Federal Ministry of the Interior cut all funding after DİTİB had been involved in multiple controversies, including its refusal to take part in a Cologne anti-terror march in 2017.

== 2004 rally ==
Under the presidency of Rıdvan Çakır, DİTİB tries to present itself as a more integrated actor in German society. DİTİB was one of the initiators of the mass-event "Gemeinsam für Frieden und gegen Terror" (en: "Together for Peace and against Terror"). Over 20,000 Muslims participated in this demonstration, which was held on November 21, 2004 in Cologne. Participants who gave speeches included the Green Party politician Claudia Roth, Bavaria's Interior Minister Günther Beckstein, and Fritz Behrens. The goal was to signal the disapproval of the use of violence in the name of Islam. It was one of the largest demonstrations of its kind in Germany's history.

== Controversies ==
=== Antisemitism ===
Since DİTİB's foundation in 1984, several of its chapters across Germany, departments, and senior representatives, like board members and religious scholars, have been found guilty of violating the Basic Law for the Federal Republic of Germany by spreading antisemitic hate speech, offensive libels, and incitement to violence against the Jewish people, mostly through the organization's social media accounts.

=== Armenophobia and Armenian genocide denial ===
DİTİB has been one of the strongest opponents of Germany's recognition of the Armenian genocide, and has consistently lobbied against its formal recognition, until the latter was finally formally recognized by the German Bundestag on June 2, 2016. Despite this, the organization's imams and religious scholars continue to publicly and explicitly deny the Armenian genocide, while many of them have also openly spread anti-Armenian sentiment.

=== Cooperation with Turkish intelligence services ===
Since the organization's foundation in 1984, German media outlets, investigative journalists, Germany's intelligence agencies, and law enforcement services have conducted numerous investigations into DİTİB's collusion with the Turkish intelligence apparatus. Many of these investigations produced evidence-based reports that DİTİB has established and maintained an extensive network of ties with the National Intelligence Organization (MİT), Turkey's national civilian intelligence and security agency, which is directly subordinate to the Government of Turkey.

DİTİB's clandestine cooperation with MİT has spanned several decades and included actions that the German legal system regards as criminal offenses, such as intelligence gathering, dissemination of propaganda, incitement, harassment of Turkish opposition figures and minority groups (Armenians, Alevis, Greeks, Kurds, or members of Gülen movement), etc.

=== Support for Turkish military's operations in Syria ===
In January 2018, after the start of the Turkish military operation in Afrin, the Turkish Diyanet, to which DİTİB imams are administratively attached, called on imams to recite the 48th sura of the Quran ("The Victory") for the success of the operation. Der Spiegel reported that several DİTİB mosque communities in Germany published corresponding calls on their Facebook pages, and that the religious attaché of the Turkish embassy in Berlin did likewise. DİTİB's federal association rejected the reports, stating that no instruction to hold specific prayers had been issued and that congregations decide on their own prayers as part of constitutionally protected religious freedom.

The reports were criticised by German politicians. Green politician Volker Beck said DİTİB was acting as a propaganda agent of the Turkish state, while CDU/CSU deputy parliamentary leader Stephan Harbarth described the calls as divisive and warned against importing foreign conflicts into Germany.

In March 2018, DİTİB mosques and other Turkish institutions in several German states were targeted in a series of arson attacks. Investigators attributed at least some of the attacks to extremist Kurdish perpetrators, and a spokesperson for the Federal Ministry of the Interior said they demonstrated the escalation potential of the conflict. The Kurdistan Workers' Party (PKK) has been subject to a ban on activities in Germany since 1993 and listed as a terrorist organisation by the EU since 2002; in a 2017 clarification of the associated ban on symbols, the Federal Ministry of the Interior included the emblems of the PYD and its YPG and YPJ units, which the Federal Office for the Protection of the Constitutioncharacterises as a Syrian sister organisation of the PKK and its armed wing. The PYD and YPG are not themselves banned as organisations in Germany, and the scope of the symbol ban has been the subject of parliamentary inquiries.

== See also ==
- Islam in Germany
- Turkish-Islamic synthesis
- List of DITB mosques in Germany
