= North Rhine-Westphalia (Bundestag electoral district) =

Electoral district in Germany

- Nordrhein-Westfalen
- Electoral District for the Bundestag
- Location of North Rhine-Westphalia within Germany
- State: North Rhine-Westphalia
- Population: 18,034,454 (2024)
- Electorate: 12,884,209 (2025)
- Area: 34,113 km^{2} (2022)

Current Electoral District
- Created: 1949
- Seats: List: – (2025–present) (Note: The number of seats allocated to the upper-tier state electoral districts is not fixed but is dependent on the national results at each election.); 127 (2021–2025); 128 (2013–2021); – (1957–2013); 138 (1953–1957); 109 (1949–1953)
- Members: List (Note: State-list members only.): Adam Balten (AfD); Felix Banaszak (Grüne); Jens Behrens (SPD); Lukas Benner (Grüne); Peter Bohnhof (AfD); Jürgen Coße (SPD); Janosch Dahmen (Grüne); Jan Dieren (SPD); Tobias Ebenberger (AfD); Mirze Edis (Linke); Michael Espendiller (AfD); Fabian Fahl (Linke); Katrin Fey (Linke); Hauke Finger (AfD); Schahina Gambir (Grüne); Kathrin Gebel (Linke); Jan-Niclas Gesenhues (Grüne); Kay Gottschalk (AfD); Kerstin Griese (SPD); Serap Güler (CDU); Sebastian Hartmann (SPD); Britta Haßelmann (Grüne); Jochen Haug (AfD); Matthias Helferich (AfD); Udo Hemmelgarn (AfD); Mareike Hermeier (Linke); Nadine Heselhaus (SPD); Fabian Jacobi (AfD); Lamya Kaddor (Grüne); Stefan Keuter (AfD); Maximilian Kneller (AfD); Cansın Köktürk (Linke); Jan Köstering (Linke); Manuel Krauthausen (AfD); Sonja Lemke (Linke); Sascha Lensing (AfD); Rüdiger Lucassen (AfD); Max Lucks (Grüne); Bettina Lugk (SPD); Markus Matzerath (AfD); Knuth Meyer-Soltau (AfD); Irene Mihalic (Grüne); Claudia Moll (SPD); Rolf Mützenich (SPD); Stefan Nacke (CDU); Sara Nanni (Grüne); Charlotte Neuhäuser (Linke); Ophelia Nick (Grüne); Denis Pauli (AfD); Anna Rathert (AfD); Lea Reisner (Linke); Martin Renner (AfD); Daniel Rinkert (SPD); Ulle Schauws (Grüne); Georg Schroeter (AfD); Lisa Schubert (Linke); Svenja Schulze (SPD); Stefan Schwartze (SPD); Nyke Slawik (Grüne); Sandra Stein (Grüne); Otto Strauß (AfD); Ulrich Thoden (Linke); Astrid Timmermann-Fechter (CDU); Katrin Uhlig (Grüne); Robin Wagener (Grüne); Sascha H. Wagner (Linke); Daniel Walter (SPD); Dirk Wiese (SPD); Christian Wirth (AfD); Christian Zaum (AfD); Daniel Zerbin (AfD); Ulrich von Zons (AfD)
- Constituencies: List: Aachen I; Aachen II; Bielefeld – Gütersloh II; Bochum I; Bonn; Borken II; Bottrop – Recklinghausen III; Coesfeld – Steinfurt II; Cologne I; Cologne II; Cologne III; Dortmund I; Dortmund II; Duisburg I; Duisburg II; Düren; Düsseldorf I; Düsseldorf II; Ennepe-Ruhr-Kreis II; Essen II; Essen III; Euskirchen – Rhein-Erft-Kreis II; Gelsenkirchen; Gütersloh I; Hagen – Ennepe-Ruhr-Kreis I; Hamm – Unna II; Heinsberg; Herford – Minden-Lübbecke II; Herne – Bochum II; Hochsauerlandkreis; Höxter – Gütersloh III – Lippe II; Kleve; Krefeld I – Neuss II; Krefeld II – Wesel II; Leverkusen – Cologne IV; Lippe I; Märkischer Kreis II; Mettmann I; Mettmann II; Minden-Lübbecke I; Mönchengladbach; Mülheim – Essen I; Münster; Neuss I; Oberbergischer Kreis; Oberhausen – Wesel III; Olpe – Märkischer Kreis I; Paderborn; Recklinghausen I; Recklinghausen II; Rhein-Erft-Kreis I; Rhein-Sieg-Kreis I; Rhein-Sieg-Kreis II; Rheinisch-Bergischer Kreis; Siegen-Wittgenstein; Soest; Solingen – Remscheid – Wuppertal II; Steinfurt I – Borken I; Steinfurt III; Unna I; Viersen; Warendorf; Wesel I; Wuppertal I
- Created from: List: Cologne–Aachen; Düsseldorf East; Düsseldorf West; Westphalia North; Westphalia South

North Rhine-Westphalia (German: Nordrhein-Westfalen) is one of the 16 multi-member upper-tier state electoral districts of the Bundestag, one of the two national legislatures of Germany. The district was created in 1949 following the restoration of democracy in West Germany with the creation of the Federal Republic of Germany. It is conterminous with the state of North Rhine-Westphalia. At the 2025 federal election the constituency had 12,884,209 registered electors and elected 136 of the 630 members of the Bundestag. The district's members are elected using the mixed-member proportional representation electoral system and is currently divided into 64 lower-tier constituencies.

== Electoral system ==
Members of the Bundestag for North Rhine-Westphalia are elected using a complex mixed-member proportional representation electoral system that has evolved over time.

1949 Electoral Act
The Parliamentary Council of West Germany, a constituent assembly elected by Parliaments of the eleven states of West Germany, could not agree upon the electoral law to be included in the Basic Law, the constitution of the nascent nation. The Council instead established a special committee to draft an electoral law for the first federal election. In February 1949 the Council adopted an electoral law which would establish a mixed electoral system with 50% of seats elected using the first-past-the-post system and the other 50% via federal lists, and there would no electoral threshold. The Allied-occupying authorities objected to the new electoral as they considered that the Parliamentary Council was not competent to enact electoral law and only the states could do so. The minister presidents of the states referred the issue back to the Parliamentary Council which passed another electoral law on 10 May 1949 with a two-thirds majority. The Allied military governors objected to several parts of the new law and ordered changes to be made. In response, the minister presidents promulgated an amended electoral law on 15 June 1949, the "Electoral Act for the first Bundestag and the first Federal Assembly of the Federal Republic of Germany" (Wahlgesetz zum ersten Bundestag und zur ersten Bundesversammlung der Bundesrepublik Deutschland). On 5 August 1949 the minister presidents promulgated an amendment to the electoral law in relation to method of calculating the seat allocation in the upper-tier electoral districts.

The amended law provided for 400 members of the Bundestag of which 109 would be elected from North Rhine-Westphalia. Each state government was to distribute the seats in their respective states with 60% of seats being allocated to constituency seats or direct mandates (Direktmandat) elected from lower-tier single-member constituencies with the remaining 40% of seats being state seats allocated to state lists (Landesliste or Landeswahlvorschlag) elected from upper-tier multi-member electoral districts. In the lower-tier constituencies the candidate with the most votes was elected (plurality voting). In order to calculate the state seats won by each party, the total seats allocated to each state, excluding constituency seats won by independents and parties that did not submit a state-list nomination, were distributed to parties using the D'Hondt method. Only parties that had received at least 5% of the votes in the state or had won at least one constituency seat in the state (the basic mandate clause Grundmandatsklausel) were included in this calculation. Then the number of constituency seats won by the party in the state were deducted to determine the number of state seats won by each party. If the number of constituency seats won by a party exceeded the calculated number of seats it was entitled to in the state, it was permitted to retain the overhang seats (Überhangmandat). Finally, the state seats won by each party were distributed amongst its candidates in the order they appeared on the state list (closed list).

Vacancies in constituency seats were filled by by-elections until January 1953 when an amendment to the electoral law abolished by-elections and instead vacancies were filled from the party's state list.

1953 Electoral Act
In July 1953 a new electoral law, the "Electoral Act for the Second Bundestag and the Federal Assembly" (Wahlgesetz zum zweiten Bundestag und zur Bundesversammlung), was enacted. The new law provided for 484 members of the Bundestag of which 138 would be elected from North Rhine-Westphalia. The split between constituency seats and state seats was changed from 60:40 to 50:50 as the Parliamentary Council had envisaged in 1949. Voters had two votes instead of one - with their first vote (Erststimme) they chose a candidate in the lower-tier constituency and with their second vote (Zweitstimme) they chose a state list in the upper-tier electoral district. Split-ticket voting (panachage) was permitted. The two thresholds required to compete for state seats were transferred from the state level to the national level. Parties representing recognised national minorities (Nationale Minderheit) were exempt from the threshold requirements.

1956 Electoral Act
The "Bundeswahlgesetz" (Federal Election Act) enacted in May 1956 was the first permanent electoral law in post-war West Germany (the 1949 and 1953 Acts were provisional and only applied to the subsequent federal election). In December 1956 the Act was amended in relation to size of the Bundestag following the accession of Saarland to the federal republic. The Bundestag was to have 494 members (excluding the 22 non-voting members from West Berlin) but, unlike the previous Acts, seats weren't allocated to individual states which in effect meant seats were distributed amongst participating parties based on the national vote rather than on the state vote as previously. The requirement to have won at least one constituency seat nationally to compete for state seats was increased to at least three constituency seats nationally. The 5% threshold and exemption for parties representing recognised national minorities remained as previously.

The calculation of the number of state seats won by each party was carried out in three stages. Firstly, the total number of Bundestag seats - excluding constituency seats won by independents, parties that did not submit a state-list nomination and parties that did not meet the threshold requirements - were allocated amongst parties that met the threshold requirements based on their national total of second votes and using the D'Hondt method. Secondly, the seats allocated to each party was distributed to the upper-tier electoral district level based on their state total of second votes and using the D'Hondt method. Finally, the constituency seats won by the party in the state were deducted to determine the number of state seats won by each party. Parties retained overhang seats as previously.

In February 1964 the Act was amended to increase the size of the Bundestag from 494 to 496.

1975 Electoral Act
A new version of the Act was enacted in September 1975 but made no changes to electoral system. The method for allocating state seats was changed from D'Hondt to the largest remainder method with Hare quota in March 1985.

In June 1990 the Act was amended to allow the accession of the East German states into the federal republic, increasing the size of the Bundestag from 496 to 656. The Federal Constitutional Court ruled in September 1990 that the 5% national threshold violated the principle of equal voting rights as political parties from East Germany needed to increase their votes by a relatively larger amount than parties from West Germany in order to meet the threshold in a unified Germany. In response, the electoral law was amended in October 1990 to have separate 5% thresholds for East and West Germany and passing either one would allow the party to compete for upper-tier electoral district seats in the whole of Germany. This change was transitional and only applied to the subsequent election.

1993 Electoral Act
A new version of the Act was enacted in July 1993 but made no changes to electoral system. In November 1996 the Act was amended to decrease the size of the Bundestag from 656 to 598 but this change wasn't applied until the 2002 federal election. The method for allocating state seats was changed from largest remainder to the Sainte-Laguë method (also known as the Schepers method) in March 2008.

The existence of overhang seats at state level together with seats being allocated initially at the national level led to the possibility of negative vote weight - the more second votes a party received in a state in which it had overhang seats, the fewer overall seats it would end up receiving. The Federal Constitutional Court ruled in July 1998 that this violated the princicple of equal votes enshrined in the Basic Law. In response, the Act was amended in December 2011 but in July 2012 the Constitutional Court ruled this too violated the Basic Law as it still raised the possibility of negative vote weight. The Act was amended again in May 2013 to meet the Constitutional Court's ruling. The main changes were that the seats were allocated initially based on second votes at the state level rather than on the national level, and the introduction levelling seats (Ausgleichsmandat) to ensure that the final overall seat allocation was proportional to the second votes. The threshold limits and the method of electing lower-tier constituency seats remained unchanged.

The calculation of the state seats won by each party was carried out in multiple, circular stages. Firstly, the total number of seats in the Bundestag (598) was distributed amongst the upper-tier electoral districts based on their population of German citizens. Secondly, the total seats allocated to each upper-tier electoral district - excluding seats won at the lower-tier constituency level by independents, parties that did not submit a state-list nomination and parties that did not meet the threshold requirements - were allocated amongst parties that met the national threshold requirements based on their total second votes in the state and using the Sainte-Laguë method. Then the number of constituency seats won by the party in the state were deducted to determine the initial allocation of state seats won by each party. Parties retained overhang seats as previously. Each party's minimum seat entitlement was the sum of the initial allocation of state seats plus the number of constituency seats won by the party, including overhang seats. Next, the ratio of second votes to minimum seat entitlement was calculated for each party. Then, each party's second votes total was divided by the lowest of these ratios to determine the final national seat allocation. The difference between the final national seat allocation and the minimum seat entitlement was the number of levelling seats. The final national allocation was then distributed to the upper-tier electoral district level based on the number of second votes received by that party in each state but ensuring that each party received at least as many seats as the number of constituency seats the party won in the state. Finally, the number of constituency seats won by the party in the state were deducted to determine the final allocation of state seats won by each party. This final allocation of state seats could be lower than the initial allocation. One new clause in the Act was that if a party received more than half of the total number of second votes received by parties that met the threshold requirements, but did not receive more than half of the seats, additional seats were to be allocated to that party, using the same top-down method as above, until it received one seat more than half of the total number of seats in the Bundestag.

The existence overhang seats plus changes in the party system in Germany meant more and more levelling seats were required to achieve proportionality. In order to mitigate this, the Act was amended in November 2020 so that any overhang seats in excess of three for a party in a state would be off-set by a commensurate reduction in the party's state seats in other states. At the 2021 federal election the Christian Social Union received 12 overhang mandates in Bavaria but, as it only competed in that state, its nine excess overhang seats could not be off-set by a reductions in state seats elsewhere and as result 104 levelling seats were needed to achieve proportionality. This, together with a total 34 overhang seats, took the size of the Bundestag to 736, the largest in the democratic world.

The Act was amended in June 2023 to eliminate overhang seats, and therefore the need for levelling seats. The size of the Bundestag was increased from 598 to 630 whilst the basic mandate clause was abolished. The latter change was challenged in the Constitutional Court which ruled on 30 July 2024 that the 5% threshold without any exceptions was unconstitutional and ordered the reinstatement of the basic mandate clause on an interim basis. The calculation of the number of state seats won by each party was similar to the process used prior to the 2013 reform, with the exception that if a party won more constituency seats in a state than it was entitled to, its constituency winners were excluded from the Bundestag in decreasing order of their first vote share.

== Constituencies ==
=== Current ===
North Rhine-Westphalia is currently divided into 64 lower-tier constituencies:

- 86. Aachen I
- 87. Aachen II
- 88. Heinsberg
- 89. Düren
- 90. Rhein-Erft-Kreis I
- 91. Euskirchen – Rhein-Erft-Kreis II
- 92. Cologne I
- 93. Cologne II
- 94. Cologne III
- 95. Bonn
- 96. Rhein-Sieg-Kreis I
- 97. Rhein-Sieg-Kreis II
- 98. Oberbergischer Kreis
- 99. Rheinisch-Bergischer Kreis
- 100. Leverkusen – Cologne IV
- 101. Wuppertal I
- 102. Solingen – Remscheid – Wuppertal II
- 103. Mettmann I
- 104. Mettmann II
- 105. Düsseldorf I
- 106. Düsseldorf II
- 107. Neuss I
- 108. Mönchengladbach
- 109. Krefeld I – Neuss II
- 110. Viersen
- 111. Kleve
- 112. Wesel I
- 113. Krefeld II – Wesel II
- 114. Duisburg I
- 115. Duisburg II
- 116. Oberhausen – Wesel III
- 117. Mülheim – Essen I
- 118. Essen II
- 119. Essen III
- 120. Recklinghausen I
- 121. Recklinghausen II
- 122. Gelsenkirchen
- 123. Steinfurt I – Borken I
- 124. Bottrop – Recklinghausen III
- 125. Borken II
- 126. Coesfeld – Steinfurt II
- 127. Steinfurt III
- 128. Münster
- 129. Warendorf
- 130. Gütersloh I
- 131. Bielefeld – Gütersloh II
- 132. Herford – Minden-Lübbecke II
- 133. Minden-Lübbecke I
- 134. Lippe I
- 135. Höxter – Gütersloh III – Lippe II
- 136. Paderborn
- 137. Hagen – Ennepe-Ruhr-Kreis I
- 138. Ennepe-Ruhr-Kreis II
- 139. Bochum I
- 140. Herne – Bochum II
- 141. Dortmund I
- 142. Dortmund II
- 143. Unna I
- 144. Hamm – Unna II
- 145. Soest
- 146. Hochsauerlandkreis
- 147. Siegen-Wittgenstein
- 148. Olpe – Märkischer Kreis I
- 149. Märkischer Kreis II

=== Former ===
- Arnsberg – Soest
- Bielefeld – Halle
- Bochum II – Ennepe-Ruhr-Kreis II
- Cologne IV
- Detmold – Lippe
- Dortmund III
- Düsseldorf III
- Essen I
- Gelsenkirchen II – Recklinghausen III
- Krefeld
- Lemgo
- Leverkusen – Rheinisch-Bergischer Kreis II
- Lippstadt – Brilon
- Lüdenscheid
- Lüdinghausen
- Lüdinghausen – Coesfeld
- Märkischer Kreis I
- Neuss II
- Olpe – Meschede
- Olpe – Siegen-Wittgenstein II
- Remscheid
- Unna – Hamm
- Wanne-Eickel – Wattenscheid
- Wesel II
- Wuppertal II

== Election results ==
=== Summary ===
| Election | Communists DKP / KPD | | | Left Linke / PDS | | | Social Democrats SPD | | | Greens Grüne / AUD | | | Free Democrats FDP | | | Christian Democrats CDU | | | All-German GDP / DP | | | Alternative AfD | | | National Democrats NPD / DRP | | |
| Election | Votes | % | Seats | Votes | % | Seats | Votes | % | Seats | Votes | % | Seats | Votes | % | Seats | Votes | % | Seats | Votes | % | Seats | Votes | % | Seats | Votes | % | Seats |
|---|---|---|---|---|---|---|---|---|---|---|---|---|---|---|---|---|---|---|---|---|---|---|---|---|---|---|---|
| 2025 | | | | 877,123 | 8.33% | 13 | 2,108,434 | 20.03% | 31 | 1,300,901 | 12.36% | 19 | 462,446 | 4.39% | 0 | 3,170,627 | 30.12% | 47 | | | | 1,770,379 | 16.82% | 26 | | | |
| 2021 | 2,556 | 0.03% | 0 | 366,947 | 3.71% | 6 | 2,880,226 | 29.13% | 49 | 1,587,067 | 16.05% | 28 | 1,130,154 | 11.43% | 19 | 2,566,719 | 25.96% | 42 | | | | 717,510 | 7.26% | 12 | 8,956 | 0.09% | 0 |
| 2017 | 2,217 | 0.02% | 0 | 736,904 | 7.48% | 12 | 2,557,876 | 25.96% | 41 | 744,970 | 7.56% | 12 | 1,293,052 | 13.12% | 20 | 3,214,013 | 32.62% | 42 | | | | 928,425 | 9.42% | 15 | 21,287 | 0.22% | 0 |
| 2013 | | | | 582,925 | 6.14% | 10 | 3,028,282 | 31.88% | 52 | 760,642 | 8.01% | 13 | 498,027 | 5.24% | 0 | 3,776,563 | 39.76% | 63 | | | | 372,258 | 3.92% | 0 | 94,291 | 0.99% | 0 |
| 2009 | | | | 789,814 | 8.41% | 11 | 2,678,956 | 28.53% | 39 | 945,831 | 10.07% | 14 | 1,394,554 | 14.85% | 20 | 3,111,478 | 33.14% | 45 | | | | | | | 88,690 | 0.94% | 0 |
| 2005 | | | | 529,967 | 5.17% | 7 | 4,096,112 | 39.98% | 54 | 782,551 | 7.64% | 10 | 1,024,924 | 10.00% | 13 | 3,524,351 | 34.40% | 46 | | | | | | | 80,512 | 0.79% | 0 |
| 2002 | | | | 125,446 | 1.20% | 0 | 4,499,388 | 42.96% | 60 | 930,684 | 8.89% | 12 | 978,841 | 9.35% | 13 | 3,675,732 | 35.10% | 49 | | | | | | | 25,883 | 0.25% | 0 |
| 1998 | | | | 131,550 | 1.21% | 2 | 5,097,425 | 46.90% | 72 | 745,911 | 6.86% | 11 | 789,745 | 7.27% | 11 | 3,669,024 | 33.76% | 52 | | | | | | | 12,316 | 0.11% | 0 |
| 1994 | | | | 102,356 | 0.97% | 1 | 4,534,820 | 43.13% | 66 | 781,405 | 7.43% | 11 | 804,024 | 7.65% | 12 | 3,997,317 | 38.02% | 58 | | | | | | | | | |
| 1990 | | | | 28,922 | 0.28% | 1 | 4,195,971 | 41.11% | 65 | 440,216 | 4.31% | 0 | 1,118,967 | 10.96% | 17 | 4,131,698 | 40.48% | 63 | | | | | | | 24,637 | 0.24% | 0 |
| 1987 | | | | | | | 4,693,081 | 43.17% | 62 | 813,071 | 7.48% | 11 | 909,141 | 8.36% | 12 | 4,357,794 | 40.09% | 58 | | | | | | | 41,530 | 0.38% | 0 |
| 1983 | 21,065 | 0.19% | 0 | | | | 4,782,220 | 42.79% | 63 | 581,350 | 5.20% | 8 | 716,412 | 6.41% | 10 | 5,046,812 | 45.16% | 65 | | | | | | | 19,434 | 0.17% | 0 |
| 1980 | 23,115 | 0.21% | 0 | | | | 5,108,147 | 46.78% | 70 | 136,278 | 1.25% | 0 | 1,191,643 | 10.91% | 17 | 4,432,661 | 40.59% | 60 | | | | | | | 14,407 | 0.13% | 0 |
| 1976 | 38,176 | 0.35% | 0 | | | | 5,153,959 | 46.90% | 70 | 4,928 | 0.04% | 0 | 860,331 | 7.83% | 12 | 4,892,278 | 44.52% | 66 | | | | | | | 23,358 | 0.21% | 0 |
| 1972 | 37,600 | 0.34% | 0 | | | | 5,509,886 | 50.39% | 75 | | | | 856,963 | 7.84% | 12 | 4,484,657 | 41.01% | 61 | | | | | | | 37,628 | 0.34% | 0 |
| 1969 | | | | | | | 4,534,471 | 46.81% | 73 | | | | 526,861 | 5.44% | 9 | 4,222,914 | 43.59% | 69 | 4,325 | 0.04% | 0 | | | | 295,972 | 3.06% | 0 |
| 1965 | | | | | | | 4,149,910 | 42.56% | 66 | 11,428 | 0.12% | 0 | 739,954 | 7.59% | 13 | 4,593,281 | 47.10% | 74 | | | | | | | 110,299 | 1.13% | 0 |
| 1961 | | | | | | | 3,549,359 | 37.29% | 60 | | | | 1,118,460 | 11.75% | 19 | 4,530,553 | 47.60% | 76 | 83,131 | 0.87% | 0 | | | | 43,932 | 0.46% | 0 |
| 1957 | | | | | | | 2,965,616 | 33.49% | 54 | | | | 554,781 | 6.26% | 11 | 4,813,996 | 54.36% | 87 | 141,330 | 1.60% | 2 | | | | 57,755 | 0.65% | 0 |
| 1953 | 228,592 | 2.85% | 0 | | | | 2,553,014 | 31.88% | 47 | | | | 682,902 | 8.53% | 12 | 3,915,320 | 48.89% | 72 | 80,034 | 1.00% | 1 | | | | | | |
| 1949 | 513,225 | 7.63% | 9 | | | | 2,109,172 | 31.36% | 37 | | | | 581,456 | 8.64% | 10 | 2,481,523 | 36.89% | 43 | | | | | | | 117,998 | 1.75% | 0 |

=== Detailed ===
Party has received at least 5% of the vote nationally or won three (Note: One seat at the 1953 election.) seats at the lower-tier constituency level and is entitled to compete for seats at the upper-tier state level.
Party represents a recognised minority and is entitled to compete for seats at the upper-tier state level.

==== 2020s ====
===== 2025 =====
Results of the 2025 federal election held on 23 February 2025:

| Party | | Second votes per region | | | | | Total votes | % | Seats | | | | |
| Party | | Arnsberg | Cologne | Detmold | Düssel- dorf | Münster | Total votes | % | Constituency | | | Stat. | Tot. |
| Party | | Arnsberg | Cologne | Detmold | Düssel- dorf | Münster | Total votes | % | Win. | For. | Ele. | Stat. | Tot. |
|---|---|---|---|---|---|---|---|---|---|---|---|---|---|
| Christian Democratic Union of Germany | CDU | 622,499 | 788,757 | 376,235 | 854,524 | 528,612 | 3,170,627 | 30.12% | 44 | 0 | 44 | 3 | 47 |
| Social Democratic Party of Germany | SPD | 445,137 | 497,014 | 237,345 | 601,468 | 327,470 | 2,108,434 | 20.03% | 17 | 0 | 17 | 14 | 31 |
| Alternative for Germany | AfD | 389,735 | 399,974 | 241,767 | 483,302 | 255,601 | 1,770,379 | 16.82% | 0 | 0 | 0 | 26 | 26 |
| Alliance 90/The Greens | Grüne | 209,321 | 407,419 | 140,450 | 343,856 | 199,855 | 1,300,901 | 12.36% | 3 | 0 | 3 | 16 | 19 |
| Die Linke | Linke | 166,320 | 248,851 | 95,442 | 248,470 | 118,040 | 877,123 | 8.33% | 0 | 0 | 0 | 13 | 13 |
| Free Democratic Party | FDP | 77,376 | 127,786 | 52,716 | 140,578 | 63,990 | 462,446 | 4.39% | 0 | 0 | 0 | 0 | 0 |
| Sahra Wagenknecht Alliance | BSW | 87,984 | 106,734 | 54,152 | 126,523 | 57,518 | 432,911 | 4.11% | 0 | 0 | 0 | 0 | 0 |
| Human Environment Animal Protection Party | | 29,638 | 31,237 | 13,485 | 39,974 | 19,146 | 133,480 | 1.27% | 0 | 0 | 0 | 0 | 0 |
| Volt Germany | Volt | 10,900 | 22,684 | 6,254 | 19,417 | 9,660 | 68,915 | 0.65% | 0 | 0 | 0 | 0 | 0 |
| Die PARTEI | | 12,449 | 13,827 | 7,363 | 17,054 | 8,384 | 59,077 | 0.56% | 0 | 0 | 0 | 0 | 0 |
| Free Voters | FW | 9,934 | 13,571 | 7,251 | 13,495 | 8,640 | 52,891 | 0.50% | 0 | 0 | 0 | 0 | 0 |
| Grassroots Democratic Party of Germany | dieBasis | 4,434 | 5,952 | 3,224 | 5,857 | 2,752 | 22,219 | 0.21% | 0 | 0 | 0 | 0 | 0 |
| Team Todenhöfer | | 4,288 | 4,581 | 2,239 | 6,295 | 2,618 | 20,021 | 0.19% | 0 | 0 | 0 | 0 | 0 |
| Party of Progress | PdF | 3,275 | 4,722 | 2,092 | 5,115 | 2,761 | 17,965 | 0.17% | 0 | 0 | 0 | 0 | 0 |
| Bündnis Deutschland | BD | 3,182 | 3,405 | 1,593 | 3,713 | 1,776 | 13,669 | 0.13% | 0 | 0 | 0 | 0 | 0 |
| Values Union | WU | 1,374 | 1,539 | 1,232 | 1,849 | 742 | 6,736 | 0.06% | 0 | 0 | 0 | 0 | 0 |
| MERA25 | | 754 | 1,203 | 338 | 1,412 | 588 | 4,295 | 0.04% | 0 | 0 | 0 | 0 | 0 |
| Marxist–Leninist Party of Germany | MLPD | 951 | 708 | 230 | 1,484 | 672 | 4,045 | 0.04% | 0 | 0 | 0 | 0 | 0 |
| Valid votes | | 2,079,551 | 2,679,964 | 1,243,408 | 2,914,386 | 1,608,825 | 10,526,134 | 100.00% | 64 | 0 | 64 | 72 | 136 |
| Rejected votes | | 12,265 | 15,227 | 8,308 | 17,217 | 8,589 | 61,606 | 0.58% | | | | | |
| Total polled | | 2,091,816 | 2,695,191 | 1,251,716 | 2,931,603 | 1,617,414 | 10,587,740 | 82.18% | | | | | |
| Registered electors | | 2,573,397 | 3,232,313 | 1,518,119 | 3,620,084 | 1,940,296 | 12,884,209 | | | | | | |
| Turnout | | 81.29% | 83.38% | 82.45% | 80.98% | 83.36% | 82.18% | | | | | | |

The following candidates were elected:

- State seats - Adam Balten (AfD); Felix Banaszak (Grüne); Jens Behrens (SPD); Lukas Benner (Grüne); Peter Bohnhof (AfD); Jürgen Coße (SPD); Janosch Dahmen (Grüne); Tobias Ebenberger (AfD); Mirze Edis (Linke); Michael Espendiller (AfD); Fabian Fahl (Linke); Katrin Fey (Linke); Hauke Finger (AfD); Uwe Foullong (Linke); Schahina Gambir (Grüne); Kathrin Gebel (Linke); Jan-Niclas Gesenhues (Grüne); Kay Gottschalk (AfD); Kerstin Griese (SPD); Serap Güler (CDU); Sebastian Hartmann (SPD); Britta Haßelmann (Grüne); Jochen Haug (AfD); Matthias Helferich (AfD); Udo Hemmelgarn (AfD); Mareike Hermeier (Linke); Nadine Heselhaus (SPD); Fabian Jacobi (AfD); Lamya Kaddor (Grüne); Stefan Keuter (AfD); Maximilian Kneller (AfD); Cansın Köktürk (Linke); Jan Köstering (Linke); Manuel Krauthausen (AfD); Sonja Lemke (Linke); Sascha Lensing (AfD); Rüdiger Lucassen (AfD); Max Lucks (Grüne); Bettina Lugk (SPD); Markus Matzerath (AfD); Knuth Meyer-Soltau (AfD); Irene Mihalic (Grüne); Claudia Moll (SPD); Rolf Mützenich (SPD); Stefan Nacke (CDU); Sara Nanni (Grüne); Charlotte Neuhäuser (Linke); Ophelia Nick (Grüne); Denis Pauli (AfD); Anna Rathert (AfD); Lea Reisner (Linke); Martin Renner (AfD); Daniel Rinkert (SPD); Ulle Schauws (Grüne); Georg Schroeter (AfD); Svenja Schulze (SPD); Stefan Schwartze (SPD); Nyke Slawik (Grüne); Sandra Stein (Grüne); Otto Strauß (AfD); Ulrich Thoden (Linke); Astrid Timmermann-Fechter (CDU); Katrin Uhlig (Grüne); Robin Wagener (Grüne); Sascha H. Wagner (Linke); Daniel Walter (SPD); Dirk Wiese (SPD); Christian Wirth (AfD); Christian Zaum (AfD); Daniel Zerbin (AfD); and Ulrich von Zons (AfD).

Substitutions:

- Uwe Foullong (Linke) resigned on 31 July 2025 and was replaced by Lisa Schubert (Linke) on 1 August 2025.

===== 2021 =====
Results of the 2021 federal election held on 26 September 2021:

| Party | | Second votes per region | | | | | Total votes | % | Seats | | | | |
| Party | | Arnsberg | Cologne | Detmold | Düssel- dorf | Münster | Total votes | % | Con. | State | | | Tot. |
| Party | | Arnsberg | Cologne | Detmold | Düssel- dorf | Münster | Total votes | % | Con. | Ini. | Lev. | Ele. | Tot. |
|---|---|---|---|---|---|---|---|---|---|---|---|---|---|
| Social Democratic Party of Germany | SPD | 634,338 | 656,917 | 328,562 | 802,546 | 457,863 | 2,880,226 | 29.13% | 30 | 10 | 9 | 19 | 49 |
| Christian Democratic Union of Germany | CDU | 481,533 | 654,764 | 306,044 | 698,878 | 425,500 | 2,566,719 | 25.96% | 30 | 5 | 7 | 12 | 42 |
| Alliance 90/The Greens | Grüne | 265,635 | 483,102 | 175,937 | 428,872 | 233,521 | 1,587,067 | 16.05% | 4 | 18 | 6 | 24 (Note: The Greens were allocated 23 state seats in North Rhine-Westphalia following the federal election in September 2021 but, after the re-run of the federal election in parts of Berlin in February 2024, the seat allocation was recalculated across Germany and the Greens were allocated one additional state seat in North Rhine-Westphalia.) | 28 |
| Free Democratic Party | FDP | 210,712 | 297,506 | 136,825 | 325,300 | 159,811 | 1,130,154 | 11.43% | 0 | 15 | 4 | 19 | 19 |
| Alternative for Germany | AfD | 161,118 | 160,940 | 98,465 | 196,598 | 100,389 | 717,510 | 7.26% | 0 | 10 | 2 | 12 | 12 |
| Die Linke | Linke | 72,104 | 101,551 | 43,564 | 101,598 | 48,130 | 366,947 | 3.71% | 0 | 5 | 1 | 6 | 6 |
| Human Environment Animal Protection Party | | 30,954 | 32,579 | 13,419 | 40,625 | 18,618 | 136,195 | 1.38% | 0 | 0 | 0 | 0 | 0 |
| Die PARTEI | | 24,049 | 25,273 | 12,994 | 31,396 | 14,792 | 108,504 | 1.10% | 0 | 0 | 0 | 0 | 0 |
| Grassroots Democratic Party of Germany | dieBasis | 18,097 | 28,018 | 14,950 | 26,649 | 11,503 | 99,217 | 1.00% | 0 | 0 | 0 | 0 | 0 |
| Team Todenhöfer | | 13,373 | 16,642 | 4,873 | 22,284 | 7,965 | 65,137 | 0.66% | 0 | 0 | 0 | 0 | 0 |
| Free Voters | FW | 13,833 | 17,270 | 8,377 | 17,389 | 8,121 | 64,990 | 0.66% | 0 | 0 | 0 | 0 | 0 |
| Pirate Party Germany | Piraten | 7,634 | 9,935 | 4,206 | 9,990 | 5,024 | 36,789 | 0.37% | 0 | 0 | 0 | 0 | 0 |
| Volt Germany | Volt | 4,750 | 15,576 | 2,595 | 8,456 | 4,662 | 36,039 | 0.36% | 0 | 0 | 0 | 0 | 0 |
| European Party Love | Liebe | 2,706 | 3,306 | 1,490 | 3,670 | 1,795 | 12,967 | 0.13% | 0 | 0 | 0 | 0 | 0 |
| Party for Health Research | | 2,616 | 2,748 | 1,311 | 3,339 | 1,659 | 11,673 | 0.12% | 0 | 0 | 0 | 0 | 0 |
| Alliance C – Christians for Germany | | 1,878 | 2,104 | 4,013 | 1,513 | 620 | 10,128 | 0.10% | 0 | 0 | 0 | 0 | 0 |
| Lobbyists for Children | LfK | 1,840 | 2,174 | 1,151 | 2,743 | 1,281 | 9,189 | 0.09% | 0 | 0 | 0 | 0 | 0 |
| National Democratic Party of Germany | NPD | 2,303 | 1,843 | 957 | 2,585 | 1,268 | 8,956 | 0.09% | 0 | 0 | 0 | 0 | 0 |
| Ecological Democratic Party | ÖDP | 1,739 | 2,081 | 992 | 1,837 | 1,403 | 8,052 | 0.08% | 0 | 0 | 0 | 0 | 0 |
| Party of Humanists | PdH | 1,508 | 2,136 | 877 | 2,196 | 968 | 7,685 | 0.08% | 0 | 0 | 0 | 0 | 0 |
| V-Partei3 | V | 1,183 | 1,746 | 685 | 2,140 | 874 | 6,628 | 0.07% | 0 | 0 | 0 | 0 | 0 |
| Die Urbane. Eine HipHop Partei | | 928 | 1,311 | 573 | 1,317 | 600 | 4,729 | 0.05% | 0 | 0 | 0 | 0 | 0 |
| Marxist–Leninist Party of Germany | MLPD | 764 | 543 | 232 | 1,366 | 571 | 3,476 | 0.04% | 0 | 0 | 0 | 0 | 0 |
| Party of Progress | PdF | 612 | 881 | 386 | 906 | 443 | 3,228 | 0.03% | 0 | 0 | 0 | 0 | 0 |
| German Communist Party | DKP | 564 | 432 | 211 | 832 | 517 | 2,556 | 0.03% | 0 | 0 | 0 | 0 | 0 |
| Liberal Conservative Reformers | LKR | 419 | 615 | 288 | 640 | 336 | 2,298 | 0.02% | 0 | 0 | 0 | 0 | 0 |
| Socialist Equality Party | SGP | 176 | 236 | 103 | 321 | 135 | 971 | 0.01% | 0 | 0 | 0 | 0 | 0 |
| Valid votes | | 1,957,366 | 2,522,229 | 1,164,080 | 2,735,986 | 1,508,369 | 9,888,030 | 100.00% | 64 | 63 | 29 | 92 | 156 |
| Rejected votes | | 14,541 | 17,901 | 9,515 | 20,998 | 9,999 | 72,954 | 0.73% | | | | | |
| Total polled | | 1,971,907 | 2,540,130 | 1,173,595 | 2,756,984 | 1,518,368 | 9,960,984 | 76.39% | | | | | |
| Registered electors | | 2,624,117 | 3,248,453 | 1,534,402 | 3,677,443 | 1,955,852 | 13,040,267 | | | | | | |
| Turnout | | 75.15% | 78.20% | 76.49% | 74.97% | 77.63% | 76.39% | | | | | | |

The following candidates were elected:

- State seats - Dagmar Andres (SPD); Maik Außendorf (Grüne); Felix Banaszak (Grüne); Nezahat Baradari (SPD); Roger Beckamp (AfD); Olaf in der Beek (FDP); Lukas Benner (Grüne); Matthias Birkwald (Linke); Michael Breilmann (CDU); Marco Buschmann (FDP); Karlheinz Busen (FDP); Jürgen Coße (SPD); Carl-Julius Cronenberg (FDP); Sevim Dağdelen (Linke); Janosch Dahmen (Grüne); Bernhard Daldrup (SPD); Bijan Djir-Sarai (FDP); Katharina Dröge (Grüne); Michael Espendiller (AfD); Otto Fricke (FDP); Schahina Gambir (Grüne); Kai Gehring (Grüne); Jan-Niclas Gesenhues (Grüne); Kay Gottschalk (AfD); Alexander Graf Lambsdorff (FDP); Kerstin Griese (SPD); Sabine Grützmacher (Grüne); Serap Güler (CDU); Jürgen Hardt (CDU); Sebastian Hartmann (SPD); Britta Haßelmann (Grüne); Jochen Haug (AfD); Matthias Helferich (AfD); Katrin Helling-Plahr (FDP); Wolfgang Hellmich (SPD); Kathrin Henneberger (Grüne); Markus Herbrand (FDP); Nadine Heselhaus (SPD); Reinhard Houben (FDP); Andrej Hunko (Linke); Hubert Hüppe (CDU); Fabian Jacobi (AfD); Lamya Kaddor (Grüne); Stefan Keuter (AfD); Laura Kraft (Grüne); Markus Kurth (Grüne); Sarah Lahrkamp (SPD); Armin Laschet (CDU); Christian Leye (Linke); Luiza Licina-Bode (SPD); Anja Liebert (Grüne); Christian Lindner (FDP); Rüdiger Lucassen (AfD); Max Lucks (Grüne); Bettina Lugk (SPD); Zanda Martens (SPD); Irene Mihalic (Grüne); Stefan Nacke (CDU); Sara Nanni (Grüne); Ophelia Nick (Grüne); Dietmar Nietan (SPD); Kerstin Radomski (CDU); Martin Renner (AfD); Bernd Reuther (FDP); Ye-One Rhie (SPD); Jessica Rosenthal (SPD); Catarina dos Santos Firnhaber (CDU); Christian Sauter (FDP); Frank Schäffler (FDP); Ulle Schauws (Grüne); Udo Schiefner (SPD); Eugen Schmidt (AfD); Jörg Schneider (AfD); Svenja Schulze (SPD); Nyke Slawik (Grüne); Anne-Monika Spallek (Grüne); Marie-Agnes Strack-Zimmermann (FDP); Jens Teutrine (FDP); Astrid Timmermann-Fechter (CDU); Manfred Todtenhausen (FDP); Kerstin Vieregge (CDU); Johannes Vogel (FDP); Kathrin Vogler (Linke); Oliver Vogt (CDU); Robin Wagener (Grüne); Sahra Wagenknecht (Linke); Nicole Westig (FDP); Harald Weyel (AfD); Dirk Wiese (SPD); Sabine Weiss (CDU); and Gülistan Yüksel (SPD).

Following the re-run of the federal election in parts of Berlin in February 2024, the seat allocation was recalculated across Germany and the Greens were allocated one additional state seat in North Rhine-Westphalia which was initially allocated to Michael Sacher but, as he had already entered the Bundestag in June 2022 following the resignation of Oliver Krischer, the seat was taken up by Franziska Krumwiede-Steiner.

Substitutions:

- Alexander Graf Lambsdorff (FDP) resigned on 7 August 2023 and was replaced by Katharina Willkomm (FDP) on the same day.
- Marie-Agnes Strack-Zimmermann (FDP) resigned on 15 July 2024 and was replaced by Fabian Griewel (FDP) on 16 July 2024.

Additional state seats following vacation of constituency seats:

- Oliver Krischer (Grüne, Aachen I) resigned on 28 June 2022 and was replaced by Michael Sacher (Grüne) on 30 June 2022.
- Rainer Keller (SPD, Wesel I) died on 22 September 2022 and was replaced by Daniel Rinkert (SPD) on 30 September 2022.

==== 2010s ====
===== 2017 =====
Results of the 2017 federal election held on 24 September 2017:

| Party | | Second votes per region | | | | | Total votes | % | Seats | | | | |
| Party | | Arnsberg | Cologne | Detmold | Düssel- dorf | Münster | Total votes | % | Con. | State | | | Tot. |
| Party | | Arnsberg | Cologne | Detmold | Düssel- dorf | Münster | Total votes | % | Con. | Ini. | Lev. | Ele. | Tot. |
|---|---|---|---|---|---|---|---|---|---|---|---|---|---|
| Christian Democratic Union of Germany | CDU | 605,944 | 797,155 | 460,462 | 873,413 | 477,039 | 3,214,013 | 32.62% | 38 | 5 | -1 | 4 | 42 |
| Social Democratic Party of Germany | SPD | 563,541 | 602,545 | 327,487 | 711,241 | 353,062 | 2,557,876 | 25.96% | 26 | 9 | 6 | 15 | 41 |
| Free Democratic Party | FDP | 236,897 | 350,140 | 161,873 | 386,181 | 157,961 | 1,293,052 | 13.12% | 0 | 17 | 3 | 20 | 20 |
| Alternative for Germany | AfD | 203,537 | 212,029 | 125,375 | 268,142 | 119,342 | 928,425 | 9.42% | 0 | 13 | 2 | 15 | 15 |
| Alliance 90/The Greens | Grüne | 125,879 | 227,403 | 98,984 | 196,852 | 95,852 | 744,970 | 7.56% | 0 | 10 | 2 | 12 | 12 |
| Die Linke | Linke | 149,369 | 196,066 | 92,014 | 209,943 | 89,512 | 736,904 | 7.48% | 0 | 10 | 2 | 12 | 12 |
| Die PARTEI | | 16,793 | 22,083 | 9,368 | 23,941 | 9,391 | 81,576 | 0.83% | 0 | 0 | 0 | 0 | 0 |
| Human Environment Animal Protection Party | | 16,428 | 17,931 | 7,963 | 22,778 | 8,841 | 73,941 | 0.75% | 0 | 0 | 0 | 0 | 0 |
| Pirate Party Germany | Piraten | 9,706 | 10,776 | 5,307 | 12,618 | 5,173 | 43,580 | 0.44% | 0 | 0 | 0 | 0 | 0 |
| Alliance of German Democrats | AD | 9,410 | 7,951 | 3,448 | 14,615 | 5,827 | 41,251 | 0.42% | 0 | 0 | 0 | 0 | 0 |
| Free Voters | FW | 5,884 | 6,934 | 5,052 | 6,642 | 3,276 | 27,788 | 0.28% | 0 | 0 | 0 | 0 | 0 |
| National Democratic Party of Germany | NPD | 5,379 | 4,449 | 2,432 | 6,468 | 2,559 | 21,287 | 0.22% | 0 | 0 | 0 | 0 | 0 |
| Democracy in Motion | DiB | 2,143 | 4,227 | 1,128 | 3,461 | 1,243 | 12,202 | 0.12% | 0 | 0 | 0 | 0 | 0 |
| Ecological Democratic Party | ÖDP | 2,465 | 3,584 | 1,556 | 2,593 | 1,846 | 12,044 | 0.12% | 0 | 0 | 0 | 0 | 0 |
| V-Partei3 | V | 2,001 | 2,872 | 1,325 | 3,195 | 1,120 | 10,513 | 0.11% | 0 | 0 | 0 | 0 | 0 |
| Basic Income Alliance | BGE | 1,905 | 3,019 | 1,221 | 2,801 | 1,025 | 9,971 | 0.10% | 0 | 0 | 0 | 0 | 0 |
| German Centre | DM | 1,840 | 2,463 | 1,521 | 2,869 | 1,166 | 9,859 | 0.10% | 0 | 0 | 0 | 0 | 0 |
| From Now... Democracy by Referendum | | 2,012 | 2,945 | 1,149 | 2,443 | 1,082 | 9,631 | 0.10% | 0 | 0 | 0 | 0 | 0 |
| Party for Health Research | | 2,145 | 2,028 | 1,116 | 2,565 | 1,189 | 9,043 | 0.09% | 0 | 0 | 0 | 0 | 0 |
| Marxist–Leninist Party of Germany | MLPD | 1,414 | 1,140 | 448 | 2,325 | 1,098 | 6,425 | 0.07% | 0 | 0 | 0 | 0 | 0 |
| Party of Humanists | PdH | 1,113 | 1,845 | 644 | 1,702 | 687 | 5,991 | 0.06% | 0 | 0 | 0 | 0 | 0 |
| German Communist Party | DKP | 437 | 355 | 165 | 705 | 555 | 2,217 | 0.02% | 0 | 0 | 0 | 0 | 0 |
| Socialist Equality Party | SGP | 182 | 192 | 94 | 253 | 97 | 818 | 0.01% | 0 | 0 | 0 | 0 | 0 |
| Valid votes | | 1,966,424 | 2,480,132 | 1,310,132 | 2,757,746 | 1,338,943 | 9,853,377 | 100.00% | 64 | 64 | 14 | 78 | 142 |
| Rejected votes | | 17,153 | 20,592 | 12,404 | 24,673 | 10,262 | 85,084 | 0.86% | | | | | |
| Total polled | | 1,983,577 | 2,500,724 | 1,322,536 | 2,782,419 | 1,349,205 | 9,938,461 | 75.44% | | | | | |
| Registered electors | | 2,674,542 | 3,249,261 | 1,754,157 | 3,736,990 | 1,759,627 | 13,174,577 | | | | | | |
| Turnout | | 74.17% | 76.96% | 75.39% | 74.46% | 76.68% | 75.44% | | | | | | |

The following candidates were elected:

- State seats - Ingrid Arndt-Brauer (SPD); Olaf in der Beek (FDP); Matthias Birkwald (Linke); Ralf Brauksiepe (CDU); Marco Buschmann (FDP); Karlheinz Busen (FDP); Carl-Julius Cronenberg (FDP); Sevim Dağdelen (Linke); Bernhard Daldrup (SPD); Bijan Djir-Sarai (FDP); Katja Dörner (Grüne); Marie-Luise Dött (CDU); Katharina Dröge (Grüne); Berengar Elsner von Gronow (AfD); Michael Espendiller (AfD); Otto Fricke (FDP); Sylvia Gabelmann (Linke); Kai Gehring (Grüne); Kay Gottschalk (AfD); Alexander Graf Lambsdorff (FDP); Kerstin Griese (SPD); Sebastian Hartmann (SPD); Roland Hartwig (AfD); Britta Haßelmann (Grüne); Jochen Haug (AfD); Katrin Helling-Plahr (FDP); Wolfgang Hellmich (SPD); Udo Hemmelgarn (AfD); Barbara Hendricks (SPD); Markus Herbrand (FDP); Reinhard Houben (FDP); Andrej Hunko (Linke); Fabian Jacobi (AfD); Ulla Jelpke (Linke); Uwe Kamann (AfD); Stefan Keuter (AfD); Maria Klein-Schmeink (Grüne); Katharina Kloke (FDP); Elvan Korkmaz (SPD); Oliver Krischer (Grüne); Markus Kurth (Grüne); Sven Lehmann (Grüne); Christian Lindner (FDP); Rüdiger Lucassen (AfD); Mario Mieruch (AfD); Irene Mihalic (Grüne); Niema Movassat (Linke); Roman Müller-Böhm (FDP); Alexander Neu (Linke); Dietmar Nietan (SPD); Friedrich Ostendorff (Grüne); Ingrid Remmers (Linke); Martin Renner (AfD); Bernd Reuther (FDP); Andreas Rimkus (SPD); Christian Sauter (FDP); Frank Schäffler (FDP); Ulle Schauws (Grüne); Udo Schiefner (SPD); Frithjof Schmidt (Grüne); Ulla Schmidt (SPD); Jörg Schneider (AfD); Ursula Schulte (SPD); Martin Schulz (SPD); Marie-Agnes Strack-Zimmermann (FDP); Friedrich Straetmanns (Linke); Manfred Todtenhausen (FDP); Johannes Vogel (FDP); Kathrin Vogler (Linke); Sahra Wagenknecht (Linke); Nicole Westig (FDP); Harald Weyel (AfD); Dirk Wiese (SPD); Uwe Witt (AfD); Oliver Wittke (CDU); Gülistan Yüksel (SPD); Hubertus Zdebel (Linke); and Paul Ziemiak (CDU).

Substitutions:

- Ralf Brauksiepe (CDU) resigned on 4 November 2018 and was replaced by Gisela Manderla (CDU) on 5 November 2018.
- Katja Dörner (Grüne) resigned on 31 October 2020 and was replaced by Janosch Dahmen (Grüne) on 12 November 2020.
- Oliver Wittke (CDU) resigned on 30 April 2021 and was replaced by Tim Ostermann (CDU) on 1 May 2021.
- Ingrid Remmers (Linke) died on 9 August 2021 and was replaced by Zeki Gökhan (Linke) on 19 August 2021.

Additional state seats following vacation of constituency seats:

- Ulrich Kelber (SPD, Bonn) resigned on 6 January 2019 and was replaced by Nezahat Baradari (SPD) on 7 January 2019.

===== 2013 =====
Results of the 2013 federal election held on 22 September 2013:

| Party | | Second votes per region | | | | | Total votes | % | Seats | | | | |
| Party | | Arnsberg | Cologne | Detmold | Düssel- dorf | Münster | Total votes | % | Con. | State | | | Tot. |
| Party | | Arnsberg | Cologne | Detmold | Düssel- dorf | Münster | Total votes | % | Con. | Ini. | Lev. | Ele. | Tot. |
|---|---|---|---|---|---|---|---|---|---|---|---|---|---|
| Christian Democratic Union of Germany | CDU | 711,237 | 954,745 | 471,638 | 1,035,898 | 603,045 | 3,776,563 | 39.76% | 37 | 22 | 4 | 26 | 63 |
| Social Democratic Party of Germany | SPD | 683,872 | 664,995 | 341,903 | 864,699 | 472,813 | 3,028,282 | 31.88% | 27 | 21 | 4 | 25 | 52 |
| Alliance 90/The Greens | Grüne | 137,891 | 225,732 | 88,517 | 198,954 | 109,548 | 760,642 | 8.01% | 0 | 12 | 1 | 13 | 13 |
| Die Linke | Linke | 122,521 | 145,544 | 63,052 | 174,119 | 77,689 | 582,925 | 6.14% | 0 | 9 | 1 | 10 | 10 |
| Free Democratic Party | FDP | 82,515 | 146,301 | 50,624 | 150,007 | 68,580 | 498,027 | 5.24% | 0 | 0 | 0 | 0 | 0 |
| Alternative for Germany | AfD | 76,777 | 93,052 | 38,963 | 114,702 | 48,764 | 372,258 | 3.92% | 0 | 0 | 0 | 0 | 0 |
| Pirate Party Germany | Piraten | 42,312 | 55,259 | 22,535 | 60,487 | 28,914 | 209,507 | 2.21% | 0 | 0 | 0 | 0 | 0 |
| National Democratic Party of Germany | NPD | 21,893 | 18,937 | 8,287 | 31,921 | 13,253 | 94,291 | 0.99% | 0 | 0 | 0 | 0 | 0 |
| Die PARTEI | | 7,086 | 11,895 | 3,304 | 10,937 | 4,554 | 37,776 | 0.40% | 0 | 0 | 0 | 0 | 0 |
| Free Voters | FW | 5,583 | 7,242 | 3,794 | 5,783 | 2,725 | 25,127 | 0.26% | 0 | 0 | 0 | 0 | 0 |
| Pro Germany Citizens' Movement | | 4,789 | 5,682 | 1,852 | 7,869 | 3,051 | 23,243 | 0.24% | 0 | 0 | 0 | 0 | 0 |
| From Now... Democracy by Referendum | | 3,886 | 5,027 | 1,793 | 4,879 | 2,037 | 17,622 | 0.19% | 0 | 0 | 0 | 0 | 0 |
| The Republicans | REP | 2,889 | 3,038 | 1,079 | 4,988 | 1,854 | 13,848 | 0.15% | 0 | 0 | 0 | 0 | 0 |
| Ecological Democratic Party | ÖDP | 2,285 | 3,486 | 1,797 | 3,174 | 2,236 | 12,978 | 0.14% | 0 | 0 | 0 | 0 | 0 |
| Party of the Non-Voters | | 2,031 | 3,596 | 1,082 | 3,239 | 1,401 | 11,349 | 0.12% | 0 | 0 | 0 | 0 | 0 |
| Alliance for Innovation and Justice | BIG | 2,316 | 3,178 | 677 | 3,240 | 1,294 | 10,705 | 0.11% | 0 | 0 | 0 | 0 | 0 |
| Party of Reason | PdV | 1,338 | 1,964 | 715 | 1,906 | 965 | 6,888 | 0.07% | 0 | 0 | 0 | 0 | 0 |
| Alliance 21/Pensioners' Party | | 1,216 | 1,111 | 559 | 1,621 | 644 | 5,151 | 0.05% | 0 | 0 | 0 | 0 | 0 |
| Marxist–Leninist Party of Germany | MLPD | 1,098 | 625 | 249 | 1,704 | 924 | 4,600 | 0.05% | 0 | 0 | 0 | 0 | 0 |
| The Right | | 629 | 435 | 173 | 703 | 305 | 2,245 | 0.02% | 0 | 0 | 0 | 0 | 0 |
| Party for Social Equality | PSG | 476 | 462 | 248 | 641 | 328 | 2,155 | 0.02% | 0 | 0 | 0 | 0 | 0 |
| Bürgerrechtsbewegung Solidarität | BüSo | 327 | 481 | 176 | 779 | 212 | 1,975 | 0.02% | 0 | 0 | 0 | 0 | 0 |
| Valid votes | | 1,914,967 | 2,352,787 | 1,103,017 | 2,682,250 | 1,445,136 | 9,498,157 | 100.00% | 64 | 64 | 10 | 74 | 138 |
| Rejected votes | | 21,786 | 28,561 | 12,894 | 29,838 | 14,011 | 107,090 | 1.11% | | | | | |
| Total polled | | 1,936,753 | 2,381,348 | 1,115,911 | 2,712,088 | 1,459,147 | 9,605,247 | 72.47% | | | | | |
| Registered electors | | 2,718,831 | 3,230,011 | 1,551,211 | 3,779,917 | 1,973,584 | 13,253,554 | | | | | | |
| Turnout | | 71.23% | 73.73% | 71.94% | 71.75% | 73.93% | 72.47% | | | | | | |

The following candidates were elected:

- State seats - Ingrid Arndt-Brauer (SPD); Volker Beck (Grüne); Matthias Birkwald (Linke); Burkhard Blienert (SPD); Willi Brase (SPD); Ralf Brauksiepe (CDU); Cajus Julius Caesar (CDU); Petra Crone (SPD); Bernhard Daldrup (SPD); Sevim Dağdelen (Linke); Katja Dörner (Grüne); Marie-Luise Dött (CDU); Katharina Dröge (Grüne); Jutta Eckenbach (CDU); Michaela Engelmeier-Heite (SPD); Ingrid Fischbach (CDU); Kai Gehring (Grüne); Cemile Giousouf (CDU); Kerstin Griese (SPD); Ulrich Hampel (SPD); Sebastian Hartmann (SPD); Britta Haßelmann (Grüne); Wolfgang Hellmich (SPD); Barbara Hendricks (SPD); Peter Hintze (CDU); Petra Hinz (SPD); Inge Höger (Linke); Bärbel Höhn (Grüne); Andrej Hunko (Linke); Hubert Hüppe (CDU); Ulla Jelpke (Linke); Sylvia Jörrißen (CDU); Steffen Kanitz (CDU); Maria Klein-Schmeink (Grüne); Oliver Krischer (Grüne); Hans-Ulrich Krüger (SPD); Helga Kühn-Mengel (SPD); Markus Kurth (Grüne); Norbert Lammert (CDU); Claudia Lücking-Michel (CDU); Thomas Mahlberg (CDU); Gisela Manderla (CDU); Irene Mihalic (Grüne); Philipp Mißfelder (CDU); Karsten Möring (CDU); Niema Movassat (Linke); Alexander Neu (Linke); Dietmar Nietan (SPD); Helmut Nowak (CDU); Friedrich Ostendorff (Grüne); Tim Ostermann (CDU); Achim Post (SPD); Kerstin Radomski (CDU); Andreas Rimkus (SPD); Ulle Schauws (Grüne); Udo Schiefner (SPD); Frithjof Schmidt (Grüne); Ulla Schmidt (SPD); Ursula Schulte (SPD); Norbert Spinrath (SPD); Peer Steinbrück (SPD); Rita Stockhofe (CDU); Christoph Strässer (SPD); Lena Strothmann (CDU); Astrid Timmermann-Fechter (CDU); Kathrin Vogler (Linke); Sven Volmering (CDU); Christel Voßbeck-Kayser (CDU); Sahra Wagenknecht (Linke); Dirk Wiese (SPD); Oliver Wittke (CDU); Gülistan Yüksel (SPD); Hubertus Zdebel (Linke); and Heinrich Zertik (CDU).

Substitutions:

- Philipp Mißfelder (CDU) died on 13 July 2015 and was replaced by Volker Mosblech (CDU) on 20 July 2015.
- Petra Hinz (SPD) resigned on 1 September 2016 and was replaced by Jürgen Coße (SPD) on the same day.
- Peer Steinbrück (SPD) resigned on 1 October 2016 and was replaced by Bettina Bähr-Losse (SPD) on the same day.
- Peter Hintze (CDU) died on 26 November 2016 and was replaced by Mathias Edwin Höschel (CDU) on 7 December 2016.

Additional state seats following vacation of constituency seats:

- Ronald Pofalla (CDU, Kleve) resigned on 1 January 2015 and was replaced by Thorsten Hoffmann (CDU) on the same day.
- Christina Kampmann (SPD, Bielefeld – Gütersloh II) resigned on 1 October 2015 and was replaced by Elfi Scho-Antwerpes (SPD) on the same day.
- Dirk Becker (SPD, Lippe I) resigned on 21 October 2015 and was replaced by Petra Rode-Bosse (SPD) on the same day.
- Steffen Kampeter (CDU, Minden-Lübbecke I) resigned on 6 July 2016 and was replaced by Karl-Heinz Wange (CDU) on the same day.

==== 2000s ====
===== 2009 =====
Results of the 2009 federal election held on 27 September 2009:

| Party | | Second votes per region | | | | | Total votes | % | Seats | | |
| Party | | Arnsberg | Cologne | Detmold | Düssel- dorf | Münster | Total votes | % | Con. | Stat. | Tot. |
|---|---|---|---|---|---|---|---|---|---|---|---|
| Christian Democratic Union of Germany | CDU | 596,897 | 770,475 | 396,692 | 845,318 | 502,096 | 3,111,478 | 33.14% | 37 | 8 | 45 |
| Social Democratic Party of Germany | SPD | 612,748 | 560,852 | 320,792 | 766,154 | 418,410 | 2,678,956 | 28.53% | 27 | 12 | 39 |
| Free Democratic Party | FDP | 255,483 | 391,041 | 153,253 | 400,911 | 193,866 | 1,394,554 | 14.85% | 0 | 20 | 20 |
| Alliance 90/The Greens | Grüne | 178,107 | 274,085 | 103,292 | 260,111 | 130,236 | 945,831 | 10.07% | 0 | 14 | 14 |
| Die Linke | Linke | 180,015 | 180,213 | 80,974 | 234,708 | 113,904 | 789,814 | 8.41% | 0 | 11 | 11 |
| Pirate Party Germany | Piraten | 31,372 | 41,587 | 19,028 | 43,818 | 22,780 | 158,585 | 1.69% | 0 | 0 | 0 |
| National Democratic Party of Germany | NPD | 21,339 | 21,412 | 8,464 | 25,665 | 11,810 | 88,690 | 0.94% | 0 | 0 | 0 |
| Human Environment Animal Protection Party | | 13,442 | 14,953 | 5,731 | 18,191 | 7,414 | 59,731 | 0.64% | 0 | 0 | 0 |
| Family Party of Germany | | 9,684 | 9,887 | 6,182 | 12,921 | 6,432 | 45,106 | 0.48% | 0 | 0 | 0 |
| Pensioners' Party | RENTNER | 8,770 | 7,708 | 3,153 | 10,023 | 4,167 | 33,821 | 0.36% | 0 | 0 | 0 |
| The Republicans | REP | 6,771 | 5,515 | 3,035 | 10,781 | 3,913 | 30,015 | 0.32% | 0 | 0 | 0 |
| Alliance 21/Pensioners' Party | | 3,159 | 3,236 | 1,151 | 3,749 | 1,657 | 12,952 | 0.14% | 0 | 0 | 0 |
| From Now... Alliance for Germany | | 1,790 | 3,337 | 940 | 2,373 | 927 | 9,367 | 0.10% | 0 | 0 | 0 |
| Ecological Democratic Party | ÖDP | 1,395 | 2,407 | 1,420 | 1,989 | 1,655 | 8,866 | 0.09% | 0 | 0 | 0 |
| German People's Union | DVU | 2,888 | 1,236 | 730 | 1,589 | 915 | 7,358 | 0.08% | 0 | 0 | 0 |
| Centre Party | Z | 998 | 1,180 | 535 | 2,541 | 833 | 6,087 | 0.06% | 0 | 0 | 0 |
| Marxist–Leninist Party of Germany | MLPD | 1,040 | 642 | 213 | 1,508 | 865 | 4,268 | 0.05% | 0 | 0 | 0 |
| Bürgerrechtsbewegung Solidarität | BüSo | 522 | 533 | 255 | 858 | 228 | 2,396 | 0.03% | 0 | 0 | 0 |
| Party for Social Equality | PSG | 358 | 318 | 190 | 478 | 193 | 1,537 | 0.02% | 0 | 0 | 0 |
| Valid votes | | 1,926,778 | 2,290,617 | 1,106,030 | 2,643,686 | 1,422,301 | 9,389,412 | 100.00% | 64 | 65 | 129 |
| Rejected votes | | 21,460 | 26,252 | 13,848 | 28,891 | 13,987 | 104,438 | 1.10% | | | |
| Total polled | | 1,948,238 | 2,316,869 | 1,119,878 | 2,672,577 | 1,436,288 | 9,493,850 | 71.45% | | | |
| Registered electors | | 2,756,052 | 3,195,322 | 1,557,841 | 3,811,666 | 1,967,410 | 13,288,291 | | | | |
| Turnout | | 70.69% | 72.51% | 71.89% | 70.12% | 73.00% | 71.45% | | | | |

The following candidates were elected:

- State seats - Ingrid Arndt-Brauer (SPD); Daniel Bahr (FDP); Volker Beck (Grüne); Matthias Birkwald (Linke); Claudia Bögel (FDP); Klaus Brandner (SPD); Willi Brase (SPD); Ralf Brauksiepe (CDU); Marco Buschmann (FDP); Petra Crone (SPD); Sevim Dağdelen (Linke); Helga Daub (FDP); Bijan Djir-Sarai (FDP); Katja Dörner (Grüne); Marie-Luise Dött (CDU); Jörg van Essen (FDP); Ingrid Fischbach (CDU); Ulrike Flach (FDP); Otto Fricke (FDP); Paul Friedhoff (FDP); Erich G. Fritz (CDU); Kai Gehring (Grüne); Britta Haßelmann (Grüne); Ursula Heinen-Esser (CDU); Barbara Hendricks (SPD); Bettina Herlitzius (Grüne); Peter Hintze (CDU); Inge Höger (Linke); Bärbel Höhn (Grüne); Werner Hoyer (FDP); Andrej Hunko (Linke); Ulla Jelpke (Linke); Heiner Kamp (FDP); Michael Kauch (FDP); Maria Klein-Schmeink (Grüne); Ute Koczy (Grüne); Gudrun Kopp (FDP); Oliver Krischer (Grüne); Markus Kurth (Grüne); Norbert Lammert (CDU); Christian Lindner (FDP); Ursula Lötzer (Linke); Philipp Mißfelder (CDU); Gabi Molitor (FDP); Niema Movassat (Linke); Kerstin Müller (Grüne); Petra Müller (FDP); Franz Müntefering (SPD); Dietmar Nietan (SPD); Friedrich Ostendorff (Grüne); Hermann E. Ott (Grüne); Gisela Piltz (FDP); Ingrid Remmers (Linke); Paul Schäfer (Linke); Frank Schäffler (FDP); Bernd Scheelen (SPD); Frithjof Schmidt (Grüne); Ulla Schmidt (SPD); Angelica Schwall-Düren (SPD); Peer Steinbrück (SPD); Christoph Strässer (SPD); Johannes Vogel (FDP); Kathrin Vogler (Linke); Sahra Wagenknecht-Niemeyer (Linke); and Guido Westerwelle (FDP).

Substitutions:

- Angelica Schwall-Düren (SPD) resigned on 15 July 2010 and was replaced by Kerstin Griese (SPD) on 23 July 2010.
- Werner Hoyer (FDP) resigned on 1 January 2012 and was replaced by Jörg von Polheim (FDP) on 4 January 2012.
- Paul Friedhoff (FDP) resigned on 1 May 2012 and was replaced by Manfred Todtenhausen (FDP) on 2 May 2012.
- Christian Lindner (FDP) resigned on 10 July 2012 and was replaced by Hans-Werner Ehrenberg (FDP) on the same day.

Additional state seats following vacation of constituency seats:

- Leo Dautzenberg (CDU, Heinsberg) resigned on 1 February 2011 and was replaced by Cajus Julius Caesar (CDU) on the same day.
- Michael Groschek (SPD, Oberhausen – Wesel III) resigned on 21 June 2012 and was replaced by Wolfgang Hellmich (SPD) on 22 June 2012.
- Jürgen Herrmann (CDU, Höxter – Gütersloh III – Lippe II) died on 11 August 2012 and was replaced by Hubert Hüppe (CDU) on 16 August 2012.

===== 2005 =====
Results of the 2005 federal election held on 18 September 2005:

| Party | | Second votes per region | | | | | Total votes | % | Seats | | |
| Party | | Arnsberg | Cologne | Detmold | Düssel- dorf | Münster | Total votes | % | Con. | Stat. | Tot. |
|---|---|---|---|---|---|---|---|---|---|---|---|
| Social Democratic Party of Germany | SPD | 938,601 | 880,936 | 446,834 | 1,195,577 | 634,164 | 4,096,112 | 39.98% | 40 | 14 | 54 |
| Christian Democratic Union of Germany | CDU | 678,044 | 853,782 | 466,798 | 964,612 | 561,115 | 3,524,351 | 34.40% | 24 | 22 | 46 |
| Free Democratic Party | FDP | 179,868 | 290,596 | 118,002 | 303,345 | 133,113 | 1,024,924 | 10.00% | 0 | 13 | 13 |
| Alliance 90/The Greens | Grüne | 141,917 | 233,795 | 87,023 | 216,870 | 102,946 | 782,551 | 7.64% | 0 | 10 | 10 |
| The Left Party.PDS | Linke | 118,214 | 122,163 | 55,824 | 160,597 | 73,169 | 529,967 | 5.17% | 0 | 7 | 7 |
| National Democratic Party of Germany | NPD | 18,392 | 18,714 | 9,393 | 23,365 | 10,648 | 80,512 | 0.79% | 0 | 0 | 0 |
| Human Environment Animal Protection Party | | 11,379 | 11,806 | 4,762 | 15,192 | 6,410 | 49,549 | 0.48% | 0 | 0 | 0 |
| Family Party of Germany | | 8,317 | 9,222 | 6,762 | 12,402 | 5,718 | 42,421 | 0.41% | 0 | 0 | 0 |
| The Grays – Gray Panthers | Graue | 6,445 | 10,203 | 2,797 | 13,427 | 4,263 | 37,135 | 0.36% | 0 | 0 | 0 |
| The Republicans | REP | 9,524 | 6,674 | 3,781 | 10,939 | 4,472 | 35,390 | 0.35% | 0 | 0 | 0 |
| Party of Bible-abiding Christians | PBC | 3,764 | 3,035 | 6,105 | 2,732 | 1,321 | 16,957 | 0.17% | 0 | 0 | 0 |
| From Now... Alliance for Germany | | 2,005 | 2,674 | 1,282 | 2,572 | 1,110 | 9,643 | 0.09% | 0 | 0 | 0 |
| Marxist–Leninist Party of Germany | MLPD | 1,515 | 697 | 304 | 2,141 | 1,158 | 5,815 | 0.06% | 0 | 0 | 0 |
| Party for Social Equality | PSG | 906 | 1,029 | 469 | 1,151 | 532 | 4,087 | 0.04% | 0 | 0 | 0 |
| Centre Party | Z | 693 | 792 | 311 | 1,613 | 601 | 4,010 | 0.04% | 0 | 0 | 0 |
| Bürgerrechtsbewegung Solidarität | BüSo | 584 | 677 | 230 | 857 | 259 | 2,607 | 0.03% | 0 | 0 | 0 |
| Valid votes | | 2,120,168 | 2,446,795 | 1,210,677 | 2,927,392 | 1,540,999 | 10,246,031 | 100.00% | 64 | 66 | 130 |
| Rejected votes | | 38,430 | 27,627 | 18,498 | 36,996 | 17,648 | 139,199 | 1.34% | | | |
| Total polled | | 2,158,598 | 2,474,422 | 1,229,175 | 2,964,388 | 1,558,647 | 10,385,230 | 78.34% | | | |
| Registered electors | | 2,779,654 | 3,148,771 | 1,551,925 | 3,823,363 | 1,953,334 | 13,257,047 | | | | |
| Turnout | | 77.66% | 78.58% | 79.20% | 77.53% | 79.79% | 78.34% | | | | |

The following candidates were elected:

- State seats - Ingrid Arndt-Brauer (SPD); Hüseyin Kenan Aydın (Linke); Daniel Bahr (FDP); Volker Beck (Grüne); Ute Berg (SPD); Kurt Bodewig (SPD); Jochen Borchert (CDU); Klaus Brandner (SPD); Helmut Brandt (CDU); Ralf Brauksiepe (CDU); Sevim Dağdelen (Linke); Marie-Luise Dött (CDU); Jörg van Essen (FDP); Ilse Falk (CDU); Ingrid Fischbach (CDU); Ulrike Flach (FDP); Otto Fricke (FDP); Paul Friedhoff (FDP); Erich G. Fritz (CDU); Kai Gehring (Grüne); Reinhard Göhner (CDU); Britta Haßelmann (Grüne); Ursula Heinen (CDU); Barbara Hendricks (SPD); Peter Hintze (CDU); Inge Höger-Neuling (Linke); Bärbel Höhn (Grüne); Eike Hovermann (SPD); Werner Hoyer (FDP); Hubert Hüppe (CDU); Ulla Jelpke (Linke); Steffen Kampeter (CDU); Michael Kauch (FDP); Ute Koczy (Grüne); Norbert Königshofen (CDU); Gudrun Kopp (FDP); Helga Kühn-Mengel (SPD); Markus Kurth (Grüne); Oskar Lafontaine (Linke); Norbert Lammert (CDU); Reinhard Loske (Grüne); Ursula Lötzer (Linke); Wolfgang Meckelburg (CDU); Ulrike Merten (SPD); Laurenz Meyer (CDU); Philipp Mißfelder (CDU); Kerstin Müller (Grüne); Michael Müller (SPD); Franz Müntefering (SPD); Winfried Nachtwei (Grüne); Detlef Parr (FDP); Beatrix Philipp (CDU); Gisela Piltz (FDP); Ruprecht Polenz (CDU); Paul Schäfer (Linke); Frank Schäffler (FDP); Bernd Scheelen (SPD); Irmingard Schewe-Gerigk (Grüne); Konrad Schily (FDP); Andreas Schmidt (CDU); Dagmar Schmidt (SPD); Reinhard Schultz (SPD); Angelica Schwall-Düren (SPD); Lena Strothmann (CDU); Guido Westerwelle (FDP); and Willi Zylajew (CDU).

Substitutions:

- Dagmar Schmidt (SPD) died on 9 November 2005 and was replaced by Christoph Pries (SPD) on 16 November 2005.
- Reinhard Göhner (CDU) resigned on 7 July 2007 and was replaced by Cajus Julius Caesar (CDU) on 9 July 2007.
- Reinhard Loske (Grüne) resigned on 1 September 2007 and was replaced by Bettina Herlitzius (Grüne) on 3 September 2007.

Additional state seats following vacation of constituency seats:

- Peter Paziorek (CDU, Warendorf) resigned on 1 September 2007 and was replaced by Stephan Eisel (CDU) on 3 September 2007.
- Hildegard Müller (CDU, Düsseldorf I) resigned on 1 October 2008 and was replaced by Thomas Mahlberg (CDU) on 7 October 2008.
- Rainer Wend (SPD, Bielefeld) resigned on 1 April 2009 and was replaced by Hildegard Wester (SPD) on the same day.

===== 2002 =====
Results of the 2002 federal election held on 22 September 2002:

| Party | | Second votes per region | | | | | Total votes | % | Seats | | |
| Party | | Arnsberg | Cologne | Detmold | Düssel- dorf | Münster | Total votes | % | Con. | Stat. | Tot. |
|---|---|---|---|---|---|---|---|---|---|---|---|
| Social Democratic Party of Germany | SPD | 1,037,036 | 960,810 | 495,596 | 1,321,629 | 684,317 | 4,499,388 | 42.96% | 45 | 15 | 60 |
| Christian Democratic Union of Germany | CDU | 721,707 | 901,162 | 486,066 | 1,005,899 | 560,898 | 3,675,732 | 35.10% | 19 | 30 | 49 |
| Free Democratic Party | FDP | 183,825 | 251,251 | 109,037 | 290,895 | 143,833 | 978,841 | 9.35% | 0 | 13 | 13 |
| Alliance 90/The Greens | Grüne | 170,786 | 268,379 | 102,498 | 266,158 | 122,863 | 930,684 | 8.89% | 0 | 12 | 12 |
| Party of Democratic Socialism | PDS | 26,752 | 30,414 | 12,891 | 39,689 | 15,700 | 125,446 | 1.20% | 0 | 0 | 0 |
| Party for a Rule of Law Offensive | Schill | 15,166 | 12,664 | 11,097 | 21,894 | 10,172 | 70,993 | 0.68% | 0 | 0 | 0 |
| The Republicans | REP | 11,100 | 7,714 | 4,451 | 11,642 | 5,762 | 40,669 | 0.39% | 0 | 0 | 0 |
| Human Environment Animal Protection Party | | 8,588 | 8,835 | 3,751 | 12,103 | 4,869 | 38,146 | 0.36% | 0 | 0 | 0 |
| National Democratic Party of Germany | NPD | 6,262 | 5,927 | 2,601 | 7,806 | 3,287 | 25,883 | 0.25% | 0 | 0 | 0 |
| Family Party of Germany | | 4,707 | 4,602 | 3,175 | 6,919 | 3,417 | 22,820 | 0.22% | 0 | 0 | 0 |
| The Grays – Gray Panthers | Graue | 4,225 | 6,122 | 1,643 | 7,754 | 2,455 | 22,199 | 0.21% | 0 | 0 | 0 |
| Party of Bible-abiding Christians | PBC | 3,715 | 2,794 | 4,623 | 3,237 | 989 | 15,358 | 0.15% | 0 | 0 | 0 |
| Feminist Party of Germany | | 1,984 | 2,111 | 973 | 2,820 | 1,338 | 9,226 | 0.09% | 0 | 0 | 0 |
| Ecological Democratic Party | ÖDP | 921 | 1,052 | 826 | 1,055 | 957 | 4,811 | 0.05% | 0 | 0 | 0 |
| Christian Centre | CM | 1,015 | 926 | 609 | 1,005 | 561 | 4,116 | 0.04% | 0 | 0 | 0 |
| Centre Party | Z | 511 | 600 | 232 | 1,269 | 515 | 3,127 | 0.03% | 0 | 0 | 0 |
| The Violets | | 550 | 586 | 201 | 794 | 281 | 2,412 | 0.02% | 0 | 0 | 0 |
| Bürgerrechtsbewegung Solidarität | BüSo | 274 | 401 | 187 | 532 | 167 | 1,561 | 0.01% | 0 | 0 | 0 |
| Humanist Party | HP | 238 | 319 | 88 | 395 | 108 | 1,148 | 0.01% | 0 | 0 | 0 |
| Valid votes | | 2,199,362 | 2,466,669 | 1,240,545 | 3,003,495 | 1,562,489 | 10,472,560 | 100.00% | 64 | 70 | 134 |
| Rejected votes | | 23,677 | 22,724 | 15,633 | 31,297 | 15,520 | 108,851 | 1.03% | | | |
| Total polled | | 2,223,039 | 2,489,393 | 1,256,178 | 3,034,792 | 1,578,009 | 10,581,411 | 80.29% | | | |
| Registered electors | | 2,784,370 | 3,091,419 | 1,536,592 | 3,830,379 | 1,936,331 | 13,179,091 | | | | |
| Turnout | | 79.84% | 80.53% | 81.75% | 79.23% | 81.49% | 80.29% | | | | |

The following candidates were elected:

- State seats - Ingrid Arndt-Brauer (SPD); Daniel Bahr (FDP); Volker Beck (Grüne); Ute Berg (SPD); Rolf Bietmann (CDU); Jochen Borchert (CDU); Klaus Brandner (SPD); Ralf Brauksiepe (CDU); Paul Breuer (CDU); Cajus Julius Caesar (CDU); Helga Daub (FDP); Marie-Luise Dött (CDU); Jutta Dümpe-Krüger (Grüne); Jörg van Essen (FDP); Ilse Falk (CDU); Ingrid Fischbach (CDU); Ulrike Flach (FDP); Otto Fricke (FDP); Erich G. Fritz (CDU); Reinhard Göhner (CDU); Hermann Gröhe (CDU); Ursula Heinen (CDU); Barbara Hendricks (SPD); Peter Hintze (CDU); Eike Hovermann (SPD); Werner Hoyer (FDP); Hubert Hüppe (CDU); Michaele Hustedt (Grüne); Steffen Kampeter (CDU); Irmgard Karwatzki (CDU); Hans-Peter Kemper (SPD); Norbert Königshofen (CDU); Gudrun Kopp (FDP); Helga Kühn-Mengel (SPD); Markus Kurth (Grüne); Norbert Lammert (CDU); Karl-Josef Laumann (CDU); Ursula Lietz (CDU); Reinhard Loske (Grüne); Erwin Marschewski (CDU); Wolfgang Meckelburg (CDU); Ulrike Merten (SPD); Laurenz Meyer (CDU); Jürgen Möllemann (FDP); Hildegard Müller (CDU); Kerstin Müller (Grüne); Franz Müntefering (SPD); Winfried Nachtwei (Grüne); Christa Nickels (Grüne); Günther Friedrich Nolting (FDP); Friedrich Ostendorff (Grüne); Detlef Parr (FDP); Beatrix Philipp (CDU); Andreas Pinkwart (FDP); Ruprecht Polenz (CDU); Simone Probst (Grüne); Thomas Rachel (CDU); Bernd Scheelen (SPD); Irmingard Schewe-Gerigk (Grüne); Andreas Schmidt (CDU); Dagmar Schmidt (SPD); Walter Schöler (SPD); Reinhard Schultz (SPD); Angelica Schwall-Düren (SPD); Michaela Tadjadod (CDU); Ludger Volmer (Grüne); Guido Westerwelle (FDP); Ingo Wolf (FDP); Christoph Zöpel (SPD); and Willi Zylajew (CDU).

Substitutions:

- Ingo Wolf (FDP) resigned on 8 November 2002 and was replaced by Gisela Piltz (FDP) on 11 November 2002.
- Jürgen Möllemann (FDP) died on 5 June 2003 and was replaced by Michael Kauch (FDP) on 14 June 2003.
- Paul Breuer (CDU) resigned on 27 June 2003 and was replaced by Lena Strothmann (CDU) on 3 July 2003.
- Karl-Josef Laumann (CDU) resigned on 28 June 2005 and was replaced by Helmut Brandt (CDU) on the same day.
- Andreas Pinkwart (FDP) resigned on 28 June 2005 and was replaced by Michael Terwiesche (FDP) on the same day.

Additional state seats following vacation of constituency seats:

- Ernst Küchler (SPD, Leverkusen – Cologne IV) resigned on 15 October 2004 and was replaced by Martina Eickhoff (SPD) on 18 October 2004.
- Jochen Welt (SPD, Recklinghausen I) resigned on 22 October 2004 and was replaced by Hildegard Wester (SPD) on 25 October 2004.

==== 1990s ====
===== 1998 =====
Results of the 1998 federal election held on 27 September 1998:

| Party | | Second votes per region | | | | | Total votes | % | Seats | | |
| Party | | Arnsberg | Cologne | Detmold | Düssel- dorf | Münster | Total votes | % | Con. | Stat. | Tot. |
|---|---|---|---|---|---|---|---|---|---|---|---|
| Social Democratic Party of Germany | SPD | 1,188,692 | 1,070,026 | 552,049 | 1,519,151 | 767,507 | 5,097,425 | 46.90% | 53 | 19 | 72 |
| Christian Democratic Union of Germany | CDU | 717,883 | 913,908 | 474,921 | 1,006,338 | 555,974 | 3,669,024 | 33.76% | 18 | 34 | 52 |
| Free Democratic Party | FDP | 138,864 | 212,640 | 92,722 | 238,465 | 107,054 | 789,745 | 7.27% | 0 | 11 | 11 |
| Alliance 90/The Greens | Grüne | 139,226 | 210,505 | 82,368 | 207,906 | 105,906 | 745,911 | 6.86% | 0 | 11 | 11 |
| Party of Democratic Socialism | PDS | 28,265 | 30,786 | 13,824 | 41,495 | 17,180 | 131,550 | 1.21% | 0 | 2 | 2 |
| The Republicans | REP | 33,192 | 21,724 | 11,900 | 32,668 | 14,124 | 113,608 | 1.05% | 0 | 0 | 0 |
| German People's Union | DVU | 23,441 | 19,957 | 11,543 | 31,391 | 12,400 | 98,732 | 0.91% | 0 | 0 | 0 |
| Initiative Pro D-Mark | Pro DM | 13,949 | 9,924 | 6,546 | 15,668 | 8,235 | 54,322 | 0.50% | 0 | 0 | 0 |
| The Grays – Gray Panthers | Graue | 6,075 | 9,501 | 2,834 | 12,320 | 3,439 | 34,169 | 0.31% | 0 | 0 | 0 |
| Human Environment Animal Protection Party | | 5,968 | 6,879 | 2,583 | 8,476 | 3,414 | 27,320 | 0.25% | 0 | 0 | 0 |
| Family Party of Germany | | 4,767 | 4,452 | 2,752 | 6,178 | 2,930 | 21,079 | 0.19% | 0 | 0 | 0 |
| National Democratic Party of Germany | NPD | 2,961 | 2,938 | 1,438 | 3,429 | 1,550 | 12,316 | 0.11% | 0 | 0 | 0 |
| Party of Bible-abiding Christians | PBC | 2,255 | 2,345 | 2,413 | 2,051 | 651 | 9,715 | 0.09% | 0 | 0 | 0 |
| Federation of Free Citizens | BfB | 2,392 | 2,050 | 2,338 | 2,237 | 609 | 9,626 | 0.09% | 0 | 0 | 0 |
| Anarchist Pogo Party of Germany | APPD | 1,914 | 1,987 | 997 | 2,605 | 1,216 | 8,719 | 0.08% | 0 | 0 | 0 |
| Party of the Non-Voters | | 1,206 | 2,208 | 692 | 2,053 | 668 | 6,827 | 0.06% | 0 | 0 | 0 |
| Ecological Democratic Party | ÖDP | 1,154 | 1,445 | 1,321 | 1,485 | 1,239 | 6,644 | 0.06% | 0 | 0 | 0 |
| From Now... Alliance for Germany | | 1,410 | 1,589 | 802 | 1,692 | 703 | 6,196 | 0.06% | 0 | 0 | 0 |
| Chance 2000 | | 1,188 | 1,525 | 596 | 2,057 | 662 | 6,028 | 0.06% | 0 | 0 | 0 |
| Christian Centre | CM | 1,595 | 1,023 | 851 | 1,247 | 828 | 5,544 | 0.05% | 0 | 0 | 0 |
| Natural Law Party | | 1,307 | 1,237 | 529 | 1,506 | 520 | 5,099 | 0.05% | 0 | 0 | 0 |
| Feminist Party of Germany | | 900 | 1,252 | 435 | 1,612 | 630 | 4,829 | 0.04% | 0 | 0 | 0 |
| Marxist–Leninist Party of Germany | MLPD | 497 | 270 | 79 | 820 | 386 | 2,052 | 0.02% | 0 | 0 | 0 |
| Bürgerrechtsbewegung Solidarität | BüSo | 388 | 586 | 166 | 646 | 155 | 1,941 | 0.02% | 0 | 0 | 0 |
| Party for Social Equality | PSG | 225 | 285 | 97 | 380 | 127 | 1,114 | 0.01% | 0 | 0 | 0 |
| Valid votes | | 2,319,714 | 2,531,042 | 1,266,796 | 3,143,876 | 1,608,107 | 10,869,535 | 100.00% | 71 | 77 | 148 |
| Rejected votes | | 24,853 | 27,123 | 15,987 | 31,451 | 15,527 | 114,941 | 1.05% | | | |
| Total polled | | 2,344,567 | 2,558,165 | 1,282,783 | 3,175,327 | 1,623,634 | 10,984,476 | 83.94% | | | |
| Registered electors | | 2,788,417 | 3,038,803 | 1,511,553 | 3,838,665 | 1,908,959 | 13,086,397 | | | | |
| Turnout | | 84.08% | 84.18% | 84.87% | 82.72% | 85.05% | 83.94% | | | | |

The following candidates were elected:

- State seats - Volker Beck (Grüne); Joseph-Theodor Blank (CDU); Heribert Blens (CDU); Norbert Blüm (CDU); Kurt Bodewig (SPD); Jochen Borchert (CDU); Klaus Brandner (SPD); Anni Brandt-Elsweier (SPD); Willi Brase (SPD); Ralf Brauksiepe (CDU); Paul Breuer (CDU); Rainer Brinkmann (SPD); Annelie Buntenbach (Grüne); Cajus Julius Caesar (CDU); Wolf-Michael Catenhusen (SPD); Renate Diemers (CDU); Marie-Luise Dött (CDU); Jörg van Essen (FDP); Ilse Falk (CDU); Ingrid Fischbach (CDU); Ulrike Flach (FDP); Paul Friedhoff (FDP); Erich G. Fritz (CDU); Reinhard Göhner (CDU); Ursula Heinen (CDU); Barbara Hendricks (SPD); Peter Hintze (CDU); Werner Hoyer (FDP); Hubert Hüppe (CDU); Michaele Hustedt (Grüne); Ulla Jelpke (PDS); Steffen Kampeter (CDU); Irmgard Karwatzki (CDU); Hans-Peter Kemper (SPD); Norbert Königshofen (CDU); Gudrun Kopp (FDP); Karin Kortmann (SPD); Helga Kühn-Mengel (SPD); Karl Lamers (CDU); Norbert Lammert (CDU); Karl-Josef Laumann (CDU); Ursula Lietz (CDU); Wolfgang Lohmann (CDU); Reinhard Loske (Grüne); Ursula Lötzer (PDS); Erwin Marschewski (CDU); Ingrid Matthäus-Maier (SPD); Wolfgang Meckelburg (CDU); Ulrike Merten (SPD); Jürgen Möllemann (FDP); Kerstin Müller (Grüne); Franz Müntefering (SPD); Winfried Nachtwei (Grüne); Christa Nickels (Grüne); Günther Friedrich Nolting (FDP); Detlef Parr (FDP); Beatrix Philipp (CDU); Simone Probst (Grüne); Dieter Pützhofen (CDU); Thomas Rachel (CDU); Margot von Renesse (SPD); Jürgen Rüttgers (CDU); Heinz Schemken (CDU); Irmingard Schewe-Gerigk (Grüne); Andreas Schmidt (CDU); Dagmar Schmidt (SPD); Hans Peter Schmitz (CDU); Walter Schöler (SPD); Wolfgang Schulhoff (CDU); Reinhard Schultz (SPD); Gerhard Schüßler (FDP); Irmgard Schwaetzer (FDP); Angelica Schwall-Düren (SPD); Christian Simmert (Grüne); Ludger Volmer (Grüne); Guido Westerwelle (FDP); and Christoph Zöpel (SPD).

Substitutions:

- Ingrid Matthäus-Maier (SPD) resigned on 1 July 1999 and was replaced by Ingrid Arndt-Brauer (SPD) on the same day.
- Dieter Pützhofen (CDU) resigned on 30 September 1999 and was replaced by Horst Günther (CDU) on 1 October 1999.
- Jürgen Möllemann (FDP) resigned on 5 June 2000 and was replaced by Ina Albowitz (FDP) on 6 June 2000.
- Jürgen Rüttgers (CDU) resigned on 5 June 2000 and was replaced by Bernd Wilz (CDU) on 14 June 2000.

Additional state seats following vacation of constituency seats:

- Willfried Penner (SPD, Wuppertal II) resigned on 11 May 2000 and was replaced by Kerstin Griese (SPD) on the same day.
- Rudolf Dreßler (SPD, Wuppertal I) resigned on 31 August 2000 and was replaced by Ulrich Kelber (SPD) on 1 September 2000.
- Norbert Hauser (CDU, Bonn) resigned on 9 April 2002 and was replaced by Detlef Helling (CDU) on 10 April 2002.

===== 1994 =====
Results of the 1994 federal election held on 16 October 1994:

| Party | | Second votes per region | | | | | Total votes | % | Seats | | |
| Party | | Arnsberg | Cologne | Detmold | Düssel- dorf | Münster | Total votes | % | Con. | Stat. | Tot. |
|---|---|---|---|---|---|---|---|---|---|---|---|
| Social Democratic Party of Germany | SPD | 1,079,713 | 947,313 | 477,471 | 1,362,896 | 667,427 | 4,534,820 | 43.13% | 40 | 26 | 66 |
| Christian Democratic Union of Germany | CDU | 803,162 | 978,718 | 501,465 | 1,111,674 | 602,298 | 3,997,317 | 38.02% | 31 | 27 | 58 |
| Free Democratic Party | FDP | 142,426 | 214,294 | 91,067 | 249,962 | 106,275 | 804,024 | 7.65% | 0 | 12 | 12 |
| Alliance 90/The Greens | Grüne | 144,095 | 215,227 | 91,045 | 221,799 | 109,239 | 781,405 | 7.43% | 0 | 11 | 11 |
| The Republicans | REP | 35,288 | 30,975 | 13,552 | 41,401 | 17,337 | 138,553 | 1.32% | 0 | 0 | 0 |
| Party of Democratic Socialism | PDS | 20,256 | 25,874 | 10,621 | 33,223 | 12,382 | 102,356 | 0.97% | 0 | 1 | 1 |
| The Grays – Gray Panthers | Graue | 10,633 | 13,266 | 4,241 | 18,863 | 5,396 | 52,399 | 0.50% | 0 | 0 | 0 |
| Human Environment Animal Protection Party | | 7,138 | 8,215 | 3,394 | 9,459 | 4,101 | 32,307 | 0.31% | 0 | 0 | 0 |
| Statt Party | STATT | 5,207 | 5,664 | 1,983 | 6,825 | 2,262 | 21,941 | 0.21% | 0 | 0 | 0 |
| Ecological Democratic Party | ÖDP | 2,438 | 3,496 | 2,220 | 4,529 | 2,433 | 15,116 | 0.14% | 0 | 0 | 0 |
| Party of Bible-abiding Christians | PBC | 3,106 | 2,003 | 1,887 | 2,269 | 701 | 9,966 | 0.09% | 0 | 0 | 0 |
| Natural Law Party | | 1,646 | 2,472 | 969 | 2,508 | 1,175 | 8,770 | 0.08% | 0 | 0 | 0 |
| Christian Centre | CM | 1,350 | 1,315 | 1,119 | 1,323 | 909 | 6,016 | 0.06% | 0 | 0 | 0 |
| Centre Party | Z | 530 | 643 | 297 | 1,502 | 785 | 3,757 | 0.04% | 0 | 0 | 0 |
| Marxist–Leninist Party of Germany | MLPD | 505 | 273 | 104 | 861 | 382 | 2,125 | 0.02% | 0 | 0 | 0 |
| Bürgerrechtsbewegung Solidarität | BüSo | 368 | 628 | 183 | 570 | 101 | 1,850 | 0.02% | 0 | 0 | 0 |
| Federation of Socialist Workers | BSA | 227 | 238 | 128 | 281 | 139 | 1,013 | 0.01% | 0 | 0 | 0 |
| Valid votes | | 2,258,088 | 2,450,614 | 1,201,746 | 3,069,945 | 1,533,342 | 10,513,735 | 100.00% | 71 | 77 | 148 |
| Rejected votes | | 45,723 | 45,211 | 25,696 | 54,751 | 31,388 | 202,769 | 1.89% | | | |
| Total polled | | 2,303,811 | 2,495,825 | 1,227,442 | 3,124,696 | 1,564,730 | 10,716,504 | 81.87% | | | |
| Registered electors | | 2,810,526 | 3,013,860 | 1,486,506 | 3,886,841 | 1,891,951 | 13,089,684 | | | | |
| Turnout | | 81.97% | 82.81% | 82.57% | 80.39% | 82.70% | 81.87% | | | | |

The following candidates were elected:

- State seats - Ina Albowitz (FDP); Volker Beck (Grüne); Hans Berger (SPD); Hans Gottfried Bernrath (SPD); Friedhelm Julius Beucher (SPD); Norbert Blüm (CDU); Jochen Borchert (CDU); Anni Brandt-Elsweier (SPD); Annelie Buntenbach (Grüne); Wolf-Michael Catenhusen (SPD); Renate Diemers (CDU); Jörg van Essen (FDP); Ilse Falk (CDU); Leni Fischer (CDU); Paul Friedhoff (FDP); Dagmar Freitag (SPD); Erich G. Fritz (CDU); Anke Fuchs (SPD); Katrin Fuchs (SPD); Hans-Dietrich Genscher (FDP); Reinhard Göhner (CDU); Hermann Gröhe (CDU); Horst Günther (CDU); Dieter Heistermann (SPD); Barbara Hendricks (SPD); Peter Hintze (CDU); Burkhard Hirsch (FDP); Werner Hoyer (FDP); Hubert Hüppe (CDU); Michaele Hustedt (Grüne); Ulla Jelpke (PDS); Steffen Kampeter (CDU); Irmgard Karwatzki (CDU); Hans-Peter Kemper (SPD); Marianne Klappert (SPD); Norbert Königshofen (CDU); Karl-Hans Laermann (FDP); Otto Graf Lambsdorff (FDP); Karl Lamers (CDU); Norbert Lammert (CDU); Heinz Lanfermann (FDP); Karl-Josef Laumann (CDU); Wolfgang Lohmann (CDU); Claire Marienfeld (CDU); Erwin Marschewski (CDU); Ingrid Matthäus-Maier (SPD); Jürgen Möllemann (FDP); Kerstin Müller (Grüne); Michael Müller (SPD); Winfried Nachtwei (Grüne); Christa Nickels (Grüne); Günther Friedrich Nolting (FDP); Beatrix Philipp (CDU); Winfried Pinger (CDU); Simone Probst (Grüne); Rudolf Purps (SPD); Margot von Renesse (SPD); Jürgen Rüttgers (CDU); Bernd Scheelen (SPD); Irmingard Schewe-Gerigk (Grüne); Andreas Schmidt (CDU); Dagmar Schmidt (SPD); Ulla Schmidt (SPD); Regina Schmidt-Zadel (SPD); Wolfgang Schmitt (Grüne); Hans Peter Schmitz (CDU); Walter Schöler (SPD); Reinhard Schultz (SPD); Irmgard Schwaetzer (FDP); Angelica Schwall-Düren (SPD); Manfred Such (Grüne); Wolfgang Vogt (CDU); Ludger Volmer (Grüne); Josef Vosen (SPD); Hildegard Wester (SPD); Bernd Wilz (CDU); and Christoph Zöpel (SPD).

Substitutions:

- Hans Gottfried Bernrath (SPD) resigned on 31 December 1994 and was replaced by Eike Hovermann (SPD) on 13 January 1995.
- Claire Marienfeld (CDU) resigned on 28 April 1995 and was replaced by Wolfgang Meckelburg (CDU) on 2 May 1995.
- Heinz Lanfermann (FDP) resigned on 7 February 1996 and was replaced by Guido Westerwelle (FDP) on 8 February 1996.
- Josef Vosen (SPD) resigned on 3 June 1998 and was replaced by Gerd Bauer (SPD) on 4 June 1998.

Additional state seats following vacation of constituency seats:

- Ulrich Böhme (SPD, Unna I) died on 7 February 1996 and was replaced by Uwe Göllner (SPD) on 12 February 1996.
- Karl H. Fell (CDU, Heinsberg) died on 5 December 1996 and was replaced by Detlef Helling (CDU) on 11 December 1996.
- Dietmar Thieser (SPD, Hagen) resigned on 19 December 1996 and was replaced by Helga Kühn-Mengel (SPD) on 23 December 1996.

===== 1990 =====
Results of the 1990 federal election held on 2 December 1990:

| Party | | Second votes per region | | | | | Total votes | % | Seats | | |
| Party | | Arnsberg | Cologne | Detmold | Düssel- dorf | Münster | Total votes | % | Con. | Stat. | Tot. |
|---|---|---|---|---|---|---|---|---|---|---|---|
| Social Democratic Party of Germany | SPD | 1,000,282 | 889,128 | 429,091 | 1,267,708 | 609,762 | 4,195,971 | 41.11% | 38 | 27 | 65 |
| Christian Democratic Union of Germany | CDU | 837,837 | 991,044 | 510,375 | 1,161,773 | 630,669 | 4,131,698 | 40.48% | 33 | 30 | 63 |
| Free Democratic Party | FDP | 210,222 | 296,613 | 126,007 | 347,943 | 138,182 | 1,118,967 | 10.96% | 0 | 17 | 17 |
| The Greens | Grüne | 85,369 | 114,431 | 51,685 | 127,147 | 61,584 | 440,216 | 4.31% | 0 | 0 | 0 |
| The Republicans | REP | 32,373 | 27,992 | 13,469 | 41,808 | 17,188 | 132,830 | 1.30% | 0 | 0 | 0 |
| The Grays – Gray Panthers | Graue | 15,838 | 20,671 | 7,434 | 27,716 | 9,464 | 81,123 | 0.79% | 0 | 0 | 0 |
| Party of Democratic Socialism | PDS | 5,933 | 7,034 | 2,563 | 9,751 | 3,641 | 28,922 | 0.28% | 0 | 1 | 1 |
| Ecological Democratic Party | ÖDP | 5,238 | 5,565 | 4,076 | 7,543 | 3,582 | 26,004 | 0.25% | 0 | 0 | 0 |
| National Democratic Party of Germany | NPD | 5,838 | 5,856 | 3,353 | 7,028 | 2,562 | 24,637 | 0.24% | 0 | 0 | 0 |
| Women's Party | | 2,898 | 2,695 | 1,378 | 3,530 | 1,576 | 12,077 | 0.12% | 0 | 0 | 0 |
| Christian Centre | CM | 2,781 | 2,578 | 1,911 | 2,657 | 1,340 | 11,267 | 0.11% | 0 | 0 | 0 |
| Union of Working Groups for Employee Politics and Democracy | VAA | 351 | 508 | 182 | 573 | 208 | 1,822 | 0.02% | 0 | 0 | 0 |
| Patriots for Germany | | 250 | 288 | 106 | 351 | 113 | 1,108 | 0.01% | 0 | 0 | 0 |
| Valid votes | | 2,205,210 | 2,364,403 | 1,151,630 | 3,005,528 | 1,479,871 | 10,206,642 | 100.00% | 71 | 75 | 146 |
| Rejected votes | | 22,270 | 24,990 | 13,321 | 28,577 | 14,731 | 103,889 | 1.01% | | | |
| Total polled | | 2,227,480 | 2,389,393 | 1,164,951 | 3,034,105 | 1,494,602 | 10,310,531 | 78.72% | | | |
| Registered electors | | 2,831,071 | 2,996,966 | 1,448,472 | 3,944,769 | 1,876,958 | 13,098,236 | | | | |
| Turnout | | 78.68% | 79.73% | 80.43% | 76.91% | 79.63% | 78.72% | | | | |

The following candidates were elected:

- State seats - Irmgard Adam-Schwaetzer (FDP); Ina Albowitz (FDP); Gerhart Baum (FDP); Helmuth Becker (SPD); Klaus Beckmann (FDP); Hans Berger (SPD); Hans Gottfried Bernrath (SPD); Friedhelm Julius Beucher (SPD); Kurt Biedenkopf (CDU); Norbert Blüm (CDU); Jochen Borchert (CDU); Willy Brandt (SPD); Anni Brandt-Elsweier (SPD); Wolf-Michael Catenhusen (SPD); Dieter-Julius Cronenberg (FDP); Renate Diemers (CDU); Horst Ehmke (SPD); Jörg van Essen (FDP); Helmut Esters (SPD); Ilse Falk (CDU); Leni Fischer (CDU); Paul Friedhoff (FDP); Erich G. Fritz (CDU); Anke Fuchs (SPD); Katrin Fuchs (SPD); Hans H. Gattermann (FDP); Hans-Dietrich Genscher (FDP); Reinhard Göhner (CDU); Horst Günther (CDU); Dieter Heistermann (SPD); Peter Hintze (CDU); Burkhard Hirsch (FDP); Paul Hoffacker (CDU); Uwe Holtz (SPD); Werner Hoyer (FDP); Horst Jaunich (SPD); Ulla Jelpke (PDS); Steffen Kampeter (CDU); Irmgard Karwatzki (CDU); Marianne Klappert (SPD); Volkmar Kretkowski (SPD); Karl-Hans Laermann (FDP); Otto Graf Lambsdorff (FDP); Karl Lamers (CDU); Norbert Lammert (CDU); Wolfgang Lohmann (CDU); Claire Marienfeld (CDU); Erwin Marschewski (CDU); Ingrid Matthäus-Maier (SPD); Wolfgang Meckelburg (CDU); Reinhard Meyer zu Bentrup (CDU); Jürgen Möllemann (FDP); Alfons Müller (CDU); Michael Müller (SPD); Franz Müntefering (SPD); Günther Friedrich Nolting (FDP); Winfried Pinger (CDU); Ronald Pofalla (CDU); Rudolf Purps (SPD); Margot von Renesse (SPD); Jürgen Rüttgers (CDU); Andreas Schmidt (CDU); Ulla Schmidt (SPD); Regina Schmidt-Zadel (SPD); Hans Peter Schmitz (CDU); Gerhard Schüßler (FDP); Heinz-Alfred Steiner (SPD); Friedrich Vogel (CDU); Ruprecht Vondran (CDU); Josef Vosen (SPD); Hildegard Wester (SPD); Dorothee Wilms (CDU); Bernhard Worms (CDU); Christoph Zöpel (SPD); and Burkhard Zurheide (FDP).

Substitutions:

- Bernhard Worms (CDU) resigned on 31 January 1991 and was replaced by Hubert Hüppe (CDU) on 1 February 1991.
- Willy Brandt (SPD) died on 8 October 1992 and was replaced by Heike Niggemeyer (SPD) on 22 October 1992.
- Heike Niggemeyer (SPD) resigned on 29 October 1992 and was replaced by Karl-Heinz Klejdzinski (SPD) on 30 October 1992.
- Franz Müntefering (SPD) resigned on 8 December 1992 and was replaced by Walter Schöler (SPD) on the same day.
- Hans H. Gattermann (FDP) died on 27 January 1994 and was replaced by Detlef Parr (FDP) on 1 February 1994.
- Klaus Beckmann (FDP) died on 27 May 1994 and was replaced by Jens Jordan (FDP) on 8 June 1994.

Additional state seats following vacation of constituency seats:

- Hubert Doppmeier (CDU, Gütersloh) died on 8 March 1992 and was replaced by Klaus-Heiner Lehne (CDU) on 12 March 1992.
- Walter Rempe (SPD, Cologne I) died on 22 April 1993 and was replaced by Hans-Peter Kemper (SPD) on 3 May 1993.

==== 1980s ====
===== 1987 =====
Results of the 1987 federal election held on 25 January 1987:

| Party | | Second votes per region | | | | | Total votes | % | Seats | | |
| Party | | Arnsberg | Cologne | Detmold | Düssel- dorf | Münster | Total votes | % | Con. | Stat. | Tot. |
|---|---|---|---|---|---|---|---|---|---|---|---|
| Social Democratic Party of Germany | SPD | 1,139,363 | 941,444 | 471,567 | 1,463,456 | 677,251 | 4,693,081 | 43.17% | 38 | 24 | 62 |
| Christian Democratic Union of Germany | CDU | 889,812 | 1,050,794 | 514,545 | 1,244,788 | 657,855 | 4,357,794 | 40.09% | 33 | 25 | 58 |
| Free Democratic Party | FDP | 160,550 | 253,852 | 105,921 | 280,339 | 108,479 | 909,141 | 8.36% | 0 | 12 | 12 |
| The Greens | Grüne | 163,232 | 203,626 | 89,566 | 242,540 | 114,107 | 813,071 | 7.48% | 0 | 11 | 11 |
| National Democratic Party of Germany | NPD | 10,864 | 9,079 | 5,064 | 11,811 | 4,712 | 41,530 | 0.38% | 0 | 0 | 0 |
| Ecological Democratic Party | ÖDP | 3,129 | 4,290 | 1,959 | 4,527 | 2,490 | 16,395 | 0.15% | 0 | 0 | 0 |
| Women's Party | | 3,539 | 3,699 | 1,805 | 4,489 | 2,267 | 15,799 | 0.15% | 0 | 0 | 0 |
| Centre Party | Z | 1,846 | 1,789 | 1,000 | 2,533 | 1,913 | 9,081 | 0.08% | 0 | 0 | 0 |
| Responsible Citizens | | 1,398 | 1,634 | 870 | 1,949 | 839 | 6,690 | 0.06% | 0 | 0 | 0 |
| Patriots for Germany | | 831 | 1,056 | 401 | 1,124 | 519 | 3,931 | 0.04% | 0 | 0 | 0 |
| Marxist–Leninist Party of Germany | MLPD | 757 | 637 | 269 | 1,251 | 665 | 3,579 | 0.03% | 0 | 0 | 0 |
| Valid votes | | 2,375,321 | 2,471,900 | 1,192,967 | 3,258,807 | 1,571,097 | 10,870,092 | 100.00% | 71 | 72 | 143 |
| Rejected votes | | 18,197 | 21,167 | 11,593 | 23,631 | 11,916 | 86,504 | 0.79% | | | |
| Total polled | | 2,393,518 | 2,493,067 | 1,204,560 | 3,282,438 | 1,583,013 | 10,956,596 | 85.41% | | | |
| Registered electors | | 2,787,801 | 2,916,889 | 1,393,808 | 3,902,159 | 1,826,989 | 12,827,646 | | | | |
| Turnout | | 85.86% | 85.47% | 86.42% | 84.12% | 86.65% | 85.41% | | | | |

The following candidates were elected:

- State seats - Irmgard Adam-Schwaetzer (FDP); Gerhart Baum (FDP); Helmuth Becker (SPD); Klaus Beckmann (FDP); Hans Gottfried Bernrath (SPD); Kurt Biedenkopf (CDU); Norbert Blüm (CDU); Jochen Borchert (CDU); Helga Brahmst-Rock (Grüne); Willy Brandt (SPD); Ulrich Briefs (Grüne); Hermann Buschfort (SPD); Wolf-Michael Catenhusen (SPD); Dieter-Julius Cronenberg (FDP); Klaus Daweke (CDU); Horst Ehmke (SPD); Helmut Esters (SPD); Leni Fischer (CDU); Anke Fuchs (SPD); Katrin Fuchs (SPD); Hans H. Gattermann (FDP); Hans-Dietrich Genscher (FDP); Ludwig Gerstein (CDU); Reinhard Göhner (CDU); Horst Günther (CDU); Dieter Heistermann (SPD); Imma Hillerich (Grüne); Burkhard Hirsch (FDP); Paul Hoffacker (CDU); Uwe Holtz (SPD); Werner Hoyer (FDP); Agnes Hürland (CDU); Horst Jaunich (SPD); Irmgard Karwatzki (CDU); Wilhelm Knabe (Grüne); Volkmar Kretkowski (SPD); Verena Krieger (Grüne); Friedrich Kronenberg (CDU); Karl-Hans Laermann (FDP); Otto Graf Lambsdorff (FDP); Karl Lamers (CDU); Norbert Lammert (CDU); Editha Limbach (CDU); Erwin Marschewski (CDU); Ingrid Matthäus-Maier (SPD); Reinhard Meyer zu Bentrup (CDU); Jürgen Möllemann (FDP); Alfons Müller (CDU); Michael Müller (SPD); Franz Müntefering (SPD); Christa Nickels (Grüne); Wilhelm Nöbel (SPD); Günther Friedrich Nolting (FDP); Winfried Pinger (CDU); Rudolf Purps (SPD); Johannes Rau (SPD); Gerhard Reddemann (CDU); Annemarie Renger (SPD); Jürgen Rüttgers (CDU); Otto Schily (Grüne); Hans Peter Schmitz (CDU); Erwin Stahl (SPD); Heinz-Alfred Steiner (SPD); Waltraud Steinhauer (SPD); Eckhard Stratmann (Grüne); Trude Unruh (Grüne); Friedrich Vogel (CDU); Antje Vollmer (Grüne); Ludger Volmer (Grüne); Ruprecht Vondran (CDU); Josef Vosen (SPD); and Dorothee Wilms (CDU).

Substitutions:

- Verena Krieger (Grüne) resigned on 4 April 1989 and was replaced by Manfred Such (Grüne) on the same day.
- Otto Schily (Grüne) resigned on 7 November 1989 and was replaced by Almut Kottwitz (Grüne) on 8 November 1989.
- Kurt Biedenkopf (CDU) resigned on 9 November 1990 and was replaced by Wolfgang Lohmann (CDU) on 12 November 1990.

===== 1983 =====
Results of the 1983 federal election held on 6 March 1983:

| Party | | Second votes per region | | | | | Total votes | % | Seats | | |
| Party | | Arnsberg | Cologne | Detmold | Düssel- dorf | Münster | Total votes | % | Con. | Stat. | Tot. |
|---|---|---|---|---|---|---|---|---|---|---|---|
| Christian Democratic Union of Germany | CDU | 1,039,511 | 1,201,129 | 595,303 | 1,454,601 | 756,268 | 5,046,812 | 45.16% | 39 | 26 | 65 |
| Social Democratic Party of Germany | SPD | 1,156,596 | 975,447 | 457,668 | 1,533,835 | 658,674 | 4,782,220 | 42.79% | 32 | 31 | 63 |
| Free Democratic Party | FDP | 131,325 | 186,876 | 90,899 | 221,749 | 85,563 | 716,412 | 6.41% | 0 | 10 | 10 |
| The Greens | Grüne | 123,151 | 136,671 | 67,332 | 171,785 | 82,411 | 581,350 | 5.20% | 0 | 8 | 8 |
| German Communist Party | DKP | 4,717 | 3,476 | 1,446 | 7,802 | 3,624 | 21,065 | 0.19% | 0 | 0 | 0 |
| National Democratic Party of Germany | NPD | 5,708 | 3,634 | 2,211 | 5,678 | 2,203 | 19,434 | 0.17% | 0 | 0 | 0 |
| Independent Social Democrats | USD | 657 | 1,007 | 393 | 925 | 351 | 3,333 | 0.03% | 0 | 0 | 0 |
| European Workers' Party | EAP | 730 | 791 | 288 | 1,132 | 329 | 3,270 | 0.03% | 0 | 0 | 0 |
| Communist Party of Germany/Marxists–Leninists | KPD/ML | 615 | 487 | 230 | 756 | 353 | 2,441 | 0.02% | 0 | 0 | 0 |
| Valid votes | | 2,463,010 | 2,509,518 | 1,215,770 | 3,398,263 | 1,589,776 | 11,176,337 | 100.00% | 71 | 75 | 146 |
| Rejected votes | | 17,065 | 18,321 | 10,515 | 21,753 | 10,383 | 78,037 | 0.69% | | | |
| Total polled | | 2,480,075 | 2,527,839 | 1,226,285 | 3,420,016 | 1,600,159 | 11,254,374 | 89.49% | | | |
| Registered electors | | 2,757,772 | 2,826,450 | 1,354,004 | 3,868,534 | 1,769,844 | 12,576,604 | | | | |
| Turnout | | 89.93% | 89.44% | 90.57% | 88.41% | 90.41% | 89.49% | | | | |

The following candidates were elected:

- State seats - Irmgard Adam-Schwaetzer (FDP); Rainer Barzel (CDU); Gerhart Baum (FDP); Helmuth Becker (SPD); Klaus Beckmann (FDP); Hans Gottfried Bernrath (SPD); Erich Berschkeit (SPD); Norbert Blüm (CDU); Jochen Borchert (CDU); Willy Brandt (SPD); Gerhard Braun (CDU); Hermann Buschfort (SPD); Wolf-Michael Catenhusen (SPD); Dieter-Julius Cronenberg (FDP); Horst Ehmke (SPD); Helmut Esters (SPD); Leni Fischer (CDU); Anke Fuchs (SPD); Katrin Fuchs (SPD); Hans H. Gattermann (FDP); Hans-Dietrich Genscher (FDP); Ludwig Gerstein (CDU); Reinhard Göhner (CDU); Gabriele Gottwald (Grüne); Horst Günther (CDU); Dieter Heistermann (SPD); Burkhard Hirsch (FDP); Uwe Holtz (SPD); Antje Huber (SPD); Herbert Hupka (CDU); Agnes Hürland (CDU); Horst Jaunich (SPD); Irmgard Karwatzki (CDU); Karl-Heinz Klejdzinski (SPD); Herbert W. Köhler (CDU); Volkmar Kretkowski (SPD); Friedrich Kronenberg (CDU); Karl-Hans Laermann (FDP); Manfred Lahnstein (SPD); Otto Graf Lambsdorff (FDP); Karl Lamers (CDU); Norbert Lammert (CDU); Paul Löher (CDU); Erwin Marschewski (CDU); Ingrid Matthäus-Maier (SPD); Paul Mikat (CDU); Jürgen Möllemann (FDP); Adolf Müller (CDU); Alfons Müller (CDU); Michael Müller (SPD); Franz Müntefering (SPD); Christa Nickels (Grüne); Wilhelm Nöbel (SPD); Winfried Pinger (CDU); Gabriele Potthast (Grüne); Rudolf Purps (SPD); Gerhard Reddemann (CDU); Annemarie Renger (SPD); Engelbert Sander (SPD); Otto Schily (Grüne); Günter Schlatter (SPD); Norbert Schlottmann (CDU); Adolf Schmidt (SPD); Erwin Stahl (SPD); Heinz-Alfred Steiner (SPD); Waltraud Steinhauer (SPD); Eckhard Stratmann (Grüne); Hans Verheyen (Grüne); Friedrich Vogel (CDU); Werner Vogel* (Grüne); Kurt Vogelsang (SPD); Antje Vollmer (Grüne); Josef Vosen (SPD); Helga Wex (CDU); and Dorothee Wilms (CDU).

* Werner Vogel (Grüne) did not take-up his mandate and was replaced by Dieter Drabiniok (Grüne).

Substitutions:

- Manfred Lahnstein (SPD) resigned on 31 August 1983 and was replaced by Helga Schmedt (SPD) on 1 September 1983.
- Christa Nickels (Grüne) resigned on 30 March 1985 and was replaced by Annemarie Borgmann (Grüne) on 1 April 1985.
- Hans Verheyen (Grüne) resigned on 30 March 1985 and was replaced by Norbert Mann (Grüne) on 1 April 1985.
- Dieter Drabiniok (Grüne) resigned on 31 March 1985 and was replaced by Marita Wagner (Grüne) on 3 April 1985.
- Gabriele Gottwald (Grüne) resigned on 31 March 1985 and was replaced by Hans-Werner Senfft (Grüne) on 3 April 1985.
- Eckhard Stratmann (Grüne) resigned on 31 March 1985 and was replaced by Karin Zeitler (Grüne) on 3 April 1985.
- Antje Vollmer (Grüne) resigned on 2 April 1985 and was replaced by Ludger Volmer (Grüne) on 10 April 1985.
- Gabriele Potthast (Grüne) resigned on 3 April 1985 and was replaced by Stefan Schulte (Grüne) on 13 April 1985.
- Helga Wex (CDU) died on 9 January 1986 and was replaced by Franz-Josef Berners (CDU) on 17 January 1986.
- Otto Schily (Grüne) resigned on 13 March 1986 and was replaced by Horst Fritsch (Grüne) on 14 March 1986.

Additional state seats following vacation of constituency seats:

- Ulrich Steger (SPD, Recklinghausen II) resigned on 9 July 1984 and was replaced by Lothar Witek (SPD) on 16 July 1984.
- Willi Weiskirch (CDU, Olpe – Siegen-Wittgenstein II) resigned on 20 March 1985 and was replaced by Wilhelm Peter Stommel (CDU) on 21 March 1985.
- Peter Milz (CDU, Euskirchen – Erftkreis II) died on 26 November 1986 and was replaced by Martin Horstmeier (CDU) on 3 December 1986.

===== 1980 =====
Results of the 1980 federal election held on 5 October 1980:

| Party | | Second votes per region | | | | | Total votes | % | Seats | | |
| Party | | Arnsberg | Cologne | Detmold | Düssel- dorf | Münster | Total votes | % | Con. | Stat. | Tot. |
|---|---|---|---|---|---|---|---|---|---|---|---|
| Social Democratic Party of Germany | SPD | 1,241,309 | 1,030,963 | 503,266 | 1,622,100 | 710,509 | 5,108,147 | 46.78% | 44 | 26 | 70 |
| Christian Democratic Union of Germany | CDU | 905,018 | 1,064,765 | 523,774 | 1,270,293 | 668,811 | 4,432,661 | 40.59% | 27 | 33 | 60 |
| Free Democratic Party | FDP | 235,929 | 292,837 | 135,758 | 391,426 | 135,693 | 1,191,643 | 10.91% | 0 | 17 | 17 |
| The Greens | Grüne | 27,115 | 32,664 | 16,383 | 40,595 | 19,521 | 136,278 | 1.25% | 0 | 0 | 0 |
| German Communist Party | DKP | 5,100 | 4,068 | 1,613 | 8,387 | 3,947 | 23,115 | 0.21% | 0 | 0 | 0 |
| National Democratic Party of Germany | NPD | 4,195 | 2,741 | 1,393 | 4,406 | 1,672 | 14,407 | 0.13% | 0 | 0 | 0 |
| Citizens' Party | BP | 1,642 | 1,423 | 744 | 2,549 | 942 | 7,300 | 0.07% | 0 | 0 | 0 |
| People's Front Against Reaction, Fascism and War | VF | 756 | 372 | 272 | 640 | 367 | 2,407 | 0.02% | 0 | 0 | 0 |
| European Workers' Party | EAP | 396 | 432 | 180 | 628 | 191 | 1,827 | 0.02% | 0 | 0 | 0 |
| Communist League of West Germany | KBW | 399 | 415 | 177 | 431 | 242 | 1,664 | 0.02% | 0 | 0 | 0 |
| Valid votes | | 2,421,859 | 2,430,680 | 1,183,560 | 3,341,455 | 1,541,895 | 10,919,449 | 100.00% | 71 | 76 | 147 |
| Rejected votes | | 19,068 | 21,644 | 10,758 | 25,833 | 11,930 | 89,233 | 0.81% | | | |
| Total polled | | 2,440,927 | 2,452,324 | 1,194,318 | 3,367,288 | 1,553,825 | 11,008,682 | 88.96% | | | |
| Registered electors | | 2,725,900 | 2,766,363 | 1,326,016 | 3,830,475 | 1,725,560 | 12,374,314 | | | | |
| Turnout | | 89.55% | 88.65% | 90.07% | 87.91% | 90.05% | 88.96% | | | | |

The following candidates were elected:

- State seats - Irmgard Adam-Schwaetzer (FDP); Rainer Barzel (CDU); Gerhart Baum (FDP); Helmuth Becker (SPD); Klaus Beckmann (FDP); Hans Gottfried Bernrath (SPD); Jochen Borchert (CDU); Willy Brandt (SPD); Gerhard Braun (CDU); Carola von Braun-Stützer (FDP); Hermann Buschfort (SPD); Wolf-Michael Catenhusen (SPD); Dieter-Julius Cronenberg (FDP); Klaus Daweke (CDU); Horst Ehmke (SPD); Helmut Esters (SPD); Leni Fischer (CDU); Klaus Gärtner (FDP); Hans H. Gattermann (FDP); Hans-Dietrich Genscher (FDP); Ludwig Gerstein (CDU); Horst Ginnuttis (SPD); Horst Günther (CDU); Karl-Heinz Hansen (SPD); Hansheinz Hauser (CDU); Dieter Heistermann (SPD); Peter von der Heydt Freiherr von Massenbach (CDU); Burkhard Hirsch (FDP); Erwin Holsteg (FDP); Martin Horstmeier (CDU); Herbert Hupka (CDU); Agnes Hürland (CDU); Horst Jaunich (SPD); Irmgard Karwatzki (CDU); Karl-Heinz Klejdzinski (SPD); Herbert W. Köhler (CDU); Karl-Hans Laermann (FDP); Otto Graf Lambsdorff (FDP); Karl Lamers (CDU); Norbert Lammert (CDU); Egon Lampersbach (CDU); Heinz Landré (CDU); Paul Löher (CDU); Ingrid Matthäus-Maier (FDP); Rolf Merker (FDP); Reinhard Meyer zu Bentrup (CDU); Paul Mikat (CDU); Jürgen Möllemann (FDP); Adolf Müller (CDU); Alfons Müller (CDU); Franz Müntefering (SPD); Wilhelm Nöbel (SPD); Winfried Pinger (CDU); Heinz-Jürgen Prangenberg (CDU); Rudolf Purps (SPD); Gerhard Reddemann (CDU); Annemarie Renger (SPD); Friedhelm Rentrop (FDP); Horst-Ludwig Riemer (FDP); Engelbert Sander (SPD); Günter Schlatter (SPD); Helga Schmedt (SPD); Adolf Schmidt (SPD); Hans Peter Schmitz (CDU); Hans Werner Schmöle (CDU); Erwin Stahl (SPD); Heinz-Alfred Steiner (SPD); Waltraud Steinhauer (SPD); Klaus Thüsing (SPD); Friedrich Vogel (CDU); Günter Volmer (CDU); Josef Vosen (SPD); Helga Wex (CDU); Dorothee Wilms (CDU); and Lothar Witek (SPD).

Substitutions:

- Ingrid Matthäus-Maier (Ind) resigned on 2 December 1982 and was replaced by Matthias Ginsberg (FDP) on 9 December 1982.
- Egon Lampersbach (CDU) died on 16 December 1982 and was replaced by Paul Hoffacker (CDU) on 21 December 1982.

Additional state seats following vacation of constituency seats:

- Hermann Schmidt (SPD, Siegen-Wittgenstein I) died on 10 February 1983 and was replaced by Heinz Assmann (SPD) on 24 February 1983.

==== 1970s ====
===== 1976 =====
Results of the 1976 federal election held on 3 October 1976:

| Party | | Second votes per region | | | | | Total votes | % | Seats | | |
| Party | | Arnsberg | Cologne | Detmold | Düssel- dorf | Münster | Total votes | % | Con. | Stat. | Tot. |
|---|---|---|---|---|---|---|---|---|---|---|---|
| Social Democratic Party of Germany | SPD | 1,266,835 | 1,023,156 | 499,997 | 1,658,715 | 705,256 | 5,153,959 | 46.90% | 45 | 25 | 70 |
| Christian Democratic Union of Germany | CDU | 1,003,838 | 1,166,038 | 569,031 | 1,432,810 | 720,561 | 4,892,278 | 44.52% | 28 | 38 | 66 |
| Free Democratic Party | FDP | 171,562 | 210,905 | 102,366 | 286,309 | 89,189 | 860,331 | 7.83% | 0 | 12 | 12 |
| German Communist Party | DKP | 8,298 | 7,041 | 2,626 | 13,913 | 6,298 | 38,176 | 0.35% | 0 | 0 | 0 |
| National Democratic Party of Germany | NPD | 6,476 | 5,147 | 2,346 | 6,895 | 2,494 | 23,358 | 0.21% | 0 | 0 | 0 |
| Communist Party of Germany (Organisational Structure) | KPD (AO) | 1,543 | 1,533 | 531 | 1,801 | 771 | 6,179 | 0.06% | 0 | 0 | 0 |
| Action Group of Independent Germans | AUD | 879 | 1,206 | 493 | 1,735 | 615 | 4,928 | 0.04% | 0 | 0 | 0 |
| Communist League of West Germany | KBW | 891 | 1,089 | 359 | 1,002 | 562 | 3,903 | 0.04% | 0 | 0 | 0 |
| Action Community Fourth Party | AVP | 459 | 367 | 240 | 494 | 226 | 1,786 | 0.02% | 0 | 0 | 0 |
| International Marxist Group | GIM | 309 | 475 | 244 | 479 | 263 | 1,770 | 0.02% | 0 | 0 | 0 |
| European Workers' Party | EAP | 390 | 319 | 107 | 496 | 116 | 1,428 | 0.01% | 0 | 0 | 0 |
| Independent Workers' Party (German Socialists) | UAP | 248 | 131 | 77 | 203 | 106 | 765 | 0.01% | 0 | 0 | 0 |
| United Left | VL | 148 | 184 | 80 | 194 | 95 | 701 | 0.01% | 0 | 0 | 0 |
| Valid votes | | 2,461,876 | 2,417,591 | 1,178,497 | 3,405,046 | 1,526,552 | 10,989,562 | 100.00% | 73 | 75 | 148 |
| Rejected votes | | 12,121 | 16,899 | 7,749 | 25,253 | 14,962 | 76,984 | 0.70% | | | |
| Total polled | | 2,473,997 | 2,434,490 | 1,186,246 | 3,430,299 | 1,541,514 | 11,066,546 | 91.32% | | | |
| Registered electors | | 2,693,052 | 2,684,573 | 1,283,155 | 3,792,587 | 1,665,166 | 12,118,533 | | | | |
| Turnout | | 91.87% | 90.68% | 92.45% | 90.45% | 92.57% | 91.32% | | | | |

The following candidates were elected:

- State seats - Gerhart Baum (FDP); Helmuth Becker (SPD); Ulrich Berger (CDU); Kurt Biedenkopf (CDU); Bertram Blank (SPD); Willy Brandt (SPD); Ferdinand Breidbach (CDU); Hermann Buschfort (SPD); Bernhard Bußmann (SPD); Dieter-Julius Cronenberg (FDP); Klaus Daweke (CDU); Helmut Esters (SPD); Udo Fiebig (SPD); Leni Fischer (CDU); Liselotte Funcke (FDP); Klaus Gärtner (FDP); Hans H. Gattermann (FDP); Hans-Dietrich Genscher (FDP); Ludwig Gerstein (CDU); Kurt Gscheidle (SPD); Karl-Heinz Hansen (SPD); Albrecht Hasinger (CDU); Peter von der Heydt Freiherr von Massenbach (CDU); Paul Hoffacker (CDU); Martin Horstmeier (CDU); Herbert Hupka (CDU); Agnes Hürland (CDU); Horst Jaunich (SPD); Heinrich Junker (SPD); Irmgard Karwatzki (CDU); Hans Katzer (CDU); Herbert W. Köhler (CDU); Wilhelm Krampe (CDU); Konrad Kraske (CDU); Paul Kratz (SPD); Volkmar Kretkowski (SPD); Karl-Hans Laermann (FDP); Otto Graf Lambsdorff (FDP); Egon Lampersbach (CDU); Heinz Landré (CDU); Paul Löher (CDU); Manfred Luda (CDU); Werner Maihofer (FDP); Ingrid Matthäus-Maier (FDP); Reinhard Meyer zu Bentrup (CDU); Paul Mikat (CDU); Jürgen Möllemann (FDP); Adolf Müller (CDU); Franz Müntefering (SPD); Wilhelm Nöbel (SPD); Alfred Ollesch (FDP); Winfried Pinger (CDU); Heinz-Jürgen Prangenberg (CDU); Gerhard Reddemann (CDU); Annemarie Renger (SPD); Hermann Josef Russe (CDU); Karl-Heinz Saxowski (SPD); Botho Prinz zu Sayn-Wittgenstein-Hohenstein (CDU); Adolf Schmidt (SPD); Manfred Schmidt (CDU); Hans Peter Schmitz (CDU); Hans Werner Schmöle (CDU); Gerhard Schröder (CDU); Erwin Stahl (SPD); Waltraud Steinhauer (SPD); Manfred Sybertz (SPD); Albert Tönjes (SPD); Friedrich Vogel (CDU); Kurt Vogelsang (SPD); Günter Volmer (CDU); Martin Wendt (SPD); Helga Wex (CDU); Dorothee Wilms (CDU); Otto Wulff (CDU); and Kurt Wüster (SPD).

Substitutions:

- Alfred Ollesch (FDP) died on 16 April 1978 and was replaced by Rolf Merker (FDP) on 20 April 1978.
- Bertram Blank (SPD) died on 23 May 1978 and was replaced by Engelbert Sander (SPD) on 26 May 1978.
- Liselotte Funcke (FDP) resigned on 23 November 1979 and was replaced by Eckhard Schleifenbaum (FDP) on 26 November 1979.
- Albert Tönjes (SPD) resigned on 25 April 1980 and was replaced by Dieter Schinzel (SPD) on 5 May 1980.

Additional state seats following vacation of constituency seats:

- Hermann Spillecke (SPD, Duisburg II) died on 5 May 1977 and was replaced by Klaus Thüsing (SPD) on 9 May 1977.
- Adolf Scheu (SPD, Wuppertal I) died on 20 December 1978 and was replaced by Karl-Heinz Walkhoff (SPD) on 31 December 1978.
- Kurt Koblitz (SPD, Aachen-Land) died on 13 October 1979 and was replaced by Josef Vosen (SPD) on 18 October 1979.

===== 1972 =====
Results of the 1972 federal election held on 19 November 1972:

| Party | | Second votes per region | | | | | Total votes | % | Seats | | |
| Party | | Arnsberg | Cologne | Detmold | Düssel- dorf | Münster | Total votes | % | Con. | Stat. | Tot. |
|---|---|---|---|---|---|---|---|---|---|---|---|
| Social Democratic Party of Germany | SPD | 1,343,532 | 1,003,689 | 532,170 | 1,889,480 | 741,015 | 5,509,886 | 50.39% | 52 | 23 | 75 |
| Christian Democratic Union of Germany | CDU | 903,281 | 988,751 | 517,205 | 1,387,840 | 687,580 | 4,484,657 | 41.01% | 21 | 40 | 61 |
| Free Democratic Party | FDP | 173,073 | 197,575 | 94,209 | 305,208 | 86,898 | 856,963 | 7.84% | 0 | 12 | 12 |
| National Democratic Party of Germany | NPD | 9,321 | 7,319 | 4,771 | 12,054 | 4,163 | 37,628 | 0.34% | 0 | 0 | 0 |
| German Communist Party | DKP | 9,161 | 6,058 | 2,654 | 14,308 | 5,419 | 37,600 | 0.34% | 0 | 0 | 0 |
| European Federalist Party | EFP | 1,116 | 1,427 | 541 | 1,575 | 559 | 5,218 | 0.05% | 0 | 0 | 0 |
| Free Social Union | FSU | 600 | 375 | 388 | 1,004 | 319 | 2,686 | 0.02% | 0 | 0 | 0 |
| Valid votes | | 2,440,084 | 2,205,194 | 1,151,938 | 3,611,469 | 1,525,953 | 10,934,638 | 100.00% | 73 | 75 | 148 |
| Rejected votes | | 15,228 | 15,332 | 8,541 | 22,387 | 9,681 | 71,169 | 0.65% | | | |
| Total polled | | 2,455,312 | 2,220,526 | 1,160,479 | 3,633,856 | 1,535,634 | 11,005,807 | 91.77% | | | |
| Registered electors | | 2,669,991 | 2,430,141 | 1,255,072 | 3,983,422 | 1,654,180 | 11,992,806 | | | | |
| Turnout | | 91.96% | 91.37% | 92.46% | 91.22% | 92.83% | 91.77% | | | | |

The following candidates were elected:

- State seats - Ernst Achenbach (FDP); Rudolf Augstein (FDP); Gerhart Baum (FDP); Helmuth Becker (SPD); Ulrich Berger (CDU); Karl Bewerunge (CDU); Kurt Birrenbach (CDU); Helmut von Bockelberg (CDU); Willy Brandt (SPD); Gerhard Braun (CDU); Ferdinand Breidbach (CDU); Fritz Burgbacher (CDU); Hermann Buschfort (SPD); Bernhard Bußmann (SPD); Rembert van Delden (CDU); Helmut Esters (SPD); Göke Frerichs (CDU); Liselotte Funcke (FDP); Hans-Dietrich Genscher (FDP); Karl-Heinz Hansen (SPD); Hansheinz Hauser (CDU); Burkhard Hirsch (FDP); Martin Horstmeier (CDU); Herbert Hupka (CDU); Agnes Hürland (CDU); Günter Jaschke (SPD); Horst Jaunich (SPD); Hans Katzer (CDU); Herbert W. Köhler (CDU); Wilhelm Krampe (CDU); Konrad Kraske (CDU); Paul Kratz (SPD); Otto Graf Lambsdorff (FDP); Egon Lampersbach (CDU); Paul Löher (CDU); Ulrich Lohmar (SPD); Manfred Luda (CDU); Werner Maihofer (FDP); Josef Mick (CDU); Paul Mikat (CDU); Jürgen Möllemann (FDP); Adolf Müller (CDU); Alfred Ollesch (FDP); Rudolf Opitz (FDP); Wilderich Freiherr Ostman von der Leye (SPD); Gerhard Reddemann (CDU); Annemarie Renger-Loncarevic (SPD); Gerd Ritgen (CDU); Hermann Josef Russe (CDU); Engelbert Sander (SPD); Karl-Heinz Saxowski (SPD); Botho Prinz zu Sayn-Wittgenstein-Hohenstein (CDU); Walter Scheel (FDP); Hildegard Schimschok (SPD); Adolf Schmidt (SPD); Hans Peter Schmitz (CDU); Hans Werner Schmöle (CDU); Gerhard Schröder (CDU); Christa Schroeder (CDU); Gerd Springorum (CDU); Erwin Stahl (SPD); Maria Stommel (CDU); Albert Tönjes (SPD); Max Vehar (CDU); Franz Vit (SPD); Friedrich Vogel (CDU); Kurt Vogelsang (SPD); Günter Volmer (CDU); Karl-Heinz Walkhoff (SPD); Martin Wendt (SPD); Helga Wex (CDU); Karl Wienand (SPD); Erika Wolf (CDU); and Otto Wulff (CDU).

Substitutions:

- Rudolf Augstein (FDP) resigned on 24 January 1973 and was replaced by Rolf Böger (FDP) on 25 January 1973.
- Walter Scheel (FDP) resigned on 27 June 1974 and was replaced by Karl-Hans Laermann (FDP) on 28 June 1974.
- Karl Wienand (SPD) resigned on 3 December 1974 and was replaced by Waltraud Steinhauer (SPD) on 9 December 1974.
- Göke Frerichs (CDU) resigned on 15 January 1975 and was replaced by Manfred Schmidt (CDU) on 17 January 1975.
- Burkhard Hirsch (FDP) resigned on 5 June 1975 and was replaced by Eckhard Schleifenbaum (FDP) on the same day.

Additional state seats following vacation of constituency seats:

- Friedhelm Farthmann (SPD, Rheydt – Grevenbroich II) resigned on 5 June 1975 and was replaced by Franz Müntefering (SPD) on 10 June 1975.

==== 1960s ====
===== 1969 =====
Results of the 1969 federal election held on 28 September 1969:

| Party | | Second votes per region | | | | | | Total votes | % | Seats | | |
| Party | | Aachen | Arnsberg | Cologne | Detmold | Düssel- dorf | Münster | Total votes | % | Con. | Stat. | Tot. |
|---|---|---|---|---|---|---|---|---|---|---|---|---|
| Social Democratic Party of Germany | SPD | 213,327 | 1,127,729 | 615,155 | 444,403 | 1,551,654 | 582,203 | 4,534,471 | 46.81% | 47 | 26 | 73 |
| Christian Democratic Union of Germany | CDU | 313,858 | 860,534 | 595,143 | 461,518 | 1,330,953 | 660,908 | 4,222,914 | 43.59% | 26 | 43 | 69 |
| Free Democratic Party | FDP | 25,070 | 109,305 | 88,424 | 64,480 | 188,054 | 51,528 | 526,861 | 5.44% | 0 | 9 | 9 |
| National Democratic Party of Germany | NPD | 15,232 | 70,629 | 39,758 | 44,155 | 93,261 | 32,937 | 295,972 | 3.06% | 0 | 0 | 0 |
| Campaign for Democratic Progress | ADF | 2,930 | 15,299 | 6,999 | 3,754 | 27,167 | 8,675 | 64,824 | 0.67% | 0 | 0 | 0 |
| Centre Party | Z | 674 | 2,555 | 1,235 | 1,207 | 4,113 | 5,330 | 15,114 | 0.16% | 0 | 0 | 0 |
| European Party | EP | 595 | 1,843 | 2,100 | 808 | 4,181 | 1,061 | 10,588 | 0.11% | 0 | 0 | 0 |
| Free Social Union | FSU | 161 | 1,343 | 599 | 1,075 | 2,821 | 736 | 6,735 | 0.07% | 0 | 0 | 0 |
| Independent Workers' Party (German Socialists) | UAP | 406 | 1,256 | 639 | 446 | 1,899 | 663 | 5,309 | 0.05% | 0 | 0 | 0 |
| All-German Party | GDP | 181 | 939 | 681 | 369 | 1,636 | 519 | 4,325 | 0.04% | 0 | 0 | 0 |
| Valid votes | | 572,434 | 2,191,432 | 1,350,733 | 1,022,215 | 3,205,739 | 1,344,560 | 9,687,113 | 100.00% | 73 | 78 | 151 |
| Rejected votes | | 10,465 | 31,285 | 19,123 | 16,780 | 43,828 | 19,317 | 140,798 | 1.43% | | | |
| Total polled | | 582,899 | 2,222,717 | 1,369,856 | 1,038,995 | 3,249,567 | 1,363,877 | 9,827,911 | 87.28% | | | |
| Registered electors | | 653,487 | 2,525,712 | 1,600,538 | 1,169,110 | 3,782,977 | 1,527,824 | 11,259,648 | | | | |
| Turnout | | 89.20% | 88.00% | 85.59% | 88.87% | 85.90% | 89.27% | 87.28% | | | | |

The following candidates were elected:

- State seats - Ernst Achenbach (FDP); Walter Arendt (SPD); Helmuth Becker (SPD); Ulrich Berger (CDU); Karl Bewerunge (CDU); Kurt Birrenbach (CDU); Theodor Blank (CDU); Helmut von Bockelberg (CDU); Günter Böhme (CDU); Willy Brandt (SPD); Aenne Brauksiepe (CDU); Ferdinand Breidbach (CDU); Hermann Buschfort (SPD); Bernhard Bußmann (SPD); Rembert van Delden (CDU); Hans Dichgans (CDU); Wolfram Dorn (FDP); Elfriede Eilers (SPD); Leo Ernesti (CDU); Helmut Esters (SPD); Udo Fiebig (SPD); Göke Frerichs (CDU); Liselotte Funcke (FDP); Hans-Dietrich Genscher (FDP); Karl-Heinz Hansen (SPD); Martin Horstmeier (CDU); Herbert Hupka (SPD); Maria Jacobi (CDU); Günter Jaschke (SPD); Hans Katzer (CDU); Gerhard Kienbaum (FDP); Peter-Michael Koenig (SPD); Heinrich Köppler (CDU); Wilhelm Krampe (CDU); Konrad Kraske (CDU); Egon Lampersbach (CDU); Hubert Lemper (SPD); Eduard Lensing (CDU); Ulrich Lohmar (SPD); Manfred Luda (CDU); Willi Maibaum (SPD); Erich Mende (FDP); Josef Mick (CDU); Paul Mikat (CDU); Adolf Müller (CDU); Alfred Ollesch (FDP); Wilderich Freiherr Ostman von der Leye (SPD); Winfried Pinger (CDU); Heinz Pöhler (SPD); Gerhard Reddemann (CDU); Annemarie Renger-Loncarevic (SPD); Josef Rösing (CDU); Hermann Josef Russe (CDU); Engelbert Sander (SPD); Karl-Heinz Saxowski (SPD); Botho Prinz zu Sayn-Wittgenstein-Hohenstein (CDU); Walter Scheel (FDP); Hildegard Schimschok (SPD); Otto Schmidt (CDU); Kurt Schober (CDU); Gerhard Schröder (CDU); Christa Schroeder (CDU); Georg Schulhoff (CDU); Gerd Springorum (CDU); Maria Stommel (CDU); Albert Tönjes (SPD); Max Vehar (CDU); Franz Vit (SPD); Friedrich Vogel (CDU); Wolfgang Vogt (CDU); Günter Volmer (CDU); Karl-Heinz Walkhoff (SPD); Martin Wendt (SPD); Karl Wienand (SPD); Bernhard Winkelheide (CDU); Erika Wolf (CDU); Otto Wulff (CDU); and Siegfried Zoglmann (FDP).

Substitutions:

- Heinrich Köppler (CDU) resigned on 8 August 1970 and was replaced by Valentin Brück (CDU) on 14 August 1970.
- Theodor Blank (CDU) resigned on 21 April 1972 and was replaced by Paul Löher (CDU) on 23 April 1972.
- Gerhard Kienbaum (FDP) resigned on 2 May 1972 and was replaced by Rudolf Opitz (FDP) on the same day.

Additional state seats following vacation of constituency seats:

- Friedhelm Dohmann (SPD, Dortmund II) died on 20 February 1970 and was replaced by Heinrich Welslau (SPD) on 26 February 1970.
- Werner Jacobi (SPD, Iserlohn) died on 5 March 1970 and was replaced by Hans-Eberhard Urbaniak (SPD) on 9 March 1970.
- Udo Hein (SPD, Dinslaken) died on 19 January 1971 and was replaced by Friedhelm Farthmann (SPD) on 26 January 1971.

===== 1965 =====
Results of the 1965 federal election held on 19 September 1965:

| Party | | Second votes per region | | | | | | | Total votes | % | Seats | | |
| Party | | Aachen | Arnsberg | Cologne | Detmold | Düssel- dorf | Münster | Postal votes | Total votes | % | Con. | Stat. | Tot. |
|---|---|---|---|---|---|---|---|---|---|---|---|---|---|
| Christian Democratic Union of Germany | CDU | 303,523 | 844,195 | 598,872 | 426,713 | 1,305,524 | 656,415 | 458,039 | 4,593,281 | 47.10% | 38 | 36 | 74 |
| Social Democratic Party of Germany | SPD | 179,110 | 1,012,986 | 447,930 | 395,158 | 1,348,758 | 498,763 | 267,205 | 4,149,910 | 42.56% | 35 | 31 | 66 |
| Free Democratic Party | FDP | 33,733 | 138,477 | 99,825 | 92,877 | 233,188 | 65,362 | 76,492 | 739,954 | 7.59% | 0 | 13 | 13 |
| German Peace Union | DFU | 9,331 | 55,844 | 31,829 | 30,438 | 87,895 | 28,960 | 23,790 | 125,202 | 1.28% | 0 | 0 | 0 |
| National Democratic Party of Germany | NPD | 9,331 | 55,844 | 31,829 | 30,438 | 87,895 | 28,960 | 23,790 | 110,299 | 1.13% | 0 | 0 | 0 |
| Action Group of Independent Germans | AUD | 9,331 | 55,844 | 31,829 | 30,438 | 87,895 | 28,960 | 23,790 | 11,428 | 0.12% | 0 | 0 | 0 |
| Christian People's Party | CVP | 9,331 | 55,844 | 31,829 | 30,438 | 87,895 | 28,960 | 23,790 | 10,830 | 0.11% | 0 | 0 | 0 |
| Free Social Union | FSU | 9,331 | 55,844 | 31,829 | 30,438 | 87,895 | 28,960 | 23,790 | 6,369 | 0.07% | 0 | 0 | 0 |
| Independent Workers' Party (German Socialists) | UAP | 9,331 | 55,844 | 31,829 | 30,438 | 87,895 | 28,960 | 23,790 | 3,959 | 0.04% | 0 | 0 | 0 |
| Valid votes | | 525,697 | 2,051,502 | 1,178,456 | 945,186 | 2,975,365 | 1,249,500 | 825,526 | 9,751,232 | 100.00% | 73 | 80 | 153 |
| Rejected votes | | 12,335 | 36,018 | 22,466 | 20,436 | 50,642 | 22,177 | 4,762 | 168,836 | 1.70% | | | |
| Total polled | | 538,032 | 2,087,520 | 1,200,922 | 965,622 | 3,026,007 | 1,271,677 | 830,288 | 9,920,068 | 87.61% | | | |
| Registered electors | | 650,824 | 2,561,274 | 1,568,490 | 1,165,393 | 3,839,902 | 1,536,744 | | 11,322,627 | | | | |
| Turnout | | 82.67% | 81.50% | 76.57% | 82.86% | 78.80% | 82.75% | | 87.61% | | | | |

The following candidates were elected:

- State seats - Ernst Achenbach (FDP); Walter Arendt (SPD); Adolf Arndt (SPD); Ulrich Berger (CDU); Karl Bewerunge (CDU); Kurt Birrenbach (CDU); Willy Brandt* (SPD); Valentin Brück (CDU); Heinz Budde (CDU); Hermann Busse (FDP); Rembert van Delden (CDU); Hans Dichgans (CDU); Wolfram Dorn (FDP); Josef Effertz (FDP); Elfriede Eilers (SPD); Hans Georg Emde (FDP); Fritz Eschmann (SPD); Karl-Heinz Exner (CDU); Werner Figgen (SPD); Göke Frerichs (CDU); Martin Frey (CDU); Liselotte Funcke (FDP); Hans-Dietrich Genscher (FDP); Karl Hahn (CDU); Alo Hauser (CDU); Udo Hein (SPD); Josef Hellenbrock (SPD); Martin Horstmeier (CDU); Josef Hufnagel (SPD); Hans Iven (SPD); Maria Jacobi (CDU); Werner Jacobi (SPD); Wenzel Jaksch (SPD); Günter Jaschke (SPD); Hans Katzer (CDU); Jakob Koenen (SPD); Willy Könen (SPD); Heinrich Köppler (CDU); Egon Lampersbach (CDU); Hubert Lemper (SPD); Ulrich Lohmar (SPD); Manfred Luda (CDU); Willi Maibaum (SPD); Hans Meis (CDU); Erich Mende (FDP); Josef Mick (CDU); Adolf Müller (CDU); Georg Neemann (SPD); Peter Nellen (SPD); Alfred Ollesch (FDP); Rudolf Opitz (FDP); Gerhard Philipp (CDU); Heinz Pöhler (SPD); Josef Porten (CDU); Josef Porten (CDU); Egon Ramms (FDP); Gerd Ritgen (CDU); Josef Rösing (CDU); Margarete Rudoll (SPD); Hermann Josef Russe (CDU); Karl-Heinz Saxowski (SPD); Walter Scheel (FDP); Hildegard Schimschok (SPD); Hermann Schmidt (SPD); Otto Schmidt (CDU); Kurt Schober (CDU); Christa Schroeder (CDU); Gerd Springorum (CDU); Maria Stommel (CDU); Theodor Teriete (CDU); Albert Tönjes (SPD); Franz Vit (SPD); Friedrich Vogel (CDU); Heinrich Welslau (SPD); Martin Wendt (SPD); Helene Wessel** (SPD); Karl Wienand (SPD); Bernhard Winkelheide (CDU); Erika Wolf (CDU); Heinrich Wullenhaupt (CDU); and Siegfried Zoglmann (FDP).

* Willy Brandt (SPD) did not take-up his mandate and was replaced by Hermann Buschfort (SPD). ** Helene Wessel (SPD) died on 13 October 1969 but was not replaced as the term of the 5th Bundestag ended on 19 October 1969.

Substitutions:

- Gerhard Philipp (CDU) died on 20 April 1966 and was replaced by Elisabeth Enseling (CDU) on 28 April 1966.
- Friedrich Vogel (CDU) resigned on 6 October 1966 and was replaced by Wilhelm Krampe (CDU) on 11 October 1966.
- Wenzel Jaksch (SPD) died on 27 November 1966 and was replaced by Klaus Hübner (SPD) on 6 December 1966.
- Werner Figgen (SPD) resigned on 6 December 1966 and was replaced by Rudi Adams (SPD) on 8 December 1966.
- Udo Hein (SPD) resigned on 22 December 1966 and was replaced by Adolf Feuring (SPD) on 2 January 1967.
- Josef Effertz (FDP) resigned on 4 March 1968 and was replaced by Hedda Heuser (FDP) on 11 March 1968.
- Klaus Hübner (SPD) resigned on 14 January 1969 and was replaced by Helmut Esters (SPD) on 15 January 1969.

Additional state seats following vacation of constituency seats:

- Hans Verbeek (CDU, Bergheim) died on 13 December 1966 and was replaced by Erich Weiland (CDU) on 14 December 1966.
- Heinrich Wilper (CDU, Höxter) died on 3 March 1967 and was replaced by Leo Ernesti (CDU) on 9 March 1967.
- Konrad Adenauer (CDU, Bonn) died on 19 April 1967 and was replaced by Helga Wex (CDU) on 28 April 1967.
- Theodor Mengelkamp (CDU, Iserlohn) died on 21 July 1967 and was replaced by Franz Falke (CDU) on 27 July 1967.
- Gustav Heinemann (SPD, Bochum – Witten) resigned on 24 June 1969 and was replaced by Hermann Dortans (SPD) on 30 June 1969.

===== 1961 =====
Results of the 1961 federal election held on 17 September 1961:

| Party | | Second votes per region | | | | | | | Total votes | % | Seats | | |
| Party | | Aachen | Arnsberg | Cologne | Detmold | Düssel- dorf | Münster | Postal votes | Total votes | % | Con. | Stat. | Tot. |
|---|---|---|---|---|---|---|---|---|---|---|---|---|---|
| Christian Democratic Union of Germany | CDU | 312,008 | 843,122 | 606,672 | 400,951 | 1,348,431 | 674,600 | 344,769 | 4,530,553 | 47.60% | 41 | 35 | 76 |
| Social Democratic Party of Germany | SPD | 146,572 | 911,295 | 363,881 | 372,336 | 1,167,125 | 429,950 | 158,200 | 3,549,359 | 37.29% | 25 | 35 | 60 |
| Free Democratic Party | FDP | 47,176 | 222,662 | 151,874 | 136,569 | 363,238 | 104,937 | 92,004 | 1,118,460 | 11.75% | 0 | 19 | 19 |
| German Peace Union | DFU | 7,194 | 42,848 | 18,976 | 12,004 | 75,001 | 24,324 | 8,095 | 188,442 | 1.98% | 0 | 0 | 0 |
| All-German Party | GDP | 2,483 | 17,142 | 11,438 | 12,665 | 22,374 | 11,704 | 5,325 | 83,131 | 0.87% | 0 | 0 | 0 |
| Deutsche Reichspartei | DRP | 2,130 | 10,885 | 5,220 | 5,648 | 13,152 | 4,711 | 2,186 | 43,932 | 0.46% | 0 | 0 | 0 |
| German Community | DG | 176 | 1,028 | 293 | 557 | 1,357 | 771 | 187 | 4,369 | 0.05% | 0 | 0 | 0 |
| Valid votes | | 517,739 | 2,048,982 | 1,158,354 | 940,730 | 2,990,678 | 1,250,997 | 610,766 | 9,518,246 | 100.00% | 66 | 89 | 155 |
| Rejected votes | | 18,022 | 65,899 | 34,050 | 26,346 | 95,188 | 35,165 | 6,513 | 281,183 | 2.87% | | | |
| Total polled | | 535,761 | 2,114,881 | 1,192,404 | 967,076 | 3,085,866 | 1,286,162 | 617,279 | 9,799,429 | 88.40% | | | |
| Registered electors | | 629,357 | 2,529,980 | 1,505,961 | 1,130,656 | 3,784,532 | 1,505,289 | | 11,085,775 | | | | |
| Turnout | | 85.13% | 83.59% | 79.18% | 85.53% | 81.54% | 85.44% | | 88.40% | | | | |

The following candidates were elected:

- State seats - Ernst Achenbach (FDP); Luise Albertz (SPD); Artur Anders (SPD); Albrecht Aschoff (FDP); Karl Bewerunge (CDU); Günter Biermann (SPD); Kurt Birrenbach (CDU); Ernst von Bodelschwingh (CDU); Julius Brecht (SPD); Valentin Brück (CDU); Richard Burckardt (FDP); Hermann Busse (FDP); Rembert van Delden (CDU); Hans Dichgans (CDU); Wilhelm Dopatka (SPD); Wolfgang Döring (FDP); Wolfram Dorn (FDP); Josef Effertz (FDP); Ernst Theodor Eichelbaum (CDU); Elfriede Eilers (SPD); Hans Georg Emde (FDP); Fritz Eschmann (SPD); Bert Even (CDU); Martin Frey (CDU); Liselotte Funcke (FDP); Albrecht Gehring (CDU); Karl Hahn (CDU); Heinrich Hamacher (SPD); Johann Karl Heide (SPD); Rudolf-Ernst Heiland (SPD); Josef Hellenbrock (SPD); Josef Höchst (SPD); Viktor Hoven (FDP); Josef Hufnagel (SPD); Hans Iven (SPD); Maria Jacobi (CDU); Werner Jacobi (SPD); Wenzel Jaksch (SPD); Ernst Keller (FDP); Alma Kettig (SPD); Arthur Killat (SPD); Liesel Kipp-Kaule (SPD); Jakob Koenen (SPD); Willy Könen (SPD); Friedrich Kraus (SPD); Hans Krüger (CDU); Heinz Kühn (SPD); Walther Kühn (FDP); Hubert Lemper (SPD); Ulrich Lohmar (SPD); Manfred Luda (CDU); Karl-Heinz Lünenstraß (SPD); Hans Meis (CDU); Erich Mende (FDP); Walter Menzel (SPD); Josef Mick (CDU); Adolf Müller (CDU); Franzjosef Müser (CDU); Peter Nellen (SPD); Richard Oetzel (CDU); Alfred Ollesch (FDP); Rudolf Opitz (FDP); Maria Pannhoff (CDU); Robert Pferdmenges (CDU); Gerhard Philipp (CDU); Heinz Pöhler (SPD); Arnold Poepke (CDU); Josef Porten (CDU); Egon Ramms (FDP); Luise Rehling (CDU); Walter Rieger (FDP); Margarete Rudoll (SPD); Karl-Heinz Saxowski (SPD); Walter Scheel (FDP); Heinrich Scheppmann (CDU); Josef Scheuren (SPD); Christa Schroeder (CDU); Gustav Stein (CDU); Theodor Teriete (CDU); Helene Weber (CDU); Heinz Wegener (SPD); Heinrich Wehking (CDU); Emmi Welter (CDU); Helene Wessel (SPD); Karl Wienand (SPD); Bernhard Winkelheide (CDU); Hans-Jürgen Wischnewski (SPD); Heinrich Wullenhaupt (CDU); Else Zimmermann (SPD); and Siegfried Zoglmann (FDP).

Substitutions:

- Julius Brecht (SPD) died on 10 July 1962 and was replaced by August Bruse (SPD) on 16 July 1962.
- Helene Weber (CDU) died on 25 July 1962 and was replaced by Margarete Engländer (CDU) on 1 August 1962.
- Robert Pferdmenges (CDU) died on 28 September 1962 and was replaced by Hermann Ehren (CDU) on 4 October 1962.
- Walther Kühn (FDP) died on 4 December 1962 and was replaced by Hedda Heuser (FDP) on 6 December 1962.
- Wolfgang Döring (FDP) died on 17 January 1963 and was replaced by Ewald Krümmer (FDP) on 24 January 1963.
- Heinz Kühn (SPD) resigned on 9 April 1963 and was replaced by Artur Anders (SPD) on 17 April 1963.
- Karl-Heinz Lünenstraß (SPD) died on 16 May 1963 and was replaced by Wilhelm Maibaum (SPD) on 22 May 1963.
- Ernst Keller (FDP) died on 21 July 1963 and was replaced by Volrad Deneke (FDP) on 26 July 1963.
- Walter Menzel (SPD) died on 24 September 1963 and was replaced by Hans-Jürgen Pohlenz (SPD) on 30 September 1963.
- Luise Rehling (CDU) died on 29 May 1964 and was replaced by Curt Becker (CDU) on 11 June 1964.
- Hermann Ehren (CDU) died on 30 November 1964 and was replaced by Maria Stommel (CDU) on 4 December 1964.
- Rudolf-Ernst Heiland (SPD) died on 6 May 1965 and was replaced by Klaus Hübner (SPD) on 13 May 1965.
- Hans-Jürgen Pohlenz (SPD) resigned on 10 June 1965 and was replaced by Wilhelm Ohlemeyer (SPD) on 14 June 1965.

Additional state seats following vacation of constituency seats:

- Heinrich Deist (SPD, Bochum) died on 7 March 1964 and was replaced by Hermann Herberts (SPD) on 12 March 1964.
- Johannes Even (CDU, Bergheim – Euskirchen) died on 24 November 1964 and was replaced by JKarl-Heinz Exner (CDU) on 30 November 1964.
- Matthias Hoogen (CDU, Kempen-Krefeld) resigned on 11 December 1964 and was replaced by Ulrich Berger (CDU) on 22 December 1964.
- Friedrich Wilhelm Willeke (CDU, Recklinghausen-Land) died on 24 June 1965 and was replaced by Josef Rösing (CDU) on 30 June 1965.

==== 1950s ====
===== 1957 =====
Results of the 1957 federal election held on 15 September 1957:

| Party | | Second votes per region | | | | | | | Total votes | % | Seats | | |
| Party | | Aachen | Arnsberg | Cologne | Detmold | Düssel- dorf | Münster | Postal votes | Total votes | % | Con. | Stat. | Tot. |
|---|---|---|---|---|---|---|---|---|---|---|---|---|---|
| Christian Democratic Union of Germany | CDU | 329,698 | 924,647 | 643,541 | 409,447 | 1,508,823 | 681,370 | 316,470 | 4,813,996 | 54.36% | 53 | 34 | 87 |
| Social Democratic Party of Germany | SPD | 121,265 | 773,454 | 303,041 | 324,024 | 985,610 | 365,080 | 93,142 | 2,965,616 | 33.49% | 13 | 41 | 54 |
| Free Democratic Party | FDP | 22,269 | 122,056 | 69,503 | 71,356 | 185,547 | 45,492 | 38,558 | 554,781 | 6.26% | 0 | 11 | 11 |
| All-German Bloc/ League of Expellees and Deprived of Rights | GB/BHE | 6,864 | 50,371 | 28,953 | 36,013 | 62,956 | 31,359 | 8,412 | 224,928 | 2.54% | 0 | 0 | 0 |
| German Party | DP | 6,027 | 29,466 | 16,510 | 24,266 | 40,630 | 14,650 | 9,781 | 141,330 | 1.60% | 0 | 2 | 2 |
| Federalist Union | FU | 2,164 | 11,042 | 4,599 | 7,424 | 20,285 | 24,198 | 2,851 | 72,563 | 0.82% | 0 | 0 | 0 |
| Deutsche Reichspartei | DRP | 2,756 | 21,819 | 10,212 | 13,385 | 22,393 | 7,667 | 3,825 | 57,755 | 0.65% | 0 | 0 | 0 |
| German Middle Class | UDM | 2,756 | 21,819 | 10,212 | 13,385 | 22,393 | 7,667 | 3,825 | 14,412 | 0.16% | 0 | 0 | 0 |
| Bund der Deutschen | BdD | 2,756 | 21,819 | 10,212 | 13,385 | 22,393 | 7,667 | 3,825 | 9,890 | 0.11% | 0 | 0 | 0 |
| Valid votes | | 491,043 | 1,932,855 | 1,076,359 | 885,915 | 2,826,244 | 1,169,816 | 473,039 | 8,855,271 | 100.00% | 66 | 88 | 154 |
| Rejected votes | | 16,783 | 71,904 | 41,135 | 28,684 | 99,249 | 36,433 | 9,469 | 303,657 | 3.32% | | | |
| Total polled | | 507,826 | 2,004,759 | 1,117,494 | 914,599 | 2,925,493 | 1,206,249 | 482,508 | 9,158,928 | 88.01% | | | |
| Registered electors | | 592,146 | 2,400,220 | 1,377,479 | 1,067,481 | 3,555,660 | 1,414,020 | | 10,407,006 | | | | |
| Turnout | | 85.76% | 83.52% | 81.13% | 85.68% | 82.28% | 85.31% | | 88.01% | | | | |

The following candidates were elected:

- State seats - Ernst Achenbach (FDP); Luise Albertz (SPD); Heinrich Auge (SPD); Wolfgang Bartels (CDU); Rudolf Bäumer (CDU); Curt Becker (CDU); Bernhard Bergmeyer (CDU); Kurt Birrenbach (CDU); Valentin Brück (CDU); August Bruse (SPD); Fritz Burgbacher (CDU); Fritz Büttner (SPD); Heinrich Deist (SPD); Hermann Diebäcker (CDU); Wolfgang Döring (FDP); Wilhelm Dopatka (SPD); Otto Dowidat (FDP); Hermann Ehren (CDU); Ernst Theodor Eichelbaum (CDU); Elfriede Eilers (SPD); Margarete Engländer (CDU); Fritz Eschmann (SPD); Bert Even (CDU); Martin Frey (CDU); Lotte Friese-Korn (FDP); Albrecht Gehring (CDU); Alfred Gleisner (SPD); Karl Hahn (CDU); Heinrich Hamacher (SPD); Elfriede Hamelbeck (CDU); Johann Karl Heide (SPD); Rudolf-Ernst Heiland (SPD); Fritz Heinrich (SPD); Josef Hellenbrock (SPD); Carl Hesberg (CDU); Viktor Hoven (FDP); Josef Hufnagel (SPD); Hans Iven (SPD); Werner Jacobi (SPD); Ernst Keller (FDP); Alma Kettig (SPD); Georg Richard Kinat (SPD); Liesel Kipp-Kaule (SPD); Georg Kliesing (CDU); Jakob Koenen (SPD); Willy Könen (SPD); Waldemar Kraft (CDU); Friedrich Kraus (SPD); Herbert Kriedemann (SPD); Hans Krüger (CDU); Heinz Kühn (SPD); Walther Kühn (FDP); Erwin Lange (SPD); Wilhelm Lantermann (SPD); Ulrich Lohmar (SPD); Karl-Heinz Lünenstraß (SPD); Erich Mende (FDP); Theodor Mengelkamp (CDU); Josef Mick (CDU); Maria Niggemeyer (CDU); Richard Oetzel (CDU); Maria Pannhoff (CDU); Robert Pferdmenges (CDU); Gerhard Philipp (CDU); Heinz Pöhler (SPD); Victor-Emanuel Preusker (DP); Severin Fritz Pütz (SPD); Egon Ramms (FDP); Hugo Rasch (SPD); Josef Rösing (CDU); Margarete Rudoll (SPD); Walter Scheel (FDP); Heinrich Scheppmann (CDU); Heinrich Schild (DP); Viktoria Steinbiß (CDU); Theodor Teriete (CDU); Hanns Theis (SPD); Helene Weber (CDU); Heinz Wegener (SPD); Heinrich Wehking (CDU); Erwin Welke (SPD); Heinrich Welslau (SPD); Emmi Welter (CDU); Helene Wessel (SPD); Karl Wienand (SPD); Hans-Jürgen Wischnewski (SPD); Heinrich Wullenhaupt (CDU); and Siegfried Zoglmann (FDP).

Substitutions:

- Fritz Heinrich (SPD) died on 7 March 1959 and was replaced by Arthur Killat (SPD) on 19 March 1959.
- Alfred Gleisner (SPD) resigned on 17 March 1959 and was replaced by Josef Scheuren (SPD) on 20 March 1959.
- Hugo Rasch (SPD) died on 15 September 1960 and was replaced by Wilhelm Altvater (SPD) on 22 September 1960.
- Johannes Brüns (CDU) resigned on 28 November 1960 and was replaced by Josef Rommerskirchen (CDU) on 12 December 1960.

Additional state seats following vacation of constituency seats:

- Wilhelm Mellies (SPD, Lemgo) died on 19 May 1958 and was replaced by Otto Striebeck (SPD) on 27 May 1958.
- Karl Arnold (CDU, Geilenkirchen – Erkelenz – Jülich) died on 29 June 1958 and was replaced by Hans Meis (CDU) on 2 July 1958.
- Franz Meyers (CDU, Aachen-Stadt) resigned on 4 September 1958 and was replaced by Hermann A. Eplée (CDU) on 8 September 1958.
- Josef Gockeln (CDU, Düsseldorf I) died on 6 December 1958 and was replaced by Caspar Krüger (CDU) on 15 December 1958.
- Heinrich Lübke (CDU, Rees – Dinslaken) resigned on 2 September 1959 and was replaced by Hanns-Gero von Lindeiner genannt von Wildau (CDU) on 8 September 1959.
- Fritz Berendsen (CDU, Duisburg II) resigned on 15 September 1959 and was replaced by Gerhard Kisters (CDU) on 21 September 1959.
- Johannes Kunze (CDU, Iserlohn-Stadt und -Land) died on 11 October 1959 and was replaced by Johannes Brüns (CDU) on 26 October 1959.
- Fritz Hellwig (CDU, Cologne II) resigned on 30 November 1959 and was replaced by Dietrich Hahne (CDU) on 7 December 1959.
- Otto Walpert (SPD, Bielefeld-Stadt) resigned on 12 January 1960 and was replaced by Hubert Jungherz (SPD) on 19 January 1960.

===== 1953 =====
Results of the 1953 federal election held on 6 September 1953:

| Party | | Second votes per region | | | | | | Total votes | % | Seats | | |
| Party | | Aachen | Arnsberg | Cologne | Detmold | Düssel- dorf | Münster | Total votes | % | Con. | Stat. | Tot. |
|---|---|---|---|---|---|---|---|---|---|---|---|---|
| Christian Democratic Union of Germany | CDU | 292,392 | 829,511 | 564,012 | 370,912 | 1,262,221 | 596,272 | 3,915,320 | 48.89% | 51 | 21 | 72 |
| Social Democratic Party of Germany | SPD | 111,353 | 687,517 | 279,181 | 309,497 | 839,376 | 326,090 | 2,553,014 | 31.88% | 13 | 34 | 47 |
| Free Democratic Party | FDP | 30,715 | 174,268 | 94,243 | 105,320 | 224,733 | 53,623 | 682,902 | 8.53% | 1 | 11 | 12 |
| Communist Party of Germany | KPD | 8,538 | 57,672 | 20,332 | 9,519 | 101,313 | 31,218 | 228,592 | 2.85% | 0 | 0 | 0 |
| Centre Party | Z | 5,304 | 33,919 | 14,861 | 20,925 | 79,370 | 62,699 | 217,078 | 2.71% | 1 | 2 | 3 |
| All-German Bloc/ League of Expellees and Deprived of Rights | GB/BHE | 6,113 | 49,700 | 26,986 | 41,369 | 55,288 | 34,495 | 213,951 | 2.67% | 0 | 3 | 3 |
| All-German People's Party | GVP | 4,082 | 33,060 | 11,261 | 11,073 | 49,791 | 8,271 | 117,538 | 1.47% | 0 | 0 | 0 |
| German Party | DP | 3,346 | 16,461 | 11,058 | 14,543 | 25,840 | 8,786 | 80,034 | 1.00% | 0 | 1 | 1 |
| Valid votes | | 461,843 | 1,882,108 | 1,021,934 | 883,158 | 2,637,932 | 1,121,454 | 8,008,429 | 100.00% | 66 | 72 | 138 |
| Rejected votes | | 19,661 | 56,380 | 30,292 | 28,707 | 75,433 | 32,059 | 242,532 | 2.94% | | | |
| Total polled | | 481,504 | 1,938,488 | 1,052,226 | 911,865 | 2,713,365 | 1,153,513 | 8,250,961 | 85.96% | | | |
| Registered electors | | 552,108 | 2,225,882 | 1,254,445 | 1,026,462 | 3,231,109 | 1,309,103 | 9,599,109 | | | | |
| Turnout | | 87.21% | 87.09% | 83.88% | 88.84% | 83.98% | 88.11% | 85.96% | | | | |

The following candidates were elected:

- State seats - Luise Albertz (SPD); Bernhard Bergmeyer (CDU); Martin Blank (FDP); Franz Blücher (FDP); Hans Böhm (SPD); Franz Böhner (Z); Valentin Brück (CDU); August Bruse (SPD); Dietrich Bürkel (CDU); Robert Daum (SPD); Heinrich Deist (SPD); Hermann Ehren (CDU); Fritz Eschmann (SPD); Lotte Friese-Korn (FDP); Wilhelm Gefeller (SPD); Heinz Gemein (GB/BHE); Heinrich Glasmeyer (CDU); Alfred Gleisner (SPD); Robert Görlinger (SPD); Karl Hahn (CDU); Werner Hansen (SPD); Johann Karl Heide (SPD); Rudolf-Ernst Heiland (SPD); Fritz Heinrich (SPD); Martin Heix (Z); Josef Hellenbrock (SPD); Carl Hesberg (CDU); Josef Hufnagel (SPD); Werner Jacobi (SPD); Linus Kather (CDU); Alma Kettig (SPD); Georg Richard Kinat (SPD); Liesel Kipp-Kaule (SPD); Georg Kliesing (CDU); Jakob Koenen (SPD); Walther Kolbe (CDU); Willy Könen (SPD); Georg Körner (GB/BHE); Heinz Kühn (SPD); Walther Kühn (FDP); Erwin Lange (SPD); Hubertus, Prince of Löwenstein-Wertheim-Freudenberg (FDP); Gerhard Lütkens (SPD); Hasso von Manteuffel (FDP); Erich Mende (FDP); Trudel Meyer (SPD); Friedrich Middelhauve (FDP); Matthias Moll (SPD); Richard Oetzel (CDU); Helmut Petersen (GB/BHE); Robert Pferdmenges (CDU); Wolfgang Pohle (CDU); Heinz Pöhler (SPD); Hugo Rasch (SPD); Margarete Rudoll (SPD); Hermann Runge (SPD); Wilmar Sabaßg (CDU); Walter Scheel (FDP); Heinrich Scheppmann (CDU); Josef Scheuren (SPD); Heinrich Schild (DP); Hermann Schwann (FDP); Viktoria Steinbiß (CDU); Wilhelm Tenhagen (SPD); Theodor Teriete (CDU); Heinrich Voß (CDU); Heinrich Wehking (CDU); Erwin Welke (SPD); Willi Weyer (FDP); Hugo Wiedeck (CDU); Karl Wienand (SPD); and Heinrich Wullenhaupt (CDU).

Substitutions:

- Walther Kolbe (CDU) died on 25 December 1953 and was replaced by Emmi Welter (CDU) on 4 January 1954.
- Robert Görlinger (SPD) died on 10 February 1954 and was replaced by Paul Putzig (SPD) on 13 February 1954.
- Wilhelm Tenhagen (SPD) died on 22 August 1954 and was replaced by Friedhelm Missmahl (SPD) on 1 September 1954.
- Friedrich Middelhauve (FDP) resigned on 10 September 1954 and was replaced by Fritz Held (FDP) on 13 September 1954.
- Willi Weyer (FDP) resigned on 17 September 1954 and was replaced by Paul Luchtenberg (FDP) on 18 September 1954.
- Gerhard Lütkens (SPD) died on 17 November 1955 and was replaced by Wilhelm Dopatka (SPD) on 21 November 1955.
- Paul Luchtenberg (FDP) resigned on 9 April 1956 and was replaced by Hubertus von Golitschek (FDP) on 18 April 1956.
- Hans Böhm (SPD) died on 18 July 1957 and was replaced by Luise Peter (SPD) on 24 July 1957.
- Valentin Brück (CDU) resigned on 17 September 1957 and was replaced by Heinrich Windelen (CDU) on 28 September 1957.

Additional state seats following vacation of constituency seats:

- Carl Wirths (FDP, Wuppertal I) died on 16 June 1955 and was replaced by Hermann Berg (FDP) on 27 June 1955.

==== 1940s ====
===== 1949 =====
Results of the 1949 federal election held on 14 August 1949:

| Party | | Votes | % | Seats | | |
| Party | | Votes | % | Con. | Stat. | Tot. |
|---|---|---|---|---|---|---|
| Christian Democratic Union of Germany | CDU | 2,481,523 | 36.89% | 40 | 3 | 43 |
| Social Democratic Party of Germany | SPD | 2,109,172 | 31.36% | 25 | 12 | 37 |
| Centre Party | Z | 601,435 | 8.94% | 0 | 10 | 10 |
| Free Democratic Party | FDP | 581,456 | 8.64% | 1 | 9 | 10 |
| Communist Party of Germany | KPD | 513,225 | 7.63% | 0 | 9 | 9 |
| Independents | Ind | 157,155 | 2.34% | 0 | 0 | 0 |
| Radical Social Freedom Party | RSF | 142,648 | 2.12% | 0 | 0 | 0 |
| German Conservative Party–German Right Party | DKP-DRP | 117,998 | 1.75% | 0 | 0 | 0 |
| Rheinish-Westfalian People's Party | RWVP | 21,931 | 0.33% | 0 | 0 | 0 |
| Valid votes | | 6,726,543 | 100.00% | 66 | 43 | 109 |
| Rejected votes | | 183,176 | 2.65% | | | |
| Total polled | | 6,909,719 | 79.59% | | | |
| Registered electors | | 8,681,794 | | | | |

The following candidates were elected:

- State seats - Willi Agatz (KPD); Luise Albertz (SPD); Rudolf Amelunxen (Z); Thea Arnold (Z); Martin Blank (FDP); Franz Blücher (FDP); Karl Brunner (SPD); Gregor Determann (Z); Willi Eichler (SPD); Heinrich Glasmeyer (Z); Robert Görlinger (SPD); Arthur Grundmann (FDP); Wilhelm Hamacher (Z); Heinrich Happe (SPD); Paul Harig (KPD); Rudolf-Ernst Heiland (SPD); Hermann Höpker-Aschoff (FDP); Werner Jacobi (SPD); Paul Krause (Z); Albert Ludwig Juncker (FDP); Georg Richard Kinat (SPD); Liesel Kipp-Kaule (SPD); Walther Kühn (FDP); Johannes Kunze (CDU); Gerhard Lütkens (SPD); Erich Mende (FDP); Walter Menzel (SPD); Friedrich Middelhauve (FDP); Kurt Müller (KPD); Otto Pannenbecker (Z); Hugo Paul (KPD); Hans Albrecht Freiherr von Rechenberg (FDP); Max Reimann (KPD); Bernhard Reismann (Z); Heinz Renner (KPD); Gerhard Ribbeheger (Z); Friedrich Rische (KPD); Günther Sewald (CDU); Viktoria Steinbiß (CDU); Grete Thiele (KPD); Walter Vesper (KPD); August Weinhold (SPD); and Helene Wessel (Z).

Substitutions:

- Rudolf Amelunxen (Z) resigned on 7 October 1949 and was replaced by Helmut Bertram (Z) on 3 November 1949.
- Günther Sewald (CDU) died on 25 November 1949 and was replaced by Robert Pferdmenges (CDU) on 12 January 1950.
- Friedrich Middelhauve (FDP) resigned on 17 October 1950 and was replaced by Paul Luchtenberg (FDP) on 30 October 1950.
- Paul Krause (Z) died on 18 October 1950 and was replaced by Alex Willenberg (Z) on 26 October 1950.
- Wilhelm Hamacher (Z) died on 29 July 1951 and was replaced by Johannes Hoffmann (Z) on 7 August 1951.
- Hermann Höpker-Aschoff (FDP) resigned on 9 September 1951 and was replaced by Oscar Funcke (FDP) on 14 September 1951.
- Karl Brunner (SPD) died on 13 November 1951 and was replaced by Maria Ansorge (SPD) on 17 November 1951.
- Walter Vesper (KPD) resigned on 30 June 1952 and was replaced by Heinrich Niebes (KPD) on 10 July 1952.
- Hans Albrecht Freiherr von Rechenberg (FDP) died on 19 January 1953 and was replaced by Paul Hans Jaeger (FDP) on 22 January 1953.

Additional state seats following vacation of constituency seats: (Note: Prior to 1953 vacant constituency seats were replaced by holding a by-election.)

- Franz Etzel (CDU, Rees – Dinslaken) resigned on 4 January 1953 and was replaced by Johannes Handschumacher (CDU) on 21 January 1953.
- Friedrich Holzapfel (CDU, Warburg – Höxter – Büren) resigned on 20 January 1953 and was replaced by Richard Oetzel (CDU) on 24 January 1953.
- Erik Nölting (SPD, Iserlohn) died on 15 July 1953 and was replaced by Franz Heinen (SPD) on 24 July 1953.
