= List of members of the 4th Bundestag =

←	3rd	5th	→

Overview
- Legislative body: Bundestag
- Term: October 17, 1961 – October 17, 1965
- Election: 1961 West German federal election
- Government: Fourth Adenauer cabinet First Erhard cabinet
- Members: 521
- President of the Bundestag: Eugen Gerstenmaier

The 4th German Bundestag, the lower house of parliament of the Federal Republic of Germany, was elected on 17 September 1961 and existed between 17 October 1961 and 17 October 1965. It held a total of 198 parliamentary sessions, with the last one being held on 23 July 1965.

On 7 November 1961 the Bundestag elected Konrad Adenauer as federal chancellor of the Federal Republic of Germany on the first ballot with 258 yes votes, 206 no votes and 16 abstentions. After Adenauer resigned on 15 October 1963 Ludwig Erhard (CDU) was elected as his successor on 16 October 1963.

== Presidium of the Bundestag ==
Robert Pferdmenges of the CDU served as Alterspräsident (Father of the House), after Konrad Adneuauer (CDU) who should have had this role, had rejected it, because he considered it inappropriate for the incumbent federal chancellor to serve as Alterspräsident. He presided over the Konstituierende Sitzung of the Bundestag, the first session of a new legislative Term, until Eugen Gerstenmeier was elected as President of the Bundestag.

The Members of the Bundestag Carlo Schmid, Erwin Schoettle (both from the SPD), Richard Jeager (CSU) and Thomas Dehler (FDP) were nominated to serve as vice-presidents of the Bundestag. All of the candidates except for Schoettle had held this office during the previous legislative term, the 3rd German Bundestag. Before the election arose a short discussion over the fact that the SPD parliamentary caucaus demanded to vice-presidents. All of the candidates were elected with a large majority in a non-secret ballot. All of the candidates participated in the election.

Eugen Gerstenmaier was again elected president of the Bundestag with 463 yes votes, 36 abstensions and 5 invald votes. He was elected by a larger vote share than in 1957.

== Composition of the Bundestag ==

Although the CDU/CSU lost their absolute majority, they still remained the largest party. They won a total of 242 seats as well as 9 non-voting delegates from West Berlin. The SPD increased their seats winning 190 and 13 non-voting delegates from West Berlin. It was the first time that the SPD did not nominate their chairman as Chancellor candidate. Instead they chose Willy Brandt who was Governing Mayor of Berlin at that time and who would later become the first SPD Chancellor in the Federal Republic of Germany. With 67 seats the FDP had also won more seats than they had won in the previous election.

== Summary ==
This summary includes changes in the numbers of the three caucuses (CDU/CSU, SPD, FDP):

Time	Reason of change	CDU/CSU	SPD	FDP	Others	Total number
1961	First meeting	242	190	67		499
20 September 1962	Wilhelm Gontrum leaves the CDU/CSU caucus and becomes unaffiliated	241	190	67	1	499
3 June 1964	Wolfgang Stammberger leaves the FDP caucus and become members of the SPD caucus	241	191	66	1	499

== Members ==
The following is the list of members of the 4th Bundestag.

State	No.	Constituency	Member	Party
Schleswig-Holstein	1	Husum – Südtondern – Eiderstedt	Christian Giencke	CDU
Schleswig-Holstein	2	Flensburg	Will Rasner	CDU
Schleswig-Holstein	3	Schleswig – Eckernförde	Gerhard Stoltenberg	CDU
Schleswig-Holstein	4	Norder- und Süderdithmarschen	Hermann Glüsing	CDU
Schleswig-Holstein	5	Rendsburg	Detlef Struve	CDU
Schleswig-Holstein	6	Kiel	Fritz Baade	SPD
Schleswig-Holstein	7	Plön – Eutin/Nord	Heinrich Gerns (Note: Heinrich Gerns died on 20 August 1963.)	CDU
Schleswig-Holstein	8	Oldenburg – Eutin/Süd	Friedrich-Karl Storm	CDU
Schleswig-Holstein	9	Lübeck	Helmut Wendelborn	CDU
Schleswig-Holstein	10	Segeberg – Neumünster	Hans Blöcker	CDU
Schleswig-Holstein	11	Steinburg	Ernst Engelbrecht-Greve (Note: Ernst Engelbrecht-Greve resigned on 7 December 1962.)	CDU
Schleswig-Holstein	12	Pinneberg	Wilhelm Goldhagen (Note: Wilhelm Goldhagen died on 7 January 1964.)	CDU
Schleswig-Holstein	13	Stormarn	Werner Schwarz	CDU
Schleswig-Holstein	14	Herzogtum Lauenburg	Otto Christian Archibald von Bismarck	CDU
Schleswig-Holstein	List		Bruno Diekmann	SPD
Schleswig-Holstein	List		Kurt Pohle (Note: Kurt Pohle died on 3 November 1961.)	SPD
Schleswig-Holstein	List		Karl Regling	SPD
Schleswig-Holstein	List		Reinhold Rehs	SPD
Schleswig-Holstein	List		Annemarie Renger	SPD
Schleswig-Holstein	List		Fritz Sänger	SPD
Schleswig-Holstein	List		Richard Tamblé	SPD
Schleswig-Holstein	List		Detlef Haase (Note: Detlef Haase took office on 10 November 1961, to succeed Kurt Pohle.)	SPD
Schleswig-Holstein	List		Otto Eisenmann	FDP
Schleswig-Holstein	List		Wolfgang Imle	FDP
Schleswig-Holstein	List		Walter Peters	FDP
Schleswig-Holstein	List		Hans-Jürgen Klinker (Note: Hans-Jürgen Klinker took office on 10 December 1962, to succeed Ernst Engelbrecht-Greve.)	CDU
Schleswig-Holstein	List		Walter Richard Gerlich (Note: Walter Richard Gerlich took office on 24 August 1963, to succeed Heinrich Gerns.)	CDU
Schleswig-Holstein	List		Marlis Gräfin vom Hagen (Note: Marlis Gräfin vom Hagen took office on 20 January 1964, to succeed Wilhelm Goldhagen.)	CDU
Hamburg	15	Hamburg I	Hellmut Kalbitzer	SPD
Hamburg	16	Hamburg II	Karl Wilhelm Berkhan	SPD
Hamburg	17	Hamburg III	Peter Blachstein	SPD
Hamburg	18	Hamburg IV	Max Brauer	SPD
Hamburg	19	Hamburg V	Irma Keilhack (Note: Irma Keilhack resigned on 19 January 1962.)	SPD
Hamburg	20	Hamburg VI	Nikolaus Jürgensen	SPD
Hamburg	21	Hamburg VII	Herbert Wehner	SPD
Hamburg	22	Hamburg VIII	Helmut Schmidt (Note: Helmut Schmidt resigned on 19 January 1962.)	SPD
Hamburg	List		Irma Blohm	CDU
Hamburg	List		Erik Blumenfeld	CDU
Hamburg	List		Gerd Bucerius (Note: Gerd Bucerius resigned on 22 March 1962.)	CDU
Hamburg	List		Heinrich Gewandt	CDU
Hamburg	List		Dietrich Rollmann (Note: Dietrich Rollmann took office on 7 March 1960, to succeed Paul Leverkuehn.)	CDU
Hamburg	List		Roland Seffrin	CDU
Hamburg	List		Georg Schneider (Note: Georg Schneider took office on 27 March 1962, to succeed Gerd Bucerius.)	CDU
Hamburg	List		Rolf Dahlgrün	FDP
Hamburg	List		Emilie Kiep-Altenloh	FDP
Hamburg	List		Willy Max Rademacher	FDP
Hamburg	List		Ilse Elsner	SPD
Hamburg	List		Eugen Glombig (Note: Eugen Glombig took office on 25 January 1962, to succeed Helmut Schmidt.)	SPD
Hamburg	List		Arthur Busch (Note: Arthur Busch took office on 26 January 1962, to succeed Irma Keilhack.)	SPD
Lower Saxony	23	Aurich – Emden	Georg Peters	SPD
Lower Saxony	24	Leer	Hermann Conring	CDU
Lower Saxony	25	Wilhelmshaven – Friesland	Johann Cramer	SPD
Lower Saxony	26	Emsland	Josef Stecker	CDU
Lower Saxony	27	Bersenbrück – Lingen	Clemens Hesemann	CDU
Lower Saxony	28	Osnabrück-Stadt und -Land	Anton Storch	CDU
Lower Saxony	29	Delmenhorst – Wesermarsch	Heinrich Müller	SPD
Lower Saxony	30	Oldenburg – Ammerland	Wilhelm Nieberg	CDU
Lower Saxony	31	Vechta – Cloppenburg	Kurt Schmücker	CDU
Lower Saxony	32	Cuxhaven – Hadeln – Wesermünde	Hans Hermsdorf	SPD
Lower Saxony	33	Stade – Bremervörde	Peter Tobaben	CDU
Lower Saxony	34	Verden – Rotenburg – Osterholz	Karl Ravens	SPD
Lower Saxony	35	Lüneburg – Dannenberg	Lambert Huys	CDU
Lower Saxony	36	Harburg – Soltau	Hans-Christoph Seebohm	CDU
Lower Saxony	37	Fallingbostel – Hoya	Artur Missbach	CDU
Lower Saxony	38	Celle	Wilhelm Brese	CDU
Lower Saxony	39	Uelzen	Walter Pflaumbaum	CDU
Lower Saxony	40	Stadt Hannover-Nord	Egon Franke	SPD
Lower Saxony	41	Stadt Hannover-Süd	Erich Ollenhauer (Note: Erich Ollenhauer died on 14 December 1963.)	SPD
Lower Saxony	42	Hannover-Land	Werner Marquardt	SPD
Lower Saxony	43	Neustadt – Grafschaft Schaumburg	Ernst Weltner	SPD
Lower Saxony	44	Nienburg – Schaumburg-Lippe	Gustav Heinemann	SPD
Lower Saxony	45	Diepholz – Melle – Wittlage	Karl Gossel	CDU
Lower Saxony	46	Hameln – Springe	Heinz Frehsee	SPD
Lower Saxony	47	Alfeld – Holzminden	Elinor Hubert	SPD
Lower Saxony	48	Hildesheim-Stadt und -Land	Friedrich Kühn	CDU
Lower Saxony	49	Gandersheim – Salzgitter	Hans-Jürgen Junghans	SPD
Lower Saxony	50	Stadt Braunschweig	Walter Schmidt	SPD
Lower Saxony	51	Braunschweig-Land – Helmstedt	Alfred Burgemeister	CDU
Lower Saxony	52	Wolfenbüttel – Goslar-Land	Heinz Morgenstern	SPD
Lower Saxony	53	Harz	Kurt Schröder (Note: Kurt Schröder died on 6 September 1964.)	SPD
Lower Saxony	54	Peine – Gifhorn	Uwe-Jens Nissen (Note: Uwe-Jens Nissen resigned on 1 October 1964.)	SPD
Lower Saxony	55	Northeim – Einbeck – Duderstadt	Martin Schmidt	SPD
Lower Saxony	56	Göttingen-Münden	Günter Frede	SPD
Lower Saxony	List		Georg Böhme	CDU
Lower Saxony	List		Alexander Elbrächter	CDU
Lower Saxony	List		Gerhard Jungmann	CDU
Lower Saxony	List		Margot Kalinke	CDU
Lower Saxony	List		Ernst Kuntscher	CDU
Lower Saxony	List		Hans-Joachim von Merkatz	CDU
Lower Saxony	List		J. Hermann Siemer	CDU
Lower Saxony	List		Willy Steinmetz	CDU
Lower Saxony	List		Franz Varelmann	CDU
Lower Saxony	List		Elisabeth Vietje (Note: Elisabeth Vietje died on 2 May 1963.)	CDU
Lower Saxony	List		Rudolf Werner	CDU
Lower Saxony	List		Theodor Oberländer (Note: Theodor Oberländer took office on 9 May 1963, to succeed Elisabeth Vietje.)	CDU
Lower Saxony	List		Hedi Flitz	FDP
Lower Saxony	List		Walther Hellige	FDP
Lower Saxony	List		Reinhold Kreitmeyer	FDP
Lower Saxony	List		Fritz Logemann	FDP
Lower Saxony	List		Konrad Mälzig	FDP
Lower Saxony	List		Herwart Miessner	FDP
Lower Saxony	List		Heinrich Sander	FDP
Lower Saxony	List		Friedrich Soetebier	FDP
Lower Saxony	List		Gerold Wächter	FDP
Lower Saxony	List		Horst Gerlach	SPD
Lower Saxony	List		Walter Harm (Note: Walter Harm died on 10 August 1964.)	SPD
Lower Saxony	List		Lisa Korspeter	SPD
Lower Saxony	List		Johannes Lücke	SPD
Lower Saxony	List		Moritz-Ernst Priebe	SPD
Lower Saxony	List		Helmut Rohde	SPD
Lower Saxony	List		Willi Wolf (Note: Willi Wolf took office on 19 December 1963, to succeed Erich Ollenhauer.)	SPD
Lower Saxony	List		Kurt Ross (Note: Kurt Ross took office on 18 August 1964, to succeed Walter Harm.)	SPD
Lower Saxony	List		Helmut Schlüter (Note: Helmut Schlüter took office on 11 September 1964, to succeed Kurt Schröder.)	SPD
Lower Saxony	List		Gerhard Reichhardt (Note: Gerhard Reichhardt took office on 5 October 1964, to succeed Uwe-Jens Nissen.)	SPD
Bremen	57	Bremen-Ost	Hermann Hansing	SPD
Bremen	58	Bremen-West	Hans Stefan Seifriz	SPD
Bremen	59	Bremerhaven – Bremen-Nord	Werner Lenz	SPD
Bremen	List		Ernst Müller-Hermann	CDU
Bremen	List		Karl Löbe	FDP
North Rhine-Westphalia	60	Aachen-Stadt	Edmund Sinn	CDU
North Rhine-Westphalia	61	Aachen-Land	Josef Müller	CDU
North Rhine-Westphalia	62	Geilenkirchen – Erkelenz – Jülich	Fritz Burgbacher	CDU
North Rhine-Westphalia	63	Düren – Monschau – Schleiden	Bernhard Günther	CDU
North Rhine-Westphalia	64	Bergheim (Erft) – Euskirchen	Johannes Even (Note: Johannes Even died on 24 November 1964.)	CDU
North Rhine-Westphalia	65	Köln-Land	Aloys Lenz	CDU
North Rhine-Westphalia	66	Cologne I	Aenne Brauksiepe	CDU
North Rhine-Westphalia	67	Cologne II	Carl Hesberg	CDU
North Rhine-Westphalia	68	Cologne III	Hans Katzer	CDU
North Rhine-Westphalia	69	Bonn-Stadt und -Land	Konrad Adenauer	CDU
North Rhine-Westphalia	70	Siegkreis	Georg Kliesing	CDU
North Rhine-Westphalia	71	Oberbergischer Kreis	August Dresbach	CDU
North Rhine-Westphalia	72	Rheinisch-Bergischer Kreis	Paul Lücke	CDU
North Rhine-Westphalia	73	Rhein-Wupper-Kreis – Leverkusen	Peter Wilhelm Brand	CDU
North Rhine-Westphalia	74	Remscheid – Solingen	Franz Etzel	CDU
North Rhine-Westphalia	75	Wuppertal I	Otto Schmidt	CDU
North Rhine-Westphalia	76	Wuppertal II	Hans Rauhaus	CDU
North Rhine-Westphalia	77	Düsseldorf-Mettmann	Gerhard Schröder	CDU
North Rhine-Westphalia	78	Düsseldorf I	Gottfried Arnold	CDU
North Rhine-Westphalia	79	Düsseldorf II	Georg Schulhoff	CDU
North Rhine-Westphalia	80	Neuss – Grevenbroich	Josef Rommerskirchen	CDU
North Rhine-Westphalia	81	Krefeld	Günther Serres	CDU
North Rhine-Westphalia	82	Rheydt – M. Gladbach – Viersen	Joseph Illerhaus	CDU
North Rhine-Westphalia	83	Kempen-Krefeld	Matthias Hoogen (Note: Matthias Hoogen resigned on 11 December 1964.)	CDU
North Rhine-Westphalia	84	Moers	Fritz Büttner	SPD
North Rhine-Westphalia	85	Geldern – Kleve	Felix von Vittinghoff-Schell	CDU
North Rhine-Westphalia	86	Rees – Dinslaken	Arnold Verhoeven	CDU
North Rhine-Westphalia	87	Oberhausen	Martin Heix	CDU
North Rhine-Westphalia	88	Mülheim	Otto Striebeck	SPD
North Rhine-Westphalia	89	Essen I	Erwin Lange	SPD
North Rhine-Westphalia	90	Essen II	Karl Bergmann	SPD
North Rhine-Westphalia	91	Essen III	Hans Toussaint	CDU
North Rhine-Westphalia	92	Duisburg I	Eberhard Brünen	SPD
North Rhine-Westphalia	93	Duisburg II	Hanns Theis	SPD
North Rhine-Westphalia	94	Borken – Bocholt – Ahaus	Theodor Blank	CDU
North Rhine-Westphalia	95	Steinfurt – Tecklenburg	Franz Falke	CDU
North Rhine-Westphalia	96	Beckum – Warendorf	Heinrich Windelen	CDU
North Rhine-Westphalia	97	Münster-Stadt und -Land	Hermann Diebäcker	CDU
North Rhine-Westphalia	98	Lüdinghausen – Coesfeld	Heinrich Hörnemann	CDU
North Rhine-Westphalia	99	Gelsenkirchen	Walter Arendt	SPD
North Rhine-Westphalia	100	Recklinghausen-Land	Friedrich Wilhelm Willeke	CDU
North Rhine-Westphalia	101	Recklinghausen-Stadt	Heinrich Auge	SPD
North Rhine-Westphalia	102	Gladbeck – Bottrop	Johann Harnischfeger	CDU
North Rhine-Westphalia	103	Warburg – Höxter – Büren	Josef Menke	CDU
North Rhine-Westphalia	104	Paderborn – Wiedenbrück	Rainer Barzel	CDU
North Rhine-Westphalia	105	Bielefeld – Halle	Heinrich Junker	SPD
North Rhine-Westphalia	106	Bielefeld-Stadt	Gerhard Koch	SPD
North Rhine-Westphalia	107	Herford-Stadt und -Land	Rudolf Bäumer	SPD
North Rhine-Westphalia	108	Detmold	August Berlin	SPD
North Rhine-Westphalia	109	Lemgo	Heinrich Welslau	SPD
North Rhine-Westphalia	110	Minden – Lübbecke	Paul Bleiß	SPD
North Rhine-Westphalia	111	Wattenscheid – Wanne-Eickel	Erich Meyer	SPD
North Rhine-Westphalia	112	Herne – Castrop-Rauxel	Herbert Kriedemann	SPD
North Rhine-Westphalia	113	Ennepe-Ruhr – Witten	Wilhelm Michels	SPD
North Rhine-Westphalia	114	Hagen	Fritz Steinhoff	SPD
North Rhine-Westphalia	115	Dortmund I	Heinrich Stephan	SPD
North Rhine-Westphalia	116	Dortmund II	Willi Beuster	SPD
North Rhine-Westphalia	117	Dortmund III – Lünen	Walter Behrendt	SPD
North Rhine-Westphalia	118	Bochum	Heinrich Deist (Note: Heinrich Deist died on 7 March 1964.)	SPD
North Rhine-Westphalia	119	Iserlohn-Stadt und -Land	Theodor Mengelkamp	CDU
North Rhine-Westphalia	120	Unna – Hamm	Werner Figgen	SPD
North Rhine-Westphalia	121	Meschede – Olpe	Franz Lenze	CDU
North Rhine-Westphalia	122	Arnsberg – Soest	Ernst Majonica	CDU
North Rhine-Westphalia	123	Lippstadt – Brilon	Bernhard Balkenhol	CDU
North Rhine-Westphalia	124	Altena – Lüdenscheid	Erwin Welke	SPD
North Rhine-Westphalia	125	Siegen-Stadt und Land – Wittgenstein	Hermann Schmidt	SPD
North Rhine-Westphalia	List		Karl Bewerunge	CDU
North Rhine-Westphalia	List		Kurt Birrenbach	CDU
North Rhine-Westphalia	List		Ernst von Bodelschwingh	CDU
North Rhine-Westphalia	List		Valentin Brück	CDU
North Rhine-Westphalia	List		Rembert van Delden	CDU
North Rhine-Westphalia	List		Hans Dichgans	CDU
North Rhine-Westphalia	List		Ernst Theodor Eichelbaum	CDU
North Rhine-Westphalia	List		Bert Even	CDU
North Rhine-Westphalia	List		Martin Frey	CDU
North Rhine-Westphalia	List		Albrecht Gehring	CDU
North Rhine-Westphalia	List		Karl Hahn	CDU
North Rhine-Westphalia	List		Josef Höchst	CDU
North Rhine-Westphalia	List		Maria Jacobi	CDU
North Rhine-Westphalia	List		Hans Krüger	CDU
North Rhine-Westphalia	List		Manfred Luda	CDU
North Rhine-Westphalia	List		Hans Meis	CDU
North Rhine-Westphalia	List		Josef Mick	CDU
North Rhine-Westphalia	List		Adolf Müller	CDU
North Rhine-Westphalia	List		Franzjosef Müser	CDU
North Rhine-Westphalia	List		Richard Oetzel	CDU
North Rhine-Westphalia	List		Maria Pannhoff	CDU
North Rhine-Westphalia	List		Robert Pferdmenges (Note: Robert Pferdmenges died on 28 September 1962.)	CDU
North Rhine-Westphalia	List		Gerhard Philipp	CDU
North Rhine-Westphalia	List		Arnold Poepke	CDU
North Rhine-Westphalia	List		Josef Porten	CDU
North Rhine-Westphalia	List		Luise Rehling (Note: Luise Rehling died on 29 May 1964.)	CDU
North Rhine-Westphalia	List		Heinrich Scheppmann	CDU
North Rhine-Westphalia	List		Christa Schroeder	CDU
North Rhine-Westphalia	List		Gustav Stein	CDU
North Rhine-Westphalia	List		Theodor Teriete	CDU
North Rhine-Westphalia	List		Helene Weber (Note: Helene Weber died on 25 July 1962.)	CDU
North Rhine-Westphalia	List		Heinrich Wehking	CDU
North Rhine-Westphalia	List		Emmi Welter	CDU
North Rhine-Westphalia	List		Bernhard Winkelheide	CDU
North Rhine-Westphalia	List		Heinrich Wullenhaupt	CDU
North Rhine-Westphalia	List		Margarete Engländer (Note: Margarete Engländer took office on 1 August 1962, to succeed Helene Weber.)	CDU
North Rhine-Westphalia	List		Hermann Ehren (Note: Hermann Ehren took office on 4 October 1962, to succeed Robert Pferdmenges, but later died on 30 November 1964.)	CDU
North Rhine-Westphalia	List		Curt Becker (Note: Curt Becker took office on 11 June 1964, to succeed Luise Rehling.)	CDU
North Rhine-Westphalia	List		Karl-Heinz Exner (Note: Karl-Heinz Exner took office on 30 November 1964, to succeed Johannes Even.)	CDU
North Rhine-Westphalia	List		Maria Stommel (Note: Maria Stommel took office on 4 December 1964, to succeed Hermann Ehren.)	CDU
North Rhine-Westphalia	List		Ulrich Berger (Note: Ulrich Berger took office on 22 December 1964, to succeed Matthias Hoogen.)	CDU
North Rhine-Westphalia	List		Josef Rösing (Note: Josef Rösing took office on 30 June 1965, to succeed Friedrich Wilhelm Willeke.)	CDU
North Rhine-Westphalia	List		Luise Albertz	SPD
North Rhine-Westphalia	List		Günter Biermann	SPD
North Rhine-Westphalia	List		Julius Brecht (Note: Julius Brecht died on 10 July 1962.)	SPD
North Rhine-Westphalia	List		Wilhelm Dopatka	SPD
North Rhine-Westphalia	List		Elfriede Eilers	SPD
North Rhine-Westphalia	List		Fritz Eschmann	SPD
North Rhine-Westphalia	List		Heinrich Hamacher	SPD
North Rhine-Westphalia	List		Johann Karl Heide	SPD
North Rhine-Westphalia	List		Rudolf-Ernst Heiland (Note: Rudolf-Ernst Heiland died on 6 May 1965.)	SPD
North Rhine-Westphalia	List		Josef Hellenbrock	SPD
North Rhine-Westphalia	List		Josef Hufnagel	SPD
North Rhine-Westphalia	List		Hans Iven	SPD
North Rhine-Westphalia	List		Werner Jacobi	SPD
North Rhine-Westphalia	List		Wenzel Jaksch	SPD
North Rhine-Westphalia	List		Alma Kettig	SPD
North Rhine-Westphalia	List		Arthur Killat (Note: Arthur Killat took office on 19 March 1959, to succeed Fritz Heinrich.)	SPD
North Rhine-Westphalia	List		Liesel Kipp-Kaule	SPD
North Rhine-Westphalia	List		Jakob Koenen	SPD
North Rhine-Westphalia	List		Willy Könen	SPD
North Rhine-Westphalia	List		Friedrich Kraus	SPD
North Rhine-Westphalia	List		Heinz Kühn (Note: Heinz Kühn resigned on 9 April 1963.)	SPD
North Rhine-Westphalia	List		Hubert Lemper	SPD
North Rhine-Westphalia	List		Ulrich Lohmar	SPD
North Rhine-Westphalia	List		Karl-Heinz Lünenstraß (Note: Karl-Heinz Lünenstraß died on 16 May 1963.)	SPD
North Rhine-Westphalia	List		Walter Menzel (Note: Walter Menzel died on 24 September 1963.)	SPD
North Rhine-Westphalia	List		Peter Nellen	SPD
North Rhine-Westphalia	List		Heinz Pöhler	SPD
North Rhine-Westphalia	List		Margarete Rudoll	SPD
North Rhine-Westphalia	List		Karl-Heinz Saxowski	SPD
North Rhine-Westphalia	List		Josef Scheuren	SPD
North Rhine-Westphalia	List		Heinz Wegener	SPD
North Rhine-Westphalia	List		Helene Wessel	SPD
North Rhine-Westphalia	List		Karl Wienand	SPD
North Rhine-Westphalia	List		Hans-Jürgen Wischnewski	SPD
North Rhine-Westphalia	List		Else Zimmermann	SPD
North Rhine-Westphalia	List		August Bruse (Note: August Bruse took office on 16 July 1962, to succeed Julius Brecht.)	SPD
North Rhine-Westphalia	List		Artur Anders (Note: Artur Anders took office on 17 April 1963, to succeed Heinz Kühn.)	SPD
North Rhine-Westphalia	List		Wilhelm Maibaum (Note: Wilhelm Maibaum took office on 22 May 1963, to succeed Karl-Heinz Lünenstraß.)	SPD
North Rhine-Westphalia	List		Hans-Jürgen Pohlenz (Note: Hans-Jürgen Pohlenz took office on 30 September 1963, to succeed Walter Menzel, but later resigned on 10 June 1965.)	SPD
North Rhine-Westphalia	List		Hermann Herberts (Note: Hermann Herberts took office on 12 March 1964, to succeed Heinrich Deist.)	SPD
North Rhine-Westphalia	List		Klaus Hübner (Note: Klaus Hübner took office on 13 May 1965, to succeed Rudolf-Ernst Heiland.)	SPD
North Rhine-Westphalia	List		Wilhelm Ohlemeyer (Note: Wilhelm Ohlemeyer took office on 14 June 1965, to succeed Hans-Jürgen Pohlenz.)	SPD
North Rhine-Westphalia	List		Ernst Achenbach	FDP
North Rhine-Westphalia	List		Albrecht Aschoff	FDP
North Rhine-Westphalia	List		Richard Burckardt	FDP
North Rhine-Westphalia	List		Hermann Busse	FDP
North Rhine-Westphalia	List		Wolfgang Döring	FDP
North Rhine-Westphalia	List		Wolfram Dorn	FDP
North Rhine-Westphalia	List		Josef Effertz	FDP
North Rhine-Westphalia	List		Hans Georg Emde	FDP
North Rhine-Westphalia	List		Liselotte Funcke	FDP
North Rhine-Westphalia	List		Viktor Hoven	FDP
North Rhine-Westphalia	List		Ernst Keller (Note: Ernst Keller died on 21 July 1963.)	FDP
North Rhine-Westphalia	List		Walther Kühn (Note: Walther Kühn died on 4 December 1962.)	FDP
North Rhine-Westphalia	List		Erich Mende	FDP
North Rhine-Westphalia	List		Alfred Ollesch	FDP
North Rhine-Westphalia	List		Rudolf Opitz	FDP
North Rhine-Westphalia	List		Egon Wilhelm Ramms	FDP
North Rhine-Westphalia	List		Walter Rieger	FDP
North Rhine-Westphalia	List		Walter Scheel	FDP
North Rhine-Westphalia	List		Siegfried Zoglmann	FDP
North Rhine-Westphalia	List		Hedda Heuser (Note: Hedda Heuser took office on 6 December 1962, to succeed Walther Kühn.)	FDP
North Rhine-Westphalia	List		Ewald Krümmer (Note: Ewald Krümmer took office on 24 January 1963, to succeed Wolfgang Döring.)	FDP
North Rhine-Westphalia	List		Volrad Deneke (Note: Volrad Deneke took office on 26 July 1963, to succeed Ernst Keller.)	FDP
Hesse	126	Waldeck	Karl Bechert	SPD
Hesse	127	Kassel	Holger Börner	SPD
Hesse	128	Eschwege	Egon Höhmann	SPD
Hesse	129	Fritzlar-Homberg	Harri Bading	SPD
Hesse	130	Hersfeld	Ernst Meyer	SPD
Hesse	131	Marburg	Gerhard Jahn	SPD
Hesse	132	Wetzlar	Wilhelm Reitz	SPD
Hesse	133	Gießen	Hans Merten	SPD
Hesse	134	Fulda	Hermann Götz	CDU
Hesse	135	Obertaunuskreis	Kurt Gscheidle	SPD
Hesse	136	Friedberg	Lucie Beyer	SPD
Hesse	137	Limburg	Josef Arndgen	CDU
Hesse	138	Wiesbaden	Karl Wittrock (Note: Karl Wittrock resigned on 8 May 1963.)	SPD
Hesse	139	Hanau	Jakob Altmaier (Note: Jakob Altmaier died on 8 February 1963.)	SPD
Hesse	140	Frankfurt/M I	Georg Leber	SPD
Hesse	141	Frankfurt/M II	Willi Birkelbach (Note: Willi Birkelbach resigned on 30 September 1964.)	SPD
Hesse	142	Frankfurt/M III	Hans Matthöfer	SPD
Hesse	143	Groß-Gerau	Hermann Schmitt-Vockenhausen	SPD
Hesse	144	Offenbach/M	Horst Schmidt	SPD
Hesse	145	Darmstadt	Ludwig Metzger	SPD
Hesse	146	Dieburg	Heinrich Georg Ritzel	SPD
Hesse	147	Bergstraße	Heinrich von Brentano (Note: Heinrich von Brentano died on 14 November 1964.)	CDU
Hesse	List		Franz Böhm	CDU
Hesse	List		Wilhelm Gontrum	CDU
Hesse	List		Lothar Haase	CDU
Hesse	List		Peter Horn	CDU
Hesse	List		Karl Kanka	CDU
Hesse	List		Walter Löhr	CDU
Hesse	List		Berthold Martin	CDU
Hesse	List		Erich Peter Neumann	CDU
Hesse	List		Elisabeth Pitz-Savelsberg	CDU
Hesse	List		Carl Reinhard	CDU
Hesse	List		Clemens Riedel	CDU
Hesse	List		Elisabeth Schwarzhaupt	CDU
Hesse	List		Hans Wilhelmi	CDU
Hesse	List		Kurt Wittmer-Eigenbrodt	CDU
Hesse	List		Ludwig Preiß (Note: Ludwig Preiß took office on 24 November 1964, to succeed Heinrich von Brentano.)	CDU
Hesse	List		Wolfram Dörinkel	FDP
Hesse	List		Walter Hammersen	FDP
Hesse	List		Oswald Adolph Kohut	FDP
Hesse	List		Knut von Kühlmann-Stumm	FDP
Hesse	List		Alexander Menne	FDP
Hesse	List		Wolfgang Mischnick	FDP
Hesse	List		Fritz Walter	FDP
Hesse	List		Wolfgang Schwabe	SPD
Hesse	List		Georg August Zinn (Note: Georg August Zinn resigned on 13 December 1961.)	SPD
Hesse	List		Brigitte Freyh (Note: Brigitte Freyh took office on 22 December 1961, to succeed Georg August Zinn.)	SPD
Hesse	List		Gerhard Flämig (Note: Gerhard Flämig took office on 15 February 1963, to succeed Jakob Altmaier.)	SPD
Hesse	List		Willi Bäuerle (Note: Willi Bäuerle took office on 31 May 1963, to succeed Karl Wittrock.)	SPD
Hesse	List		Ladislaus Winterstein (Note: Ladislaus Winterstein took office on 26 October 1964, to succeed Willi Birkelbach, but later died on 2 November 1964.)	SPD
Hesse	List		Ingeborg Kleinert (Note: Ingeborg Kleinert took office on 13 November 1964, to succeed Ladislaus Winterstein.)	SPD
Rhineland-Palatinate	148	Altenkirchen (Westerwald)	Franz-Josef Wuermeling	CDU
Rhineland-Palatinate	149	Ahrweiler	Johann Peter Josten	CDU
Rhineland-Palatinate	150	Koblenz	Karl Weber	CDU
Rhineland-Palatinate	151	Cochem	Paul Gibbert	CDU
Rhineland-Palatinate	152	Kreuznach	Wilhelm Dröscher	SPD
Rhineland-Palatinate	153	Prüm	Hans Richarts	CDU
Rhineland-Palatinate	154	Trier	Alois Zimmer	CDU
Rhineland-Palatinate	155	Westerburg	Robert Stauch	CDU
Rhineland-Palatinate	156	Mainz	Josef Schlick	CDU
Rhineland-Palatinate	157	Worms	Willy Müller	SPD
Rhineland-Palatinate	158	Ludwigshafen am Rhein	Friedrich Wilhelm Wagner (Note: Friedrich Wilhelm Wagner resigned on 19 December 1961.)	SPD
Rhineland-Palatinate	159	Neustadt an der Weinstraße	Max Seither	SPD
Rhineland-Palatinate	160	Kaiserslautern	Adolf Müller-Emmert	SPD
Rhineland-Palatinate	161	Zweibrücken	Josef Becker	CDU
Rhineland-Palatinate	162	Speyer	Albert Leicht	CDU
Rhineland-Palatinate	List		Jakob Franzen (Note: Jakob Franzen resigned on 8 October 1965.)	CDU
Rhineland-Palatinate	List		Gerhard Fritz (Note: Gerhard Fritz resigned on 5 January 1965.)	CDU
Rhineland-Palatinate	List		Heinrich Holkenbrink	CDU
Rhineland-Palatinate	List		Marie-Elisabeth Klee	CDU
Rhineland-Palatinate	List		Ludwig Knobloch	CDU
Rhineland-Palatinate	List		Adolf Süsterhenn	CDU
Rhineland-Palatinate	List		Annemarie Ackermann (Note: Annemarie Ackermann took office on 16 January 1965, to succeed Gerhard Fritz.)	CDU
Rhineland-Palatinate	List		Curt Biegler	SPD
Rhineland-Palatinate	List		Werner Buchstaller	SPD
Rhineland-Palatinate	List		Luise Herklotz	SPD
Rhineland-Palatinate	List		Peter Jacobs	SPD
Rhineland-Palatinate	List		Rudolf Kaffka	SPD
Rhineland-Palatinate	List		Elfriede Seppi	SPD
Rhineland-Palatinate	List		Adolf Ludwig (Note: Adolf Ludwig took office on 6 January 1962, to succeed Friedrich Wilhelm Wagner, but later died on 18 February 1962.)	SPD
Rhineland-Palatinate	List		Willi Peiter (Note: Willi Peiter took office on 22 February 1962, to succeed Adolf Ludwig.)	SPD
Rhineland-Palatinate	List		Karl Atzenroth	FDP
Rhineland-Palatinate	List		Werner Danz	FDP
Rhineland-Palatinate	List		Ludwig Hamm	FDP
Rhineland-Palatinate	List		Fritz-Rudolf Schultz	FDP
Baden-Württemberg	163	Stuttgart I	Clara Döhring	SPD
Baden-Württemberg	164	Stuttgart II	Erwin Schoettle	SPD
Baden-Württemberg	165	Ludwigsburg	Karl Mommer	SPD
Baden-Württemberg	166	Heilbronn	Helmut Bazille	SPD
Baden-Württemberg	167	Böblingen	Paul Bausch	CDU
Baden-Württemberg	168	Eßlingen	Thomas Ruf	CDU
Baden-Württemberg	169	Göppingen	Hermann Finckh (Note: Hermann Finckh died on 28 April 1962.)	CDU
Baden-Württemberg	170	Ulm	Ludwig Erhard	CDU
Baden-Württemberg	171	Aalen	Rudolf Vogel (Note: Rudolf Vogel resigned on 15 April 1964.)	CDU
Baden-Württemberg	172	Backnang	Eugen Gerstenmaier	CDU
Baden-Württemberg	173	Crailsheim	Heinrich Stooß	CDU
Baden-Württemberg	174	Waiblingen	Carl Roesch	SPD
Baden-Württemberg	175	Karlsruhe-Stadt	Max Güde	CDU
Baden-Württemberg	176	Mannheim-Stadt	Carlo Schmid	SPD
Baden-Württemberg	177	Heidelberg	Eduard Wahl	CDU
Baden-Württemberg	178	Karlsruhe-Land	Gottfried Leonhard	CDU
Baden-Württemberg	179	Bruchsal	Adolf Bieringer	CDU
Baden-Württemberg	180	Mannheim-Land	Helmut Artzinger	CDU
Baden-Württemberg	181	Sinsheim	Fritz Baier	CDU
Baden-Württemberg	182	Tauberbischofsheim	August Berberich	CDU
Baden-Württemberg	183	Konstanz	Hermann Biechele	CDU
Baden-Württemberg	184	Donaueschingen	Anton Hilbert	CDU
Baden-Württemberg	185	Lörrach	Karl August Bühler	CDU
Baden-Württemberg	186	Freiburg	Hermann Kopf	CDU
Baden-Württemberg	187	Emmendingen	Heinrich Höfler (Note: Heinrich Höfler died on 21 October 1963.)	CDU
Baden-Württemberg	188	Offenburg	Hans Furler	CDU
Baden-Württemberg	189	Rastatt	Hugo Hauser	CDU
Baden-Württemberg	190	Reutlingen	Gustav-Adolf Gedat	CDU
Baden-Württemberg	191	Calw	Arved Deringer	CDU
Baden-Württemberg	192	Rottweil	Bruno Heck	CDU
Baden-Württemberg	193	Balingen	Walter Gaßmann	CDU
Baden-Württemberg	194	Biberach	Bernhard Bauknecht	CDU
Baden-Württemberg	195	Ravensburg	Eduard Adorno	CDU
Baden-Württemberg	List		Fritz Corterier	SPD
Baden-Württemberg	List		Erhard Eppler	SPD
Baden-Württemberg	List		Fritz Erler	SPD
Baden-Württemberg	List		Walter Faller	SPD
Baden-Württemberg	List		Hans Geiger	SPD
Baden-Württemberg	List		Hans Hörmann	SPD
Baden-Württemberg	List		Paul Kübler	SPD
Baden-Württemberg	List		Oskar Matzner	SPD
Baden-Württemberg	List		Hedwig Meermann	SPD
Baden-Württemberg	List		Alex Möller	SPD
Baden-Württemberg	List		Karl Müller	SPD
Baden-Württemberg	List		Ernst Paul	SPD
Baden-Württemberg	List		Karl Riegel	SPD
Baden-Württemberg	List		Fritz Rinderspacher	SPD
Baden-Württemberg	List		Friedrich Schäfer	SPD
Baden-Württemberg	List		Marta Schanzenbach	SPD
Baden-Württemberg	List		Ewald Bucher	FDP
Baden-Württemberg	List		Emmy Diemer-Nicolaus	FDP
Baden-Württemberg	List		Hermann Dürr	FDP
Baden-Württemberg	List		Hans Lenz	FDP
Baden-Württemberg	List		Robert Margulies (Note: Robert Margulies resigned on 27 August 1964.)	FDP
Baden-Württemberg	List		Adolf Mauk	FDP
Baden-Württemberg	List		Werner Mertes	FDP
Baden-Württemberg	List		Klaus Freiherr von Mühlen	FDP
Baden-Württemberg	List		Martin Reichmann	FDP
Baden-Württemberg	List		Wolfgang Rutschke	FDP
Baden-Württemberg	List		Kurt Spitzmüller	FDP
Baden-Württemberg	List		Fritz Weber	FDP
Baden-Württemberg	List		Karl Moersch (Note: Karl Moersch took office on 1 September 1964, to succeed Robert Margulies.)	FDP
Baden-Württemberg	List		Hildegard Bleyler	CDU
Baden-Württemberg	List		Herbert Czaja	CDU
Baden-Württemberg	List		Josef Maier	CDU
Baden-Württemberg	List		Eugen Maucher	CDU
Baden-Württemberg	List		Hermann Schwörer	CDU
Baden-Württemberg	List		Wilhelm Hahn (Note: Wilhelm Hahn took office on 9 May 1962, to succeed Hermann Finckh, but later resigned on 16 November 1964.)	CDU
Baden-Württemberg	List		Kurt Härzschel (Note: Kurt Härzschel took office on 28 October 1963, to succeed Heinrich Höfler.)	CDU
Baden-Württemberg	List		Erwin Häussler (Note: Erwin Häussler took office on 20 April 1964, to succeed Rudolf Vogel.)	CDU
Baden-Württemberg	List		Annemarie Griesinger (Note: Annemarie Griesinger took office on 23 November 1964, to succeed Wilhelm Hahn.)	CDU
Bavaria	196	Altötting	Josef Bauer	CSU
Bavaria	197	Fürstenfeldbruck	Richard Jaeger	CSU
Bavaria	198	Ingolstadt	Paul Weinzierl	CSU
Bavaria	199	Miesbach	Franz Gleissner	CSU
Bavaria	200	Munich North	Siegfried Balke	CSU
Bavaria	201	Munich East	Franz Marx	SPD
Bavaria	202	Munich South	Karl Wieninger	CSU
Bavaria	203	Munich West	Anton Besold	CSU
Bavaria	204	Munich Land	Franz Seidl	CSU
Bavaria	205	Rosenheim	Ludwig Franz	CSU
Bavaria	206	Traunstein	Heinz Brenck	CSU
Bavaria	207	Weilheim	Franz Josef Strauss	CSU
Bavaria	208	Deggendorf	Stefan Dittrich	CSU
Bavaria	209	Landshut	Friedrich Zimmermann	CSU
Bavaria	210	Passau	August Ramminger	CSU
Bavaria	211	Pfarrkirchen	Friedrich Kempfler	CSU
Bavaria	212	Straubing	Josef Lermer (Note: Josef Lermer died on 15 July 1964.)	CSU
Bavaria	213	Vilshofen	Franz Xaver Unertl	CSU
Bavaria	214	Amberg	Heinrich Aigner	CSU
Bavaria	215	Burglengenfeld	Hans Drachsler	CSU
Bavaria	216	Cham	Alois Niederalt	CSU
Bavaria	217	Regensburg	Hermann Höcherl	CSU
Bavaria	218	Tirschenreuth	Franz Weigl	CSU
Bavaria	219	Bamberg	Emil Kemmer (Note: Emil Kemmer resigned on 7 October 1964.)	CSU
Bavaria	220	Bayreuth	Herbert Hauffe	SPD
Bavaria	221	Coburg	Friedrich Knorr	CSU
Bavaria	222	Forchheim	Karl Theodor Freiherr von und zu Guttenberg	CSU
Bavaria	223	Hof	Martin Hirsch	SPD
Bavaria	224	Kulmbach	Gustav Sühler	CSU
Bavaria	225	Ansbach	Georg Ehnes	CSU
Bavaria	226	Erlangen	Werner Dollinger	CSU
Bavaria	227	Nuremberg	Käte Strobel	SPD
Bavaria	228	Nuremberg-Fürth	Max Seidel	SPD
Bavaria	229	Schwabach	Georg Baron Manteuffel-Szoege (Note: Georg Baron Manteuffel-Szoege died 8 June 1962.)	CSU
Bavaria	230	Weißenburg	Richard Stücklen	CSU
Bavaria	231	Aschaffenburg	Karl-Heinz Vogt	CSU
Bavaria	232	Bad Kissingen	Alex Hösl	CSU
Bavaria	233	Karlstadt	Maria Probst	CSU
Bavaria	234	Schweinfurt	Friedrich Funk (Note: Friedrich Funk died on 5 August 1963.)	CSU
Bavaria	235	Würzburg	Linus Memmel	CSU
Bavaria	236	Augsburg-Stadt	Otto Weinkamm	CSU
Bavaria	237	Augsburg-Land	Walter Althammer	CSU
Bavaria	238	Dillingen	Hans Schütz (Note: Hans Schütz resigned on 5 February 1963.)	CSU
Bavaria	239	Donauwörth	Philipp Meyer (Note: Philipp Meyer died on 29 January 1962.)	CSU
Bavaria	240	Kaufbeuren	Josef Spies	CSU
Bavaria	241	Kempten	Georg Krug	CSU
Bavaria	242	Memmingen	Hans August Lücker	CSU
Bavaria	List		Hans Bals	SPD
Bavaria	List		Hannsheinz Bauer	SPD
Bavaria	List		Josef Felder	SPD
Bavaria	List		Erwin Folger	SPD
Bavaria	List		Walter Fritsch	SPD
Bavaria	List		Hermann Haage	SPD
Bavaria	List		Karl Herold	SPD
Bavaria	List		Wilhelm Hoegner (Note: Wilhelm Hoegner resigned on 4 January 1962.)	SPD
Bavaria	List		Franz Höhne	SPD
Bavaria	List		Fritz Wilhelm Hörauf	SPD
Bavaria	List		Richard Kohlberger	SPD
Bavaria	List		Gerhard Kreyssig	SPD
Bavaria	List		Georg Kurlbaum	SPD
Bavaria	List		Walter Langebeck	SPD
Bavaria	List		Hans Lautenschlager	SPD
Bavaria	List		Rudolf Metter	SPD
Bavaria	List		Hans Müller	SPD
Bavaria	List		Gerhard Reischl	SPD
Bavaria	List		Richard Reitzner (Note: Richard Reitzner died on 11 May 1962.)	SPD
Bavaria	List		Philipp Seibert	SPD
Bavaria	List		Walter Seuffert	SPD
Bavaria	List		Alois Strohmayr	SPD
Bavaria	List		Ernst Zühlke	SPD
Bavaria	List		Georg Kahn-Ackermann (Note: Georg Kahn-Ackermann took office on 10 January 1962, to succeed Wilhelm Hoegner.)	SPD
Bavaria	List		Konrad Porzner (Note: Konrad Porzner took office on 21 May 1962, to succeed Richard Reitzner.)	SPD
Bavaria	List		Ingeborg Geisendörfer	CSU
Bavaria	List		Fritz von Haniel-Niethammer	CSU
Bavaria	List		Edeltraud Kuchtner	CSU
Bavaria	List		Georg Lang (Note: Georg Lang died on 1 June 1965.)	CSU
Bavaria	List		Karl Heinz Lemmrich	CSU
Bavaria	List		Georg Stiller	CSU
Bavaria	List		Gerhard Wacher (Note: Gerhard Wacher resigned on 26 May 1963.)	CSU
Bavaria	List		Leo Wagner	CSU
Bavaria	List		Friedrich Winter (Note: Friedrich Winter took office on 2 February 1962, to succeed Philipp Meyer.)	CSU
Bavaria	List		Edmund Leukert (Note: Edmund Leukert took office on 27 June 1962, to succeed Georg Baron Manteuffel-Szoege.)	CSU
Bavaria	List		Albrecht Schlee (Note: Albrecht Schlee took office on 15 February 1963, to succeed Hans Schütz.)	CSU
Bavaria	List		Erich Ziegler (Note: Erich Ziegler took office on 1 April 1963, to succeed Gerhard Wacher.)	CSU
Bavaria	List		Centa Haas (Note: Centa Haas took office on 9 August 1963, to succeed Friedrich Funk.)	CSU
Bavaria	List		Walter Eckhardt (Note: Walter Eckhardt took office on 21 July 1964, to succeed Josef Lermer.)	CSU
Bavaria	List		Franz Wittmann (Note: Franz Wittmann took office on 26 October 1964, to succeed Emil Kemmer.)	CSU
Bavaria	List		Helmut Geiger (Note: Helmut Geiger took office on 8 June 1965, to succeed Georg Lang.)	CSU
Bavaria	List		Thomas Dehler	FDP
Bavaria	List		Josef Ertl	FDP
Bavaria	List		Werner Kubitza	FDP
Bavaria	List		Leonhard Murr	FDP
Bavaria	List		Hansheinrich Schmidt	FDP
Bavaria	List		Wolfgang Stammberger	FDP
Bavaria	List		Heinz Starke	FDP
Bavaria	List		Ernst Supf	FDP
Saarland	243	Saarbrücken-Stadt	Eugen Huthmacher (Note: Eugen Huthmacher resigned on 13 February 1962.)	CDU
Saarland	244	Saarbrücken-Land	Heinrich Draeger	CDU
Saarland	245	Saarlouis – Merzig	Albert Baldauf	CDU
Saarland	246	Ottweiler – St. Wendel	Leo Gottesleben	CDU
Saarland	247	Homburg – St. Ingbert	Johann Klein	CDU
Saarland	List		Rudolf Hussong	SPD
Saarland	List		Alwin Kulawig	SPD
Saarland	List		Werner Wilhelm	SPD
Saarland	List		Heinrich Schneider	FDP
West Berlin			Adolf Arndt	SPD
West Berlin			Margarete Berger-Heise	SPD
West Berlin			Willy Brandt (Note: Willy Brandt resigned on 27 December 1961.)	SPD
West Berlin			Josef Braun	SPD
West Berlin			Günter Klein (Note: Günter Klein died on 22 October 1963.)	SPD
West Berlin			Edith Krappe	SPD
West Berlin			Kurt Mattick	SPD
West Berlin			Kurt Neubauer (Note: Kurt Neubauer resigned on 16 April 1963.)	SPD
West Berlin			Franz Neumann	SPD
West Berlin			Ernst Schellenberg	SPD
West Berlin			Klaus Schütz (Note: Klaus Schütz resigned on 9 January 1962.)	SPD
West Berlin			Franz Seume	SPD
West Berlin			Wilhelm Urban	SPD
West Berlin			Hans Wellmann (Note: Hans Wellmann took office on 1 January 1962, to succeed Willy Brandt.)	SPD
West Berlin			Harry Liehr (Note: Harry Liehr took office on 11 January 1962, to succeed Klaus Schütz.)	SPD
West Berlin			Dora Lösche (Note: Dora Lösche took office on 18 April 1963, to succeed Kurt Neubauer.)	SPD
West Berlin			Willy Bartsch (Note: Willy Bartsch took office on 23 October 1963, to succeed Günter Klein.)	SPD
West Berlin			Ernst Benda	CDU
West Berlin			Ferdinand Friedensburg	CDU
West Berlin			Johann Baptist Gradl	CDU
West Berlin			Karl Hübner	CDU
West Berlin			Heinrich Krone	CDU
West Berlin			Ernst Lemmer	CDU
West Berlin			Agnes Katharina Maxsein	CDU
West Berlin			Johannes Müller	CDU
West Berlin			Josef Stingl	CDU

== See also ==
- Politics of Germany
- List of Bundestag Members
