= Ingo Vogel =

German politician (born 1976)

Member of the Bundestag
- Assuming office 25 March 2025
- Succeeding: Dirk Heidenblut
- Constituency: Essen II

Personal details
- Born: 29 April 1976 (age 50)
- Party: Social Democratic Party

Ingo Vogel (born 29 April 1976) is a German politician who was elected as a member of the Bundestag in 2025. He is the chairman of the Social Democratic Party in the city council of Essen.
