= Aschoff =

Aschoff is a German surname. Notable people with the surname include:

- Albrecht Aschoff (1899–1972), German politician
- Edward Aschoff (1985–2019), American sports journalist
- Eva Aschoff (1900–1969), German artist
- Jürgen Aschoff (1913–1998), German physician, biologist and behavioral psychologist
- Ludwig Aschoff (1866–1942), German physician and pathologist

== See also ==
- Hermann Höpker-Aschoff (1883–1954), German politician
