= Hermann Ehren =

German politician (1894–1964)

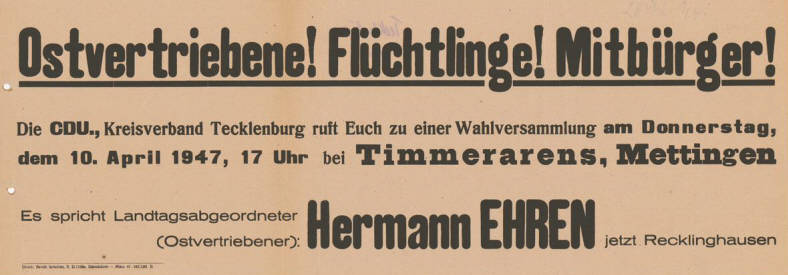
- Announcement poster of the CDU Tecklenburg for an election meeting with Hermann Ehrens on the occasion of the Landtag election in North Rhine-Westphalia 1947

Member of the Bundestag
- In office 7 September 1949 – 15 October 1961
- In office 4 October 1962 – 30 November 1964

Personal details
- Born: 17 October 1894 Essen, Kingdom of Prussia, German Empire
- Died: 30 November 1964 (aged 70) Bottrop, North Rhine-Westphalia, West Germany
- Party: CDU
- Other political affiliations: Centre Party

Hermann Ehren (October 17, 1894 – November 30, 1964) was a German politician of the Centre Party and the Christian Democratic Union (CDU), and a member of the German Bundestag.

== Life ==
After completing Volksschule, Ehren attended a vocational school in Essen and completed a trade apprenticeship, which he finished with the journeyman's examination. From 1920, he worked as a youth secretary for the Christian Miners' Union and as editor of the magazine Knappenjugend (Miners' Youth). In 1924, he became general secretary of the Catholic Men's Association movement for Upper Silesia in Gleiwitz (today, Gliwice). Before 1933, Ehren was a member of the Centre Party, a city councilor in Gleiwitz, and a member of the provincial parliament of Upper Silesia. After 1933, he worked for the industrialist Nikolaus von Ballestrem.

After the end of the Second World War in 1945, Ehren was expelled from Silesia after it was ceded to Poland. He joined the Christian Democratic Union (CDU) and, in 1946, became chairman of the refugee committee for Westphalia. Ehren was appointed to the second Landtag (state parliament) of North Rhine-Westphalia in 1946–47 and was a member of the zone advisory council of the British occupation zone in 1947–48.

In the 1949 Bundestag elections, Ehren ran for election in the Meschede-Olpe constituency, won and entered the Bundestag, where he remained until 1961, having been reelected in 1953 and 1957 via the state list. On October 4, 1962, he succeeded the deceased Robert Pferdmenges and again served as a member of parliament until his death in 1964.

== Sources ==
- Herbst, Ludolf; Jahn, Bruno (2002). Vierhaus, Rudolf (ed.). Biographisches Handbuch der Mitglieder des Deutschen Bundestages. 1949–2002 [Biographical Handbook of the Members of the German Bundestag. 1949–2002] (in German). München: De Gruyter - De Gruyter Saur. p. 1715. ISBN 978-3-11-184511-1.
- Hermann Ehren biography in the M.d.B. Die Volksvertretung 1946–1972.
