= List of minister-presidents of Anhalt =

This article lists the ministers of state (German: Staatsminister) in the Duchy of Anhalt from 1863 to 1918 and minister-presidents (German: Ministerpräsidenten) of the Free State of Anhalt from 1918 to 1945.

== Ministers of state of the Duchy of Anhalt ==
- 1863–1868: Carl Friedrich Ferdinand Sintenis
- 1868–1875: Karl August Alfred von Larisch
- 1875–1892: Anton von Krosigk
- 1892–1902: Kurt von Koseritz
- 1903–1909: Nikolaus Michael Louis Hans von Dallwitz
- 1910–1918: Ernst Laue
- 1918: Max Gutknecht

== Minister-presidents of the Free State of Anhalt ==
Political party: SPD DNVP NSDAP None

Portrait	Name (Birth–Death)	Term of office			Political party
Portrait	Name (Birth–Death)	Took office	Left office	Days	Political party
	Max Gutknecht (1876–1935)	8 November 1918	14 November 1918	6	Non-partisan
	Wolfgang Heine (1861–1944)	14 November 1918	23 July 1919	251	Social Democratic Party of Germany
	Heinrich Deist (1874–1962); 1st term	23 July 1919	9 July 1924	1813	Social Democratic Party of Germany
	R. Willi Knorr (1878–1937)	9 July 1924	25 November 1924	139	German National People's Party
	Heinrich Deist (1874–1962); 2nd term	25 November 1924	21 May 1932	2734	Social Democratic Party of Germany
	Alfred Freyberg (1892–1945)	21 May 1932	8 January 1940	2788	National Socialist German Workers' Party
	Wilhelm Friedrich Loeper (1883–1935)	Reichsstatthalter		901	National Socialist German Workers' Party
	Wilhelm Friedrich Loeper (1883–1935)	5 May 1933	23 October 1935	901	National Socialist German Workers' Party
	Fritz Sauckel (1894–1946)	Acting Reichsstatthalter		567	National Socialist German Workers' Party
	Fritz Sauckel (1894–1946)	October 1935	20 April 1937	567	National Socialist German Workers' Party
	Rudolf Jordan (1902–1988)	Reichsstatthalter		2903	National Socialist German Workers' Party
	Rudolf Jordan (1902–1988)	20 April 1937	April 1945	2903	National Socialist German Workers' Party
	Rudolf Jordan (1902–1988)	Ministerpräsident		1910	National Socialist German Workers' Party
	Rudolf Jordan (1902–1988)	8 January 1940	April 1945	1910	National Socialist German Workers' Party

== See also ==
- List of minister-presidents of Saxony-Anhalt
