= Curt Becker (politician, born 1905) =

German politician (1905–1987)

Member of the Bundestag
- In office 15 October 1957 – 15 October 1961
- In office 11 June 1964 – 17 October 1965
- In office 20 October 1969 – 22 September 1972
- In office 13 December 1972 – 13 December 1976

Personal details
- Born: 7 August 1905 Mönchengladbach
- Died: 21 February 1987 (aged 81) Mönchengladbach, North Rhine-Westphalia, Germany
- Party: CDU

Curt Becker (August 7, 1905 – February 21, 1987) was a German politician of the Christian Democratic Union (CDU) and former member of the German Bundestag.

== Life ==
In 1945 he participated in the foundation of the Mönchengladbach CDU and became its deputy local chairman. He was a member of the CDU's state and federal expert committee for economic policy. From 1957 to 1961, from 11 June 1964 when he succeeded Luise Rehling, until 1965 and from 1969 to 1976 he was a member of the German Bundestag. He represented the constituency of Mönchengladbach in parliament.

== Literature ==
Herbst, Ludolf; Jahn, Bruno (2002). Vierhaus, Rudolf (ed.). Biographisches Handbuch der Mitglieder des Deutschen Bundestages. 1949–2002 [Biographical Handbook of the Members of the German Bundestag. 1949–2002] (in German). München: De Gruyter - De Gruyter Saur. p. 1715. ISBN 978-3-11-184511-1.
