= Helene Weber =

German politician and activist (1881–1962)

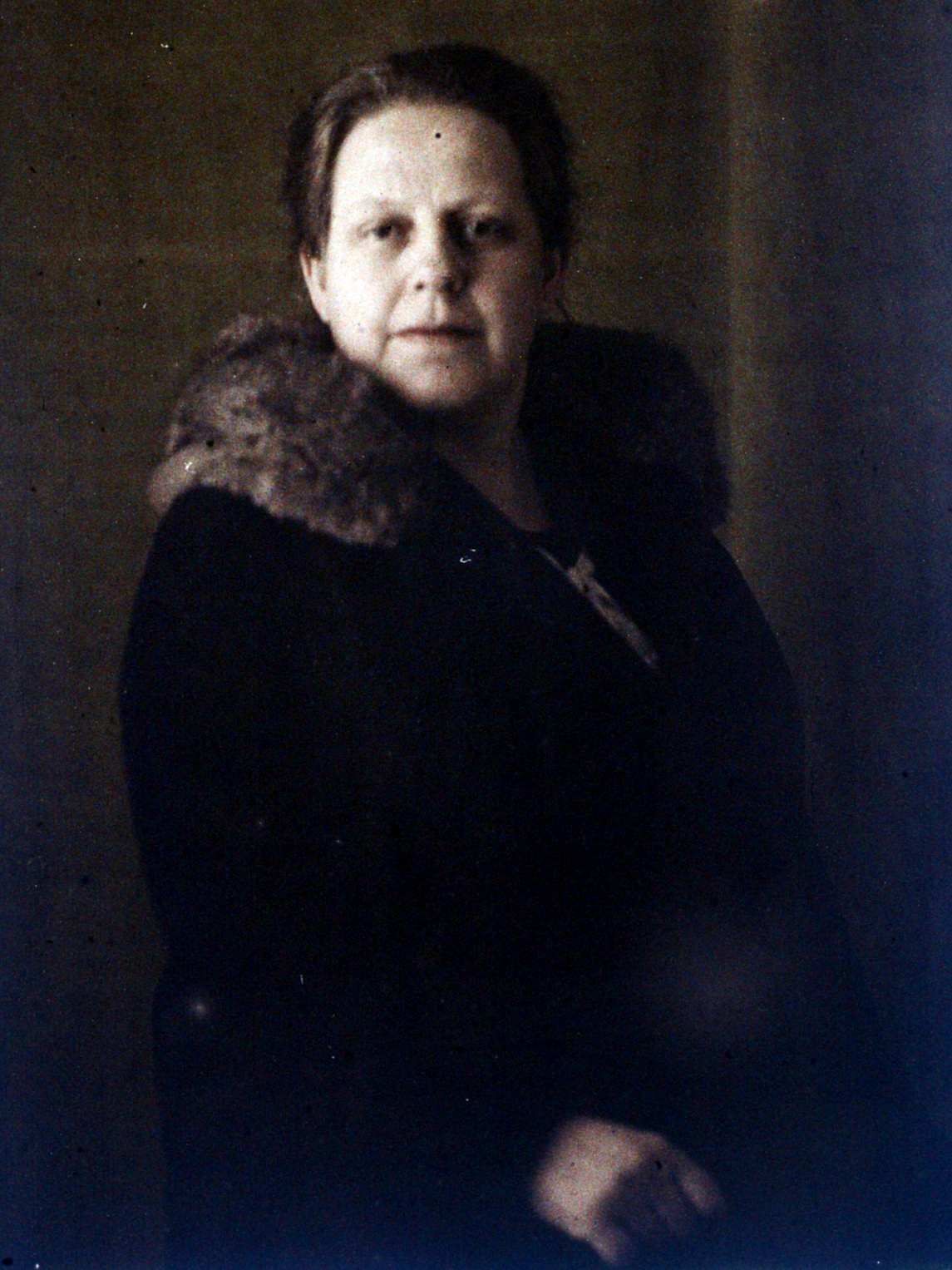
- 1931 Autochrome by Georges Chevalier

Member of the Bundestag; from North Rhine-Westphalia
- In office 7 September 1949 – 25 July 1962
- Preceded by: Constituency established
- Succeeded by: Margarete Engländer
- Constituency: Aachen-Stadt (1949–1957); State list (1957–1962)

Member of the Reichstag
- In office 4 May 1924 – 23 March 1933
- Constituency: National list (1924); Düsseldorf East (1924–1933)

Member of the Landtag of Prussia
- In office March 1921 – December 1924

Member of the Weimar National Assembly
- In office 6 February 1919 – 21 May 1920

Personal details
- Born: 17 March 1881 Wuppertal, German Empire
- Died: 25 July 1962 (aged 81) Bonn, North Rhine-Westphalia, West Germany
- Party: Christian Democratic Union
- Other political affiliations: DZP (before 1945)

Helene Weber (born 17 March 1881 in Elberfeld, now Wuppertal, Rhine Province, died 25 July 1962 in Bonn) was a German politician and was known as a women's rights activist. In the Weimar Republic she rose to prominence in the Catholic Centre Party. In 1945 she was among the founders of the Christian Democratic Union (CDU). In 1948 she was a co-founder of the CDU Women's Task Force, a precursor of the party's Women's Union, which she chaired from 1951 to 1958. Weber is one of four women who, alongside 61 men, drafted Germany's constitution, the Basic Law, in 1948-49. After initial hesitation, she closed ranks with the women delegates of the Social Democratic Party to successfully fight for the inclusion of the sentence "Men and women shall have equal rights" in Article 3 of the Basic Law. She is often cited for her anti-war statement: "The entirely male-run state is the ruin of nations" ("Der reine Männerstaat ist das Verderben der Völker").

== Biography ==
After graduating from the girls' middle school in Elberfeld, Helene Weber enrolled at the teacher training school in Aachen from 1897 to 1900. After several years teaching in Elberfeld, she matriculated at the University of Bonn and later at Grenoble to study history, philosophy and Romance languages. As a university student, she joined the sorority Hilaritas. She then returned to teaching at the girls' secondary school in Bochum and as of 1911 in Cologne.

She became a member of the Central Committee of the German Catholic Women's Association and first chair of the League of Catholic Social Civil Servants in Germany. From 1918, she was head of the Women's Social School at Aachen, which had originally been founded by the German Catholic Women's Association in Cologne and had grown to include a branch in Aachen, which in 1971 developed into the Katholische Hochschule Nordrhein-Westfalen. In 1920, she became a Ministerial Councillor in the Prussian Ministry of Welfare, where she founded the Social Education Division. She was the first female Ministerial Councillor in the state of Prussia.

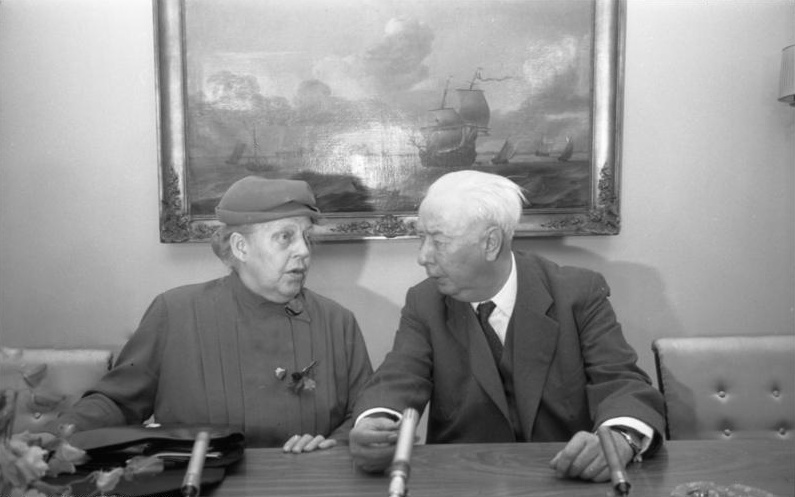
Helene Weber in 1959 speaking to President Theodor Heuss

As a member of the Weimar National Assembly in 1919–20, she was involved in the development of the Weimar Constitution. From 1921 to 1924, she was also a Landtag deputy in Prussia. From May 1924 to 1933 she belonged to the Reichstag, the federal German parliament. In March 1933, she joined the former Reich Chancellor Heinrich Brüning among the minority of Centre MPs who opposed Hitler's Enabling Act. Ultimately, however, she bent to pressure from the Reichstag Group and agreed to the law, which was a decisive step along the road to power for the Nazis. After the Nazi takeover, she was forced into early retirement on political grounds as of 30 June 1933 and subsequently worked in social welfare on a volunteer basis.

After the Second World War, she took over the chair of the National Association of Catholic Welfare in Rinnen, Germany, and became again vice-chairman of the Catholic Women's Federation. She was nominated for both parliaments of North Rhine-Westphalia. In 1947/48 she belonged to the area council for the British occupation zone. In 1948 she was elected in the Parliamentary Council to serve as one of four women involved in drafting the constitution of the Federal Republic of Germany project. She became member secretary of the Bureau.

From 1949 until her death she was a member of the German Bundestag representing the CDU. Her parliamentary constituency was Aachen City. In the fourth legislature Helene Weber was third oldest member of the Bundestag after Konrad Adenauer and Robert Pferdmenges.

She persistently urged German Chancellor Konrad Adenauer that at least one Ministry should be headed by a woman.

In 1950, she was also a member of the Consultative Assembly of the Council of Europe.

== Honours ==
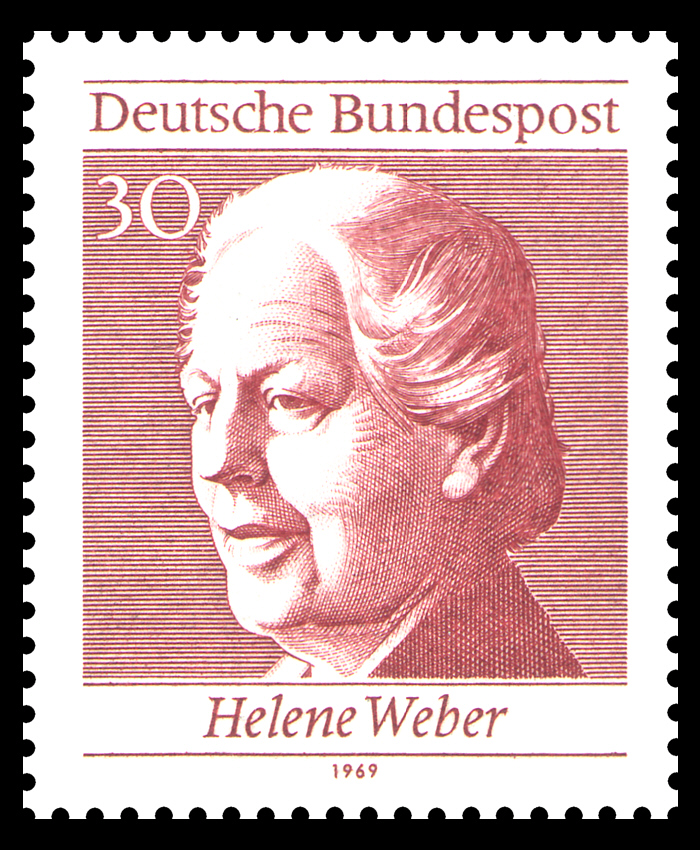
Helene Weber on a 1969 German stamp

Helene Weber was awarded with an honorary doctorate by the National Faculty of the University of Münster in 1930. In 1956, she was honored with the Great Federal Cross of Merit, and five years later was awarded with the sash as well.

The Helene Weber Berufskolleg in Paderborn, and the Catholic Family Educational Helene-Weber-Haus in Gelsenkirchen and Fulda, are both named after her.

== Publications ==
- Verständnis für die heutige Jugend (Understanding of today's youth), in: Bayerische Gemeinde- und Verwaltungszeitung, Jg. 1927, p 385.
- Der Beruf der Sozialbeamtin (The profession of social officer), in: Hermann Geib (Hrsg.), Jahrbuch für Sozialpolitik, Leipzig 1930, p 172-177.
