= Wolfgang Heine =

German jurist and social democratic politician

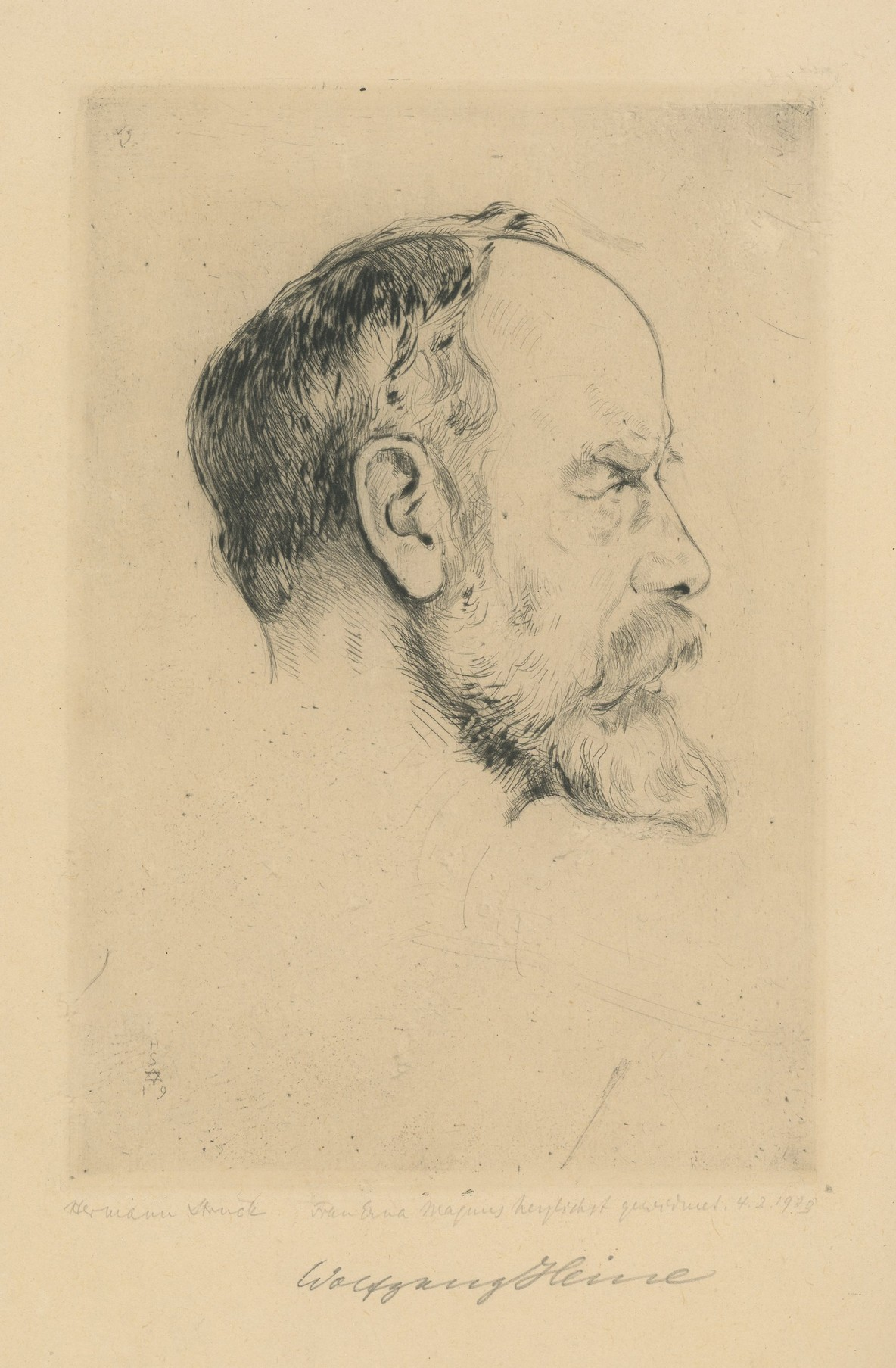
- Wolfgang Heine

Member of the Reichstag
- In office 1898–1920
- Constituency: Berlin 3 (1898-1912); Anhalt I (1912-1920)

Minister President of the Free State of Anhalt
- In office 14 November 1918 – July 1919

Prussian Minister of Justice
- In office 27 November 1918 – 25 March 1919 Serving with Kurt Rosenfeld

Prussian Minister of the Interior
- In office 25 March 1919 – March 1920

Member of the Weimar National Assembly
- In office 1919–1920

Member of the Constitutional Court
- In office 1923–1925

Personal details
- Born: 3 May 1861 Posen, Province of Posen, Prussia (Poznań, Poland)
- Died: 9 May 1944 (aged 83) Ascona, Switzerland
- Spouse(s): Cornelia Zeller; Emilie Vogel
- Occupation: Jurist, lawyer

Wolfgang Heine (3 May 1861 – 9 May 1944) was a German jurist and social democratic politician. Heine was a member of the Imperial parliament and the Weimar National Assembly, he served as Minister President of the Free State of Anhalt and Prussian Minister of the Interior and Justice.

== Biography ==
Heine was born in Posen, Province of Posen, Kingdom of Prussia (Poznań, Poland) to Otto Heine, a grammar school teacher at the Maria-Magdalena-Gymnasium in Breslau (Wrocław, Poland), and Meta née Bormann. He attended school in Weimar, Hirschberg (Jelenia Góra) and Breslau, and studied natural sciences and law at the Universities of Breslau, Tübingen and Berlin. He worked as a lawyer in Berlin and joined the SPD in 1884.

He was elected a member of the Reichstag in 1898, initially representing Berlin and from 1912 on representing the constituency of Anhalt. After World War I Heine became Minister President of the Free State of Anhalt, Prussian Minister of the Interior and Prussian Minister of Justice.

Heine was criticized for his attempt to negotiate during the Kapp Putsch of March 1920 and lost his position in the Prussian government. From 1923 to 1925 he was a judge at the German Constitutional Court (Staatsgerichtshof) and continued to work as a lawyer in Berlin.

At the beginning of the Nazi regime, Heine fled to Switzerland and died in Ascona.
