= Essen II =

Federal electoral district of Germany

118 Essen II
- Electoral district for the Bundestag
- Essen II in 2025
- State: North Rhine-Westphalia
- Population: 246,600 (2019)
- Electorate: 156,298 (2017)
- Major settlements: Essen (partial)
- Area: 67.7 km^{2}

Current electoral district
- Created: 1949
- Party: SPD
- Member: Ingo Vogel
- Elected: 2025

Essen II is an electoral constituency (German: Wahlkreis) represented in the Bundestag. It elects one member via first-past-the-post voting. Under the current constituency numbering system, it is designated as constituency 118. It is located in the Ruhr region of North Rhine-Westphalia, comprising the northeastern part of the city of Essen.

Essen II was created for the inaugural 1949 federal election. From 2013 to 2025, it was represented by Dirk Heidenblut of the Social Democratic Party (SPD). Since 2025 it has been represented by Ingo Vogel of the SPD.

== Geography ==
Essen II is located in the Ruhr region of North Rhine-Westphalia. As of the 2021 federal election, it comprises the Stadtbezirke I (Stadtmitte/Frillendorf), V (Altenessen/Karnap/Vogelheim), VI (Zollverein), and VII (Steele/Kray) from the independent city of Essen.

== History ==
Essen II was created in 1949. In the 1949 election, it was North Rhine-Westphalia constituency 31 in the numbering system. From 1953 through 1961, it was number 90. From 1965 through 1976, it was number 88. From 1980 through 1998, it was number 89. From 2002 through 2009, it was number 120. In the 2013 through 2021 elections, it was number 119. From the 2025 election, it has been number 118.

Originally, the constituency comprised the northeastern parts of the city of Essen. From 1980 through 1998, it comprised Stadtbezirke V (Altenessen/Karnap/Vogelheim), VI (Zollverein), and VII (Steele/Kray). It acquired its current borders in the 2002 election.

Election	No.	Name	Borders
1949	31	Essen II	Essen city (only northeastern parts)
1953	90	Essen II	Essen city (only northeastern parts)
1957	90	Essen II	Essen city (only northeastern parts)
1961	90	Essen II	Essen city (only northeastern parts)
1965	88	Essen II	Essen city (only northeastern parts)
1969	88	Essen II	Essen city (only northeastern parts)
1972	88	Essen II	Essen city (only northeastern parts)
1976	88	Essen II	Essen city (only northeastern parts)
1980	89	Essen II	Essen city (only V (Altenessen/Karnap/Vogelheim), VI (Zollverein), and VII (Steele/Kray) Stadtbezirke)
1983	89	Essen II	Essen city (only V (Altenessen/Karnap/Vogelheim), VI (Zollverein), and VII (Steele/Kray) Stadtbezirke)
1987	89	Essen II	Essen city (only V (Altenessen/Karnap/Vogelheim), VI (Zollverein), and VII (Steele/Kray) Stadtbezirke)
1990	89	Essen II	Essen city (only V (Altenessen/Karnap/Vogelheim), VI (Zollverein), and VII (Steele/Kray) Stadtbezirke)
1994	89	Essen II	Essen city (only V (Altenessen/Karnap/Vogelheim), VI (Zollverein), and VII (Steele/Kray) Stadtbezirke)
1998	89	Essen II	Essen city (only V (Altenessen/Karnap/Vogelheim), VI (Zollverein), and VII (Steele/Kray) Stadtbezirke)
2002	120	Essen II	Essen city (only I (Stadtmitte/Frillendorf), V (Altenessen/Karnap/Vogelheim), VI (Zollverein), and VII (Steele/Kray) Stadtbezirke)
2005	120	Essen II	Essen city (only I (Stadtmitte/Frillendorf), V (Altenessen/Karnap/Vogelheim), VI (Zollverein), and VII (Steele/Kray) Stadtbezirke)
2009	120	Essen II	Essen city (only I (Stadtmitte/Frillendorf), V (Altenessen/Karnap/Vogelheim), VI (Zollverein), and VII (Steele/Kray) Stadtbezirke)
2013	119	Essen II	Essen city (only I (Stadtmitte/Frillendorf), V (Altenessen/Karnap/Vogelheim), VI (Zollverein), and VII (Steele/Kray) Stadtbezirke)
2017	119	Essen II	Essen city (only I (Stadtmitte/Frillendorf), V (Altenessen/Karnap/Vogelheim), VI (Zollverein), and VII (Steele/Kray) Stadtbezirke)
2021	119	Essen II	Essen city (only I (Stadtmitte/Frillendorf), V (Altenessen/Karnap/Vogelheim), VI (Zollverein), and VII (Steele/Kray) Stadtbezirke)
2025	118	Essen II	Essen city (only I (Stadtmitte/Frillendorf), V (Altenessen/Karnap/Vogelheim), VI (Zollverein), and VII (Steele/Kray) Stadtbezirke)

== Members ==
The constituency has been held continuously by the Social Democratic Party (SPD) since 1949. It was first represented by Karl Bergmann from 1949 to 1972, followed by Peter Reuschenbach from 1972 to 1994. Rolf Hempelmann served from 1994 to 2013. Dirk Heidenblut was elected in 2013, and re-elected in 2017 and 2021. Ingo Vogel was elected in 2025

Election	Member	Party	%
1949	Karl Bergmann	SPD	38.9
1953	Karl Bergmann	SPD	47.5
1957	Karl Bergmann	SPD	52.5
1961	Karl Bergmann	SPD	53.0
1965	Karl Bergmann	SPD	59.6
1969	Karl Bergmann	SPD	62.3
1972	Peter Reuschenbach	SPD	69.7
1976	Peter Reuschenbach	SPD	66.3
1980	Peter Reuschenbach	SPD	66.6
1983	Peter Reuschenbach	SPD	63.4
1987	Peter Reuschenbach	SPD	63.9
1990	Peter Reuschenbach	SPD	57.6
1994	Rolf Hempelmann	SPD	60.8
1998	Rolf Hempelmann	SPD	65.3
2002	Rolf Hempelmann	SPD	50.9
2005	Rolf Hempelmann	SPD	58.4
2009	Rolf Hempelmann	SPD	46.1
2013	Dirk Heidenblut	SPD	48.3
2017	Dirk Heidenblut	SPD	37.3
2021	Dirk Heidenblut	SPD	37.8
2025	Ingo Vogel	SPD	30.3

== Election results ==
=== 2025 election ===
Federal election (2025): Essen II
Notes:	Blue background denotes the winner of the electorate vote. Pink background denotes a candidate elected from their party list. Yellow background denotes an electorate win by a list member, or other incumbent. A ✓ or ✗ denotes status of any incumbent, win or lose respectively.						
Party	Candidate	Votes	%	±%	Party votes	%	±%
SPD	Ingo Vogel	34,227	30.3	▼7.5	26,237	23.2	▼10.7
CDU	Florian Fuchs	27,842	24.7	▲1.9	25,277	22.3	▲2.2
AfD	Guido Reil	26,058	23.1	▲11.5	24,911	22.0	▲10.9
Greens	Elke Zeeb	9,316	8.2	▼3.9	10,174	9.0	▼4.4
Left	Eliseo Maugeri	10,655	9.4	▲5.3	12,072	10.7	▲6.3
BSW					6,290	5.6	
FDP	Marcus Fischer	2,683	2.4	▼4.3	3,360	3.0	▼6.2
Tierschutzpartei					1,871	1.7	▼0.2
FW	Martin Stachowiak	1,681	1.5	▲0.3	529	0.5	▼0.1
PARTEI				▼2.3	817	0.7	▼0.6
Volt					700	0.6	▲0.3
MLPD	Gabi Fechtner	461	0.4	▲0.2	158	0.1	0.0
Team Todenhöfer					329	0.3	▼1.4
PdF					181	0.2	▲0.1
dieBasis				▼1.1	161	0.1	▼0.7
BD					137	0.1	
MERA25					66	0.1	
Values					43	0.0	
Pirates							▼0.3
Gesundheitsforschung							▼0.1
Humanists							▼0.1
Bündnis C							▼0.1
ÖDP							▼0.1
SGP						0.0	0.0
Informal votes		1,243			846		
Total valid votes		112,923			113,320		
Turnout		114,166	75.0	▲7.5			
SPD hold	Majority	6,385	5.6				

=== 2021 election ===
Federal election (2021): Essen II
Notes:	Blue background denotes the winner of the electorate vote. Pink background denotes a candidate elected from their party list. Yellow background denotes an electorate win by a list member, or other incumbent. A ✓ or ✗ denotes status of any incumbent, win or lose respectively.						
Party	Candidate	Votes	%	±%	Party votes	%	±%
SPD	✓ Dirk Heidenblut	39,410	37.8	▲0.5	35,363	33.9	▲2.1
CDU	Florian Fuchs	23,735	22.8	▼3.8	21,039	20.2	▼3.3
Greens	Christine Müller-Hechfellner	12,647	12.1	▲6.8	13,971	13.4	▲7.2
AfD	Andrea Poußet	12,015	11.5	▼4.2	11,521	11.0	▼3.9
FDP	Martin Hollinger	6,976	6.7	▲0.1	9,531	9.1	▼0.6
Left	Jules El-Khatib	4,325	4.2	▼3.7	4,525	4.3	▼4.4
Tierschutzpartei					1,924	1.8	▲0.8
Team Todenhöfer					1,718	1.6	
PARTEI	Christian Gröll	2,414	2.3		1,421	1.4	▲0.2
FW	Wilfried Adamy	1,202	1.2		639	0.6	▲0.4
dieBasis	Frank Solga	1,108	1.1		840	0.8	
Pirates					349	0.3	▼0.2
Volt					300	0.3	
LIEBE					190	0.2	
Gesundheitsforschung					155	0.1	0.0
MLPD	Gabi Fechtner	197	0.2	0.0	142	0.1	0.0
NPD					132	0.1	▼0.2
LfK					122	0.1	
Humanists					95	0.1	0.0
DKP	Siw Mammitzsch	169	0.2	0.0	94	0.1	0.0
V-Partei3					74	0.1	0.0
Bündnis C					64	0.1	
du.					60	0.1	
ÖDP					57	0.1	0.0
PdF					35	0.0	
LKR					32	0.0	
SGP					16	0.0	0.0
Informal votes		1,274			1,063		
Total valid votes		104,198			104,409		
Turnout		105,472	67.5	▼0.1			
SPD hold	Majority	15,675	15.0	▲4.3			

=== 2017 election ===
Federal election (2017): Essen II
Notes:	Blue background denotes the winner of the electorate vote. Pink background denotes a candidate elected from their party list. Yellow background denotes an electorate win by a list member, or other incumbent. A ✓ or ✗ denotes status of any incumbent, win or lose respectively.						
Party	Candidate	Votes	%	±%	Party votes	%	±%
SPD	✓ Dirk Heidenblut	40,601	37.3	▼11.0	34,727	31.8	▼9.9
CDU	Jutta Eckenbach	28,912	26.6	▼4.5	25,606	23.4	▼5.0
AfD	Guido Thorsten Reil	17,153	15.8		16,339	15.0	▲10.7
Left	Daniel Kerekes	8,555	7.9	▲0.6	9,524	8.7	▲0.6
FDP	Thomas Spilker	7,207	6.6	▲5.0	10,583	9.7	▲6.3
Greens	Gönül Eglence	5,846	5.4	▲0.3	6,746	6.2	▼0.9
PARTEI					1,224	1.1	▲0.4
Tierschutzpartei					1,088	1.0	
AD-DEMOKRATEN					935	0.9	
Pirates					576	0.5	▼2.0
NPD					378	0.3	▼1.5
FW					239	0.2	0.0
MLPD	Horst Dotten	257	0.2	0.0	186	0.2	0.0
DiB					172	0.2	
Gesundheitsforschung					133	0.1	
Volksabstimmung					132	0.1	▼0.1
DM					128	0.1	
V-Partei³					122	0.1	
BGE					114	0.1	
ÖDP					90	0.1	0.0
DKP	Peter Köster	223	0.2		88	0.1	
Die Humanisten					77	0.1	
SGP					8	0.0	0.0
Informal votes		1,615			1,154		
Total valid votes		108,754			109,215		
Turnout		110,369	67.6	▲2.9			
SPD hold	Majority	11,689	10.7	▼6.5			

=== 2013 election ===
Federal election (2013): Essen II
Notes:	Blue background denotes the winner of the electorate vote. Pink background denotes a candidate elected from their party list. Yellow background denotes an electorate win by a list member, or other incumbent. A ✓ or ✗ denotes status of any incumbent, win or lose respectively.						
Party	Candidate	Votes	%	±%	Party votes	%	±%
SPD	Dirk Heidenblut	51,677	48.3	▲2.2	44,684	41.7	▲2.6
CDU	Jutta Eckenbach	33,243	31.1	▲3.9	30,540	28.5	▲5.0
Left	Janina Herff	7,752	7.2	▼3.2	8,716	8.1	▼3.5
Greens	Elke Zeeb	5,382	5.0	▼1.9	7,616	7.1	▼1.8
AfD					4,556	4.2	
Pirates	Wilfried Adamy	3,048	2.8		2,733	2.5	▲0.8
NPD		2,884	2.7	▲0.6	2,014	1.9	▲0.4
FDP	Günther van Wasen	1,721	1.6	▼4.9	3,627	3.4	▼6.9
PARTEI		734	0.7		723	0.7	
PRO					385	0.4	
REP					370	0.3	▼0.6
BIG					231	0.2	
FW					212	0.2	
Volksabstimmung					191	0.2	▲0.1
MLPD		240	0.2	0.0	168	0.2	0.0
Nichtwahler					153	0.1	
ÖDP					88	0.1	0.0
Party of Reason					92	0.1	
BüSo		304	0.3	▼0.3	81	0.1	▼0.1
RRP					51	0.0	▼0.1
Die Rechte					28	0.0	
PSG					21	0.0	0.0
Informal votes		1,614			1,319		
Total valid votes		106,985			107,280		
Turnout		108,599	64.7	▲1.7			
SPD hold	Majority	18,434	17.2	▼1.7			

=== 2009 election ===
Federal election (2009): Essen II
Notes:	Blue background denotes the winner of the electorate vote. Pink background denotes a candidate elected from their party list. Yellow background denotes an electorate win by a list member, or other incumbent. A ✓ or ✗ denotes status of any incumbent, win or lose respectively.						
Party	Candidate	Votes	%	±%	Party votes	%	±%
SPD	✓ Rolf Hempelmann	49,023	46.1	▼12.3	41,637	39.0	▼12.5
CDU	Jutta Eckenbach	28,968	27.2	▼0.2	25,067	23.5	▼0.4
Left	Hans-Jürgen Zierus	11,065	10.4	▲4.3	12,431	11.7	▲4.2
Greens	Ute Hegener	7,352	6.9	▲3.5	9,495	8.9	▲1.9
FDP	Marcus Fischer	6,967	6.5	▲3.6	10,947	10.3	▲4.0
Pirates					1,852	1.7	
NPD	Volker Braun	2,218	2.1	▲0.6	1,619	1.5	▲0.4
REP					979	0.9	▲0.2
Tierschutzpartei					874	0.8	▲0.2
FAMILIE					565	0.5	▲0.1
RENTNER					407	0.4	
RRP					171	0.2	
BüSo	Katarzyna Kruczkowski	583	0.5		154	0.1	▲0.1
MLPD	Horst Dotten	240	0.2	0.0	141	0.1	0.0
Volksabstimmung					118	0.1	0.0
Centre					74	0.1	0.0
ÖDP					65	0.1	
DVU					62	0.1	
PSG					31	0.0	0.0
Informal votes		1,581			1,308		
Total valid votes		106,416			106,689		
Turnout		107,997	63.0	▼9.7			
SPD hold	Majority	20,055	18.9	▼12.1			

=== 2005 election ===
Federal election (2005): Essen II
Notes:	Blue background denotes the winner of the electorate vote. Pink background denotes a candidate elected from their party list. Yellow background denotes an electorate win by a list member, or other incumbent. A ✓ or ✗ denotes status of any incumbent, win or lose respectively.						
Party	Candidate	Votes	%	±%	Party votes	%	±%
SPD	✓ Rolf Hempelmann	72,664	58.4	▼2.5	64,278	51.5	▼3.0
CDU	Norbert Königshofen	34,099	27.4	▲0.8	29,742	23.8	▼0.6
Left	Siegrid Ehlers	7,603	6.1	▲4.5	9,238	7.4	▲5.7
Greens	Mehrdad Mostofizadeh	4,186	3.4	▼1.2	8,787	7.0	▼1.6
FDP	Marcus Fischer	3,692	3.0	▼1.8	7,848	6.3	▼0.48
NPD	Bernd Kremer	1,862	1.5		1,366	1.1	▲0.7
REP					853	0.7	▼0.2
Tierschutzpartei					795	0.6	▲0.1
GRAUEN					616	0.5	▲0.2
Familie					576	0.5	▲0.1
MLPD	Horst Dotten	328	0.3		204	0.2	
From Now on... Democracy Through Referendum					189	0.2	
PBC					91	0.1	
Socialist Equality Party					52	0.0	
Centre					47	0.0	
BüSo					44	0.0	0.0
Informal votes		2,075			1,783		
Total valid votes		124,434			124,726		
Turnout		126,509	72.6	▼0.7			
SPD hold	Majority	38,565	31				
