= Ulrich Berger =

German politician (1921–2003)

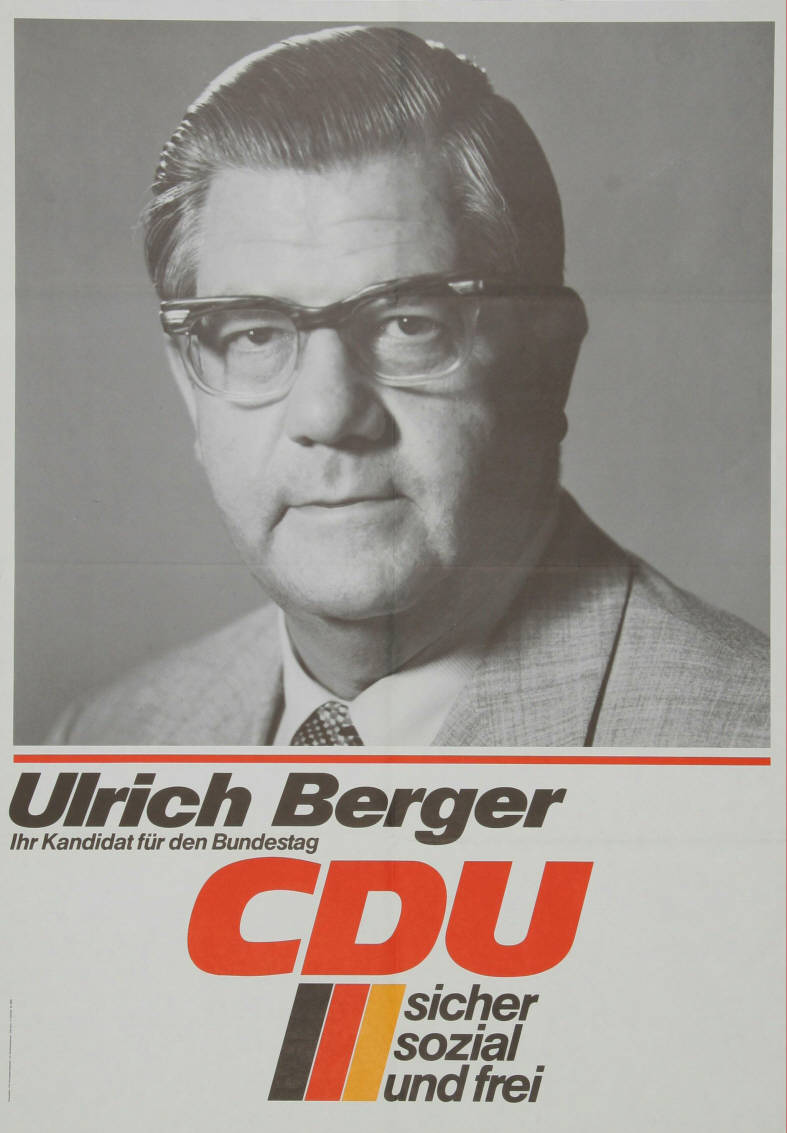
- Election poster (1976)

Member of the Bundestag
- In office 15 October 1957 – 15 October 1961
- In office 22 December 1964 – 4 November 1980

Personal details
- Born: 24 October 1921 Dortmund
- Died: 21 January 2003 (aged 81) Berlin, Germany
- Party: CDU

Ulrich Berger (October 24, 1921 – January 21, 2003) was a German politician of the Christian Democratic Union (CDU) and former member of the German Bundestag.

== Life ==
Berger already joined the CDU in 1945. He was a member of the German Bundestag from 1957 to 1961 and from 22 December 1964, when he succeeded Matthias Hoogen, until 1980. From 1969 to 1980 he was deputy chairman of the Bundestag's Committee on the Interior. From April 3 to July 12, 1958, he also served as a member of the North Rhine-Westphalian state parliament, succeeding Franz Luster-Haggeney.

== Literature ==
Herbst, Ludolf; Jahn, Bruno (2002). Vierhaus, Rudolf (ed.). Biographisches Handbuch der Mitglieder des Deutschen Bundestages. 1949–2002 [Biographical Handbook of the Members of the German Bundestag. 1949–2002] (in German). München: De Gruyter - De Gruyter Saur. p. 1715. ISBN 978-3-11-184511-1.
