= Heinrich Deist =

German politician (1902–1964)

Heinrich Deist (10 December 1902 – 7 March 1964) was as German Social Democratic Party (SPD) politician.

His father was a printer who twice became SPD Prime Minister of Anhalt during the Weimar years.

Heinrich Deist entered the Prussian civil service and reached the position of Regierungsrat by the time Adolf Hitler became Chancellor in 1933. He was subsequently dismissed, whereupon he worked for his wife's stationery company. He then qualified as an auditor, working freelance until the end of the Second World War. He also earned a doctorate in political science from Cologne University.

After the end of the war, Deist was appointed the trade union representative on the supervisory board that controlled the German iron and steel industries. He was also a trade union representative on the mining industry board before he was elected to the Bundesrat in 1953. He became the SPD's primary economic expert and his aim was to move the SPD away from wholesale nationalisation and class-war attacks on private property. At the SPD's 1958 Stuttgart conference Deist put forward his plan for freiheitliche Ordnung der Wirtschaft (freedom-loving organisation of the economy). Similar to the concept of the social market economy, this proposal included indirect controls of budgetary planning and has been called "a market economy of the left". It was passed by a huge majority of delegates. In a speech to the conference, Deist said:

We should not give ourselves up to the illusion that through transfer into public ownership the problem of dependence and bondage of the worker in the factories is already solved. ... And if we ask our English comrades how the worker problem and codetermination of the worker in the nationalised industries has worked out, then we will hear from them that his problem is not solved through nationalisation alone.

Deist was the principal author of the SPD's 1959 Godesberg Program, which committed the party to welfare capitalism in place of its traditional Marxism. Deist explained in the Neue Gesellschaft that the experience of Communism and Fascism had taught the SPD the dangers of a huge state bureaucracy. Public controls and the distribution of economic power were preferable to socialisation: "A free order demands variety in every respect. Its decisive criteria are therefore pluralism, decentralisation, autonomy".

== Works ==
- Wirtschaft von morgen. Beiträge zur Wirtschaftspolitik der SPD (Berlin: J. H. W. Dietz Nachf, 1959).
