= Wolfgang Döring =

German politician (1919–1963)

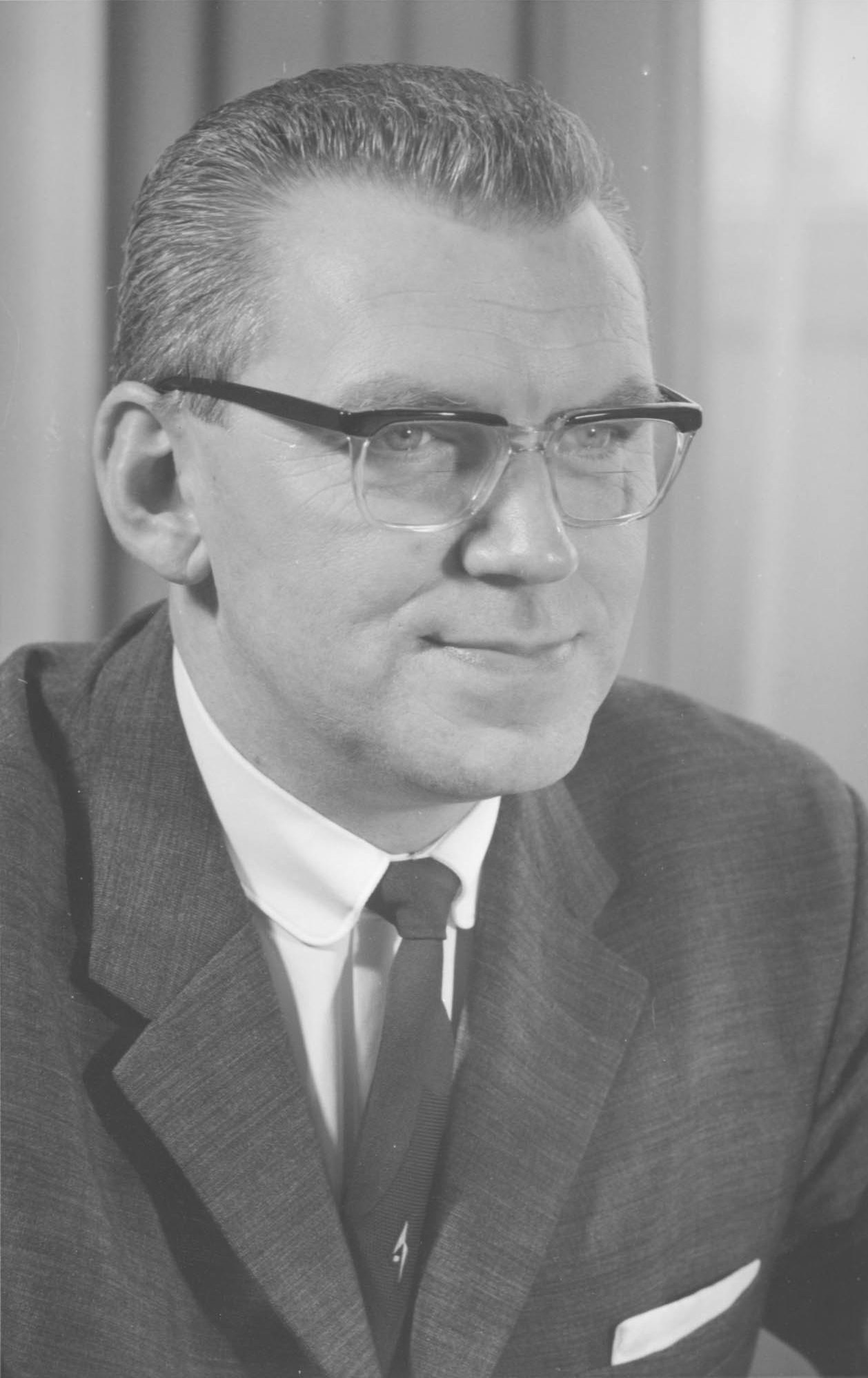

Member of the Bundestag
- In office 15 October 1957 – 17 January 1963

Personal details
- Born: 11 November 1919 Leipzig, Germany
- Died: 17 January 1963 (aged 43)
- Party: FDP

Wolfgang Döring (11 November 1919 – 17 January 1963) was a German politician of the Free Democratic Party (FDP) and former member of the German Bundestag.

== Life ==
From 1954 to 1958 Döring was a member of the state parliament in North Rhine-Westphalia. In 1955 he became deputy parliamentary party leader and, after the change of government on 12 March 1956, chairman of the FDP parliamentary party.

From 15 October 1957, until his death, Döring was a member of the German Bundestag. He was elected via the state list in North Rhine-Westphalia and had been deputy chairman of the FDP parliamentary faction since 1961.

== Literature ==
Herbst, Ludolf; Jahn, Bruno (2002). Vierhaus, Rudolf (ed.). Biographisches Handbuch der Mitglieder des Deutschen Bundestages. 1949–2002 [Biographical Handbook of the Members of the German Bundestag. 1949–2002] (in German). München: De Gruyter – De Gruyter Saur. p. 1715. ISBN 978-3-11-184511-1.
