= Volrad Deneke =

German politician (1920–2006)

J.F. Volrad Deneke

Member of the Bundestag
- In office 26 July 1963 – 17 October 1965

Personal details
- Born: 8 March 1920 Wernigerode
- Died: 19 September 2006 (aged 86)
- Party: FDP

J.F. Volrad Deneke (8 March 1920 – 19 September 2006) was a German politician of the Free Democratic Party (FDP) and former member of the German Bundestag.

== Life ==
Deneke was a member of the German Bundestag from 26 July 1963, when he succeeded Ernst Keller, who had died, until 1965. He had entered parliament via the state list of the FDP North Rhine-Westphalia.

== Literature ==
Herbst, Ludolf; Jahn, Bruno (2002). Vierhaus, Rudolf (ed.). Biographisches Handbuch der Mitglieder des Deutschen Bundestages. 1949–2002 [Biographical Handbook of the Members of the German Bundestag. 1949–2002] (in German). München: De Gruyter - De Gruyter Saur. p. 1715. ISBN 978-3-11-184511-1.
