= Annemarie Ackermann =

German politician (1913–1994)

Member of the Bundestag
- In office 6 October 1953 – 17 October 1965

Personal details
- Born: 16 May 1913 Parabutsch
- Died: 18 February 1994 (aged 80) Königswinter, Germany
- Party: CDU

Annemarie Ackermann (May 16, 1913 – February 18, 1994) was a German politician of the Christian Democratic Union (CDU) and former member of the German Bundestag.

== Life ==
Annemarie Ackermann was a member of the German Bundestag for the first time from 1953 to 1961. On January 16, 1965, she succeeded Gerhard Fritz, who had resigned, as a member of the Bundestag, where she remained until the end of the fourth term in October 1965. She always entered the Bundestag via the CDU state list for Rhineland-Palatinate.

== Literature ==
Herbst, Ludolf; Jahn, Bruno (2002). Vierhaus, Rudolf (ed.). Biographisches Handbuch der Mitglieder des Deutschen Bundestages. 1949–2002 [Biographical Handbook of the Members of the German Bundestag. 1949–2002] (in German). München: De Gruyter - De Gruyter Saur. p. 1715. ISBN 978-3-11-184511-1.
