= Dirk Heidenblut =

German politician

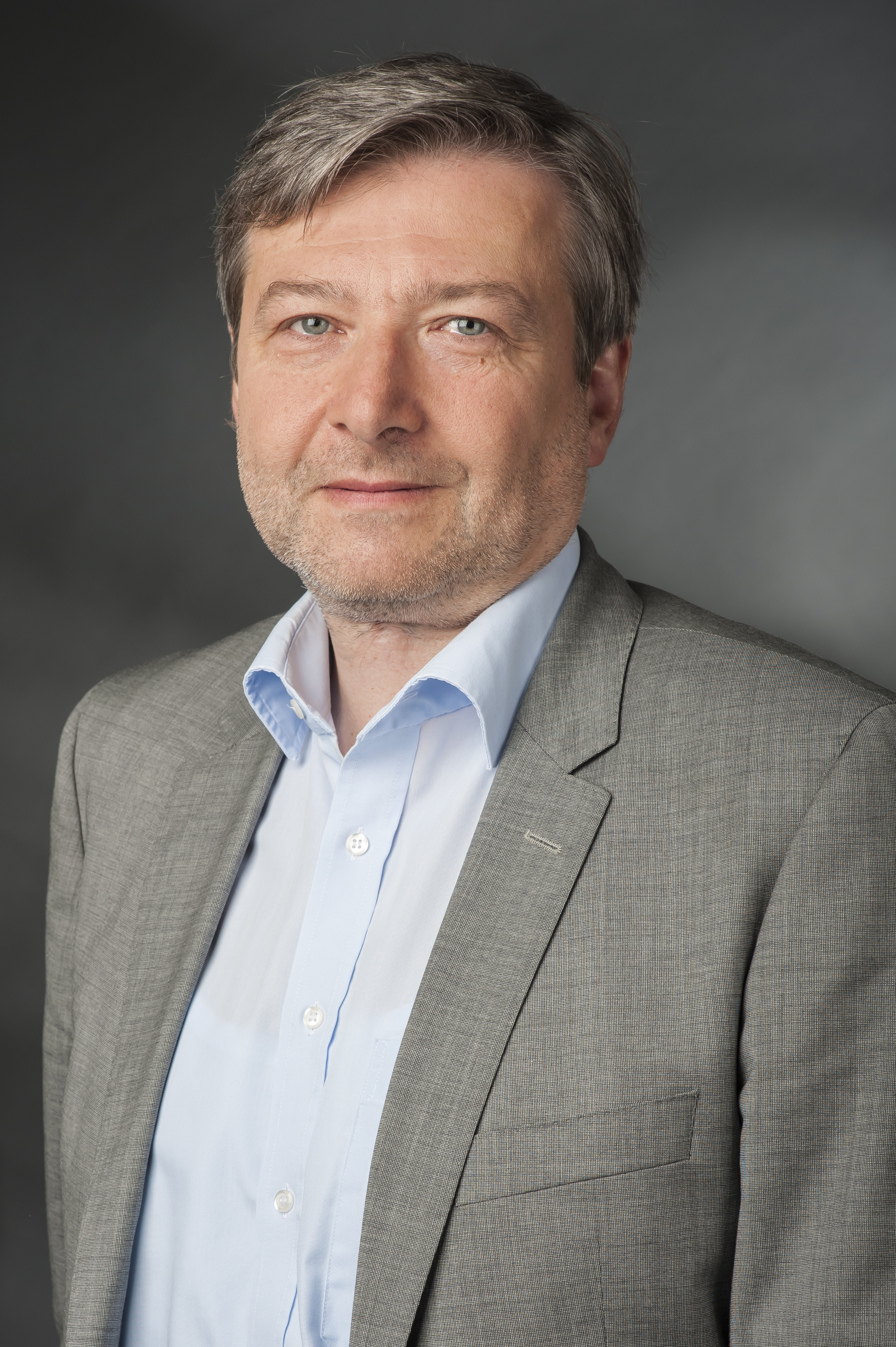
- Dirk Heidenblut in 2014

Member of the Bundestag
- In office 2013–2025
- Preceded by: Rolf Hempelmann

Personal details
- Born: 21 April 1961 (age 64) Essen, West Germany (now Germany)
- Party: SPD

Dirk Heidenblut (born 21 April 1961) is a German politician of the Social Democratic Party (SPD) who served as a member of the Bundestag from the state of North Rhine-Westphalia from 2013 to 2025.

== Political career ==
Heidenblut first became a member of the Bundestag in the 2013 German federal election, representing the Essen II district. He was a member of the Committee on Health. In this capacity, he served as his parliamentary group's rapporteur on the digitization of healthcare in Germany.

In 2024, Heidenblut announced that he would not stand in the 2025 federal elections but instead resign from active politics by the end of the parliamentary term.
