= Rudolf Vogel (politician, born 1906) =

German politician

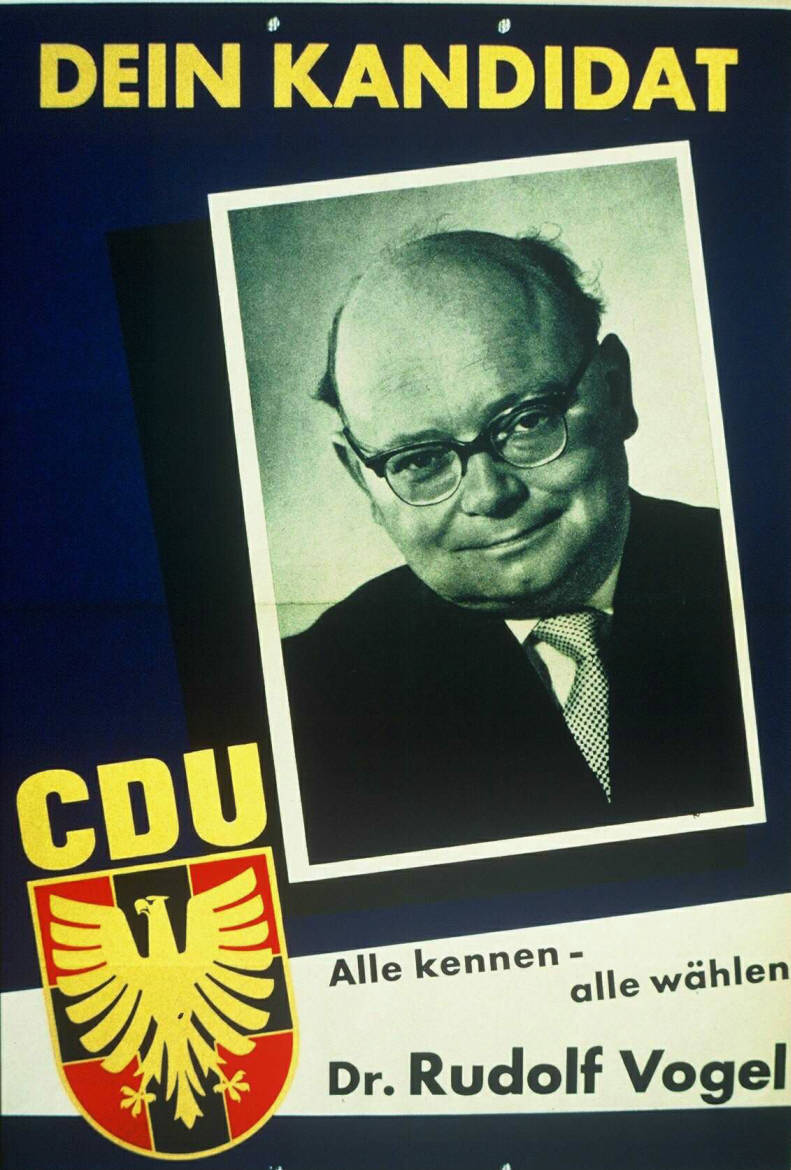
- Election poster (1953)

Member of the Bundestag
- In office 7 September 1949 – 15 April 1964

Personal details
- Born: 18 April 1906 Beuthen
- Died: 4 June 1991 (aged 85) Starnberg
- Party: CDU

Rudolf Vogel (April 18, 1906 in Beuthen; June 4, 1991 in Starnberg) was a German politician of the Christian Democratic Union (CDU) and former member of the German Bundestag.

== Life ==
He was a member of the German Bundestag from its first election in 1949 until 15 April 1964. He represented the constituency of Aalen in parliament. From 1949 to 1953 Vogel was chairman of the Bundestag committee for press, radio and film issues.

== Literature ==
Herbst, Ludolf; Jahn, Bruno (2002). Vierhaus, Rudolf (ed.). Biographisches Handbuch der Mitglieder des Deutschen Bundestages. 1949–2002 [Biographical Handbook of the Members of the German Bundestag. 1949–2002] (in German). München: De Gruyter - De Gruyter Saur. p. 1715. ISBN 978-3-11-184511-1.
