= Johannes Even =

German politician (1903–1964)

Member of the Bundestag
- In office 7 September 1949 – 24 November 1964

Personal details
- Born: 10 December 1903 Essen
- Died: 24 November 1964 (aged 60) Köln, North Rhine-Westphalia, Germany
- Party: CDU

Johannes Even (December 10, 1903 – November 24, 1964) was a German politician of the Christian Democratic Union (CDU) and former member of the German Bundestag.

== Life ==
After the Second World War, Even participated in the foundation of the CDU in the district of Bergheim (Erft). Since 1960, he was a member of the state and federal executive committees. From 1946 to 1950, Even was a member of the state parliament of North Rhine-Westphalia.

From 1949 until his death in 1964, Even was a member of the Bundestag. He was always directly elected to parliament in the constituency of Bergheim-Euskirchen. From 1953, Even was a member of the executive committee of the CDU/CSU parliamentary group.

== Literature ==
Herbst, Ludolf; Jahn, Bruno (2002). Vierhaus, Rudolf (ed.). Biographisches Handbuch der Mitglieder des Deutschen Bundestages. 1949–2002 [Biographical Handbook of the Members of the German Bundestag. 1949–2002] (in German). München: De Gruyter - De Gruyter Saur. p. 1715. ISBN 978-3-11-184511-1.
