= Hermann Höcherl =

German politician (1912–1989)

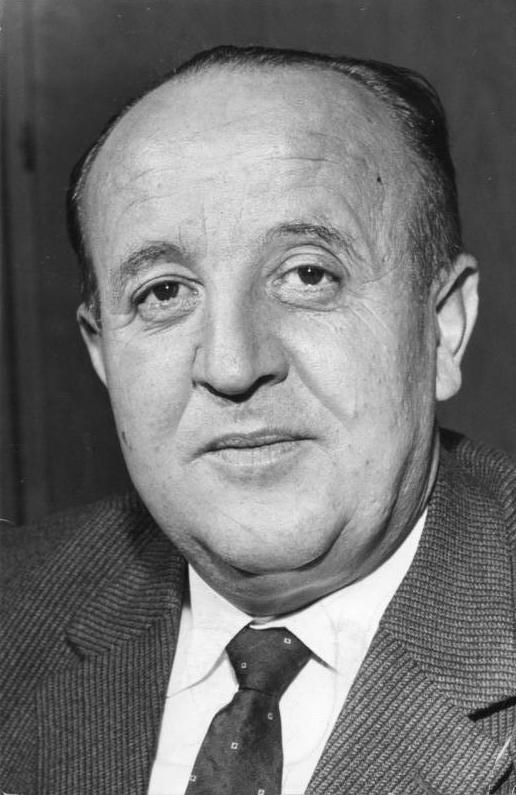
- Höcherl in 1961

Minister for Food, Agriculture and Forests
- In office 26 October 1965 – 21 October 1969
- Chancellor: Ludwig Erhard; Kurt Georg Kiesinger
- Preceded by: Werner Schwarz
- Succeeded by: Josef Ertl

Minister of the Interior
- In office 14 November 1961 – 25 October 1965
- Chancellor: Konrad Adenauer; Ludwig Erhard
- Preceded by: Gerhard Schröder
- Succeeded by: Paul Lücke

Member of the Bundestag; for Regensburg
- In office 6 October 1953 – 14 December 1976
- Preceded by: Max Solleder
- Succeeded by: Albert Schedl

Personal details
- Born: 31 March 1912 Brennberg, Germany
- Died: 18 May 1989 (aged 77) Regensburg, West Germany
- Party: Christian Social Union (1949–1989)
- Other political affiliations: Nazi Party (1931–1932; 1935–1945)
- Education: University of Bonn

Hermann Höcherl (31 March 1912 – 18 May 1989) was a German politician of the Christian Social Union in Bavaria (CSU). He served as West Germany's Federal Ministry of the Interior from 1961 to 1965 and as Federal Minister for Food, Agriculture and Forests from 1965 to 1969.

== Life and career ==
Höcherl was born in Brennberg near Regensburg, Bavaria, but was raised by his grandfather near Roding. Having obtained his Abitur degree in 1931, he studied law at the Friedrich Wilhelm University of Berlin, at Aix-Marseille University, and at the Ludwig-Maximilians-Universität München. He passed the Second State Examination in 1938 and first served as a Gerichtsassessor, from 1940 as a public prosecutor in Regensburg.

He had joined the Nazi Party in 1931; after leaving it in 1932, he rejoined in 1935. In 1942, he volunteered for the Wehrmacht armed forces in the rank of Lieutenant, with his service being in Nazi occupied Poland, and later in combat in Greece, Finland and Soviet Russia.

After the war, Höcherl from 1948 practised as a lawyer. In 1950, he was again appointed public prosecutor in Deggendorf and judge in Regensburg in 1951.

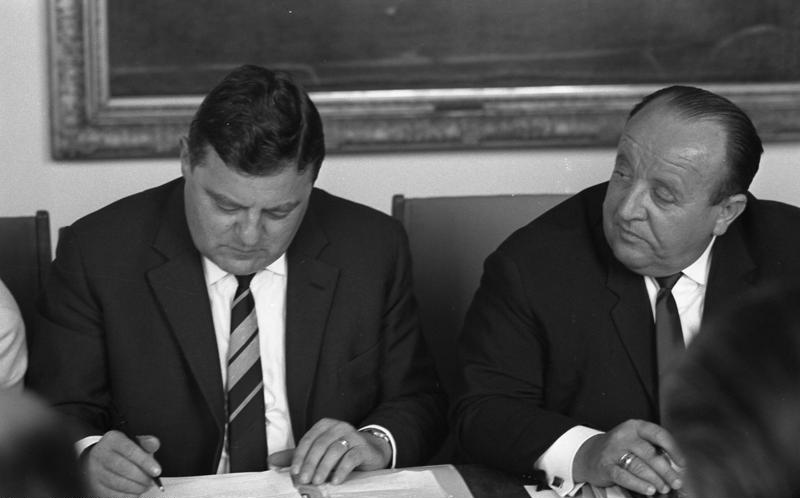
Höcherl (right) and Franz Josef Strauss in 1965

Höcherl joined the Christian Social Union in 1949. He soon became a board member in the Upper Palatinate district and in 1952 also a member of the state executive committee. Höcherl was first elected to the Bundestag in 1953, representing Regensburg.

Upon the 1961 federal election, he became Minister of the Interior in the cabinet of Chancellor Konrad Adenauer and retained this office, when Adenauer was succeeded by Ludwig Erhard in 1963. After the 1965 election, he was appointed Minister for Food, Agriculture and Forests and held this office in the grand coalition government of Chancellor Kurt Georg Kiesinger until 1969. His term of office as Interior Minister was overshadowed by a bugging affair at the Federal Office for the Protection of the Constitution in 1963.

Political offices
Preceded by Gerhard Schröder	Federal Minister of the Interior (Germany); 1961–1965	Succeeded by Paul Lücke
Preceded by Werner Schwarz	Federal Minister for Food, Agriculture and Forests (Germany); 1965–1969	Succeeded by Josef Ertl
