= Josef Ertl =

German politician (1925–2000)

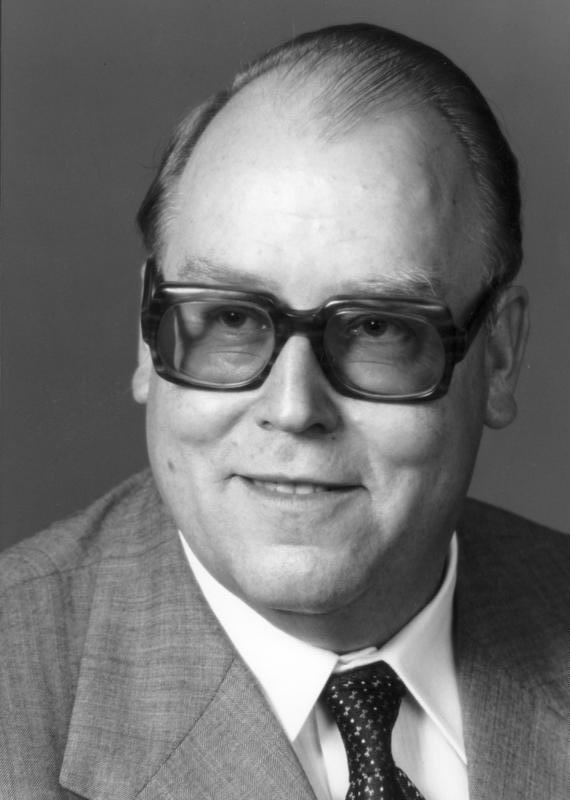

Minister of Food and Agriculture
- In office 22 October 1969 – 29 March 1983
- Prime Minister: Willy Brandt; Helmut Schmidt; Helmut Kohl
- Preceded by: Hermann Höcherl
- Succeeded by: Ignaz Kiechle

Member of the Bundestag
- In office 17 October 1961 – 18 February 1987

Personal details
- Born: 7 March 1925 Munich, Germany
- Died: 16 November 2000 (aged 75) Murnau, Germany
- Party: Free Democratic Party
- Education: Technical University of Munich

Josef Ertl (7 March 1925 – 16 November 2000) was a German politician who served as the minister of agriculture in different cabinets of West Germany and was a member of the Free Democratic Party (FDP).

== Early life and education ==
Ertl's family were from Bavaria. He was born on 7 March 1925 and raised in Munich.

Ertl held a bachelor's degree in agriculture from the Technical University of Munich in 1952.

== Career ==
Ertl was a member of the FDP which he joined in the 1950s. He was part of the liberal right wing in the party. He served in the FDP's regional council of Munich from 1952 to 1956. He was a member of the Bundestag from 1961 to 1987. He also headed the Bavarian branch of the party from 1971 to 1983. He was among the West German politicians who shaped the Europe policy of the country in the 1970s.

He was appointed minister of agriculture to the coalition government led by Prime Minister Willy Brandt on 22 October 1969. Ertl replaced Hermann Höcherl in the post. He retained his post until 1983 in various cabinets, but for a short period from 17 September to 1 October 1982 Björn Engholm assumed the post.

After leaving office he served as the president of the German agricultural society from early 1984 to late 1990. He was also the president of the German ski association from 1978 to 1991.

== Death ==
Ertl was seriously injured in an accident on the farm of his son in the Upper Bavarian district of Landsberg am Lech in mid-November 2000. He died of complications resulting from severe burn injuries on 20 November 2000 in Murnau at the age of 75.
