= Rudolf-Ernst Heiland =

German politician (1910–1965)

Member of the Bundestag
- In office 7 September 1949 – 6 May 1965

Mayor of Marl
- In office 1946 – 6 May 1965

Personal details
- Born: 8 September 1910 Hohendorf/Saxony
- Died: 6 May 1965 (aged 54) Marl, North Rhine-Westphalia
- Party: SPD
- Occupation: politician

Rudolf-Ernst Heiland (September 8, 1910 – May 6, 1965) was a German politician of the Social Democratic Party (SPD) and former member of the German Bundestag. In the public, he was known as Rudi Heiland.

== Life ==
Heiland was a member of the Parliamentary Council in 1948/49. He was a member of the German Bundestag from its first election in 1949 and from 1946 the mayor (German: Bürgermeister) of the town Marl, North Rhine-Westphalia after WWII until his death in 1965.

== Literature ==
Herbst, Ludolf; Jahn, Bruno (2002). Vierhaus, Rudolf (ed.). Biographisches Handbuch der Mitglieder des Deutschen Bundestages. 1949–2002 [Biographical Handbook of the Members of the German Bundestag. 1949–2002] (in German). München: De Gruyter - De Gruyter Saur. p. 1715. ISBN 978-3-11-184511-1.
