= Werner Schwarz (politician) =

German politician

Michael Carl Werner Schwarz
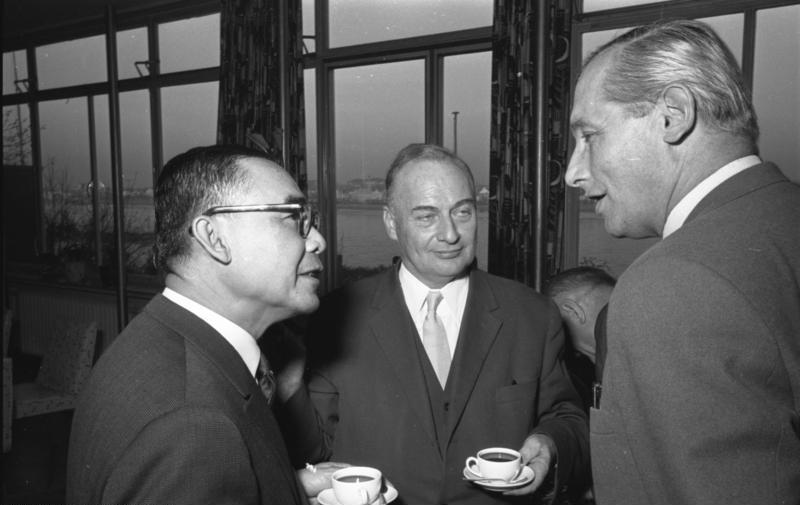
- Werner Schwarz (center) at a reception for Thai politicians, 1959

Federal Minister of Food, Agriculture and Forestry
- In office 14 October 1959 – 26 October 1965
- Chancellor: Konrad Adenauer, Ludwig Erhard
- Preceded by: Heinrich Lübke
- Succeeded by: Hermann Höcherl

Personal details
- Born: January 21, 1900; Hamburg, Germany
- Died: September 2, 1982 (aged 82); Gut Frauenholz near Bad Oldesloe, Germany
- Political party: CDU
- Children: Henning Schwarz, Günther Schwarz
- Relatives: Sabine Sütterlin-Waack (granddaughter), Werner Schwarz (grandson)
- Education: Agricultural training, agricultural studies
- Profession: Politician

Michael Carl Werner Schwarz (21 January 1900 in Hamburg – 2 September 1982 at Gut Frauenholz near Bad Oldesloe) was a German politician (CDU). He was the Federal Minister of Food, Agriculture and Forestry from 1959 to 1965.

== Life ==
Werner Schwarz was born in 1900 as the son of a merchant in Hamburg-Uhlenhorst. After attending high school in Hamburg-Bergedorf, he went to trade school in Hamburg in 1917. In 1918, he participated in World War I as a soldier. From 1918 to 1922, he completed agricultural training and studied agriculture from 1922 to 1925. From 1926 onwards, he was a self-employed farmer at Gut Frauenholz. From 1948 to 1959, Schwarz was the second state chairman of the Schleswig-Holstein Farmers' Association and simultaneously a member of the presidency of the German Farmers' Association.

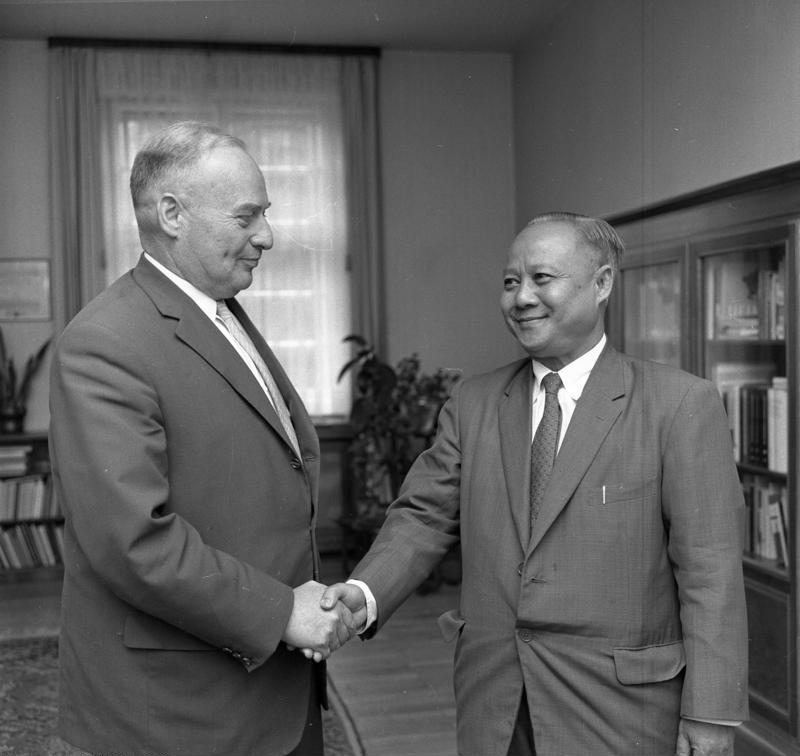
Werner Schwarz (left) with his Burmese counterpart Saw-Hla-Tun, 1961

Werner Schwarz is the father of Schleswig-Holstein state minister Henning Schwarz (1928–1993), who was acting Minister-President of Schleswig-Holstein from 1987 to 1988, and thus the grandfather of politician Sabine Sütterlin-Waack (born 1958). Through his son Günther (1928–2014), who was mayor of the municipality of Rethwisch from 1987 to 1994, he is also the grandfather of the farmers' association official and politician Werner Schwarz (born 1960). Two of his grandchildren are thus simultaneously Schleswig-Holstein state ministers in the Second Günther cabinet.

From 1953 to 1965, Schwarz was a Member of the Bundestag (MdB). He was always directly elected as the representative of the Stormarn constituency in the Bundestag.

After Heinrich Lübke was elected Federal President, Schwarz was appointed Federal Minister of Food, Agriculture and Forestry on 14 October 1959 as his successor in the federal government led by Chancellor Konrad Adenauer. He retained this position initially under Chancellor Ludwig Erhard and then left the federal government on 26 October 1965 after the 1965 West German federal election.
