= Heinrich Gerns =

German politician (1892–1963)

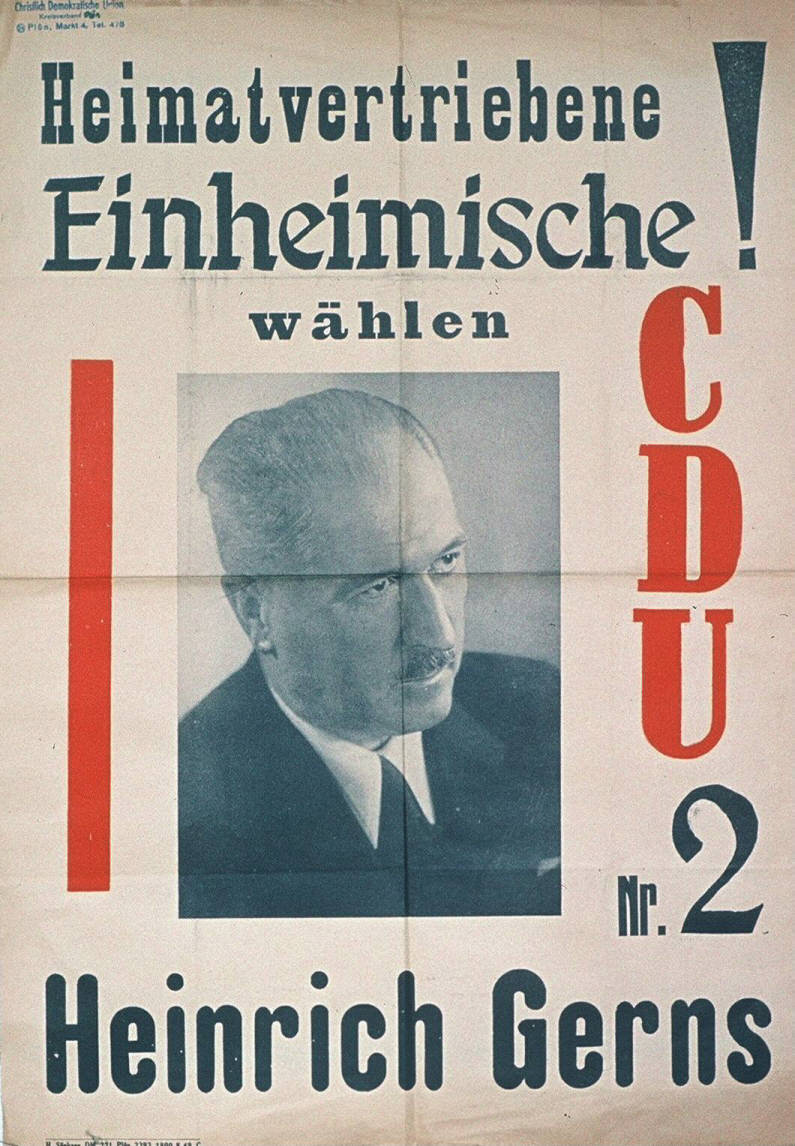
- Heinrich Gerns on a campaign poster for the 1949 Bundestag elections

Member of the Bundestag
- In office 7 September 1949 – 20 August 1963

Personal details
- Born: 22 April 1892 Hannover
- Died: 20 August 1963 (aged 71) Kiel, Schleswig-Holstein, Germany
- Party: CDU

Heinrich Gerns (April 22, 1892 – August 20, 1963) was a German politician of the Christian Democratic Union (CDU) and former member of the German Bundestag.

== Life ==
In World War I Gerns was soldier. After World War I he worked as farmer. Before World War II Gerns was member of the political party DNVP. In 1945 he was co-founder of the CDU in the Plön district and became district chairman there in 1952. He was a member of the German Bundestag from its first election in 1949 until his death.

== Literature ==
Herbst, Ludolf; Jahn, Bruno (2002). Vierhaus, Rudolf (ed.). Biographisches Handbuch der Mitglieder des Deutschen Bundestages. 1949–2002 [Biographical Handbook of the Members of the German Bundestag. 1949–2002] (in German). München: De Gruyter - De Gruyter Saur. p. 1715. ISBN 978-3-11-184511-1.
