= Richard Burckardt =

German politician

Member of the Bundestag
- In office 17 October 1961 – 17 October 1965

Personal details
- Born: 23 July 1901 Leverkusen
- Died: 14 November 1981 (aged 80)
- Party: FDP

Richard Burckardt (23 July 1901 – 14 November 1981) was a German politician of the Free Democratic Party (FDP) and former member of the German Bundestag.

== Life ==
In the 1961 federal elections he entered the Bundestag via the North Rhine-Westphalia state list, of which he was a member until 1965. From 1963 to 1965 he was deputy chairman of the Bundestag Committee on Foreign Trade.

== Literature ==
Herbst, Ludolf; Jahn, Bruno (2002). Vierhaus, Rudolf (ed.). Biographisches Handbuch der Mitglieder des Deutschen Bundestages. 1949–2002 [Biographical Handbook of the Members of the German Bundestag. 1949–2002] (in German). München: De Gruyter - De Gruyter Saur. p. 1715. ISBN 978-3-11-184511-1.
