= Luise Rehling =

German politician

Member of the Bundestag
- In office 7 September 1949 – 29 May 1964

Personal details
- Born: 30 November 1896
- Died: 29 May 1964 (aged 67)
- Party: CDU

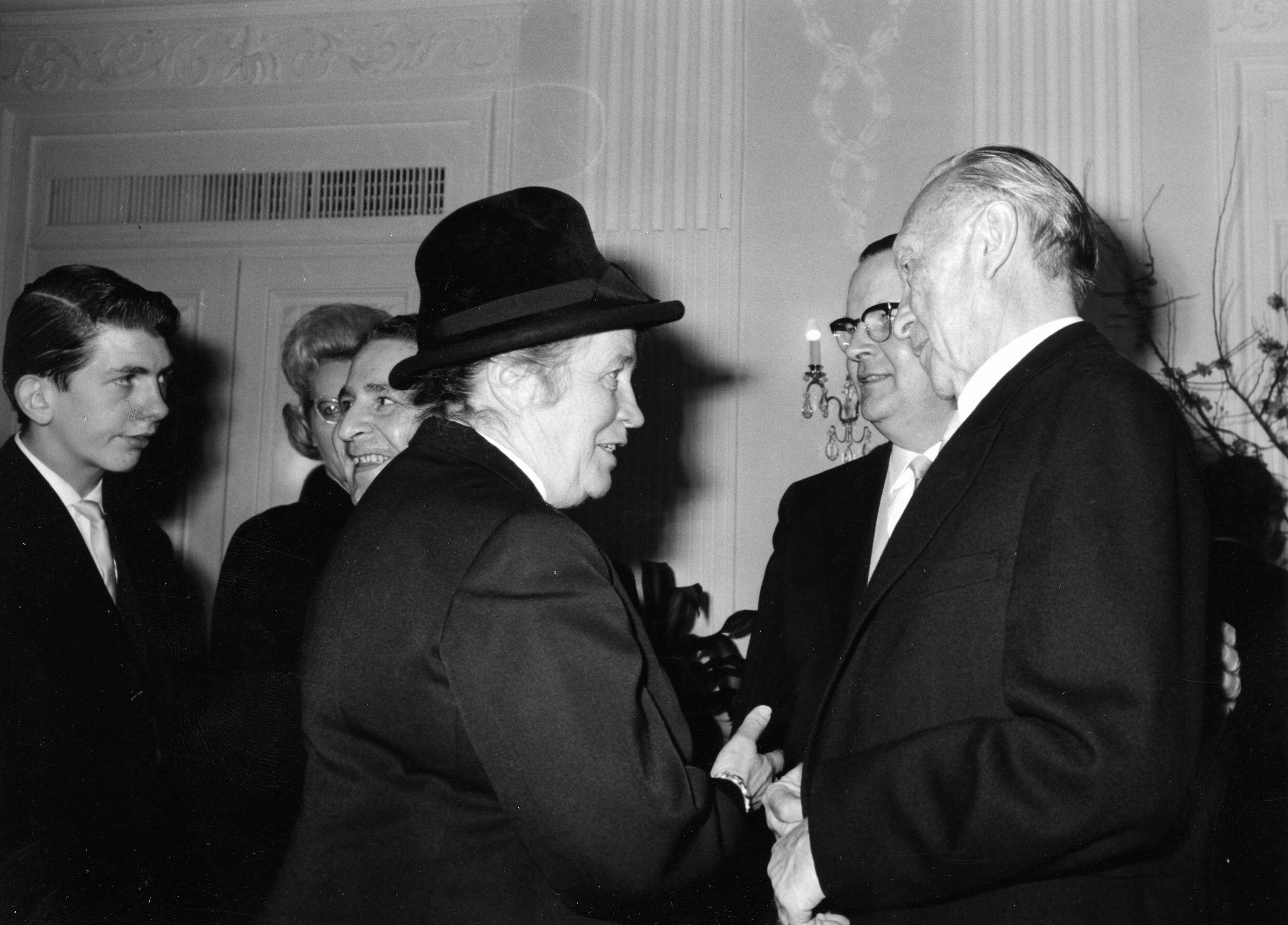
Luise Rehling congratulates Konrad Adenauer on his 88th birthday in January 1964.

Luise Rehling (née Dieckerhoff; 30 November 1896 – 29 May 1964) was a German politician of the Christian Democratic Union (CDU) and former member of the German Bundestag.

== Life ==
Luise Dieckerhoff grew up in a Protestant parsonage. After graduating from high school, she worked as a teacher for two years due to the First World War. From 1919, she studied history, geography, and English at Marburg University, the University of Bonn, the Ludwig-Maximilians-Universität München, and the University of Münster. At the latter, she received her doctorate in 1926 under Hermann Wätjen with her “critical study of German foreign policy” Deutschland–England und das Orientproblem in den neunziger Jahren (Germany–England and the Orient Problem in the 1890s), which was awarded summa cum laude.

At Martin Niemöller's house, she met Pastor Kurt Rehling, whom she married in 1925. From 1928 onwards, she worked alongside him in the Luther parish in Hagen. Their three daughters were born in the local rectory. Because of their membership in the Confessing Church, the couple had many conflicts with the National Socialists. When her husband was drafted into the Wehrmacht in 1939, Luise Rehling continued her work in the parish.

In 1945, the Rehling couple were among the founders of the CDU in Hagen. Luise Rehling became a city councilor in 1946.

She was a member of the German Bundestag from 1949 until her death. In 1949, 1953 and 1957, she won the direct mandate in the electoral district of Hagen, in 1961, she entered parliament via the state list of the CDU North Rhine-Westphalia. From 1950 to 1964, Rehling was a member of the Parliamentary Assembly of the Council of Europe. From 14 April 1964 until her death, she was the deputy leader of the CDU/CSU parliamentary group.

Luise Rehling died on 29 May 1964, after suffering a stroke. She is buried in the Remberg Cemetery in Hagen.

In 1996, the city of Hagen named a secondary school after Luise Rehling, not least because, as a member of the municipal school board, she had been very committed to developing the school landscape in Hagen.

== Literature ==
Herbst, Ludolf; Jahn, Bruno (2002). Vierhaus, Rudolf (ed.). Biographisches Handbuch der Mitglieder des Deutschen Bundestages. 1949–2002 [Biographical Handbook of the Members of the German Bundestag. 1949–2002] (in German). München: De Gruyter - De Gruyter Saur. p. 1715. ISBN 978-3-11-184511-1.
