= Matthias Hoogen =

German politician (1904–1985)

Member of the Bundestag
- In office September 7, 1949 – December 11, 1964

Personal details
- Born: 25 June 1904
- Died: July 13, 1985 (aged 81)
- Party: CDU

Matthias Hoogen (June 25, 1904 – July 13, 1985) was a German politician of the Christian Democratic Union (CDU) and former member of the German Bundestag.

== Life ==
In 1945 Hoogen participated in the refoundation of the centre. Shortly before the 1949 federal elections, he joined the CDU.

Hoogen was a member of the Economic Council of Bizone in 1948/49. He was a member of the German Bundestag from its first election in 1949 to 1964 and represented the constituency of Kempen-Krefeld in parliament as a member of parliament who was always directly elected.

== Literature ==
Herbst, Ludolf; Jahn, Bruno (2002). Vierhaus, Rudolf (ed.). Biographisches Handbuch der Mitglieder des Deutschen Bundestages. 1949–2002 [Biographical Handbook of the Members of the German Bundestag. 1949–2002] (in German). München: De Gruyter - De Gruyter Saur. p. 1715. ISBN 978-3-11-184511-1.
