= Karl Bergmann (politician) =

German politician (1907–1979)

Member of the Bundestag
- In office 7 September 1949 – 22 September 1972

Member of the European Parliament
- In office 27 February 1958 – 21 January 1970

Personal details
- Born: 7 June 1907 Duisburg
- Died: 21 August 1979 (aged 72)
- Party: SPD

Karl Bergmann (7 June 1907 – 21 August 1979) was a German politician of the Social Democratic Party (SPD) and former member of the German Bundestag.

== Life ==
Bergmann was a member of the state parliament of North Rhine-Westphalia from 1946 to 1950. He had been a member of the German Bundestag since the first federal elections in 1949 to 1972. He represented the constituency Essen II in parliament.

From 27 February 1958 to 21 January 1970 Bergmann was also a member of the European Parliament.

== Literature ==
Herbst, Ludolf; Jahn, Bruno (2002). Vierhaus, Rudolf (ed.). Biographisches Handbuch der Mitglieder des Deutschen Bundestages. 1949–2002 [Biographical Handbook of the Members of the German Bundestag. 1949–2002] (in German). München: De Gruyter - De Gruyter Saur. p. 1715. ISBN 978-3-11-184511-1.
