= Albrecht Aschoff =

German politician

Member of the Bundestag
- In office 17 October 1961 – 17 October 1965

Personal details
- Born: 11 April 1899 Berlin
- Died: 11 August 1972 (aged 73)
- Party: FDP

Albrecht Aschoff (11 September 1899 – 11 August 1972) was a German officer of the Imperial German Army, the Reichswehr and the Wehrmacht, jurist and politician of the Free Democratic Party (FDP) as well as former member of the German Bundestag.

== Life ==
Aschoff was the son of Sanitätsrat Prof. Dr. med. Albert Aschoff (1868–1945). At the end of WWII, Oberst Dr. jur. Aschoff was taken prisoner with the 16th Panzer Division by the Russians and finally returned home in 1955.

He was a member of the German Bundestag from 17 October 1961 to 17 October 1965 (one legislative period). He was elected via the FDP state list in North Rhine-Westphalia. From 1961 to 1963 he was a delegate of the Bundestag in the European Parliament. In addition, he had been Chairman of the Bundestag's Economic Committee since 9 January 1963.

== Literature ==
Herbst, Ludolf; Jahn, Bruno (2002). Vierhaus, Rudolf (ed.). Biographisches Handbuch der Mitglieder des Deutschen Bundestages. 1949–2002 [Biographical Handbook of the Members of the German Bundestag. 1949–2002] (in German). München: De Gruyter - De Gruyter Saur. p. 1715. ISBN 978-3-11-184511-1.
