= Robert Pferdmenges =

German banker and politician (1880–1962)

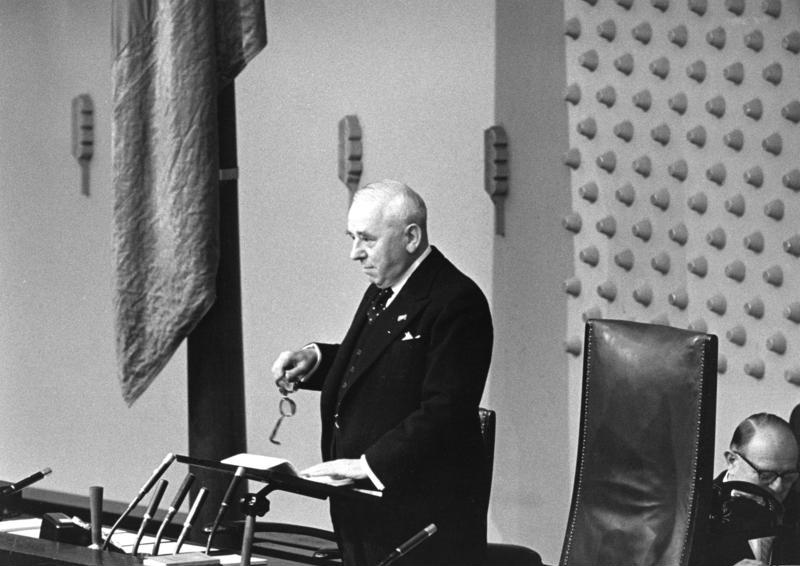
- Robert Pferdmenges in 1961 at the Bundestag

Member of the Bundestag
- In office 12 January 1950 – 28 September 1962

Personal details
- Born: 27 March 1880 Mönchengladbach
- Died: 28 September 1962 (aged 82) Cologne, Germany
- Party: CDU

Robert Pferdmenges (27 March 1880 in Mönchengladbach – 28 September 1962 in Cologne) was a German banker and CDU politician. He was a member of the Bundestag from 1950 to 1962 and a close friend to Konrad Adenauer.

== Life and profession ==
After attending school and doing military service with the Leibdragoners in Darmstadt, Pferdmenges completed a banking apprenticeship at the Bergisch-Märkische Bank. From 1901 he worked at the London branch of Disconto-Gesellschaft, becoming branch manager there after a few years. In 1913, he moved to the Antwerp branch of the same banking institution. Shortly thereafter, he was enlisted in the reserve regiment of the Darmstadt Leibdragoners, again detached to Antwerp for civil administration, and returned to Cologne in 1919 as a Rittmeister.

From 1919 to 1929, he was a member of the board of directors of A. Schaaffhausen'scher Bankverein in Cologne; as chairman of the board, he was instrumental in the 1929 merger of Disconto-Gesellschaft with Deutsche Bank and became a member of the supervisory board of Deutsche Bank. In 1931, at the instigation of Reich Chancellor Heinrich Brüning, Pferdmenges became deputy chairman of the supervisory board of Dresdner Bank and, a year later, also a member of an expert commission on the establishment of state banking supervision. In 1932, he became a member of the General Council and the Central Committee of the Reichsbank, but left the body again a year later. He had already been chairman of the Association of Banks and Bankers in Rhineland and Westphalia since 1921; he gave up the post when the National Socialists came to power in 1933. He was also a member of the German Gentlemen's Club, an influential association of high-ranking conservative personalities in the Weimar Republic.

== Bibliography ==
- Peter Fuchs: Nur wenige Kölner haben Pferdmenges je gesehen. In: Kölner Themen. Greven, Köln 1996, ISBN 3-7743-0292-8.
- Nikolaus Jakobsen: Robert Pferdmenges. Olzog, München 1957.
- Christoph Silber-Bonz: Pferdmenges und Adenauer. Bouvier, Bonn 1997, ISBN 978-3-416-02714-4.
- Gabriele Teichmann (2001). "Pferdmenges, Robert". Neue Deutsche Biographie (in German). Vol. 20. Berlin: Duncker & Humblot. pp. 331–332. (full text online).
- Wilhelm Treue: Das Schicksal des Bankhauses Sal. Oppenheim jr. & Cie und seine Inhaber im Dritten Reich. Steiner, Wiesbaden 1983.
- Wilhelm Treue: Robert Pferdmenges (1880–1962). In: Kölner Unternehmer im 19. und 20. Jahrhundert. (Rheinisch-Westfälische Wirtschaftsbiographien, Band 13.) Aschendorff, Münster 1986, S. 203–222.
- Volker Woschnik, Jan Wucherpfenning: Robert Pferdmenges, Bankier in turbulenten Zeiten. In: Zeugen städtischer Vergangenheit. Band 24. Mönchengladbach 2006, ISBN 3-936824-24-X.
