= List of German Centre Party politicians =

A list of notable politicians of the German Centre Party:

== A ==
- Clemens Adams, de:Clemens Adams (Politiker, 1891)
- Heinrich Adelmann von Adelmannsfelden, de:Heinrich Adelmann von Adelmannsfelden
- Konrad Adenauer
- Peter Altmeier
- Rudolf Amelunxen
- Simon Angerpointner, de:Simon Angerpointner
- Engelbert-Maria von Arenberg, de:Engelbert-Maria von Arenberg
- Franz von Arenberg, de:Franz von Arenberg
- Heinrich von Aretin, de:Heinrich von Aretin
- Ludwig von Aretin, de:Ludwig von Aretin
- Peter Karl von Aretin, de:Peter Karl von Aretin
- Werner von Arnswaldt, de:Werner von Arnswaldt
- Karl Arnold
- Jacob Astor, de:Jacob Astor

== B ==
- Julius Bachem, de:Julius Bachem (Politiker, 1845)
- Karl Bachem, de:Karl Bachem
- Franz von Ballestrem
- Nikolaus von Ballestrem, de:Nikolaus von Ballestrem
- Valentin von Ballestrem, de:Valentin von Ballestrem
- Sebastian Bauer, Sebastian Bauer
- Luitpold Baumann, de:Luitpold Baumann
- Josef Baumhoff, de:Josef Baumhoff
- Jakob Bäurle, de:Jakob Bäurle
- Johann Leonhard Bayrhammer, de:Johann Leonhard Bayrhammer
- Carl Beck, de:Carl Beck (Politiker, 1869)
- Franz Beck, de:Franz Beck (Politiker, 1846)
- Anton Becker
- Johannes Becker, de:Johannes Becker (Politiker)
- Albert Beckmann, de:Albert Beckmann
- Johannes Bell
- Emil Belzer, de:Emil Belzer
- Hermann Joseph Bender, de:Hermann Joseph Bender
- Karl Bender, de:Karl Bender (Politiker)
- Karl Berberich, de:Karl Berberich
- Ulla Berghammer
- Theodor Bergmann
- Helmut Bertram
- Josef Beyerle, de:Josef Beyerle
- Konrad Beyerle
- Maximilian von Biegeleben, de:Maximilian von Biegeleben
- Franz Bielefeld, de:Franz Bielefeld (Politiker, 1880)
- Gustav Biesenbach, de:Gustav Biesenbach
- Cajetan von Bissingen-Nippenburg, de:Cajetan von Bissingen-Nippenburg
- Franz Bitter, de:Franz Bitter
- Wilhelm Bitter, de:Wilhelm Bitter
- Lorenz Blank, de:Lorenz Blank
- Johannes Blum, de:Johannes Blum
- Wilhelm Blum, de:Wilhelm Blum (Politiker, 1894)
- Lorenz Bock
- Fritz Bockius, de:Fritz Bockius (Politiker)
- Franz von und zu Bodman, de:Franz von und zu Bodman
- Julius von Bönninghausen, de:Julius von Bönninghausen
- Eugen Bolz
- Wilhelm Borgmann, de:Wilhelm Borgmann
- Franz Bornefeld-Ettmann, de:Franz Bornefeld-Ettmann
- Wilhelm Ritter von Borscht
- Franz Bracht
- Heinrich Brand, de:Heinrich Brand
- Maria Brand, de:Maria Brand
- Carl Brandenburg, de:Carl Brandenburg
- Gebhard Braun, de:Gebhard Braun
- Josef Braun
- Heinrich Brauns
- Gerhard von Breitenbach, de:Gerhard von Breitenbach
- Hermann von und zu Brenken, de:Hermann von und zu Brenken
- Otto von Brentano di Tremezzo, de:Otto von Brentano di Tremezzo
- Johann Adolf Breuer, de:Johann Adolf Breuer
- Johannes Brockmann
- Lambert Brockmann, de:Lambert Brockmann
- Wilhelm Broekmann, de:Wilhelm Broekmann
- Johann Brückl, de:Johann Brückl
- Philipp Brückner, de:Philipp Brückner
- Heinrich Brüning
- Lambert Bumiller, de:Lambert Bumiller
- Rudolf von Buol-Berenberg
- Eduard Burlage, de:Eduard Burlage
- Maximilian Burlage, de:Maximilian Burlage
- Wilhelm Busch, de:Wilhelm Busch (Politiker, 1867)

== C ==
- Peter Cahensly
- Hans von Chamier Glisczinski, de:Hans von Chamier Glisczinski
- Peter Chrysant, de:Peter Chrysant
- August Crone-Münzebrock, de:August Crone-Münzebrock

== D ==
- Gideon Dael von Köth-Wanscheid, de:Gideon Dael von Köth-Wanscheid
- Anton Dahlem, de:Anton Dahlem
- Balthasar von Daller
- Franz Hubertus von Dalwigk zu Lichtenfels, de:Franz Hubertus von Dalwigk zu Lichtenfels
- Georg Friedrich Dasbach, de:Georg Friedrich Dasbach
- Wilhelm Deist
- Anton von Dejanicz-Gliszczynski, de:Anton von Dejanicz-Gliszczynski
- Johannes Denis, de:Johannes Denis
- Friedrich Dessauer
- Gregor Determann, de:Gregor Determann
- Georg von Detten, de:Georg von Detten (Jurist)
- Hedwig Dransfeld
- Christian Dieden, de:Christian Dieden
- Helene Drießen, de:Helene Drießen
- Franz Driver, de:Franz Driver
- Marcell Driver, de:Marcell Driver (Politiker)
- Heinrich von Droste zu Hülshoff, de:Heinrich von Droste zu Hülshoff

== E ==
- Bernhard Eckholt, de:Bernhard Eckholt
- Wilhelm Elfes, de:Wilhelm Elfes
- Erich Emminger
- Carl Friedrich Engelen, de:Carl Friedrich Engelen
- Matthias Erzberger
- Jakob Euler, de:Jakob Euler
- Georg van Eyck, de:Georg van Eyck

== F ==
- Martin Faßbender, de:Martin Faßbender
- Oskar Farny
- Constantin Fehrenbach
- Adolf Fervers, de:Adolf Fervers
- Christoph Ernst Friedrich von Forcade de Biaix
- Karl Formell
- Franz Fortmann, de:Franz Fortmann
- Georg Arbogast von Franckenstein
- Johann Karl von Franckenstein (politician), de:Johann Karl von und zu Franckenstein (Politiker)
- Moritz von Franckenstein, de:Moritz von und zu Franckenstein
- Wilhelm Frank, de:Wilhelm Frank (Geistlicher)
- Josef Frenken
- Wilhelm Frerker, de:Wilhelm Frerker
- Karl von Freyberg, de:Karl von Freyberg (Politiker)
- Rudolph von Freyberg-Eisenberg, de:Rudolph von Freyberg-Eisenberg
- Aloys Fritzen, de:Aloys Fritzen
- Karl Fritzen, de:Karl Fritzen
- Heinrich Fröhle, de:Heinrich Fröhle
- Johannes Fuchs, de:Johannes Fuchs (Politiker, 1874)
- Johannes Fusangel, de:Johannes Fusangel

== G ==
- Ferdinand Heribert von Galen, de:Ferdinand Heribert von Galen
- Friedrich Mathias von Galen, de:Friedrich Mathias von Galen
- Otto Gerig, de:Otto Gerig
- Ernst Ludwig von Gerlach
- Heinrich Gerlach (politician), de:Heinrich Gerlach (Politiker)
- Liborius Gerstenberger, de:Liborius Gerstenberger
- Johannes Giesberts
- Hans Globke
- Joseph Glowatzki, de:Joseph Glowatzki
- Johann Baptist Gradl
- Eugen Graf, de:Eugen Graf
- Andreas von Grand-Ry, de:Andreas von Grand-Ry
- Maximilian von Gravenreuth, de:Maximilian von Gravenreuth
- Johannes Greber
- Adolf Gröber
- Franz Josef von Gruben
- Margarete Gröwel
- Theodor von Guérard

== H ==
- Albert Hackelsberger
- Wilhelm Hamacher, de:Wilhelm Hamacher
- Johann Anton von Harbuval-Chamaré-Stolz, de:Johann Anton von Harbuval-Chamaré-Stolz
- Alfred Hartmann, de:Alfred Hartmann (Manager)
- Franz Hartmann, de:Franz Hartmann (Politiker)
- Friedrich Hartmann, de:Friedrich Hartmann (Politiker, 1899)
- Gustav Hartmann, de:Gustav Hartmann (Politiker, 1875)
- Sibille Hartmann de:Sibille Hartmann
- Karl von Hartmann-Krey, de:Karl von Hartmann-Krey
- Konrad Hartong, de:Konrad Hartong
- Medard Hartrath, de:Medard Hartrath
- Heinrich Haslinde, de:Heinrich Haslinde
- Josef Haßkamp, de:Josef Haßkamp
- Elisabeth Hattemer
- Johannes Hauser, de:Johannes Hauser
- Caspar Haeusler, de:Caspar Haeusler
- Benedikt Hebel, de:Benedikt Hebel
- Clemens Heereman von Zuydwyck
- Fritz Hellwig
- Edwin Henckel von Donnersmarck
- Lazarus IV Henckel von Donnersmarck
- Johannes Henry, de:Johannes Henry
- Andreas Hermes
- Carl Herold
- Georg von Hertling
- Hermann Heukamp, de:Hermann Heukamp
- Josef Hilgers
- Werner Hilpert
- Heinrich Hirtsiefer, de:Heinrich Hirtsiefer
- Franz Hitze, de:Franz Hitze
- Hans Hoffmann
- Theodor Hofmann, de:Theodor Hofmann (Politiker, 1843)
- Anton Höfle, de:Anton Höfle
- Karl Holzamer
- Nikolaus Holzapfel, de:Nikolaus Holzapfel
- Ferdinand von Hompesch-Bollheim, de:Ferdinand von Hompesch-Bollheim (Diplomat)
- Albert Horn, de:Albert Horn
- Heinrich Horneck von Weinheim, de:Heinrich Horneck von Weinheim
- Clemens Horstmann, de:Clemens Horstmann
- Alfred Hubrich, de:Alfred Hubrich
- Alfred Hüffer, de:Alfred Hüffer
- Friedrich Hug, de:Friedrich Hug
- Franz Hülskamp, de:Franz Hülskamp
- Heinrich Humann, de:Heinrich Humann
- Eduard Hüsgen, de:Eduard Hüsgen

== I ==
- Martin Irl, de:Martin Irl

== J ==
- Eugen Jäger, de:Eugen Jäger
- Wilhelm Johnen
- Joseph Joos

== K ==
- Ludwig Kaas
- Jakob Kaiser
- Heinrich Kampschulte
- Rudolf Kanzler
- Georg Kassenbrock, de:Georg Kassenbrock
- Engelbert von Kerckerinck zur Borg, de:Engelbert von Kerckerinck zur Borg
- Peter Kerp, de:Peter Kerp (Politiker, 1872)
- Wilhelm Emmanuel von Ketteler
- Wilderich von Ketteler, de:Wilderich von Ketteler
- Johannes Baptist von Kiene, de:Johannes Baptist von Kiene
- Ferdinand Kirnberger, de:Ferdinand Kirnberger
- Theodor Kirsch, de:Theodor Kirsch (Politiker)
- Johann Klein
- Florian Klöckner, de:Florian Klöckner
- Florian Klose, de:Florian Klose
- Heinrich Köhler
- Anton Kohl, de:Anton Kohl (Politiker, 1851)
- Max Kolter, de:Max Kolter
- Georg Ignaz Komp
- Heinrich Konen
- Bernhard König, de:Bernhard König (Politiker, 1847)
- Bartholomäus Koßmann, de:Bartholomäus Koßmann
- Otto Krapp, de:Otto Krapp
- Cölestin Krebs, de:Cölestin Krebs
- Michael Krings, de:Michael Krings (Politiker)
- Kunibert Krix, de:Kunibert Krix
- Heinrich Krone
- Carl Joseph Kuckhoff, de:Carl Joseph Kuckhoff
- Bruno Kurowski
- Wilhelm Krupp, de:Wilhelm Krupp

== L ==
- Wilhelm van Laak, de:Wilhelm van Laak
- Karl von Lama, de:Karl von Lama
- Aloys Lammers, de:Aloys Lammers
- Clemens Lammers, de:Clemens Lammers
- Friedrich von Landsberg-Velen und Gemen, de:Friedrich von Landsberg-Velen und Gemen
- Ignatz von Landsberg-Velen und Steinfurt, de:Ignatz von Landsberg-Velen und Steinfurt
- Adolph Langer, de:Adolph Langer
- Franz Langewand
- Heinrich Laufenberg
- Franz Seraphim Lederer, de:Franz Seraphim Lederer
- Carl Leffers, de:Carl Leffers
- Heinrich Leffers, de:Heinrich Leffers
- Anton Lehemeir, de:Anton Lehemeir
- Johann Leicht, de:Johann Leicht
- Paul Lejeune-Jung
- Franz Xaver Lender, de:Franz Xaver Lender
- Franz Xaver Lerno, de:Franz Xaver Lerno
- Paul Letocha, de:Paul Letocha
- Bernhard Letterhaus
- Franz Leuninger
- Bernhard Lichtenberg
- Ernst Maria Lieber
- Joseph Lingens, de:Joseph Lingens
- Eugen von Loë, de:Eugen von Loë
- Friedrich Leopold von Loë, de:Friedrich Leopold von Loë
- Otto von Loë, de:Otto von Loë
- Charles, 6th Prince of Löwenstein-Wertheim-Rosenberg
- Hubertus, Prince of Löwenstein-Wertheim-Freudenberg
- Heinrich Lübke
- Carl Lucius, de:Carl Lucius
- August Lucius, de:August Lucius
- Hans Lukaschek
- Michael Lurz, de:Michael Lurz

== M ==
- Anton Franz von Magnis, de:Anton Franz von Magnis
- Paul Majunke
- Hermann von Mallinckrodt
- Konrad von Malsen-Waldkirch, de:Konrad von Malsen-Waldkirch
- Ludwig Marbe, de:Ludwig Marbe
- Eduard Marcour, de:Eduard Marcour
- Wilhelm Marx
- Franz von Matuschka, de:Franz von Matuschka
- Michael Graf von Matuschka
- Sebastian Matzinger, de:Sebastian Matzinger
- Michael Mayer, de:Michael Mayer (Politiker)
- Georg Meistermann
- Franz Meyer zu Holte, de:Franz Meyer zu Holte
- Josef Moritz, de:Josef Moritz
- Christoph Moufang
- Eduard Müller
- Erwin Müller
- Gebhard Müller
- Karl Müller
- Richard Müller, Richard Müller

== N ==
- Josef Nacken, de:Josef Nacken
- Joseph Martin Nathan, de:Joseph Martin Nathan
- Georg Nauheim, de:Georg Nauheim
- Agnes Neuhaus
- Caspar August Neuhaus, de:Caspar August Neuhaus
- Hugo Neumann, de:Hugo Neumann (Politiker)
- Hubert Ney

== O ==
- Anton Opfergelt, de:Anton Opfergelt
- Hans Georg von Oppersdorff, de:Hans Georg von Oppersdorff
- Christian Otte

== P ==
- Franz von Papen
- Jacob Rudolph Pauly, de:Jacob Rudolph Pauly
- Maximilian Pfeiffer, de:Maximilian Pfeiffer
- Joseph Pfleger, de:Joseph Pfleger (Politiker, 1872)
- Sigmund von Pfetten-Arnbach, de:Sigmund von Pfetten-Arnbach
- Heinrich Pickel
- Franz Seraph von Pichler, de:Franz Seraph von Pichler
- August Pieper, de:August Pieper
- Theodor Pingen, de:Theodor Pingen
- Friedrich von Poll, de:Friedrich von Poll
- August Ponschab, de:August Ponschab
- Karl Poppe, de:Karl Poppe (Politiker, 1863)
- Felix Porsch, de:Felix Porsch
- Friedrich von Praschma, de:Friedrich von Praschma
- Hans Praschma von Bilkau, de:Hans Praschma von Bilkau
- Friedrich Preuß, de:Friedrich Preuß
- Conrad von Preysing, de:Conrad von Preysing
- Kaspar von Preysing, de:Kaspar von Preysing
- Max von Preysing-Lichtenegg, de:Max von Preysing-Lichtenegg
- Ferdinand von Prondzynski, de:Ferdinand von Prondzynski (Politiker)
- Hermann Pünder

== Q ==
- Friedrich von Quadt-Wykradt-Isny, de:Friedrich von Quadt-Wykradt-Isny
- Otto von Quadt-Wykradt-Isny, de:Otto von Quadt-Wykradt-Isny

== R ==
- Balthasar Ranner, de:Balthasar Ranner
- Balthasar Rath, de:Balthasar Rath
- August Reichensperger
- Peter Reichensperger
- Maximilian Wilhelm Reichert, de:Maximilian Wilhelm Reichert
- Alfred Rembold, de:Alfred Rembold
- Gerhard Ribbeheger, de:Gerhard Ribbeheger
- Viktor Rintelen, de:Viktor Rintelen
- Franz Josef Ritter von Buß, de:Franz Josef Ritter von Buß
- Theodor Roeingh, de:Theodor Roeingh
- Hermann Roeren
- Heinrich Roth
- Joseph Roth

== S ==
- Alfred zu Salm-Reifferscheidt, de:Alfred zu Salm-Reifferscheidt
- Carl Theodor von und zu Sandizell, de:Carl Theodor von und zu Sandizell
- Wilhelm Sante, de:Wilhelm Sante
- Albert Sauer
- Karl Friedrich von Savigny
- Anton Sawatzki, de:Anton Sawatzki
- Franz Xaver Schädler, de:Franz Xaver Schädler
- Karl Scharnagl
- Friedrich Schaettgen, de:Friedrich Schaettgen
- Karl Matthias Schiffer, de:Karl Matthias Schiffer
- Peter Schlack, de:Peter Schlack (Politiker)
- Alois Schmid, de:Alois Schmid (Politiker)
- Joseph Anton Schmid, de:Joseph Anton Schmid
- Otto Schmidt (politician), de:Otto Schmidt (Politiker, 1842)
- Philipp Schmieder, de:Philipp Schmieder
- Hermann Schmidt, Hermann Schmidt
- Adam Joseph Schmitt, de:Adam Joseph Schmitt
- Joseph Schmitt
- Burghard Freiherr von Schorlemer-Alst
- Ferdinand von Schorlemer, de:Ferdinand von Schorlemer
- Friedrich von Schorlemer, Friedrich von Schorlemer
- Wilhelm von Schorlemer, de:Wilhelm von Schorlemer
- Josef Schrage
- Georg Schreiber
- Joseph Schuler, de:Joseph Schuler (Politiker, 1847)
- Julius Schüler, de:Julius Schüler
- Hugo Schulz
- Paul Schulz-Gahmen, de:Paul Schulz-Gahmen
- Wilhelm Schümmer, de:Wilhelm Schümmer
- Jean Albert Schwarz, de:Jean Albert Schwarz
- Wilhelm Schwarze, de:Wilhelm Schwarze
- Josef Sinn, de:Josef Sinn
- Hubert Sittart, de:Hubert Sittart
- Peter Spahn, Peter Spahn
- Karl Friedrich Speck
- Josef von Spee, de:Josef von Spee
- Leopold von Spee, de:Leopold von Spee (Geistlicher)
- Carl Spiecker, de:Carl Spiecker
- Edmund Spieß von Büllesheim, de:Edmund Spieß von Büllesheim
- Georg Stamm, de:Georg Stamm
- Adam Stegerwald
- Heinrich Steiger, de:Heinrich Steiger
- Franz Xaver Steindl, de:Franz Xaver Steindl
- Bernhard Karl Stephan, de:Bernhard Karl Stephan
- Adalbert zu Stolberg-Stolberg, de:Adalbert zu Stolberg-Stolberg
- Alfred zu Stolberg-Stolberg, de:Alfred zu Stolberg-Stolberg
- Cajus zu Stolberg-Stolberg, de:Cajus zu Stolberg-Stolberg
- Friedrich zu Stolberg-Stolberg, de:Friedrich zu Stolberg-Stolberg
- Hermann Joseph Graf zu Stolberg-Stolberg, de:Hermann Joseph Graf zu Stolberg-Stolberg
- Gerhard Stötzel, de:Gerhard Stötzel
- Fritz Stricker, de:Fritz Stricker
- Josef von Strombeck, de:Josef von Strombeck
- Franz Strzoda, de:Franz Strzoda
- Thomas Szczeponik
- Julius Szmula, de:Julius Szmula

== T ==
- Anton Tasch, de:Anton Tasch
- Christine Teusch
- Klemens von Thünefeld, de:Klemens von Thünefeld
- Carl Timmerman, de:Carl Timmerman
- August Trendel, de:August Trendel
- Karl Trimborn
- Gustav Trunk

== W ==
- Peter Wallenborn, de:Peter Wallenborn
- Augustin Warlo, de:August Warlo
- Brunislaus Warnke, de:Brunislaus Warnke
- Heinrich Wattendorff, de:Heinrich Wattendorff
- Friedrich Wilhelm Weber
- Helene Weber
- Josef Weeber, de:Josef Weber (Politiker, 1886)
- Karl Weber
- August Wegmann, August Wegmann
- Melchior Weißenhagen, de:Melchior Weißenhagen
- Josef Weißhaupt, de:Josef Weißhaupt
- Georg Wellstein, de:Georg Wellstein
- Franz Werthmann, de:Franz Werthmann
- Helene Wessel
- Franz Wieber, de:Franz Wieber
- Willibald Wiercinski-Keiser, de:Willibald Wiercinski-Keiser
- Bernhard Willenborg, de:Bernhard Willenborg
- Ludwig Windthorst
- Josef Wirmer
- Joseph Wirth
- Hermann de Witt, de:Hermann de Witt
- Josef Witzlsperger, de:Josef Witzlsperger
- Gerhard Woitzik, de:Gerhard Woitzik
- Carl Wolf, Carl Wolf
- August Wörle, de:August Wörle

== Z ==
- Hugo am Zehnhoff, de:Hugo am Zehnhoff
- Johann Anton Zehnter, de:Johann Anton Zehnter
- Angela Zigahl
- Elisabeth Zillken
