= Oberhausen – Wesel III =

Federal electoral district of Germany

116 Oberhausen – Wesel III
- Electoral district for the Bundestag
- Oberhausen – Wesel III in 2025
- State: North Rhine-Westphalia
- Population: 278,100 (2019)
- Electorate: 199,156 (2021)
- Major settlements: Oberhausen
- Area: 124.8 km^{2}

Current electoral district
- Created: 1949
- Party: SPD
- Member: Dirk Vöpel
- Elected: 2013, 2017, 2021, 2025

Oberhausen – Wesel III is an electoral constituency (German: Wahlkreis) represented in the Bundestag. It elects one member via first-past-the-post voting. Under the current constituency numbering system, it is designated as constituency 116. It is located in the Ruhr region of North Rhine-Westphalia, comprising the city of Oberhausen and a small part of the Wesel district.

Oberhausen – Wesel III was created for the inaugural 1949 federal election. Since 2021, it has been represented by Dirk Vöpel of the Social Democratic Party (SPD).

== Geography ==
Oberhausen – Wesel III is located in the Ruhr region of North Rhine-Westphalia. As of the 2021 federal election, it comprises the independent city of Oberhausen and the Dinslaken municipality from Wesel district.

== History ==
Oberhausen – Wesel III was created in 1949, then known as Oberhausen. It acquired its current name in the 2002 election. In the 1949 election, it was North Rhine-Westphalia constituency 28 in the numbering system. From 1953 through 1961, it was number 87. From 1965 through 1976, it was number 85. From 1980 through 1998, it was number 86. From 2002 through 2009, it was number 118. In the 2013 through 2021 elections, it was number 117. From the 2025 election, it has been number 116.

Originally, the constituency comprised only the city of Oberhausen. In the 2002 election, it acquired the municipality of Dinslaken from Wesel district.

| Election | No. | Name | Borders |
|---|---|---|---|
| 1949 | 28 | Oberhausen | Oberhausen city |
| 1953 | 87 | Oberhausen | Oberhausen city |
| 1957 | 87 | Oberhausen | Oberhausen city |
| 1961 | 87 | Oberhausen | Oberhausen city |
| 1965 | 85 | Oberhausen | Oberhausen city |
| 1969 | 85 | Oberhausen | Oberhausen city |
| 1972 | 85 | Oberhausen | Oberhausen city |
| 1976 | 85 | Oberhausen | Oberhausen city |
| 1980 | 86 | Oberhausen | Oberhausen city |
| 1983 | 86 | Oberhausen | Oberhausen city |
| 1987 | 86 | Oberhausen | Oberhausen city |
| 1990 | 86 | Oberhausen | Oberhausen city |
| 1994 | 86 | Oberhausen | Oberhausen city |
| 1998 | 86 | Oberhausen | Oberhausen city |
| 2002 | 118 | Oberhausen – Wesel III | Oberhausen city; Wesel district (only Dinslaken municipality) |
| 2005 | 118 | Oberhausen – Wesel III | Oberhausen city; Wesel district (only Dinslaken municipality) |
| 2009 | 118 | Oberhausen – Wesel III | Oberhausen city; Wesel district (only Dinslaken municipality) |
| 2013 | 117 | Oberhausen – Wesel III | Oberhausen city; Wesel district (only Dinslaken municipality) |
| 2017 | 117 | Oberhausen – Wesel III | Oberhausen city; Wesel district (only Dinslaken municipality) |
| 2021 | 117 | Oberhausen – Wesel III | Oberhausen city; Wesel district (only Dinslaken municipality) |
| 2025 | 116 | Oberhausen – Wesel III | Oberhausen city; Wesel district (only Dinslaken municipality) |

== Members ==
The constituency has been held by the Social Democratic Party (SPD) continuously since 1961. It was first represented by Martin Heix of the Christian Democratic Union (CDU) from 1949 to 1953. In the 1953 election, the CDU supported Centre Party candidate Johannes Brockmann, who became the first and last candidate of his party to win a constituency in the Bundestag. The alliance was dissolved before the 1957 election, and former member Heix regained the constituency for the CDU. He was re-elected in 1961. Luise Albertz of the SPD was elected in 1965 and served a single term. Fellow SPD member Erich Meinike then served until 1983. He was succeeded by Dieter Schanz from 1983 to 1998, followed by Wolfgang Grotthaus from 2002 to 2009. Michael Groschek was representative for a single term from 2009 to 2013. Dirk Vöpel was elected in 2013, and re-elected in 2017, 2021, and 2025.

| Election | Member | Party | % |
|---|---|---|---|
| 1949 | Martin Heix | CDU | 29.0 |
| 1953 | Johannes Brockmann | ZP | 47.2 |
| 1957 | Martin Heix | CDU | 54.3 |
| 1961 | Martin Heix | CDU | 45.4 |
| 1965 | Luise Albertz | SPD | 52.6 |
| 1969 | Erich Meinike | SPD | 54.0 |
| 1972 | Erich Meinike | SPD | 62.3 |
| 1976 | Erich Meinike | SPD | 58.8 |
| 1980 | Erich Meinike | SPD | 59.9 |
| 1983 | Dieter Schanz | SPD | 57.5 |
| 1987 | Dieter Schanz | SPD | 59.1 |
| 1990 | Dieter Schanz | SPD | 55.5 |
| 1994 | Dieter Schanz | SPD | 59.3 |
| 1998 | Wolfgang Grotthaus | SPD | 65.3 |
| 2002 | Wolfgang Grotthaus | SPD | 61.8 |
| 2005 | Wolfgang Grotthaus | SPD | 58.2 |
| 2009 | Michael Groschek | SPD | 44.6 |
| 2013 | Dirk Vöpel | SPD | 45.1 |
| 2017 | Dirk Vöpel | SPD | 38.5 |
| 2021 | Dirk Vöpel | SPD | 38.8 |
| 2025 | Dirk Vöpel | SPD | 31.4 |

== Election results ==
=== 2025 election ===
Federal election (2025): Oberhausen – Wesel III
| Notes: | Blue background denotes the winner of the electorate vote. Pink background denotes a candidate elected from their party list. Yellow background denotes an electorate win by a list member, or other incumbent. A ✓ or ✗ denotes status of any incumbent, win or lose respectively. | | | | | | |
| Party | Candidate | Votes | % | ±% | Party votes | % | ±% |
|---|---|---|---|---|---|---|---|
| SPD | ✓ Dirk Vöpel | 48,434 | 31.4 | ▼7.4 | 38,967 | 25.2 | ▼11.7 |
| CDU | Simone Stehr | 41,519 | 26.9 | ▲4.5 | 38,607 | 24.9 | ▲3.6 |
| AfD | Uwe Lindackers | 32,461 | 21.0 | ▲11.6 | 31,565 | 20.4 | ▲11.3 |
| Greens | Franziska Krumwieder-Steiner | 12,638 | 8.2 | ▼3.8 | 13,759 | 8.9 | ▼3.6 |
| Left | Sascha H. Wagner | 12,062 | 7.8 | ▲4.4 | 12,770 | 8.2 | ▲4.4 |
| BSW | | | | | 7,331 | 4.7 | |
| FDP | Roman Müller-Böhm | 4,456 | 2.9 | ▼4.2 | 5,245 | 3.4 | ▼6.0 |
| Tierschutzpartei | | | | | 2,566 | 1.7 | ▼0.1 |
| Team Todenhöfer | | | | | 564 | 0.4 | ▼0.4 |
| PARTEI | | | | ▼4.5 | 1,082 | 0.7 | ▼0.8 |
| Volt | | | | | 734 | 0.5 | ▲0.2 |
| MLPD | Julia Scheller | 641 | 0.4 | ▲0.3 | 99 | 0.1 | 0.0 |
| FW | | | | ▼1.0 | 561 | 0.4 | ▼0.2 |
| PdF | | | | | 304 | 0.2 | ▲0.2 |
| dieBasis | | | | ▼1.0 | 273 | 0.2 | ▼0.6 |
| BD | | | | | 230 | 0.1 | |
| Values | | | | | 79 | 0.1 | |
| V-Partei3 | | | | | 73 | 0.0 | |
| Pirates | | | | | | | ▼0.4 |
| Gesundheitsforschung | | | | | | | ▼0.1 |
| ÖDP | | | | | | | ▼0.1 |
| Humanists | | | | | | | ▼0.1 |
| Bündnis C | | | | | | | ▼0. |
| SGP | | | | | | 0.0 | 0.0 |
| Informal votes | | 1,507 | | | 1,005 | | |
| Total valid votes | | 154,307 | | | 154,809 | | |
| Turnout | | 155,814 | 80.4 | ▲7.4 | | | |
| SPD hold | Majority | 6,915 | 4.5 | | | | |

=== 2021 election ===
Federal election (2021): Oberhausen – Wesel III
| Notes: | Blue background denotes the winner of the electorate vote. Pink background denotes a candidate elected from their party list. Yellow background denotes an electorate win by a list member, or other incumbent. A ✓ or ✗ denotes status of any incumbent, win or lose respectively. | | | | | | |
| Party | Candidate | Votes | % | ±% | Party votes | % | ±% |
|---|---|---|---|---|---|---|---|
| SPD | ✓ Dirk Vöpel | 55,790 | 38.8 | ▲0.3 | 53,034 | 36.8 | ▲3.8 |
| CDU | Marie-Luise Dött | 32,277 | 22.5 | ▼6.6 | 30,770 | 21.4 | ▼4.9 |
| Greens | Stefanie Weyland | 17,171 | 11.9 | ▲6.3 | 17,945 | 12.5 | ▲6.9 |
| AfD | Olaf Wilhelm | 13,601 | 9.5 | ▼2.8 | 13,099 | 9.1 | ▼3.4 |
| FDP | Roman Müller-Böhm | 10,132 | 7.0 | ▲0.7 | 13,573 | 9.4 | ▼0.6 |
| PARTEI | Hans-Joachim Sommers | 6,464 | 4.5 | | 2,199 | 1.5 | ▲0.7 |
| Left | Sascha H. Wagner | 4,908 | 3.4 | ▼4.2 | 5,613 | 3.9 | ▼4.4 |
| Tierschutzpartei | | | | | 2,473 | 1.7 | ▲0.8 |
| Team Todenhöfer | | | | | 1,113 | 0.8 | |
| dieBasis | Ralf Wosnek | 1,434 | 1.0 | | 1,064 | 0.7 | |
| FW | Guido Horn | 1,378 | 1.0 | | 847 | 0.6 | ▲0.3 |
| Pirates | | | | | 515 | 0.4 | ▼0.2 |
| Volt | | | | | 357 | 0.2 | |
| LIEBE | | | | | 209 | 0.1 | |
| Gesundheitsforschung | | | | | 201 | 0.1 | 0.0 |
| NPD | | | | | 182 | 0.1 | ▼0.2 |
| LfK | | | | | 167 | 0.1 | |
| V-Partei3 | Simon Thomas | 454 | 0.3 | | 154 | 0.1 | 0.0 |
| ÖDP | | | | | 100 | 0.1 | 0.0 |
| Humanists | | | | | 87 | 0.1 | 0.0 |
| Bündnis C | | | | | 74 | 0.1 | |
| MLPD | Erhan Aktürk | 145 | 0.1 | ▼0.1 | 71 | 0.0 | 0.0 |
| du. | | | | | 54 | 0.0 | |
| PdF | | | | | 45 | 0.0 | |
| DKP | | | | | 28 | 0.0 | 0.0 |
| LKR | | | | | 22 | 0.0 | |
| SGP | | | | | 20 | 0.0 | 0.0 |
| Informal votes | | 1,478 | | | 1,216 | | |
| Total valid votes | | 143,754 | | | 144,016 | | |
| Turnout | | 145,232 | 72.9 | ▼0.5 | | | |
| SPD hold | Majority | 23,513 | 16.3 | ▲6.9 | | | |

=== 2017 election ===
Federal election (2017): Oberhausen – Wesel III
| Notes: | Blue background denotes the winner of the electorate vote. Pink background denotes a candidate elected from their party list. Yellow background denotes an electorate win by a list member, or other incumbent. A ✓ or ✗ denotes status of any incumbent, win or lose respectively. | | | | | | |
| Party | Candidate | Votes | % | ±% | Party votes | % | ±% |
|---|---|---|---|---|---|---|---|
| SPD | ✓ Dirk Vöpel | 56,987 | 38.5 | ▼6.6 | 49,165 | 33.0 | ▼8.3 |
| CDU | Marie-Luise Dött | 43,077 | 29.1 | ▼3.2 | 39,085 | 26.3 | ▼3.8 |
| AfD | Uwe Kamann | 18,197 | 12.3 | | 18,560 | 12.5 | ▲8.3 |
| Left | Niema Movassat | 11,331 | 7.6 | ▲0.3 | 12,373 | 8.3 | ▲0.3 |
| FDP | Roman Müller-Böhm | 9,357 | 6.3 | ▲4.7 | 14,890 | 10.0 | ▲6.7 |
| Greens | Patrick Voss | 8,349 | 5.6 | ▼2.2 | 8,228 | 5.5 | ▼1.1 |
| Tierschutzpartei | | | | | 1,422 | 1.0 | |
| PARTEI | | | | | 1,284 | 0.9 | ▲0.5 |
| AD-DEMOKRATEN | | | | | 942 | 0.6 | |
| Pirates | | | | | 795 | 0.5 | ▼1.9 |
| DIE VIOLETTEN | Karin Schäfer | 554 | 0.4 | | | | |
| NPD | | | | | 508 | 0.3 | ▼1.7 |
| FW | | | | | 362 | 0.2 | ▲0.1 |
| Volksabstimmung | | | | | 166 | 0.1 | ▼0.1 |
| V-Partei³ | | | | | 150 | 0.1 | |
| MLPD | Wolf Dieter Rochlitz | 269 | 0.2 | | 146 | 0.1 | 0.0 |
| Gesundheitsforschung | | | | | 143 | 0.1 | |
| ÖDP | | | | | 133 | 0.1 | 0.0 |
| DiB | | | | | 131 | 0.1 | |
| BGE | | | | | 122 | 0.1 | |
| DM | | | | | 115 | 0.1 | |
| Die Humanisten | | | | | 86 | 0.1 | |
| DKP | | | | | 31 | 0.0 | |
| SGP | | | | | 24 | 0.0 | 0.0 |
| Informal votes | | 2,191 | | | 1,451 | | |
| Total valid votes | | 148,121 | | | 148,861 | | |
| Turnout | | 150,312 | 73.4 | ▲2.7 | | | |
| SPD hold | Majority | 13,910 | 9.4 | ▼3.4 | | | |

=== 2013 election ===
Federal election (2013): Oberhausen – Wesel III
| Notes: | Blue background denotes the winner of the electorate vote. Pink background denotes a candidate elected from their party list. Yellow background denotes an electorate win by a list member, or other incumbent. A ✓ or ✗ denotes status of any incumbent, win or lose respectively. | | | | | | |
| Party | Candidate | Votes | % | ±% | Party votes | % | ±% |
|---|---|---|---|---|---|---|---|
| SPD | Dirk Vöpel | 65,442 | 45.1 | ▲0.5 | 60,222 | 41.3 | ▲1.9 |
| CDU | Marie-Luise Dött | 46,889 | 32.3 | ▲4.9 | 43,882 | 30.1 | ▲5.7 |
| Greens | Bärbel Höhn | 11,396 | 7.8 | ▼2.3 | 9,604 | 6.6 | ▼2.5 |
| Left | Niema Movassat | 10,627 | 7.3 | ▼2.3 | 11,732 | 8.0 | ▼3.1 |
| AfD | | | | | 6,145 | 4.2 | |
| Pirates | Andreas Ronig | 4,440 | 3.1 | | 3,579 | 2.5 | ▲0.9 |
| NPD | Timo Diemer | 4,001 | 2.8 | ▲0.9 | 2,938 | 2.0 | ▲0.6 |
| FDP | Dorothea Dresenkamp | 2,415 | 1.7 | ▼4.7 | 4,802 | 3.3 | ▼7.0 |
| PRO | | | | | 641 | 0.4 | |
| PARTEI | | | | | 525 | 0.4 | |
| Volksabstimmung | | | | | 293 | 0.2 | ▲0.1 |
| REP | | | | | 234 | 0.2 | ▼0.2 |
| FW | | | | | 225 | 0.2 | |
| Nichtwahler | | | | | 168 | 0.1 | |
| ÖDP | | | | | 167 | 0.1 | 0.0 |
| BIG | | | | | 155 | 0.1 | |
| Party of Reason | | | | | 116 | 0.1 | |
| RRP | | | | | 104 | 0.1 | ▼0.1 |
| MLPD | | | | | 92 | 0.1 | 0.0 |
| BüSo | | | | | 49 | 0.0 | 0.0 |
| Die Rechte | | | | | 47 | 0.0 | |
| PSG | | | | | 47 | 0.0 | 0.0 |
| Informal votes | | 2,469 | | | 1,912 | | |
| Total valid votes | | 145,210 | | | 145,767 | | |
| Turnout | | 147,679 | 70.7 | ▲0.9 | | | |
| SPD hold | Majority | 18,553 | 12.8 | ▼4.4 | | | |

=== 2009 election ===
Federal election (2009): Oberhausen – Wesel III
| Notes: | Blue background denotes the winner of the electorate vote. Pink background denotes a candidate elected from their party list. Yellow background denotes an electorate win by a list member, or other incumbent. A ✓ or ✗ denotes status of any incumbent, win or lose respectively. | | | | | | |
| Party | Candidate | Votes | % | ±% | Party votes | % | ±% |
|---|---|---|---|---|---|---|---|
| SPD | Michael Groschek | 65,189 | 44.6 | ▼13.6 | 57,689 | 39.4 | ▼14.5 |
| CDU | Marie-Luise Dött | 40,001 | 27.4 | ▲1.0 | 35,712 | 24.4 | ▲1.1 |
| Greens | Bärbel Höhn | 14,772 | 10.1 | ▲4.2 | 13,352 | 9.1 | ▲2.2 |
| Left | Niema Movassat | 14,008 | 9.6 | ▲4.0 | 16,311 | 11.1 | ▲4.5 |
| FDP | Gerald Schädlich | 9,231 | 6.3 | ▲3.7 | 15,049 | 10.3 | ▲4.0 |
| Pirates | | | | | 2,325 | 1.6 | |
| NPD | Wolfgang Georg Duda | 2,643 | 1.8 | ▲0.6 | 2,011 | 1.4 | ▲0.4 |
| Tierschutzpartei | | | | | 1,109 | 0.8 | ▲0.2 |
| FAMILIE | | | | | 740 | 0.5 | ▼0.1 |
| RENTNER | | | | | 667 | 0.5 | |
| REP | | | | | 480 | 0.3 | 0.0 |
| RRP | | | | | 211 | 0.1 | |
| DVU | | | | | 135 | 0.1 | |
| Volksabstimmung | | | | | 119 | 0.1 | 0.0 |
| MLPD | Reinhardt Meyer | 282 | 0.2 | 0.0 | 118 | 0.1 | 0.0 |
| ÖDP | | | | | 106 | 0.1 | |
| Centre | | | | | 93 | 0.1 | 0.0 |
| BüSo | | | | | 43 | 0.0 | 0.0 |
| PSG | | | | | 35 | 0.0 | 0.0 |
| Informal votes | | 1,982 | | | 1,803 | | |
| Total valid votes | | 146,126 | | | 146,305 | | |
| Turnout | | 148,108 | 69.8 | ▼8.1 | | | |
| SPD hold | Majority | 25,188 | 17.2 | ▼14.6 | | | |

=== 2005 election ===
Federal election (2005): Oberhausen – Wesel III
| Notes: | Blue background denotes the winner of the electorate vote. Pink background denotes a candidate elected from their party list. Yellow background denotes an electorate win by a list member, or other incumbent. A ✓ or ✗ denotes status of any incumbent, win or lose respectively. | | | | | | |
| Party | Candidate | Votes | % | ±% | Party votes | % | ±% |
|---|---|---|---|---|---|---|---|
| SPD | ✓ Wolfgang Grotthaus | 95,580 | 58.2 | ▼3.6 | 88,560 | 53.9 | ▼3.0 |
| CDU | Marie-Luise Dött | 43,411 | 26.4 | ▲0.9 | 38,228 | 23.3 | ▼0.48 |
| FDP | Gerd Arlt | 34,443 | 2.6 | ▼2.6 | 10,362 | 6.3 | ▼0.7 |
| Greens | Bärbel Höhn | 9,668 | 5.9 | ▲0.7 | 11,350 | 6.9 | ▼0.9 |
| Left | Dirk Paasch | 9,108 | 5.5 | ▲4.0 | 10,843 | 6.6 | ▲5.2 |
| NPD | Klaus-Dieter Brominski | 1,905 | 1.2 | | 1,656 | 1.0 | ▲0.6 |
| Tierschutzpartei | | | | | 848 | 0.5 | ▲0.1 |
| Familie | | | | | 648 | 0.4 | ▲0.2 |
| GRAUEN | | | | | 620 | 0.4 | ▲0.1 |
| REP | | | | | 597 | 0.4 | |
| MLPD | Reinhardt Meyer | 274 | 0.2 | | 180 | 0.1 | |
| From Now on... Democracy Through Referendum | | | | | 114 | 0.1 | |
| PBC | | | | | 89 | 0.1 | |
| Socialist Equality Party | | | | | 79 | 0.0 | |
| Centre | | | | | 60 | 0.0 | |
| BüSo | | | | | 40 | 0.0 | 0.0 |
| Informal votes | | 2,328 | | | 2,344 | | |
| Total valid votes | | 164,290 | | | 164,274 | | |
| Turnout | | 166,618 | 77.9 | ▼0.6 | | | |
| SPD hold | Majority | 52,169 | 31.8 | | | | |
