= Johannes Brockmann =

German politician (1888–1975)

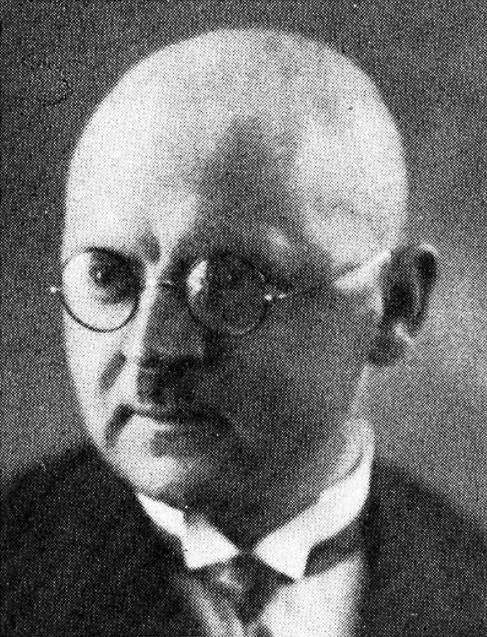
Brockmann's official Landtag portrait, 1933

Johannes Brockmann (pronounced [ˈbʁoːkman]; 17 July 1888 – 14 December 1975) was a German politician who was a member of the Centre Party. A devout Catholic, political pragmatist, and critic of Nazism, he played a major role in reconstituting the party after it had been effectively forced to dissolve by the Nazi government. Brockmann served as the Centre Party's federal chairman, and he was a member of the Bundestag from 1953 to 1957.

== Life and career ==
Brockmann was born on 17 July 1888 in Paderborn, the fourth of ten children in a devout Catholic family. One of his brothers, Hermann Brockmann, went on to serve in the Landtag as a member of the Social Democratic Party.

After completing his training at the Paderborn teachers' seminar, Brockmann taught from 1911 at a Volksschule near Bocholt. In 1913, he transferred to the school in Rinkerode, where he became headmaster in 1930. During the Weimar Republic, he served as chairman of the Association of Catholic Young Teachers (Katholischer Junglehrerverband). He was dismissed from the school service by the Nazi Party in 1933.

Following the 20 July plot in 1944 to assassinate Adolf Hitler, Brockmann was imprisoned for two months due to his contacts with figures in the Catholic resistance to Nazi Germany. In 1945, Brockmann was recalled to state service, initially serving again as headmaster in Rinkerode and subsequently becoming general advisor for education (Generalreferent Kultus) in the Westphalian provincial administration.

== Party politics ==
Brockmann had been a member of the Centre Party since 1919 and soon became chairman of the Westphalian branch of the Windthorstbund, the youth wing of the party. From 1946 to 1948, he served his first term as federal chairman of the Centre Party. In 1947, he also became its Westphalian state chairman. Following the departure of Helene Wessel, he served initially as acting chairman, and from 9 March 1953, he was re-elected as federal chairman of the party. In 1969, he stepped down and was succeeded by Gerhard Ribbeheger.

== Parliamentary service ==
Brockmann's official Bundestag portrait, 1953

From 27 April 1926 to 1933, Brockmann was a member of the Prussian Landtag for the Centre Party.

After 1945, Brockmann served on the municipal council of Rinkerode and, until 1961, also on the district assembly (Kreistag). Under Oberpräsident Rudolf Amelunxen, prior to the establishment of the state of North Rhine-Westphalia, Brockmann headed the general office for education in the presidency of the province of Westphalia. From 1946 to 1958, he was a member of the Landtag of North Rhine-Westphalia, where he served as parliamentary group leader of the Centre Party. In 1948 and 1949, Brockmann was a member of the Parliamentary Council, the body that drafted the West German Basic Law, also leading the Centre Party parliamentary group there. Although elected to the Bundestag in 1949, Brockmann declined the mandate. In 1953, he was elected to the Bundestag for one legislative term, representing the Oberhausen electoral district.

== Death ==
Brockmann died at the age of 87 on 14 December 1975 in Münster-Hiltrup, and he was then buried in Paderborn.

== See also ==
- 1950 North Rhine-Westphalia state election
- 1953 West German federal election
- List of German Centre Party politicians
