= Berghammer =

Berghammer is a German surname. Notable people with the surname include:

- Franz Berghammer (1913–1944), Austrian handball player
- Marty Berghammer (1888–1957), American baseball player
- Rudolf Berghammer (born 1952), German mathematician and computer scientist
- Ulla Berghammer (1887–1957), German politician
