= Elisabeth Hattemer =

German politician (1870–1948)

Elisabeth "Else" Hattemer (born Elisabeth Hemmes: 9 January 1870 – 19 December 1948) was a politician (Centre Party) and, between 1919 and 1933, a member of the regional parliament ("Landtag") in the People's State of Hesse ("Volksstaat Hessen"), as Hesse-Darmstadt became known between 1918 and 1945. Throughout this period she was the party's only female deputy in the assembly.

== Life ==
=== Provenance and early years ===
Elisabeth Hemmes was born in Bensheim, then as now a prosperous mid-sized town located halfway between Darmstadt and Mannheim. Wilhelm Hemmes (1840–1925), her father, was a teacher who later achieved notability as the director of the Royal Deaf-Mute Institute ("Bensheimer Großherzoglichen Taubstummenanstalt") and as the author of a pioneering six-year teaching programme for the deaf-mute. Despite her father's pedagogic career, when his daughter also became a teacher, she did so only in the teeth of her father's opposition. She taught English and French at secondary schools in Vallendar and Cologne.

When she was 28 Else Hemmes married Karl Hattemer (1869–1913), one year her senior and, like her, a secondary school teacher. His family came, originally, from Gau-Algesheim (near Mainz). By the time of her husband's relatively early death the marriage would have produced four recorded children. In 1901 the couple relocated to Darmstadt where Karl Hattemer taught at the Neue Gymnasium (secondary school - subsequently subsumed into the "Ludwig-Georg Gymnasium". After she was widowed, in 1913, Elisabeth Hattemer increased her involvement in social and political matters. Her commitments included work for the "City Poverty and Welfare Operation" ("Städtische Armen- und Fürsorgedeputation"), the "Darmstadt Catholic Girls Protection League" ("Katholischer Mädchenschutzverein Darmstadt") and in the "Catholic Women's Association".

=== Politics ===
Elisabeth Hattemer was a member of the Centre Party (Hessen). Military defeat in 1918 had been followed by a wave of revolutions across the country during 1918/19. The Grand duke, after refusing to abdicate, had been forced from his throne, and by 1919 the Grand Duchy of Hesse had become the People's State of Hesse (Volksstaat Hessen). The old bicameral legislature had been replaced by the unicameral "Landtag", its franchise broader and the voting systems more direct than before. Following the first election, held on 26 January 1919, the Centre Party vote share entitled it to 13 of the 70 seats. There were few women. However, Elisabeth Hattemer was elected to the assembly, after which she continued to be elected in successive elections up to and including the 1932 election. She was one of only five members with this record of continuity. During the Weimar years she was one of just twelve female members in the chamber, and the only woman sitting as a member for the Centre party. Her particular focus was on girls' education and social welfare, also backing measures designed to help the socially disadvantaged.

=== Beyond politics ===
A record from the Darmstadt branch of the Caritas (Catholic charity organisation) records that from March 1925 the Centre Party Landtag member, Mrs Elizabeth Hattemer, was the head of the Caritas secretariat set up, initially, on land belonging to the priory of St. Ludwig, (and which relocated to an address along the Hügelstraße in 1926). She continued to play a prominent co-ordination role within the city's Caritas organisation for many years, although in 1937 the leadership function was taken over by Valentin Degen. Later she became a member of the Caritas board for the diocese. Another focus of her work was the Darmstadt regional theatre, of which she was a member of the supervisory board ("Verwaltungsbeirat"), and which was at this time enjoying a strong reputation both for staging classical productions and for some modern pieces that confronted contemporary morality and preconceptions.

Till 1939, when she moved house, Elisabeth Hattemer was living at an address in the Hermann Street ("Hermannstraße 43") which also accommodated the Darmstadt Caritas secretariat, the Children's Welfare office of the Darmstadt branch of the Catholic Women's Association, and its children's day-care center. Shortly before the outbreak of war the Nazi authorities, who always nurtured suspicions of any community involvement by "proxies" for the Roman Catholic Church, closed down the day-care center. A few years later, the failed assassination attempt against Hitler in July 1944 failed in its primary objective, but was highly effective in unnerving the government, which promptly dusted down a long list of people who had been politically active as non-Nazis before 1933. It turned out that many names on the list belonged to people who had fled abroad or died. Nevertheless, on the night of 22/23 August mass arrests took place across Germany. Elisabeth Hattemer's name was on the list and an attempt was made to arrest her. However, possibly aware of what was about to happen, she had taken the opportunity to move to live with her son in nearby Viernheim, which was sufficient to preserve her from arrest. After the war ended, in 1945, she continued to support her son with his youth work, and renewed her involvement with the Catholic Women's Association.
