= Kurt Adams (politician) =

German politician

- Born: 15 December 1889; Hamburg, Germany
- Died: 7 October 1944 (aged 54); Buchenwald concentration camp, Thuringia, Germany
- Occupations: Politician; Educationalist
- Political party: SPD

Kurt Adams (15 December 1889 – 7 October 1944) was a Hamburg SPD politician and an educationalist.

Following the failed assassination attempt on Adolf Hitler in July 1944 Kurt Adams was one of several thousand high-profile non-Nazis arrested and detained by the government during August. He died a couple of months later at the Buchenwald concentration camp.

== Life ==
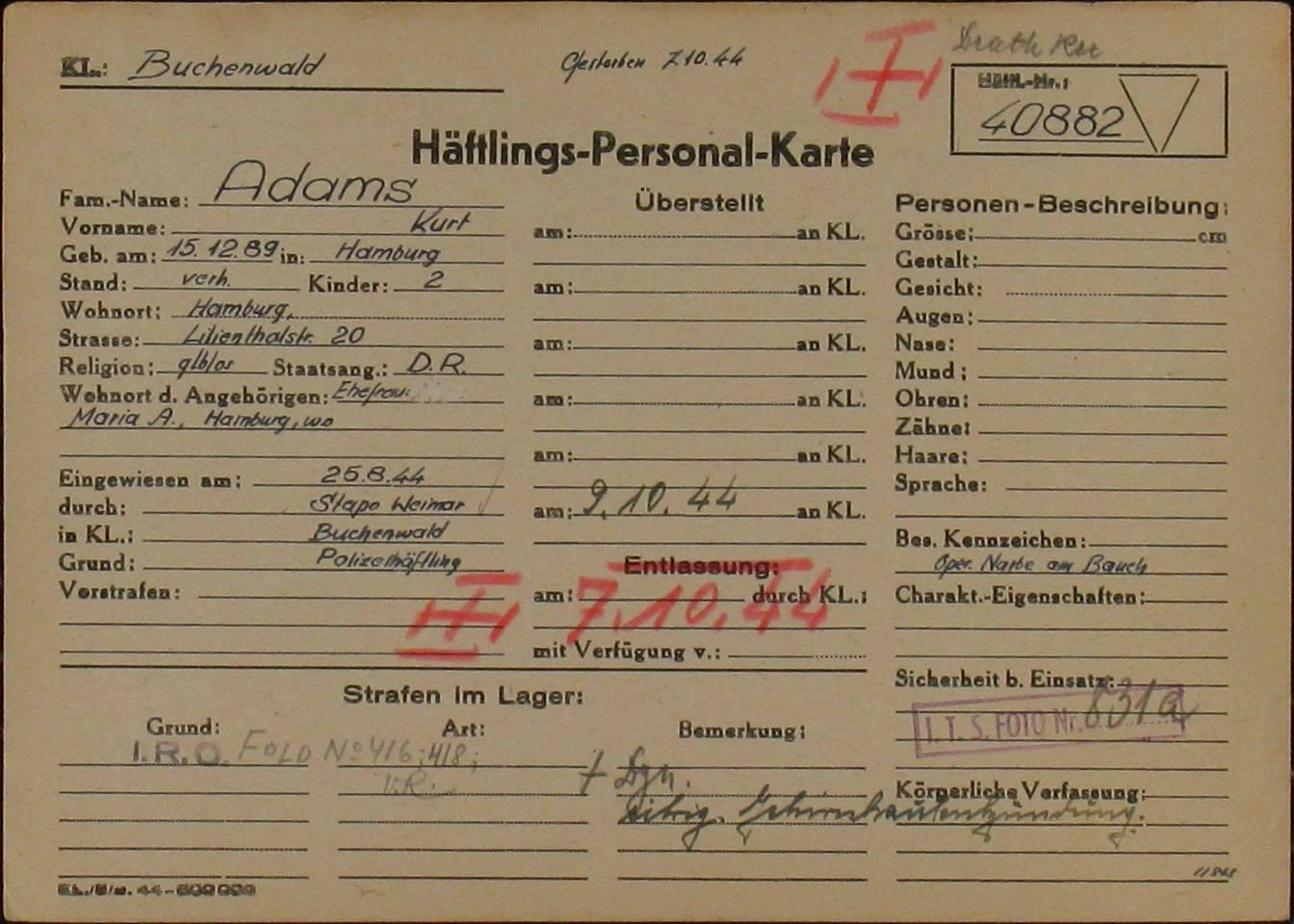
Registration card of Kurt Adams as a prisoner at Buchenwald Nazi Concentration Camp

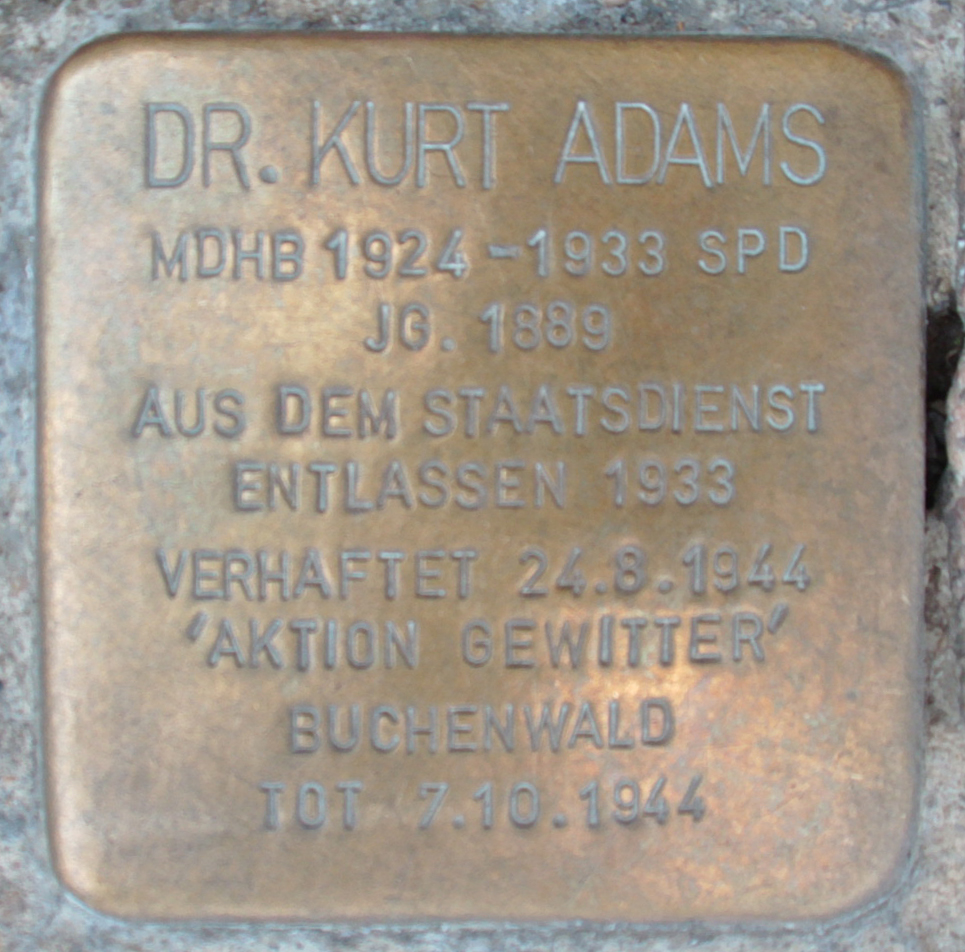
Stolperstein at Rathausmarkt 1 of Dr. Kurt Adam in Hamburg-Altstadt, Germany

Kurt Adams was born at the tail end of 1889. His father was a merchant. He attended two secondary schools, first the "Vor dem Lübeckertor Realschule" and then the "auf der Uhlenhorst Realschule", before progressing to university. His university level studies took him to universities in Göttingen, Freiburg, the Humboldt (Berlin) and Greifswald. Subjects studied were German, French and History. He received his doctorate in 1912 for a dissertation entitled "Otto Ludwig´s Theories on Drama". The next year he took a job with the Hamburg City Schools Service, also teaching at the Albrecht-Thaer School, and became committed to the cause of education reform. Adams remained an energetic member of the city Schools Service until 1929. In October 1928 he took over headship of the Hamburg People's Academy from Rudolf Roß.

Kurt Adams joined the Social Democratic Party (SPD) while still a student. Between 1924 and 1933 he was a member of the Hamburg Parliament. More than once he stood for election to the national Reichstag, but his name was towards the bottom of the SPD party list and he was never elected.

He took a particular interest in education and was a member of various education related committees and groupings including the "Working Group of SPD Teachers" ("Arbeitsgemeinschaft sozialdemokratischer Lehrer") of which he was chairman locally, becoming known as one of the Hamburg SPD's leading education experts. He also headed up the Hamburg "Kinderfreundebewegung" (literally "Children's friends' movement").

== Politics ==
Following Régime change in January 1933, the new government lost little time in moving towards one-party government. Adams was threatened with the loss of his position in the Schools Service as a result of the so-called Law for the Restoration of the Professional Civil Service, passed in April 1933. He therefore announced his resignation from the SPD to the local party leadership, but he nevertheless lost his job on 232 June 1933. He faced a call from the newly appointed Hamburg Nazi Gauleiter, Karl Kaufmann to renounce his political convictions, but did not do so. Kurt Adams was succeeded as head of the Hamburg People's Academy by Heinrich Haselmayer.

After losing his public service employment Adam worked briefly for a cinema news-sheet, before taking on a small coffee distribution business in Hamburg's Nikolaifleet (in the city's old harbour quarter). The coffee business brought him into contact with a number of politically like-minded individuals, and his little trading office quickly became a Hamburg meeting point for SPD and Communists, whose party activities had become illegal in 1933. Adams was able to help fellow victims of Nazi persecution, including Hermann Hoefer and Rudolf Klug. In addition to coffee, the little business became a distribution point for illegal political leaflets, some of which Adams himself distributed, using his bicycle.

== Death ==
On 20 July 1944 an assassination attempt was made against Adolf Hitler. The dictator survived, but his regime had already prepared a list of several thousand names, to be used in the event of an escalation in political tension on the home front, and the name of Kurt Adams was on it. In the context of the wave of arrests known as "Aktion Gitter", on 24 August 1944 Kurt Adams was arrested at Greiz, where he was staying with relatives while recuperating from a serious operation earlier in the year. He was taken to Gera nearby. Four days later he was taken to the Buchenwald concentration camp, which was already overcrowded, with approximately 84,000 detainees. On his arrival he was immediately recognized by other inmates, whose reactions to his arrival identified him to the guards. He was separated out and placed in a sub-camp where the condition of the accommodation, food and hygiene were massively worse than in the main camp. He quickly weakened and became ill: from later reports provided by fellow detainees he appears to have caught pneumonia, and was taken, on 15 September 1944, to the camp hospital where he received treatment and his condition may have improved. However, he was soon discharged back to the camp. The family received two more letters from him, in the second of which, dated 26 September 1944, he wrote that he was getting better. However, on 5 October 1944 he lost consciousness, and he died, probably of meningitis, on 7 October 1944.

== Recognition ==
- Kurt Adams Square ("Kurt-Adams-Platz") in Hamburg's Lohbrügge quarter was named to commemorate and honour Adams
- In the German Democratic Republic, in 1958, a postage stamp was issued featuring a portrait of Kurt Adams.
- On 8 June 2012, a series of individual stolpersteine memorial tablets were unveiled in front of the Hamburg City Hall for murdered members of the Hamburg Parliament. One of these was for Kurt Adams. Another tablet, similar in style but more succinct in content, is set at the entrance to Terminal 2 of the city airport.
