= Dirk Vöpel =

German politician

Member of the Bundestag
- Incumbent
- Assumed office 2013

Personal details
- Born: 29 May 1971 (age 54) Oberhausen, West Germany (now Germany)
- Party: SPD

Dirk Vöpel (born 29 May 1971) is a German politician of the Social Democratic Party (SPD) who has been serving as a member of the Bundestag from the state of North Rhine-Westphalia since 2013, representing the Oberhausen – Wesel III district.

== Political career ==
Vöpel first became a member of the Bundestag in the 2013 German federal election. He has since been serving as a member of the Defense Committee.

In addition to his committee assignments, Vöpel has been part of the German delegation to the Parliamentary Assembly of the Organization for Security and Co-operation in Europe (OSCE) since 2018. From 2014 to 2017, he also served as deputy chair of the German-Slovak Parliamentary Friendship Group.
