= Rudolf Klug =

German educationist

- Born: 8 October 1905; Hamburg, Germany
- Died: 28 March 1944 (aged 38); Beisfjord, Norway
- Cause of death: Execution by firing squad
- Occupations: School teacher and Communist activist
- Known for: being executed following double conviction by a military court for treason and desertion
- Political party: KPD
- Spouse(s): 1. Ilse ca. 1935; 2. Margarete Kubicki 1940
- Children: Anja Klug 18 April 1942

Rudolf Klug (8 October 1905 – 28 March 1944) was a Hamburg school teacher. He became a member of the Communist Party in 1928 and suffered from growing levels of harassment at work. When the Nazi Party took power in Germany at the beginning of 1933 his problems greatly intensified: he had already been dismissed from one teaching post, and participated in (now illegal) resistance to the government.

During the war he was released from the concentration camp at Sachsenhausen and, in 1943, declared fit for military service and conscripted into the Army. A reluctant soldier, he was sent off to guard prisoners of war. After he helped a Soviet officer to escape by returning the man's gun he found himself before a military court which conferred a double death sentence on him. He was executed in northern Norway.

== Life ==
Klug was born into a Hamburg working-class family, the first of his parents' three recorded children. His father, Ernst Klug, had grown up far to the south in Vogtland where he had turned down the opportunity to train as a teacher, preferring an apprenticeship as a butcher because, as he put it, "a butcher can always get enough to eat". As a young man, while travelling, Ernst Klug met Emma Lucht in Hamburg. Her family came from nearby Albersdorf, and after a protracted courtship the couple married and set up their home in the Hamburg quarter of Eimsbüttel. The port facilities at Hamburg were booming during the early years of the twentieth century, and by the time Rudolf Klug was born in 1905 his father was working not as a butcher but as a dock worker. Ernst Klug was also active as a trades unionist.

Before he was 9 the First World War had broken out and his father was called away to join the army. In 1916 his younger brother, Ernst-Otto was born, and with the household budget under pressure Rudolf took work as a part-time errand boy, although his mother had to be persuaded to lie about his age for this to be possible. Meanwhile, he moved on from primary to secondary school, hoping to study to become a teacher. His father believed that the option was unaffordable, but his mother took extra work and as he grew older Rudolf also took every opportunity to work during the vacations in order to fund the necessary courses. In 1923 he embarked on a period as a trainee teacher, while continuing to study for the necessary qualification. His pedagogic studies focused, especially, on psychoanalysis and individual psychology. He qualified in 1927 (which was also the year in which his father died following a work accident at the docks) and took a teaching post at the Secondary School in Hamburg's Telemann Street. The co-educational school was considered a progressive establishment with a moderately socialist ethos. His sister later recalled that he developed excellent relationships with the children he taught and was also popular with parents.

With his younger sister, Kati, he started attending a youth club and his political awareness began to develop. While he was considering the need to broaden the access of working class children to education he became a co-founder of the so-called "Proletarische Volksheim-Jugend" organisation. In 1929 Rudolf and Kati joined the Young Communists and the Communist Party itself. They participated in day trips and evening political discussions organised by the party.

Hamburg city politics during the later 1920s reflected national trends, with the Social Democrats and traditional conservative parties losing out to the Communists on the left and, even more starkly, to the Nazis at the other extreme. Rudolf Klug became involved with the "Interests Community of Opposition Teachers" ("Interessengemeinschaft Oppositioneller Lehrer" / IOL) which was created in 1931 in order to "oppose the dismantling of social rights and achievements in education and the growing risk of fascism". (Note: um "dem Abbau der sozialen Rechte und Errungenschaften im Bildungswesen und der zunehmenden faschistischen Gefahr entgegenzutreten" to "oppose the dismantling of social rights and achievements in education and the growing risk of fascism") As a popular young teacher who was also a Communist Party activist Rudolf Klug generated mistrust at an increasingly jittery city hall, both among the Nazis and among the traditional conservatives. An investigation hearing was launched in May 1930 after he had been denounced for "creating squads of school children" to "fight against fascism in schools". The allegation concerned not the school where he worked but a nearby school in Rellinger Street (where he had never had any involvement). While the investigations triggered by the complaint were under way the party selected him as a candidate for the 1931 municipal elections and he was dismissed from the teaching service. Pupils and teachers at his own school in Telemann Street, supported by the governors, protested and the Social Democrat chairman of the governors Fritz Köhne succeeded in having him reinstated, but the supervisory school board nevertheless insisted that he be moved to another school, and asked the police to keep an eye on him.

The Nazis took power nationally in January 1933 and lost little time in converting the German state into a one-party dictatorship. Party political activity (unless in support of the Nazi party) became illegal. Early on Klug spoke out in public against the rapid withdrawal of human rights. Under the provisions of the Law for the Restoration of the Professional Civil Service ("Law for the Restoration of the Professional Civil Service") which had been in force since 7 April 1933 Klug was identified for permanent exclusion from the schools service on 17 June 1933. The law in question is generally cited as a device for removing Jews from public service, but there was also scope for applying it to other public servants, including teachers, who fell out of official favour for non race-based political reasons. Klug's name appeared in an advertisement in several Hamburg which listed a number of teachers "on leave from the schools service" (""aus dem Schuldienst beurlaubt"").

Klug had already had his apartment searched by police in May 1933, and been arrested while at school, but he had on that occasion been released for lack of evidence. Towards the end of the summer he was arrested again, and on 4 October 1933 condemned to a year in prison for "preparing high treason" ("Vorbereitung zum Hochverrat"). He was imprisoned at Wolfenbüttel till 11 August 1934, after which he was involved in forced labour at a young persons' holiday camp on the Island of Sylt. By the end of 1934 he was back in Hamburg and had taken work with the little coffee trading business set up near the dockside by the former municipal politician Kurt Adams. Two things he had in common with Adams (and with his fellow employees) were that he needed to support himself financially and that he had been deprived of his chosen career for reasons of politics and / or race. Klug's own work involved making deliveries by bicycle. In order to avoid drawing the interest of the authorities, the left-wing IOL, (Note: IOL = Interessengemeinschaft Oppositioneller Lehrer loosely: Interests community of Opposition Teachers) of which he had been a member earlier in the decade, had by now dissolved itself into a number of small and for most purposes isolated cells, but his delivery work nevertheless enabled Klug to keep in touch with political friends and teachers whom he had known in the IOL, as well as parents whom he had known when he was a teacher at the school in Telemann Street. And although his deliveries were officially only of coffee, he also took the opportunities presented to distribute illegal written materials.

Klug was probably subjected to a further arrest in 1935. In April 1937 he was one of around 100 political dissidents caught up in a Gestapo round-up. They were taken to the concentration camp at Sachsenhausen where Klug was held for three months. 1937 was also the year in which, after two years, his marriage to his wife Ilse broke up. On his release Klug returned to Hamburg, shortly afterwards resuming his illegal political activities and supporting himself with casual work. Later he found work as a credit control book keeper in Hamburg's Lurup quarter with an abrasives producer called Christiansen & Co. In 1938 he was interrogated at the city hall by the Gestapo who invited him to tell them about the illegal activities of teachers.

Participating in a political discussion group that masqueraded as an "emigrants' group", Rudolf Klug got to know the book seller Margaretha Kubicki. They married during 1940 and moved into an address at Barmbeker Street 93. Their daughter Anja was born on 18 April 1942.

In 1940 a communist resistance group coalesced in Hamburg around Bernhard Bästlein, Franz Jacob and Robert Abshagen. Rudolf Klug joined them. By the end of 1944 all four men would have been executed. In the world beyond Hamburg, the German invasion of Poland in September 1939 had triggered a wider war across Europe. Rudolf Klug's criminal record made him officially "unworthy for military service". According to his sister he was persuaded by comrades in the Bästlein-Jacob-Abshagen Group to apply to have his "fitness for military service" restored in order that he might join the army and create political opposition to the Nazis inside it. His wife always insisted that the application in question did not come from Klug at all. Either way, he was conscripted, not into the regular army but into a Landsturm (regional militia) . Here he was trusted to guard prisoners of war.

Still guarding prisoners of war, Klug's final posting was to Narvik in the north of occupied Norway. Here he made contact with prisoners and with a group of Norwegian resistance movement activists. In the context of preparations for the escape of a group of inmates from the prison camp, Klug returned a Soviet officer's pistol that had been confiscated and was being kept in the office. The absence of the pistol was spotted and on 26 February 1944 Rudolf Klug was detained. He managed to escape from his captors, but was betrayed by members of his unit and re-arrested. On 15 March a military court gave him a double death sentence, finding him guilty of both treason during war and of desertion. On 28 March 1944 the sentence was carried out when Rudolf Klug was shot dead just outside Narvik, at Beisfjord.

The military court notified the widow that Klug had been buried "on the spot." The court ordered Margarete not to publish any death notice or obituary about her husband.
