= Luise Albertz =

German politician (1901–1979)

Member of the Bundestag
- In office 7 September 1949 – 19 October 1969

Personal details
- Born: 22 June 1901 Duisburg, Rhine Province, Germany
- Died: 1 February 1979 (aged 77) Oberhausen, North Rhine-Westphalia, West Germany
- Party: SPD
- Occupation: Politician

Luise Albertz (22 June 1901 – 1 February 1979) was a German politician committed, throughout her life, to the Social Democratic Party (SPD). She was a member of the West German Bundestag (National Parliament) for two decades, until 1969. However, she was firmly rooted in the regional politics of her home city, Oberhausen, where she was the appointed mayor from 1946 to 1948. Following the establishment in 1949, by three of the four principal occupying powers, of West Germany, Albertz was elected mayor of Oberhausen in 1956 and held the office till her death in 1979. She was the first female mayor of a major city in Germany.

== Life ==
=== Early years ===
Luise Alberz was born in the city of Duisburg, in the western part of Germany's heavily industrialised Ruhr region, and approximately 12 km (7 miles) to the west of Oberhausen, where she made her career. Her father was the SPD activist Hermann Albertz (1877-1945), who later became a member of the Prussian Landtag (regional parliament) and whose life would end in the Bergen-Belsen concentration camp. Luise Albertz herself joined the youth wing of the Social Democratic Party (Sozialdemokratische Partei Deutschlands / SPD) in 1915, and joined the party itself as soon as she was old enough.

On leaving school she undertook an apprenticeship in local administration with the city hall in Oberhausen before obtaining a permanent post as a bookkeeper and then, from 1921 till 1933, heading up a branch of "Neueste Nachrichten", a regional daily newspaper produced on behalf of the city authorities. She remained in that job till 1933, which was a year of major regime change in Germany. During that year the Hitler government quickly established a one-party dictatorship, which meant that membership of any political party other than the Nazi Party was banned. The political affiliations of the Albertz family, and their contempt for Nazi philosophy, were no secret, and under the terms of the Law for the Restoration of the Professional Civil Service ("Gesetz zur Wiederherstellung des Berufsbeamtentums" / "Berufsbeamtengesetz"), signed into law in April 1933, Luise Albertz was dismissed from her job in public service. Between 1934 and 1939 she worked as a foreign currency bookkeeper ("Devisenbuchhalterin"). In 1939 war broke out, and with many male council workers sent away to join the army Albertz was one of those conscripted back into the public sector to replace them, working for the Oberhausen city administration as a municipal clerk and welfare officer.

=== Political career ===
War ended in May 1945, with northern Germany, including Oberhausen, now designated as the British zone of occupation. Albertz at this stage was secretary to the city's mayor, but now underwent a rapid succession of job changes and promotions. Under the military occupation she was elected to the city council in 1946 and in the same year appointed as city mayor.

Although she had been a member of the Social Democratic Party for more than two decades, sources are silent on her political activity till this point, suggesting that within the family public politics had been left to her father Hermann Albertz. During the twelve Nazi years the family was monitored by the authorities, regularly summoned for interrogation sessions and their home was subject to periodic raids. On 20 July 1944 an assassination attempt was made against Adolf Hitler. The dictator survived, but his regime had already prepared a list of several thousand names, to be used in the event of an escalation in political tension on the home front, and the name of Hermann Albertz was listed. In the context of the wave of arrests known as "Aktion Gitter", in August 1944 Hermann Albertz was arrested and taken to Sachsenhausen concentration camp. Two months later he was transferred to Bergen-Belsen concentration camp. Nothing is known of his subsequent fate, but sources assume he died or was murdered by the Nazis in the closing months of the war.

Luise Albertz participated in postwar reconstruction as a member of the "Zone Advisory Board" ("Zonenbeirat") in the British zone, and was also appointed to the supervisory board of the important heavy engineering Hüttenwerke Oberhausen AG business. In addition, she was appointed to the administrative board of the Nordwestdeutscher Rundfunk (broadcasting organisation) for the British occupation zone, and was a member of the German Council of the European Movement International.

Between 20 April 1947 and 17 June 1950, she sat as a member of the Regional Parliament for North Rhine-Westphalia, winning a seat for the electoral district of Oberhausen in the first election to a chamber that had been established the previous year, at that stage as a nominated assembly, by the British forces of occupation.

The Federal Republic was established in May 1949, and the first national election was held in August 1949. The name of Luise Albertz was high enough on the SPD party list of candidates for North Rhine-Westphalia to enable her to win a seat in the new Bundestag under the semi-proportional electoral system used. Later, in 1965, she won a seat directly tied to an electoral district, representing Oberhausen with a notable 52.6% of votes cast. In total Luise Albertz sat in the Bundestag for twenty years. From 1949 till 3 June 1959 she served as chairman of the Chamber's Petitions Commission.

== Personal ==
Luise Albertz remained childless and unmarried.
