= Elisabeth Zillken =

German politician

Elisabeth Zillken (born 8 July 1888 in Wallerfangen; died 28 November 1980 in Dortmund) was a German politician.

From 1919 to 1933 and again between 1945 and 1966, Zillken was a member of the Dortmund city council. From 1930 to 1933 she sat as a Centre Party member of the Reichstag (German national parliament). In October 1946 she was appointed a member of the (at this stage still nominated rather than elected) state parliament of North Rhine-Westphalia, serving for two consecutive terms, till April 1947.

== Life ==
=== Provenance and early years ===
Elisabeth Zillken was born at Wallerfangen, a small town to the north of Saarlouis, the eldest of the five children of Anna and Engelbert Zillken. After graduating from secondary school in Saarlouis she undertook a two year internship with a jewelry business in Mainz. She then embarked on a training at a private business school in Cologne, from which she emerged in 1910 with a teaching diploma. She taught till 1916 at commercial training institutions successively in Cologne, Hanover and Düsseldorf. Because of her social commitment she was recommended to Agnes Neuhaus founder and then chair of the "Catholic Association for the care of Girls, Women and Children" ("Katholischen Fürsorgeverein für Mädchen, Frauen und Kinder" / KFV), and on 1 October 1916 Zillken took over the position of KFV General Secretary.

=== Katholischen Fürsorgeverein für Mädchen, Frauen und Kinder (KFV) ===
With its so-called "rescue houses" and "mother and child hostels" the KFV supported unmarried mothers, especially those from the working class, which included post-birth accommodation for the mothers, help with finding work and foster care for the infant children. Zillken took over from Agnes Neuhaus the training and allocation of responsibilities for the volunteers who joined the enterprise. At the end of 1916 Neuhaus and Zillken set up their own training establishment for female carers at Dortmund. This represented an important contribution to professionalising social work. From simple beginnings the Dortmund school grew till in 1927 it received government recognition. The next year Dr. Anna Zillken, Elisabeth's youngest sister, took on the headship of it. During the First World War the KFV extended its scope to include war related work. Tailoring work for the army was carried out in KFV hostels. Towards the end of the war objectives were extended to included the care of foreign prisoners. The immediate postwar years were characterised, in Germany, by acute economic hardship and the KVF joined with other charitable organisations to work on alleviation of social hardship among the population.

=== Politics ===
In 1919 the "Catholic" Centre Party selected Elisabeth Zillken as a candidate for membership of the Dortmund city council, on which she served - with a twelve year break between 1933 and 1945 - till 1966.

By 1930 her friend and mentor Agnes Neuhaus, closer in age to 80 than to 70, had declared that she would not seek re-election to the Reichstag (national parliament), and in September of that year it was Elisabeth Zillken who successfully stood for the seat vacated by Neuhaus, representing, as in the city council, the "Catholic" Centre Party in Westphalia-South (Wahlkreis 18). She continued to sit as a Reichstag member till the abolition of democracy in the first part of 1933.

=== Twelve years under National Socialism ===
During the 1920s Elisabeth Zillken had also involved herself with the regional youth office ("Landesjugendamt"), but this was one of many activities that were curtailed after the National Socialists took power at the start of 1933 and transformed Germany into a one-party dictatorship. She herself wrote of this period:

"The secret national police (Gestapo) watched over us. They banned the youth offices to pull us out of that work, they banned our adoption support work and they banned our work in the prisons ... The prison work we nevertheless continued because no one from the Nazi side was doing it ... We had to submit to house searches and file seizures. I had to report each month to the Gestapo office in Dortmund-Hörde. The schools also encountered major difficulties. In 1944 an arrest warrant was issued against me, but it could not be executed because of issues with the paperwork." (Note: "Die Geheime Staatspolizei überwachte uns: sie verbot den Jugendämtern, uns zur Arbeit heranzuziehen, sie verbot uns die Adoptionsvermittlung und die Arbeit in den Gefängnissen. ... Die Arbeit in den Gefängnissen haben wir trotzdem weitergeführt, weil sie von nationalsozialistischer Seite niemand tat. ... Wir mußten uns manche Hausdurchsuchung und Aktenbeschlagnahme gefallen lassen. Ich mußte mich jeden Monat bei der Geheimen Staatspolizei in Dortmund-Hörde melden. Auch die Schule hatte erhebliche Schwierigkeiten. 1944 wurde Haftbefehl gegen mich erlassen, der aber wegen merkwürdiger Verkettungen nicht durchgeführt werden konnte." Elisabeth Zillken, quoted by Dr. Ursula Olschewski)

Agnes Neuhaus died towards the end of 1944 and Zillken took over her friend's role as KFV president, work which she combined with her existing responsibilities as General Secretary. She continued as president till 1958.

=== Post war (West) Germany ===
War ended in May 1945 and the western two thirds of Germany were divided into four large military occupation zones. The north-west of the country, including Dortmund, became the British military occupation zone. There were no longer any democratic political structures in operation, and while these were being prepared the military administrators set up institutions which as far as possible reflected the political balance evidenced by the 1932 elections, being the most recent democratic elections. The English appointed Elisabeth Zillken to membership of the Dortmund city council and of the regional parliament (Landtag) for the newly constituted province of North Rhine-Westphalia. She sat as a CDU member till April 1947, but with her sixtieth birthday looming on the horizon she did not then stand for election for a further term. The Christian Democratic Union CDU was in many ways a successor political party to the old "Catholic" Centre Party, but it was more broadly based. Across what remained of Germany there was a perception that the National Socialists had succeeded electorally because of political divisions between the more moderate parties and on the political left, and there was a shared determination on the part of the occupying powers to avoid a return to populism. In the west the military authorities strongly backed the creation of the CDU. Between 1947 and 1958 Elisabeth Zillken served as a deputy chair of the CDU Women's Union ("CDU-Frauenvereinigung").

In 1946 she joined with others in Dortmund from across the political spectrum to set up an overall welfare co-ordination structure, which kicked into life in September of that year. Others engaged in the project were Helene Wessel (Centre party) and Lotte Temming ( Communist). The overall organisation comprised 20 - 30 women divided into five working groups which devised practical proposals for the struggle to overcome the postwar emergencies. Urgent tasks included collection and distribution of food, organising coal allocations, getting the schools back into operation, arranging accommodation for the flood of refugees from the east, establishing nursery schools and the setting up of setting up laundry and cooking facilities. In May 1949 the British, French and US occupation zones (but not the Soviet occupation zone) were combined together and relaunched as the German Federal Republic (West Germany).

At the end of the 1950s and during the early 1960s Zillken was one of those involved in the preparation or amendment of a diverse range of laws covering matters such as youth welfare, the Law for Consolidating and Changing Family Law regulation and the National Social Support Law. Apart from a break between 1950 and 1953 when the job was taken on by Johanna Schwering, Zillken remained at the head of the KVF (renamed in 1968 "Sozialdienst Katholischer Frauen" / SkF) till after her 82nd birthday in 1971. She was also a vice-president at the German Caritas Association and a member of the executive board at the Deutscher Verein für öffentliche und private Fürsorge.

Elisabeth Zillken died at Dortmund on 28 November 1980.
