= Margarete Gröwel =

German politician (1899–1979)

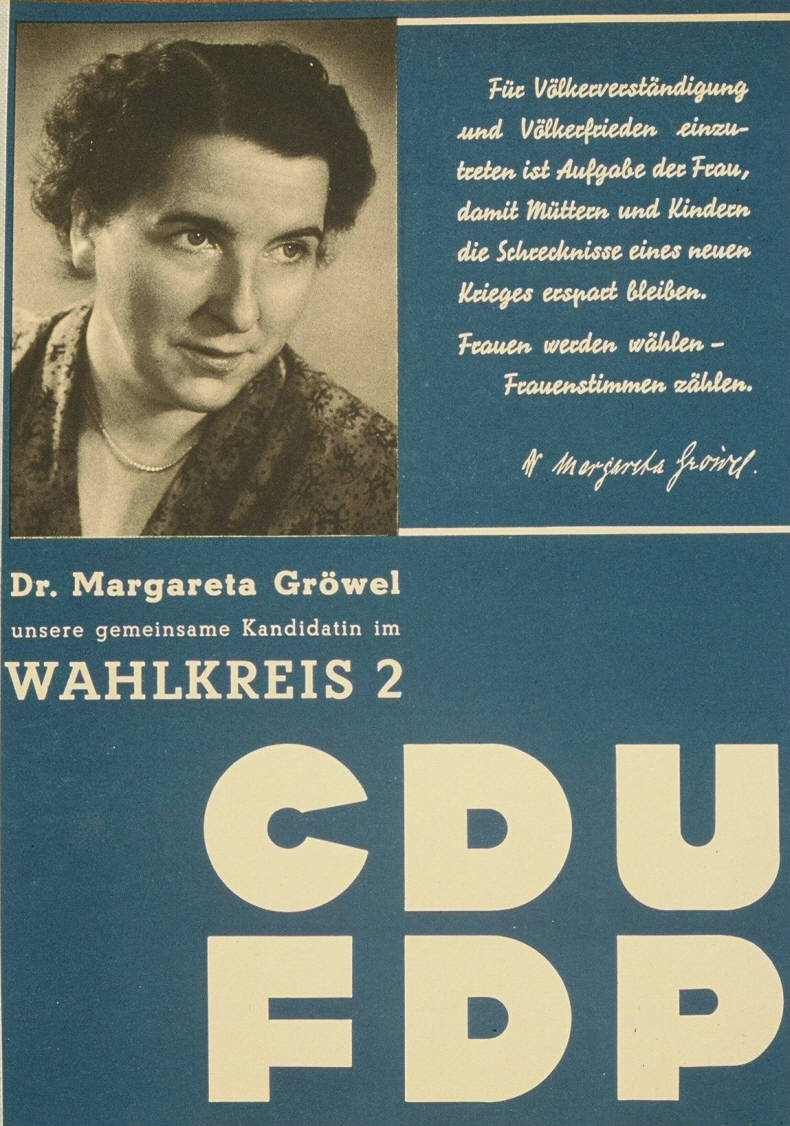
- Margarete Gröwel election poster (1949)

Member of the Bundestag
- In office 7 September 1949 – 7 September 1953

Personal details
- Born: 14 August 1899
- Died: 20 January 1979 (aged 79)
- Party: CDU

Margarete Gröwel (14 August 1899 – 20 January 1979) was a German teacher who became a politician (DZP, CDU). Later, in 1953, she became the first woman to serve in the German consular service in Houston.

== Life ==
=== Early years ===
Margarete Gröwel was born in Hamburg. She qualified as a teacher and taught at a Catholic school for boys in the city's St. Georg quarter. After the Catholic schools in Hamburg were closed down, in 1934, she enrolled as a student at University of Hamburg where she studied Philology, History, Ethnology and Philosophy. She progressed with her studies and in 1937 received a doctorate, for which she was supervised by the ethnographer-anthropologist Georg Thilenius. Her dissertation concerned the education problems of "Indian" (Native American) children in the United States. After passing the necessary further exams she worked in a teacher training college and at a secondary school in Hamburg.

=== Public service ===
As a young woman during the Weimar years Gröwel was engaged in charitable and women's social welfare associations. She was also politically engaged, joining the catholic Centre Party in 1921 or 1924. An influential political mentor was Hedwig Fuchs. During the years before 1933 she was active in Hamburg within the Association for German cultural relations abroad ("Verein für Deutsche Kulturbeziehungen im Ausland" / VDA), the Windhorst League ("Windthorstbund") and the Catholic German Teachers' League ("Verein der katholischen deutschen Lehrerinnen" / VKDL). In 1939 she switched from the VKDL to the National Socialist Teachers League ("Nationalsozialistische Lehrerbund" / NSLB). (Although membership of the NSLB was not compulsory, it had by this time become in practical terms the only permitted association representing teachers.)

Active participation in quasi-political associations during the Weimar years evidently placed Margarete Gröwel on a list of potential government targets. The failed assassination attempt against Hitler was followed by a mass-roundup of people identified as anti-Nazis. The overwhelming majority of those arrested in what came to be known as "Aktion Gitter" had been active as members or supporters of the Communist or Social Democratic Party during the Weimar years. A handful had not. There is no indication in the sources that Gröwel was ever a Communist or a Socialist (or a Nazi), but during August 1944 she was one of approximately five thousand people arrested. She was taken to the concentration camp at Fuhlsbüttel on the north side of the city centre. However, she was released on 29 August 1944.

=== Postwar politics ===
War ended in May 1945, leaving Hamburg in the British occupation zone (after May 1949 part of the Federal Republic of (West) Germany). There was a widespread view that it was the failure of the traditional political parties to present a united front that had enabled populist politicians to take power in 1933, and the Christian Democratic Union (CDU) was created in 1945 to embrace the entire palette of centrist and moderate right-wing political traditions. In Hamburg Margarete Gröwel was a co-founder. She became a deputy president (and chair of the Women's Committee) in the new party in the British zone. At the party's first national conference, held in Goslar in 1950, she was elected a member of the party's national executive.

Locally, during the early postwar years she took a job at the library attached to the Hamburg Museum of Ethnology, where her former tutor Georg Thilenius had been the director for three decades till 1935. She was politically active locally as a member of the city council, and as president of the city's cultural commission closely involved in negotiations over cultural matters with Ascan Klée Gobert and Gerd Bucerius.

=== Beyond politics ===
In 1953 she married the Austrian engineer Maximilian Sztollar, after which her name became Margareta Sztollar-Gröwel. This coincided with the conclusion of her direct political involvement, and she joined the West German consular office in Houston, Texas, the first woman ever to do so. She worked to develop commercial relations between West Germany and the American south. After her return from Houston she took on the same function closer to home, at Liège in Belgium, where she was posted between 1962 and 1964.
