= Johann Langewand =

Johann Franz Langewand (born 3 March 1871 in Osnabrück, died 19 March 1952 ibid.) was a German Catholic politician in the Weimar Republic, member of the Centre Party, and a member of the Prussian state parliament.

== Private life ==
Son of a worker, Langewand became a locksmith and set up his own company in 1898 together with a partner. From that time, "Hagedorn & Langewand Construction Tools Co." ("Baugerätefabrik Hagedorn & Langewand" ) specialized in the production of heating system and wheelbarrows. Langewand was a longstanding member of the local locksmiths' guild and from 1903 to 1935 member of the board of the chamber of handicrafts. In World War I, he served in the German armed forces as a vice sergeant. He married Maria, née Weber, in 1899, together they had two sons, Heinrich (1901-1966) and Franz Langewand jun. (1912-1984).

== Political career until 1933 ==
Langewand's political career in the Weimar republic began in 1919, when he became vice secretary of the Catholic Centre Party in the district of Osnabrück. In the same year, he was elected into the Prussian Constitutional Assembly. Only one year later, he made way for the more influential trade union secretary Josef Hagemann. Langewand was elected into the Landtag of Prussia twice, in 1932 and 1933. After Adolf Hitler's seizure of power in 1933, which Langewand strongly opposed (he was shouted down by an infuriated pro-Nazi crowd on several occasions), he withdrew from politics.

== Political activity after 1945 ==
Due to his age and the loss of his house during the Allied bombing of Osnabrück in March 1945, Langewand did not return into active politics after 1945. Nevertheless, he supported the foundation of the CDU as an inter-denominational party.

== Sources ==
- Handwritten memoirs, Langewand family, Nordhorn/Germany

== Literature ==
- Handbuch für den Preußischen Landtag. Ausgabe für die 4. Wahlperiode (von 1932 ab). Hrsg. von E. Kienast, Berlin 1932, S. 459.
- Handbuch für den Preußischen Landtag. Ausgabe für die 5. Wahlperiode (von 1933 ab). Hrsg. von E. Kienast, Berlin 1933, S. 354.
- Herbert Hömig: Das preußische Zentrum in der Weimarer Republik, Mainz 1979, S. 264 u. 301.
