= Niema Movassat =

German politician (born 1984)

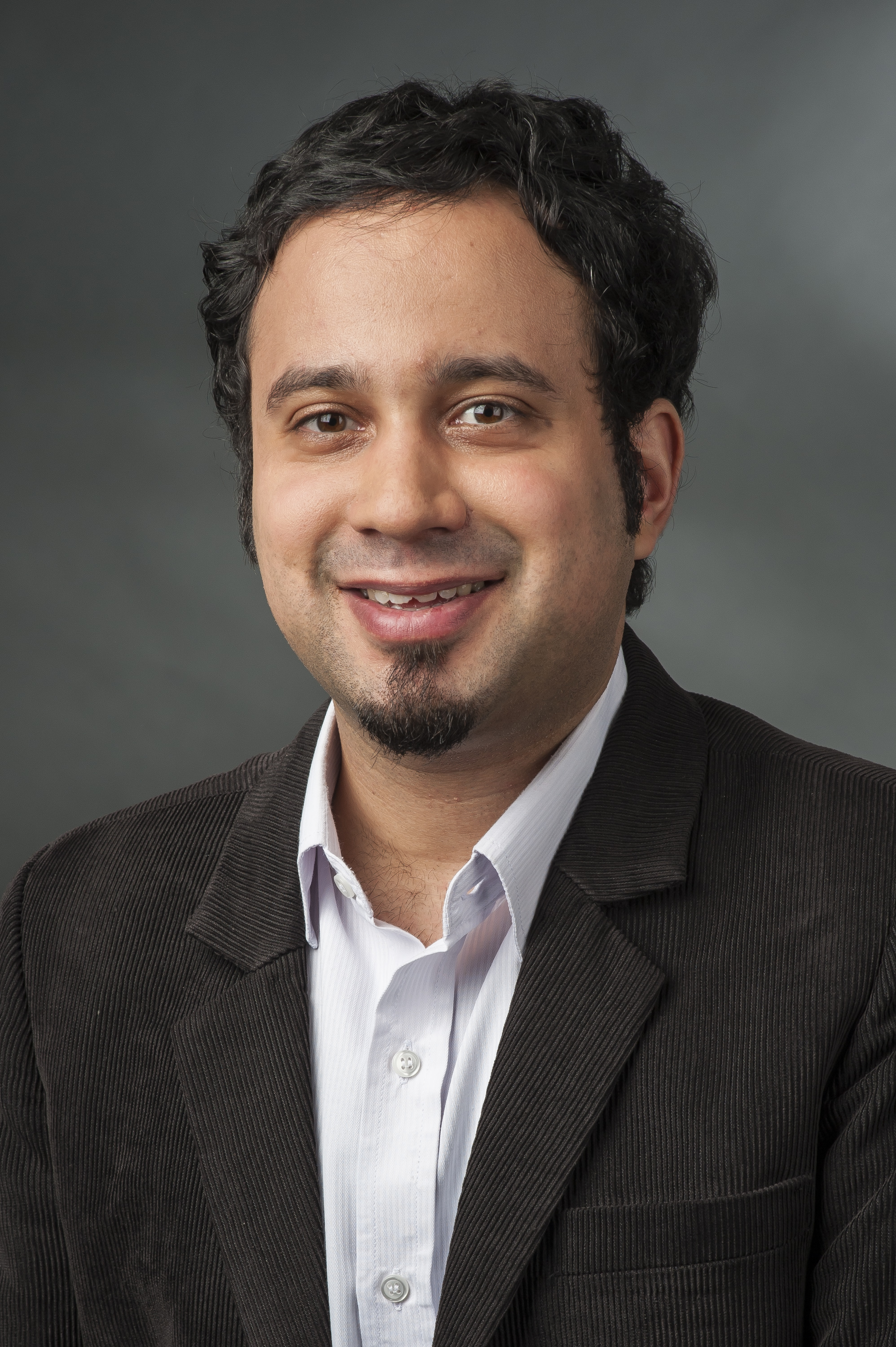
- Movassat in 2014

Member of the German Bundestag from North Rhine-Westphalia
- In office 2009–2021

Personal details
- Born: 22 August 1984 (age 41) Wuppertal, West Germany (now Germany)
- Party: The Left

Niema Movassat (born 22 August 1984) is a German politician from The Left. He served as a member of the Bundestag from the state of North Rhine-Westphalia from 2009 to 2021.

== Life ==
Movassat was born in Wuppertal, North Rhine-Westphalia, as the son of an engineer and a radiographer, both of Iranian descent. At the age of three his family moved with him to Oberhausen. Here he first attended the Adolf-Feld-Grundschule and in 2004 he passed his Abitur at the Elsa-Brändström-Gymnasium. He then studied law at the Heinrich-Heine-University in Düsseldorf, which he completed in April 2009 with the First Legal Examination as Diplom-Jurist. He became member of the bundestag after the 2009 German federal election. He is a member of the Committee on Legal Affairs and Consumer Protection. In June 2020, Movassat announced that he would not seek a fourth term and stood down at the 2021 German federal election.
