= Marie-Luise Dött =

German politician

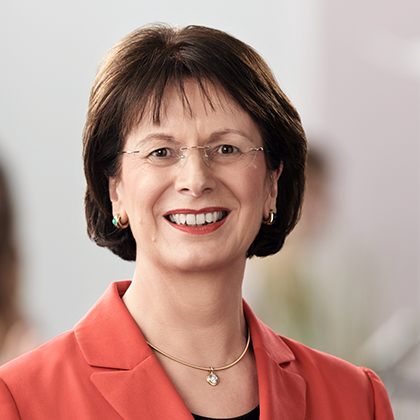

Member of the Bundestag
- In office 1998–2021

Personal details
- Born: 20 April 1953 (age 73) Nordhorn, West Germany (now Germany)
- Party: Christian Democratic Union
- Children: 1

Marie-Luise Dött (née Duhn, born 20 April 1953 in Nordhorn) is a German politician of the Christian Democratic Union (CDU) who served as a member of the Bundestag from 1998 to 2021.

== Early life and work ==
After graduating from high school, Dött completed an apprenticeship as a retail saleswoman in Würzburg. She then trained as a gemologist and diamond expert in Idar-Oberstein. She was co-owner of a jewelry shop with a goldsmith's and watchmaker's workshop in Höxter. Dött is married and has one son.

== Political career ==
=== Career in local and state politics ===
Dött joined the CDU in 1984 and is mainly active in the CDU's Mittelstands-und Wirtschaftsvereinigung (MIT). From 1994 to 2005, she was a member of the MIT state executive committee in North Rhine-Westphalia, and has been a member of the MIT federal executive committee since 1995. From 1997 to 1999, she was also a member of the CDU state executive in North Rhine-Westphalia.

From 1997 to 1999, Dött was a member of the town council of her hometown Höxter.

=== Member of the German Parliament, 1998–2021 ===
Dött was a member of the German Bundestag from the 1998 elections. From then, she always entered the Bundestag via the North Rhine-Westphalia state list.

From November 2005, Dött chaired the Environment, Nature Conservation, Construction and Nuclear Safety working group of the CDU/CSU Parliamentary Group in the German Bundestag, and thus also its environmental policy spokeswoman. In addition to her committee assignments, she was a member of the Parliamentary Friendship Group for Relations with the Baltic States; the Parliamentary Friendship Group for Relations with the Northern Adriatic States; and the Berlin-Taipei Parliamentary Circle of Friends.

In the negotiations to form a Grand Coalition of the Christian Democrats (CDU together with the Bavarian CSU) and the SPD under the leadership of Chancellor Angela Merkel following the 2013 elections, Dött was part of the CDU/CSU delegation in the working group on the environment and agriculture, led by Katherina Reiche and Ute Vogt. In similar negotiations following the 2017 federal elections, she was part of the working group on energy, climate protection and the environment, this time led by Armin Laschet, Georg Nüßlein and Barbara Hendricks.

Dött lost her seat at the 2021 German federal election.

== Other activities ==
From 2001 to 2017, Dött was federal chairman of the Federation of Catholic Entrepreneurs. She is a member of the Board of Trustees of the AFOS Foundation and the Don Bosco Mondo and a member of the Presidium of the Guardini Foundation. She is a member of the Executive Committee of the Förderverein Hochschule Rhein-Waal e. V. and a member of the Commission for Contemporary History e. V. She is also involved in the Strukturgesellschaft e. V. in Berlin, where she is chairwoman of the advisory board for the Environment, Nature Conservation and Nuclear Safety. She is a former curator of the Initiative Neue Soziale Marktwirtschaft, and is also a member of the Executive Committee of the Handelsverband Deutschland (HDE) and the German-Jordanian Society.

== Political positions ==
Asked about her motivation, Dött explained that she comes from the business world and deliberately chose environmental policy in order to "avoid changing things to the worse". She said that in her election, she had to "prevail against those do-gooders."

=== Climate change ===
Dött sees global warming as not only caused by mankind and calls for a departure from climate change mitigation, which, in her opinion, would impose new burdens on the economy. At a discussion event hosted by Paul Friedhoff (FDP), a member of the German Bundestag, at which the controversial physicist Fred Singer also appeared, Dött criticized the climate protection policy of the then-red-green federal government as a "substitute religion" in 2010. She lamented that most people are "easily influenced and easy to handle," and said ironically that doubters "can be outlawed, they may have to confess, they may have to go to purgatory or even to hell if they are very bad." Dött described Singer's remarks as "very, very plausible. By this, she meant that other positions, which do not agree with the red-green "substitute religion" and contain considerable reservations about it, must also be heard and respected. In a later press release, Dött explained that she used the term "substitute religion" to characterize those who try to give climate protection a political primacy and make it the sole yardstick of energy policy. A spokesman for the CDU/CSU parliamentary group in the Bundestag stated that Dött's statements did not correspond to the opinion of the parliamentary group. Nine years later, the Süddeutsche Zeitung stated in retrospect that this incident was the only time that Dött had caused a "major political sensation".

=== Nuclear energy ===
Since the agreement between the CDU and FDP, Dött has been committed to an accelerated phase-out of nuclear energy, but she emphasized: "We cannot do a head over heels restructuring according to the motto 'cost what it may'," thus confirming her position on ambitious climate protection policy based on economic efficiency and social equilibrium.

During the series of accidents at the Japanese nuclear power plant Fukushima I following the earthquake on 11 March 2011, Dött also spoke out in favor of maintaining the extension of the operating lives of German nuclear power plants. On the occasion of the accidents, it would have to be examined whether the safety standards in Germany had to be tightened.

=== Ethanol fuel E-10 ===
Dött takes a positive view of the introduction of the gasoline-ethanol fuel E10 and is in favor of its further introduction.

=== Human rights ===
Under the umbrella of the German parliaments' godparenthood program for human rights activists, Dött has been raising awareness for the work of persecuted Vietnamese lawyer Nguyễn Văn Đài since 2015; he was eventually granted asylum in Germany in 2018.

== Recognition ==
- 2010 – Bundesverdienstkreuz am Bande
