= Roman Müller-Böhm =

German politician (born 1992)

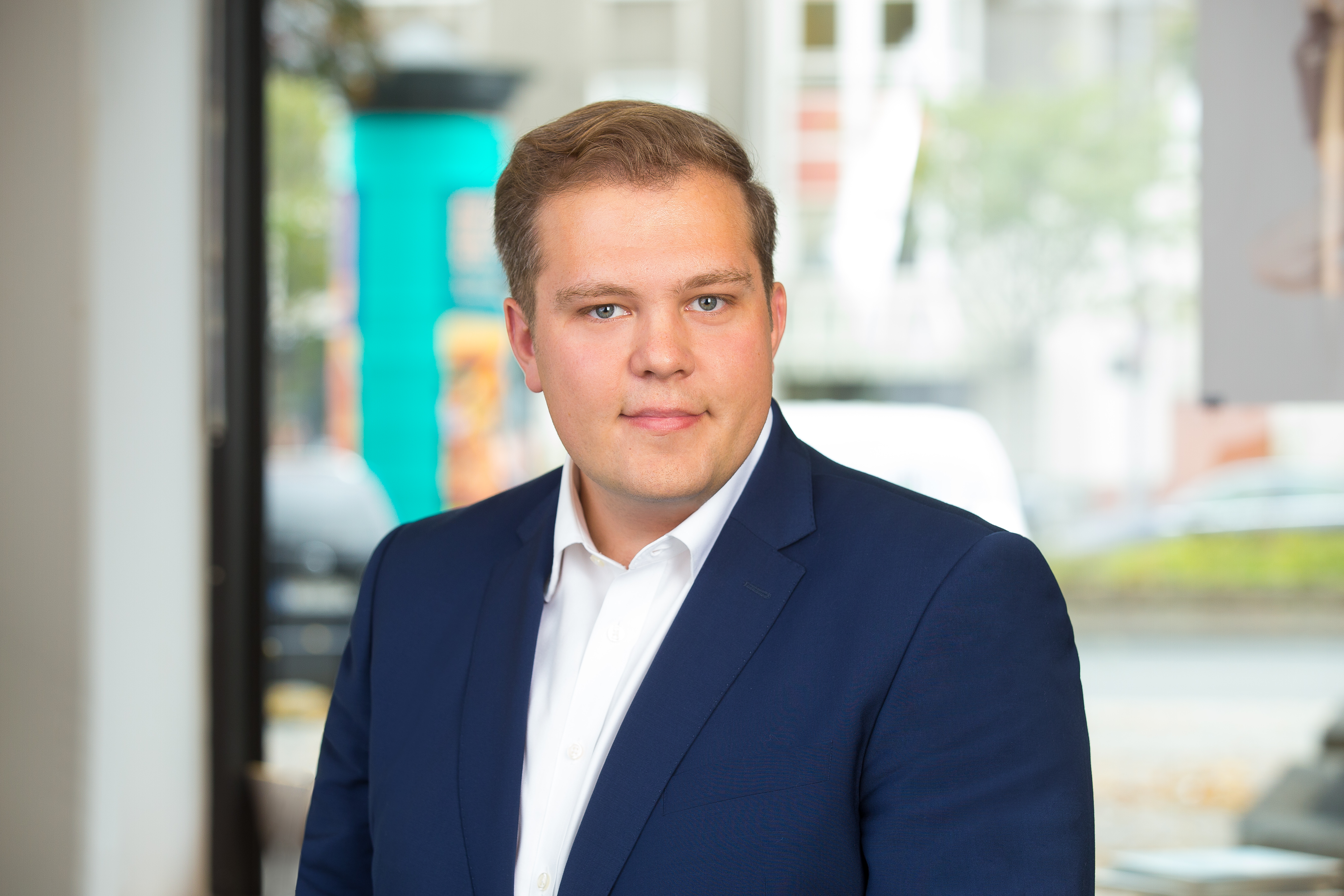
- Roman Müller-Böhm in 2017

Member of the Bundestag
- In office 2017–2021

Personal details
- Born: 12 December 1992 (age 33) Essen, West Germany (now Germany)
- Party: FDP

Roman Müller-Böhm (born 12 December 1992) is a German politician. Born in Essen, North Rhine-Westphalia, he represents the Free Democratic Party (FDP). Roman Müller-Böhm served as a member of the Bundestag from the state of North Rhine-Westphalia from 2017 until 2021.

== Life ==
Müller-Böhm completed his high school diploma in 2012 at the Luisenschule in Mülheim an der Ruhr. Since then he has been studying law in Bochum. He became member of the Bundestag after the 2017 German federal election. He was a member on the committee for law and consumer protection as well as the tourism committee.

His party did not renominate him as candidate for the 2021 federal election.
