= Martin Heix =

German politician (1903–1977)

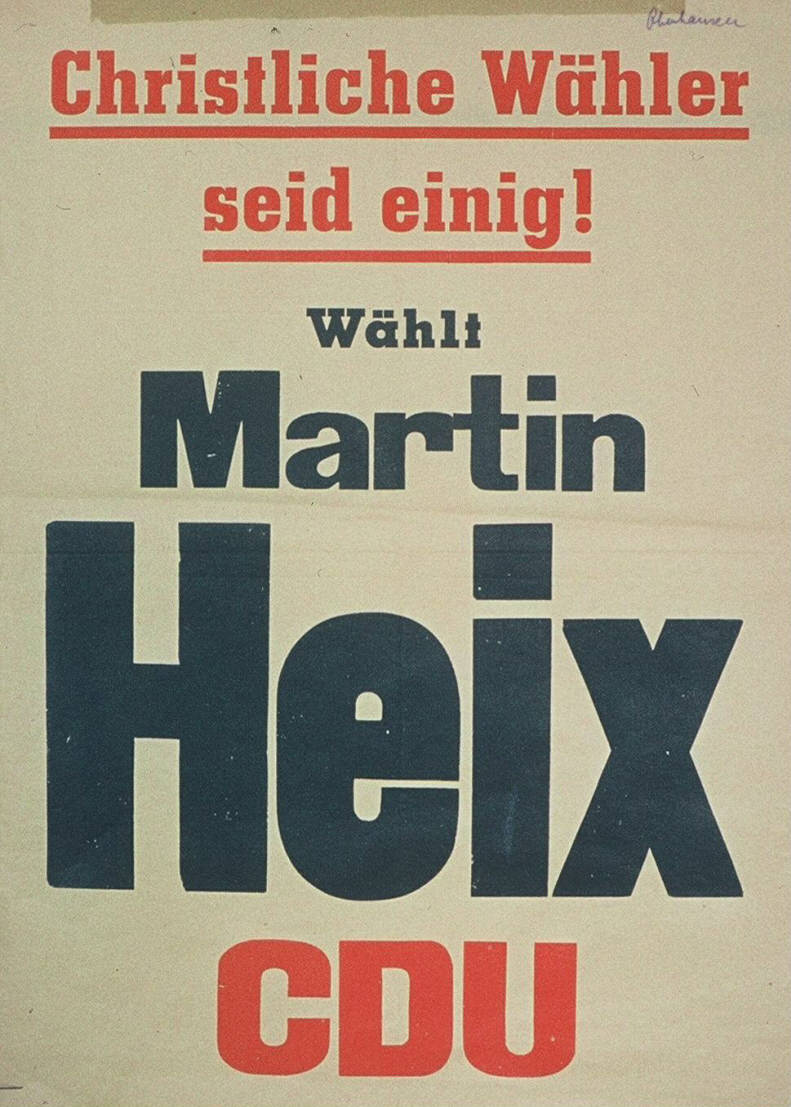
- Martin Heix' candidate poster for the 1949 federal elections

Member of the Bundestag
- In office 7 September 1949 – 17 October 1965

Personal details
- Born: 2 September 1903 Büderich (Wesel)
- Died: 24 April 1977 (aged 73) Oberhausen, North Rhine-Westphalia, Germany
- Party: CDU

Martin Heix (September 2, 1903 – April 24, 1977) was a German politician of the Christian Democratic Union (CDU) and former member of the German Bundestag.

== Life ==
After the Second World War he participated in the foundation of the CDU in Oberhausen, of which he was chairman from 1946 to 1962. Heix was a member of the appointed state parliament of North Rhine-Westphalia in 1946/47, which drafted the state constitution. From 1949 to 1965 he was a member of the German Bundestag. In the elections of 1949, 1957 and 1961 he won the direct mandate in the constituency of Oberhausen. From 1956 he was also a member of the Defence Committee of the German Bundestag.

== Literature ==
Herbst, Ludolf; Jahn, Bruno (2002). Vierhaus, Rudolf (ed.). Biographisches Handbuch der Mitglieder des Deutschen Bundestages. 1949–2002 [Biographical Handbook of the Members of the German Bundestag. 1949–2002] (in German). München: De Gruyter - De Gruyter Saur. p. 1715. ISBN 978-3-11-184511-1.
