= Aktion Gitter =

1944 Gestapo mass arrest action in Nazi Germany

Aktion Gitter [ʔakˈt͡sjoːn ˈɡɪtɐ] was a "mass arrest action" by the Gestapo which took place in Nazi Germany between 22 and 23 August 1944. It came just over a month after the failed attempt to assassinate the country's leader, Adolf Hitler, on 20 July 1944. The programme targeted former officials and members of mainstream centre and left-wing "Bourgeois" parties from the period of democratic government that were declared illegal after January 1933. Those arrested included Social Democrats and trades unionists, Liberals, Communists and Bavarian People's Party members, along with members of the old centre parties.

== Name ==
Aktion Gitter was the official title used by the government, but these events are also sometimes identified in sources as Aktion Gewitter ('thunderstorm') or Aktion Himmler; Heinrich Himmler was a senior member of the government whose areas of responsibility included policing and a wide range of other matters administered in his capacity as Minister of the Interior.

Gitter can be translated into English as "grille" or "lattice": in the context of the Aktion it refers to putting people "behind bars". The term had already been officially used before, in connection with a mass arrest overnight of more than 4,000 people that had taken place in Bohemia and Moravia on 16 March 1939, in connection with the completion of the German takeover in what had previously been the western part of Czechoslovakia.

== Planning ==
The mass arrests of Aktion Gitter were neither unprecedented nor a spontaneous government response to the assassination attempt of July 1944, but the working through of long-standing policies. Leading politicians from the Weimar years had been identified on a so-called government "A-list" as early as 1935/36, divided into sub-categories A-1, A-2 and A-3. At the outbreak of the Second World War in 1939 the Gestapo had arrested between 2,000 and 4,000 people whose names appeared on List A-1. These were identified as "enemies of the state" and placed in "protective custody", in most cases in the Buchenwald concentration camp. However, most of these had been released by the summer of 1940. Nevertheless, Hitler gave notice in April 1942 that "if a mutiny were to break out today somewhere in the country", it would meet with an immediate response (Sofortmaßnahmen). Directly following the outbreak of civil arrest or similar disturbances, all leading men from the [left-wing] opposition, and indeed also those from the Catholic political tradition would be arrested, removed from their homes and sent for execution. Additionally all concentration camp inmates would be shot along with all criminals, whether they were in state detention or at liberty at the time.

On 14 August 1944 SS Chief Himmler received the mandate to have former Social Democratic (SPD) and Communist Party (KPD) officials detained. The mass arrest, estimated to cover more than 5,000 former politicians, was to take no account of whether or not those detained were still engaged in opposition activity, and was not connected with the search underway for the July assassination plotters. Three days later all leading Gestapo officers in the country received a secret telex from Department 4 of the Reich Security Main Office (Reichssicherheitshauptamt; RSHA). It contained notification from Gestapo Chief Heinrich Müller that regional Landtags or city councils who had been members of the SPD and Communist Party of Germany along with all trade-union and party officials of the SPD, without regard to whether or not they were currently facing investigation, were to be detained. Those aged more than 70, those who were ill and those who had been "of service to the system" [since 1933] should be spared from arrest, however. The arrests were to happen nationwide during the early hours of 22 August. Orders were that detainees should then be taken without delay to the nearest concentration camp and taken into what was designated "protective custody" by the RHSA. Additionally, by 25 August Gestapo officers of the RHSA should then report the total numbers arrested, analysed according to political party and according to political functions. Himmler's orders arrived under the heading Aktion Gitter. On 21 August the order was extended so that pre-1933 assembly members from the old Centre Party were also to be detained, although this broadening of the scope of the action was partially rescinded two days later.

== Implementation ==
The arrests went ahead as instructed, in the small hours, either by Gestapo officers acting alone or by Gestapo officers acting in partnership with local police officers. Estimates indicate that approximately 5,000 were arrested across Germany, and most were promptly delivered to the closest concentration camp. Some of the concentration camps receiving the largest numbers of Gitter detainees were at Neuengamme near Hamburg (650), Buchenwald near Weimar (742) and Dachau near Munich (860). In Berlin detainees were taken to the main Gestapo prison in Prince Albrecht Street, and a large number from this area were also sent to Ravensbrück. The arrests had in many cases been undertaken on the basis of out-of-date lists: many of those arrested were old and ill, and had not been involved in politics for more than ten years. Some of those arrested had already been arrested during the immediate aftermath of the Nazi takeover in 1933, but subsequently released. Others found themselves arrested for the first time. Many were released after a few months in response to protests from family members.

Aktion Gewitter was a purely arbitrary action, a sudden and yet minutely executed hunting down across the whole of Germany. Only a few historians appreciate that this "Aktion" has absolutely no automatic connection with [the assassination plot of] 20 July.

Hanna Gerig (1900-1991)
– politician and widow of Aktion Gitter victim Otto Gerig

"The "Aktion" went unreported at the time, and remains strikingly overlooked in much of the subsequently produced history. It is usually mentioned, if at all, fleetingly, and in connection with the search for the 20 July plotters; but it had nothing to do with the assassination plot. It was nevertheless important as a first sign that Hitler was determined not to repeat what he had always maintained to have been the premature ending by German republican politicians of the First World War in 1918. It gave notice that under Hitler the war would be fought by Germany to the bitter end - in his own words "till five minutes past midnight" - regardless of how hopeless the cause had become...

Sebastian Haffner (1907-1999)
– political commentator and writer on historical topics

== Victims ==
The way in which the mass arrests were carried out triggered such popular resentment that one week later on 30 August 1944, Ernst Kaltenbrunner ordered a review that led to some mitigation. Overall the approach of the ruling Nazi Party remained inconsistent and unpredictable, however. On the one hand, many of the detainees were soon released in response to massive protests from their families and friends. But on the other, because of the inhuman conditions in the concentration camps during the winter of 1944/45, many of those who remained in detention died. That is what happened to Johanna Tesch and Joseph Roth. Former national Reichstag Gitter detainees who did not survive the concentration camps included Otto Gerig, Karl Mache and Heinrich Jasper. The Hamburg education reformer Kurt Adams was a Gitter victim who possibly did not even live to experience that year's winter. As the end of the war approached the authorities evacuated concentration camps in areas about to be overrun by enemy armies. Evacuation was accomplished through a succession of forced marches, which came to be known as death marches. Camp inmates unable to complete these death marches were simply shot. Former member of the Reichstag Friedrich Puchta initially survived his death march out of Dachau and lived to see liberation, after which he was immediately hospitalised. He perished shortly thereafter as a direct consequence of his internment at Dachau. Other Gitter detainees perished when the SS Cap Arcona, by then used as a prison ship and moored off Lübeck, was sunk by the British Royal Air Force the day before the German military surrender. Aktion Gitter was therefore a government reprisal that ended in death for many of those caught up in it.

Politician victims of Aktion Gitter who survived the experience and re-emerged as national politicians in the German Federal Republic (West Germany), following its establishment in 1949, include Konrad Adenauer (CDU), Paul Löbe (SPD) and Kurt Schumacher (SPD).

== Historiography ==
The historian Stefanie Schüler-Springorum, writing in 2005, noted that Aktion Gitter had at that time only been researched "selectively" for northern Germany. Subsequently other historians have endorsed the view that Gitter has not yet been conclusively researched.
