= Joseph Roth (politician) =

German politician (1896–1945)

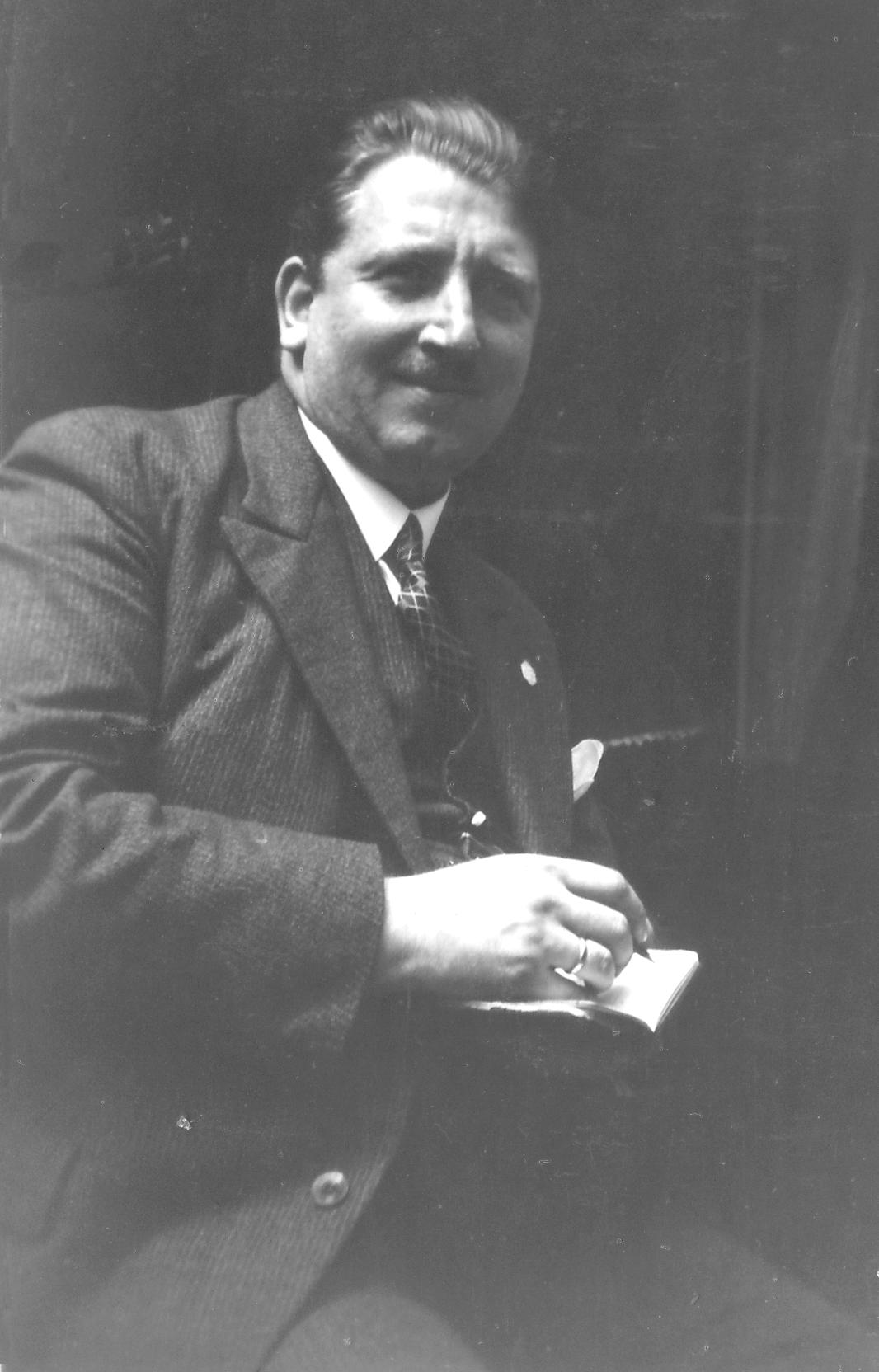
- Roth in 1930
- Born: 30 January 1896; Cologne, Germany
- Died: 22 January 1945 (aged 48); Bad Godesberg, Germany
- Political party: Centre Party
- Partner: Katharina Paffenholz

Joseph Roth (30 January 1896 – 22 January 1945) was a German teacher and politician from the Centre Party. He was chairman of the Centre Party in Bad Godesberg, and a member of the Bonn County District Council.

== Life and career ==
Roth was the first of seven children of church painter Wilhelm Roth (1870–1948) and his wife Margarethe Kruth (1866–1932). He grew up in the Belgian Quarter of Cologne in a strict Catholic environment. Three of his younger brothers were priests: Willi (1898–1952), Ernst-Moritz (1902–1945), and Karl Gustav (1902–1987). Roth was supposed to take over his father's company, Roth & van der Kaaij, but his younger brother, Albert (1897–1914), decided to learn the craft of their father, and hence took his place.

After attending primary school, Roth trained as a primary school teacher in Euskirchen.

From 1914 to 1917, he participated in the First World War as a volunteer in the 5th Westphalian Infantry Regiment No. 53 and was wounded at Neuve Chapelle. he was awarded the Iron Cross 1st Class and the Wound Badge. After being relieved from duty in 1917, he returned to his educational training and graduated in January 1918.

He taught in various schools:

- 20 February 1918 – 15 June 1918 in Obergeilenkausen
- 17 June 1918 – 15 January 1919 in Honrath
- 18 January 1919 – 31 March 1921, the Burgschule Godesberg
- 1 April 1921 – 15 July 1921 at the catholic primary school in Rheinbach
- 16 July 1921 – 13 September 1921 at the school in Euskirchen
- 11 October 1921 – 1 May 1922 in Porz
- 2 May 1922 – 31 August 1924 Friesdorf
- 1 December 1925 – 31 March 1927 in Mehlem
- 1 April 1927 – 31 July 1927 at the primary school Burgschule in Godesberg.

Finally, he worked as an elementary school teacher starting on 9 August 1927 at the Burgschule. In 1924, he married Katharina Paffenholz (1900–1979). His political career started in the Windthorstbund (Windthorst covenant) in Bad Godesberg. He quickly joined the Centre Party, chaired by the former Bonn County Council member, Peter Hensen (1888–1958). After Hensen resigned from the chairmanship in 1931, Roth was chosen to succeed him In March 1933, he was elected to the Bonn County District Council for a full term.

== Political career ==
Roth started his political career in the youth-oriented organization of the Catholic Centre Party, the Windhorstbund. From there he would quickly make his way into the party, under the wing of Peter Hensen, who was at the time the chair of the city council in Bonn-Land. In a short time, he would become Hensen's representative in the city council.

== Persecution in Nazi Germany ==
From 1924 onwards, Roth had also worked as an editor for the Godesberger Volkszeitung ("Godesberg People's Daily"), the party newspaper of the Godesberg Centre Party. He published many articles criticizing the Nazis. After the Nazis had seized power in Germany, Roth and Godesburg Mayor Josef Zander (1878–1951) was put on forced leave and put in protective custody for one day on 13 March 1933, thanks to the efforts of Heinrich Alef(1897–1966). Recorded in the Burgschule history where he worked as a teacher, is this:

"On Monday, March 13th, the national revolution was carried out in Godesberg. An SA team (Sturmabteilung) occupied the town hall and forced the mayor, both salaried councilors, and three other officers to take a "leave of absence" immediately. Such a department of 20–30 men also appeared at the Burgschule and caused the teacher Roth to be put on leave immediately because he had vehemently fought the National Socialists in his capacity as chairman of the Godesberg Centre Party."

On 3 June 1933, again under massive pressure from Alef, now the National Socialist mayor of Bad Godesberg, he was forced from his position as deputy county council and his position as Chairman of the Centre Party lay in Bad Godesberg. A few weeks later, on 6 April, Alef wrote in his office as a state commissioner to attempt to offset Roth as a teacher:

"[The] Teacher Roth was and probably still is the leader of the local Centre party. In this capacity he made himself untenable in Bad Godesberg by spreading untrue allegations, especially about the NSDAP. He is also referred to as the originator of the inflammatory articles that repeatedly appeared in the local organ of the Centre (Godesberger Volkszeitung), which had particularly complicated and inhibited the development of the national uprising here in central [i.e. close to the Centre Party] Bad Godesberg. Roth has also often appeared as a public speaker and has not shied away from insults and hurtful expressions towards his political opponents on these occasions."

Nevertheless, in 1935 he was still working as a teacher at the Bad Godesberg Burgschule. Only in 1935 was Alef successful, and Roth was transferred to the elementary school of Friesdorf. In the same year his brother, vicar Ernst Moritz Roth, was also in big trouble with the Nazis. When the war broke out in 1939 Roth was initially drafted into the army, but due to an acute shortage of teachers and his age, he was dismissed in 1940. After Roth's return from the front, he met secretly with his friend Hans Karl Rosenberg (1891–1942, martyr of the catholic church):

"Sometime after his sudden disappearance, I think it was a few months, Mr. Roth suddenly reappeared but did not appear in school. However, he came to our house to visit, and my father locked himself in with him in his library. Hours later they parted and I never saw him again. "

Rosenberg died on 17 April 1942 as a result of a medical "non-assistance" because his father was Jewish. From 1940 to 1944 Roth had been working as a teacher in Friesdorf. On 22 August 1944, after the attempt on Hitler's life, Operation Valkyrie, he was arrested during the Operation Gewitter (operation storm), confined a day later in the Cologne Gestapo prison EL-DE Haus, and from there with other former members of the Reichstag and politicians, democratic parties (including with Konrad Adenauer (1876–1967), Thomas Esser (1870–1948), Josef Baumhoff (1887–1962), Peter Schlack (1875–1957), Otto Gerig (1885–1944, martyr of the catholic church), Peter Paffenholz (1900–1959), Peter Knab (1885–1963) and Hubert Peffeköver) was transferred in the labor camp (Arbeitserziehungslager) in the former exhibition halls in Cologne-Deutz. During his internment in the halls, his son Wilhelm (1932–1995) was questioned by the Gestapo headquarters of Cologne. On 16 September 1944 Roth, Gerig, Schlack, Baumhoff, Knab and Peffeköver with other former politicians and also with the priest Alexander Heinrich Alef (1885–1945) were deported to Buchenwald. Roth's camp number 81555 had previously been the late Resistance fighter Victor Delplanque's. Together with Baumhoff, Gerig, Knap, Peffeköver and Schlack, he was placed in the cell block 45. His younger brother Willi, to this time the Prior of the Dominican convent in Berlin, tried unsuccessfully through a well-known secretary in the Reich Chancellery to help his brother.

When he was released on 28 October 1944, Roth was given a so-called fuel injection (injection of phenol) by the concentration camp doctor. Shortly before the end of the year, Roth was ordered by the Gestapo to leave the Rhineland and go to Leipzig, but his brother Ernst hid him with a friend's family in Dattenfeld. At Christmas, weakened by the effect of the lethal injection, he was allowed to return home.

== Death ==
On 22 January 1945, he died at home from the effects of the poison. The authorities did not allow to carry out a regular funeral, and even the local priest had too many concerns to attend. Closest friends and schoolchildren carried the coffin to the cemetery on two sleighs. After Polish prisoners had dug the grave, Roth was buried by the immediate family: his wife, his children, and his siblings Ernst (in the capacity as a priest), Karl and Elisabeth (1899–1968). The Gestapo demanded an additional text on the death announcement:

"His health was heavily shaken because of the air raids and his death occurred suddenly."

== After 1945 ==
Katharina Roth had to fight to be accepted as a victim of political persecution, but finally got recognition as politically persecuted (recognition no. 123). In 1950 Peter Hensen suggested to the City Council to honor his fellow party member and Nazi victim. Then in the same year Friesdorf village square was renamed into Joseph-Roth-Place by the Mayor of Bad Godesberg, Heinrich Hopmann. After fierce public protests, however, the name of the place was overturned in 1956 and instead a street off the house of Roth was renamed into Joseph-Roth-Street. Again the residents protested against the name until the mid-1960s and threatened to boycott the election. But this time the protest was unsuccessful, and the street name remained.

In 1989, Bernd Wittschier wrote for the first time about the "martyr Roth" in his paper Theology, a supplement of the newspaper Offerten Zeitung für die katholische Geistlichkeit. In 1996, a call for witnesses for Roth was made by Monsignor Helmut Moll of the Journal of the Press Office of the Archdiocese of Cologne (No. 800). Finally in 1999, Roth was included in the compendium Zeugen für Christus (i. e. Witnesses for Christ) edited by Moll and was declared a martyr a year later by Pope John Paul II.

In the traveling exhibition "Martyrs of the Archdiocese of Cologne from the era of National Socialism," which has been shown in various places by the Education work of the Archdiocese of Cologne since 2000, there is a replica of his concentration camp number and the red triangle for political prisoners and also a brief outline of his life. When the exhibition was shown in his hometown Friesdorf in 2003, the local newspaper General-Anzeiger wrote in its issue of 12 May 2003: "A follower becomes a Nazi victim." The author of this sought to prove this by a photo that supposedly showed Roth with local Nazis in the mid-1930s. After rebuttal by Dr. Walle and granddaughter Jutta Roth (1960) with counter-evidence and the original photo, which could prove that the picture was taken in 1928 at a bowling tour, the General-Anzeiger had to print a counterstatement and then reported objectively on 14 May 2003 about the exhibition and the two friends and martyrs Roth and Rosenberg. Nevertheless, there were still several anonymous written attacks against the family in the months to come.

In 2003, a memorial to the martyrs of the present in Cologne was created in the Basilica of St. Ursula and Roth too found a place there in the newly created memorial chapel in that church. By the end of 2005, the city of Bonn paid tribute to Roth by declaring his grave a grave of honor (German: Ehrengrab). In May 2006, the artist Gunter Demnig laid a Stolperstein for Roth before the former living and dying house in Friesdorf.

== Honors ==
- 1950, 25 July: Joseph-Roth-Course (until 1956, after public protests) in Friesdorf
- 1956, 23 February: Joseph-Roth-Street in Friesdorf
- 2000, 7 May: Catholic martyr of the 20th Century
- 2005, 30 November: honorary grave in the city of Bonn
- 2006, 26 May: Stolperstein for Roth on his home address

== Literature ==
- Godesberger Heimatblätter. Rheinische Verlagsanstalt, Bonn, ISSN 0436-1024, Nr. 22 (1984) S. 101–105, Nr. 44 (2005) S. 156–157, Nr. 49 (2011) S. 157.
- Stadt Euskirchen, 700 Jahre Stadt Euskirchen, 1302–2002, Buchmanufaktur Handpresse Weilerswist, 2002, ISBN 3-935221-17-7, P. 252–256
- Helmut Moll, Martyrium und Wahrheit. Zeugen Christi im 20. Jahrhundert, Verlag Gustav-Siewerth-Akademie, Weilheim-Bierbronnen, 2005, ISBN 3-928273-74-4, P. 118–121
- Helmut Moll, Zeugen für Christus. Teil 1, Verlag Ferdinand Schöningh, Paderborn/München/Wien/Zürich, 2006, ISBN 3-506-75778-4, P. 318–321
- Josef Roth, Biographisch-Bibliographisches Kirchenlexikon, Verlag Traugott Bautz, Nordhausen, 2012, ISBN 978-3-88309-690-2, P. 1140–1144
