= Ulla Berghammer =

German politician (1887–1957)

Personal details
- Born: Ursula Much; December 26, 1887 Bad Tölz
- Died: September 24, 1957

Ulla Berghammer (born Ursula Much; 26 December 1887 - 24 September 1957) was a German politician. During 1946/47 she was a member of the advisory state assembly which preceded the Landtag of Rhineland-Palatinate, charged with creating a new state constitution.

== Life ==
Ursula Much was born at Bad Tölz, in the rolling alpine foothills to the south of Munich. She was one of her parents' thirteen recorded children. When she was 14 her mother died in the aftermath of a childbirth: Ursula devoted the next few years to the care of her younger siblings. This meant that after leaving middle school she was not able to progress her school education further.

In 1908 Ulla Much married the local master builder, Konrad Berghammer. Their daughter was born in 1909 and their son in 1920. In between those years, in 1911 they relocated to Frankenthal in connection with Konrad Berghammer's work. Despite being a long way to the west, Frankenthal in the Palatinate had been administered as part of Bavaria since 1816 thanks to the haggling between political leaders that had followed the Congress of Vienna. During the First World War Ulla Berghammer became a volunteer worker at a welfare centre and worked as a cook in a factory canteen. Details are sparse, but in 1920 she was honoured with the Cross of Merit for Volunteer Carers of the Sick. 1920 was also the year in which, thanks to Konrad Berghammer's work, the family moved again, this time to Landau in the south of the region.

In 1929, as politics in Germany became increasingly polarised, Ulla Berghammer became a member of the Catholic Centre Party. The same year she became a member of the municipal council. The context changed abruptly after the Nazis took power and lost little time in transforming Germany into a one-party dictatorship. The Catholic Centre Party was outlawed and Ulla Berghammer, as a member of it, was taken for a time into "protective custody". Landau is within a day's walking distance of the frontier with France, and after her release she helped fellow citizens who encountered persecution (and, as conditions deteriorated, death) because they were Jewish, to escape. Again, however, sources are short on detail.

After liberation in May 1945 she again involved herself in politics. She was a founding member of the local Christian Democratic Party which in December 1945 renamed itself as the Christian Democratic Union. It was as a CDU delegate that she participated in the Advisory State Assembly set up in August 1946 on the orders of General Kœnig. the commander in charge of the French occupation zone. She remained a member of the assembly till its final meeting on 25 April 1947 but was not a member of its successor body, the Landtag of Rhineland-Palatinate. The Advisory State Assembly of 1946/47 comprised 147 members. Only 6 were women, however. Ulla Berghammer was the eldest of the 6.

In 1949 Ulla Berghammer suffered a serious stroke, after which she was no longer to care for herself. Ulla and Konrad moved to Munich where she was looked after by her daughter till her death in 1957.
