= Helene Wessel =

German politician (1898–1969)

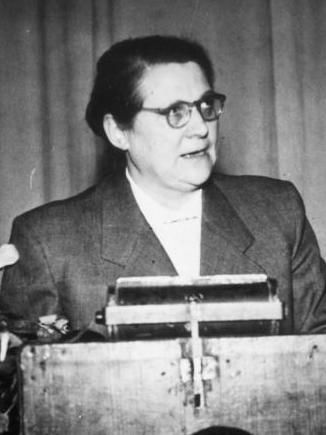
Wessel in 1952

Helene Wessel (6 July 1898 - 13 October 1969) was a German politician. From October 1949 to January 1952 she was chairwoman of the Centre Party and a founding member of the All-German People's Party, whose members eventually joined the SPD. She was elected to the Parlamentarischer Rat, the West German constitutional convention.

== Early life ==
Helene Wessel was born on 6 July 1898 in Hörde (now in Dortmund) and was the youngest of four children of the Reichsbahn officials Henry Wessel and his wife, Helene, née Linz. Her parents were deeply influenced by their Catholic faith, her father being a member of the German Centre Party. He died in 1905 from the consequences of an unknown accident.

She completed a commercial apprenticeship in November 1915 and worked as a secretary in the office of the Centre Party Horder. In March 1923, she began a one-year course at the State Welfare School in Munster for youth and social welfare. In 1919, she became involved in the Centre Party, and was elected in May 1928 in the Prussian Parliament. She managed two professions on as party secretary and another as a social worker of the Catholic Church. In October 1929, she settled at the Berlin Academy of German social and educational women's work to educate graduate welfare workers. After the Nazi seizure of power in 1933, Wessel was classified as "politically unreliable".

== Political career ==
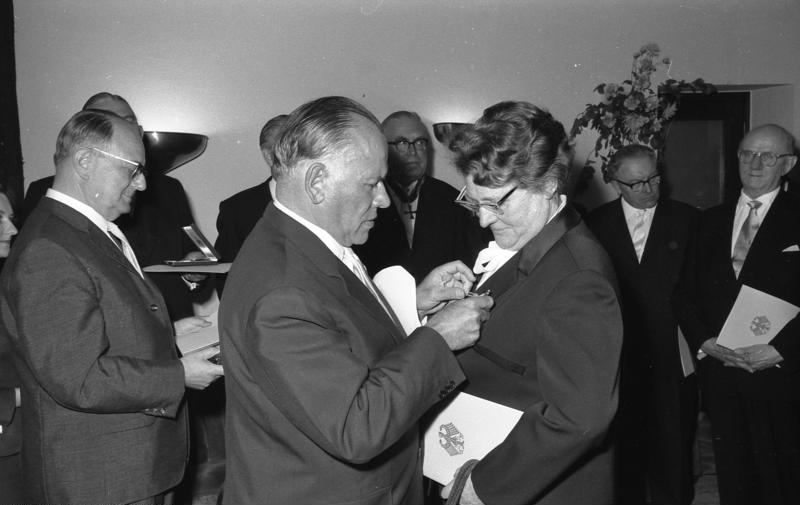
Helene Wessel receives the Order of Merit of the Federal Republic of Germany from Eugen Gerstenmaier.

After the Second World War she was active politically again. In 1949 she was one of the Centre Party's representatives in the Bundestag and also was elected chairwoman of the party, the first woman ever to lead a German party. A pacifist, Wessel the left-wing Catholic vocally opposed in 1951 Adenauer's policy of German rearmament and joined forces with the CDU's Gustav Heinemann, the former Minister of the Interior. Both formed the Notgemeinschaft zur Rettung des Friedens in Europa ("Emergency Community to Save Peace in Europe"), an initiative intended to prevent rearmament.

Wessel resigned from her post and in November 1952 and left the party. Immediately afterwards, Wessel and Heinemann turned the Notgemeinschaft into a political party, the Gesamtdeutsche Volkspartei ("Whole-German People's Party" aka GVP), which failed badly in the elections of 1953. In 1957, the GVP dissolved and most members joined the SPD.
