= Wesel I =

Federal electoral district of Germany

112 Wesel I
- Electoral district for the Bundestag
- Wesel I in 2025
- State: North Rhine-Westphalia
- Population: 261,500 (2019)
- Electorate: 206,270 (2021)
- Major settlements: Wesel; Kamp-Lintfort; Voerde; Moers
- Area: 884.0 km^{2}

Current electoral district
- Created: 1949
- Party: CDU
- Member: Sascha van Beek
- Elected: 2025

Wesel I is an electoral constituency (German: Wahlkreis) represented in the Bundestag. It elects one member via first-past-the-post voting. Under the current constituency numbering system, it is designated as constituency 112. It is located in the Ruhr region of North Rhine-Westphalia, comprising most of the district of Wesel.

Wesel I was created for the inaugural 1949 federal election. From 2021 to 2025, it was represented by Rainer Keller of the Social Democratic Party (SPD). Since 2025 it has been represented by Sascha van Beek.

== Geography ==
Wesel I is located in the Ruhr region of North Rhine-Westphalia. As of the 2021 federal election, it comprises the entirety of the Wesel district excluding the municipalities of Dinslaken, Moers, and Neukirchen-Vluyn.

== History ==
Wesel I was created in 1949, then known as Rees – Dinslaken. From 1965 through 1976, it was named Dinslaken. It acquired its current name in the 1980 election. In the 1949 election, it was North Rhine-Westphalia constituency 27 in the numbering system. From 1953 through 1961, it was number 86. From 1965 through 1976, it was number 84. From 1980 through 1998, it was number 82. From 2002 through 2009, it was number 114. In the 2013 through 2021 elections, it was number 113. From the 2025 election, it has been number 112.

Originally, the constituency comprised the districts of Rees and Dinslaken. In the 1980 through 1998 elections, it comprised the municipalities of Dinslaken, Hamminkeln, Hünxe, Schermbeck, Voerde, Wesel, and Xanten from the district of Wesel. It acquired its current borders in the 2002 election.

Election	No.	Name	Borders
1949	27	Rees – Dinslaken	Rees district; Dinslaken district
1953	86	Rees – Dinslaken	Rees district; Dinslaken district
1957	86	Rees – Dinslaken	Rees district; Dinslaken district
1961	86	Rees – Dinslaken	Rees district; Dinslaken district
1965	84	Dinslaken	Rees district; Dinslaken district
1969	84	Dinslaken	Rees district; Dinslaken district
1972	84	Dinslaken	Rees district; Dinslaken district
1976	84	Dinslaken	Rees district; Dinslaken district
1980	82	Wesel I	Wesel district (only Dinslaken, Hamminkeln, Hünxe, Schermbeck, Voerde, Wesel, and Xanten municipalities)
1983	82	Wesel I	Wesel district (only Dinslaken, Hamminkeln, Hünxe, Schermbeck, Voerde, Wesel, and Xanten municipalities)
1987	82	Wesel I	Wesel district (only Dinslaken, Hamminkeln, Hünxe, Schermbeck, Voerde, Wesel, and Xanten municipalities)
1990	82	Wesel I	Wesel district (only Dinslaken, Hamminkeln, Hünxe, Schermbeck, Voerde, Wesel, and Xanten municipalities)
1994	82	Wesel I	Wesel district (only Dinslaken, Hamminkeln, Hünxe, Schermbeck, Voerde, Wesel, and Xanten municipalities)
1998	82	Wesel I	Wesel district (only Dinslaken, Hamminkeln, Hünxe, Schermbeck, Voerde, Wesel, and Xanten municipalities)
2002	114	Wesel I	Wesel district (excluding Dinslaken, Moers, and Neukirchen-Vluyn municipalities)
2005	114	Wesel I	Wesel district (excluding Dinslaken, Moers, and Neukirchen-Vluyn municipalities)
2009	114	Wesel I	Wesel district (excluding Dinslaken, Moers, and Neukirchen-Vluyn municipalities)
2013	113	Wesel I	Wesel district (excluding Dinslaken, Moers, and Neukirchen-Vluyn municipalities)
2017	113	Wesel I	Wesel district (excluding Dinslaken, Moers, and Neukirchen-Vluyn municipalities)
2021	113	Wesel I	Wesel district (excluding Dinslaken, Moers, and Neukirchen-Vluyn municipalities)
2025	112	Wesel I	Wesel district (excluding Dinslaken, Moers, and Neukirchen-Vluyn municipalities)

== Members ==
The constituency was first represented by Franz Etzel of the Christian Democratic Union (CDU) from 1949 to 1953. He was succeeded by Heinrich Lübke until 1961, Arnold Verhoeven until 1965, and Konrad Kraske until 1969. Udo Hein of the Social Democratic Party (SPD) was elected in 1969 and served a single term; Uwe Jens of the SPD retained the constituency in 1972 and served until 2002. Fellow SPD member Hans-Ulrich Krüger served from then until 2009, when Sabine Weiss of the CDU was elected representative. Rainer Keller was elected for the SPD in 2021. Sascha van Beek was elected for the CDU in 2025.

Election	Member	Party	%
1949	Franz Etzel	CDU	35.5
1953	Heinrich Lübke	CDU	51.3
1957	Heinrich Lübke	CDU	50.2
1961	Arnold Verhoeven	CDU	44.3
1965	Konrad Kraske	CDU	46.8
1969	Udo Hein	SPD	50.7
1972	Uwe Jens	SPD	59.6
1976	Uwe Jens	SPD	55.8
1980	Uwe Jens	SPD	53.5
1983	Uwe Jens	SPD	49.8
1987	Uwe Jens	SPD	51.0
1990	Uwe Jens	SPD	48.5
1994	Uwe Jens	SPD	52.5
1998	Uwe Jens	SPD	57.8
2002	Hans-Ulrich Krüger	SPD	50.0
2005	Hans-Ulrich Krüger	SPD	49.0
2009	Sabine Weiss	CDU	38.5
2013	Sabine Weiss	CDU	43.5
2017	Sabine Weiss	CDU	39.0
2021	Rainer Keller	SPD	34.2
2025	Sascha van Beek	CDU	34.8

== Election results ==
=== 2025 election ===
Federal election (2025): Wesel I
Notes:	Blue background denotes the winner of the electorate vote. Pink background denotes a candidate elected from their party list. Yellow background denotes an electorate win by a list member, or other incumbent. A ✓ or ✗ denotes status of any incumbent, win or lose respectively.						
Party	Candidate	Votes	%	±%	Party votes	%	±%
CDU	Sascha van Beek	58,854	34.8	▲5.0	53,361	31.5	▼4.8
SPD	Kevin Waldeck	47,432	28.1	▼6.2	39,287	23.2	▼10.2
AfD	Adam Balten	29,375	17.4	▲10.6	29,406	17.3	▲10.5
Greens	Karl-Heinz Freckmann	13,786	8.2	▼4.4	16,091	9.5	▼3.4
Left	Manuela Bechert	10,275	6.1	▲3.2	11,150	6.6	▲3.4
BSW					6,304	3.7	
FDP	Bernd Reuther	6,123	3.6	▼5.5	7,205	4.3	▼6.6
Tierschutzpartei					2,534	1.5	▼0.1
FW	Rainer Döge	2,154	1.3	▲0.4	934	0.6	▼0.1
PARTEI				▼2.5	1,091	0.6	▼0.7
BD	Josef Heußen	1,036	0.6		346	0.2	
Volt					739	0.4	▲0.3
dieBasis	Matthias Moser			▼1.3	316	0.2	▼0.7
PdF					278	0.2	▲0.1
Team Todenhöfer					261	0.2	▼0.2
Values					90	0.1	
MLPD				▼0.1	63	0.0	0.0
MERA25					36	0.0	
Pirates							▼0.3
Gesundheitsforschung							▼0.1
Bündnis C							▼0.1
ÖDP							▼0.1
Humanists							▼0.1
SGP						0.0	0.0
Informal votes		1,398			941		
Total valid votes		169,035			169,492		
Turnout		170,433	83.5	▲5.6			
CDU gain from SPD	Majority	11,422	6.7				

=== 2021 election ===
Federal election (2021): Wesel I
Notes:	Blue background denotes the winner of the electorate vote. Pink background denotes a candidate elected from their party list. Yellow background denotes an electorate win by a list member, or other incumbent. A ✓ or ✗ denotes status of any incumbent, win or lose respectively.						
Party	Candidate	Votes	%	±%	Party votes	%	±%
SPD	Rainer Keller	54,488	34.2	▲1.4	53,277	33.4	▲4.7
CDU	✗ Sabine Weiss	47,448	29.8	▼9.2	42,544	26.7	▼7.0
Greens	Hans-Peter Weiß	19,928	12.5	▲7.0	20,629	12.9	▲6.8
FDP	Bernd Reuther	14,452	9.1	▲1.1	17,302	10.8	▼1.5
AfD	Holger Raumann	10,842	6.8	▼1.8	10,994	6.9	▼2.1
Left	Sidney Lewandowski	4,598	2.9	▼3.1	5,103	3.2	▼3.5
Tierschutzpartei					2,468	1.5	▲0.8
PARTEI	Dirk Zerressen	3,907	2.5		2,079	1.3	▲0.6
dieBasis	Matthias Moser	1,999	1.2		1,444	0.9	
FW	Christian Link	1,376	0.9		966	0.6	▲0.4
Team Todenhöfer					629	0.4	
Pirates					515	0.3	▼0.1
LIEBE					226	0.1	
Volt					209	0.1	
Gesundheitsforschung					205	0.1	0.0
LfK					162	0.1	
NPD					134	0.1	▼0.1
Bündnis C					92	0.1	
ÖDP					91	0.1	0.0
Humanists					84	0.1	0.0
V-Partei3					81	0.1	0.0
du.					73	0.0	
MLPD	Wolf-Dieter Rochlitz	127	0.1	▼0.1	65	0.0	0.0
PdF					53	0.0	
LKR					37	0.0	
DKP					19	0.0	0.0
SGP					16	0.0	0.0
Informal votes		1,460			1,128		
Total valid votes		159,165			159,497		
Turnout		160,625	77.9	▲0.5			
SPD gain from CDU	Majority	7,040	4.4				

=== 2017 election ===
Federal election (2017): Wesel I
Notes:	Blue background denotes the winner of the electorate vote. Pink background denotes a candidate elected from their party list. Yellow background denotes an electorate win by a list member, or other incumbent. A ✓ or ✗ denotes status of any incumbent, win or lose respectively.						
Party	Candidate	Votes	%	±%	Party votes	%	±%
CDU	✓ Sabine Weiss	61,849	39.0	▼4.5	53,623	33.7	▼5.6
SPD	Jürgen Preuß	52,085	32.8	▼6.4	45,627	28.7	▼6.2
AfD	Renatus Rieger	13,615	8.6	▲5.6	14,325	9.0	▲5.3
FDP	Bernd Reuther	12,644	8.0	▲6.1	19,709	12.4	▲7.6
Left	Gerd Baßfeld	9,461	6.0	▲1.0	10,637	6.7	▲0.7
Greens	Stefan Meiners	8,763	5.5	▲0.6	9,743	6.1	▼0.3
Tierschutzpartei					1,223	0.8	
PARTEI					1,136	0.7	▲0.3
Pirates					664	0.4	▼1.7
AD-DEMOKRATEN					405	0.3	
FW					380	0.2	0.0
NPD					361	0.2	▼0.9
Gesundheitsforschung					171	0.1	
DiB					159	0.1	
DM					156	0.1	
V-Partei³					148	0.1	
Volksabstimmung					144	0.1	▼0.1
ÖDP					142	0.1	0.0
BGE					132	0.1	
MLPD	Tufan Aydin	264	0.2		121	0.1	▲0.1
Die Humanisten					71	0.0	
DKP					11	0.0	
SGP					10	0.0	0.0
Informal votes		1,663			1,245		
Total valid votes		158,681			159,098		
Turnout		160,344	77.4	▲3.2			
CDU hold	Majority	9,764	6.2	▲1.9			

=== 2013 election ===
Federal election (2013): Wesel I
Notes:	Blue background denotes the winner of the electorate vote. Pink background denotes a candidate elected from their party list. Yellow background denotes an electorate win by a list member, or other incumbent. A ✓ or ✗ denotes status of any incumbent, win or lose respectively.						
Party	Candidate	Votes	%	±%	Party votes	%	±%
CDU	✓ Sabine Weiss	66,172	43.5	▲5.0	59,970	39.3	▲6.2
SPD	Hans-Ulrich Krüger	59,709	39.2	▲0.9	53,249	34.9	▲2.8
Left	Sascha H. Wagner	7,527	4.9	▼2.5	9,091	6.0	▼2.5
Greens	Tom Wagener	7,489	4.9	▼1.7	9,780	6.4	▼2.2
AfD		4,510	3.0		5,678	3.7	
Pirates	Manfred Schramm	3,567	2.3		3,154	2.1	▲0.5
FDP	Thomas Heiske	2,781	1.8	▼5.3	7,224	4.7	▼8.2
NPD					1,646	1.1	▲0.2
PARTEI					643	0.4	
PRO					346	0.2	
FW					295	0.2	
Volksabstimmung					256	0.2	▲0.1
RRP		490	0.3		243	0.2	0.0
REP					229	0.2	▼0.1
Nichtwahler					179	0.1	
ÖDP					158	0.1	0.0
Party of Reason					116	0.1	
BIG					84	0.1	
Die Rechte					39	0.0	
MLPD					36	0.0	0.0
PSG					28	0.0	0.0
BüSo					25	0.0	0.0
Informal votes		1,736			1,512		
Total valid votes		152,245			152,469		
Turnout		153,981	74.2	▲1.3			
CDU hold	Majority	6,463	4.3	▲4.1			

=== 2009 election ===
Federal election (2009): Wesel I
Notes:	Blue background denotes the winner of the electorate vote. Pink background denotes a candidate elected from their party list. Yellow background denotes an electorate win by a list member, or other incumbent. A ✓ or ✗ denotes status of any incumbent, win or lose respectively.						
Party	Candidate	Votes	%	±%	Party votes	%	±%
CDU	Sabine Weiss	57,576	38.5	▼0.6	49,564	33.1	0.0
SPD	✗ Hans-Ulrich Krüger	57,225	38.3	▼10.7	48,139	32.2	▼12.3
Left	Norbert Segerath	11,071	7.4	▲3.5	12,676	8.5	▲3.7
FDP	Thomas Heiske	10,624	7.1	▲3.6	19,441	13.0	▲4.0
Greens	Holger Mrosek	9,873	6.6	▲3.0	12,853	8.6	▲2.3
Pirates					2,336	1.6	
NPD	Daniel Krug	1,569	1.0	▲0.2	1,323	0.9	▲0.2
Tierschutzpartei					969	0.6	▲0.2
FAMILIE	Heiner Christinck	1,583	1.1		923	0.6	▲0.2
RENTNER					446	0.3	
REP					395	0.3	0.0
RRP					187	0.1	
ÖDP					114	0.1	
Volksabstimmung					97	0.1	0.0
DVU					87	0.1	
Centre					86	0.1	0.0
MLPD					30	0.0	0.0
BüSo					28	0.0	0.0
PSG					15	0.0	0.0
Informal votes		1,740			1,553		
Total valid votes		149,521			149,708		
Turnout		149,521	72.9	▼7.4			
CDU gain from SPD	Majority	351	0.2				

=== 2005 election ===
Federal election (2005): Wesel I
Notes:	Blue background denotes the winner of the electorate vote. Pink background denotes a candidate elected from their party list. Yellow background denotes an electorate win by a list member, or other incumbent. A ✓ or ✗ denotes status of any incumbent, win or lose respectively.						
Party	Candidate	Votes	%	±%	Party votes	%	±%
SPD	✓ Hans-Ulrich Krüger	79,615	49.0	▼1.0	72,290	44.5	▼1.6
CDU	Ilse Falcon	63,622	39.2	▲2.0	53,850	33.1	▼0.1
Left	Ulrich Kuklinski	6,301	3.9	▲3.0	7,708	4.7	▲3.8
Greens	Gisela Brick	5,884	3.6	▼1.3	10,209	6.3	▼1.6
FDP	Thomas Heiske	5,716	3.5	▼2.6	14,529	8.9	▼0.5
NPD	Mathias Rochow	1,344	0.8		1,148	0.7	▲0.5
Tierschutzpartei					786	0.5	▲0.1
Familie					675	0.4	▲0.1
REP					474	0.3	
GRAUEN					462	0.3	▲0.2
From Now on... Democracy Through Referendum					125	0.1	
PBC					88	0.1	
MLPD					75	0.0	
Socialist Equality Party					64	0.0	
Centre					54	0.0	
BüSo					29	0.0	0.0
Informal votes		1,975			1,891		
Total valid votes		162,482			162,566		
Turnout		164,457	80.3	▼1.1			
SPD hold	Majority	15,993	9.8				
