= Sochor =

Sochor (Czech feminine: Sochorová) is the surname of the following people:

- Antonín Sochor (1914, Lohberg bei Dinslaken – 1950), a Czech general who fought for the 1st Czechoslovak Army Corps
- Cornelia Sochor (born 1994, Vienna), an Austrian footballer
- Eduard Sochor (Eduard Sochor von Friedrichsthal)

- Eduard Sochor von Friedrichsthal (engineer) (1833, Diváky – 1916), a Moravian-born Czech engineer, railway official, and politician
- Eduard Sochor (architect) (1862, Vlčí u Chlumčan – 1947), a Czech architect
- Eduard Sochor von Friedrichsthal (jurist) (1869, Mödling – 1948), an Austrian jurist and civil servant

- Hilde Sochor, née Hildegard Sochor (1924, Vienna – 2017), an Austrian actress
- Jan Sochor (born 1980, Ústí nad Labem), a Czech ice hockey player
- Jim Sochor (1938, Oklahoma City – 2015), an American football player, coach, and college athletics administrator
- Miloslav Sochor (born 1952, Pec pod Sněžkou), a Czechoslovak Olympic alpine skier
- Patrícia da Silva Sochor, Patrícia Sochor (born 1994, Iguatemi), a Brazilian footballer
- Petra Sochorová, née Blažková (born 1978), a Czech chess player
- Václav Sochor (1855, Schonung (Czech: Obora u Loun) – 1935), a Bohemian painter

== See also ==
- A. Sochor (A. Sochor & Co GmbH), the Austrian building materials trading company (founded 1894), named for Alois Sochor
