= Alfred Grimm =

German artist (1943–2026)

Alfred Grimm (16 June 1943 – 13 January 2026) was a German object artist, sculptor, painter, and draftsman.

== Early life and work ==
Grimm was born in Dinslaken on 16 June 1943. He studied painting and sculpture at the Kunstakademie Düsseldorf under Karl Bobek and Joseph Beuys, among others. He created a new kind of multiples which he called "variation objects". Several of his sculptures serve as commemorative monuments in public space.

A characteristic of Grimm's art is that he repeatedly created series of objects, drawings or paintings with similar motifs. In the object cycle "A Beautiful Piece of Germany" ("Ein schönes Stück Deutschland") Grimm presented on plates artificial pieces of cake of a special kind, which show the viewer bitingly ironic realities from Germany. He also presented miniature landscapes and environments in buckets, bottles, mason jars, tins, books, as well as on chess boards and stones. In his crucifix cycle, real crucifixes were redesigned and provided with additional motifs resulting in critical and sometimes sarcastic statements about the pious religiosity of our day. For his TV series he used dismantled old television sets, in whose housing he created miniature landscapes on various themes.

According to Anna-Louise Mathieu, the instant recognition of Grimm's work "serves as the bait for his insidious trap: no sooner does the esthete, the admirer of the ingenious form flounder in it, than the artist begins to frighten us ... with unsavory details, he sprinkles his cynical observations in between, as if they were chocolate shavings." He illustrates his world view in "miniature environments thinking about the triangular deals regarding the monopoly of power and capital, about ecological murder, military and technological overkill. He breaks down the object of his pangs of conscience into bite-proof pieces, and adds a little joke of the bite-sized kind, so that we don't lose our appetite when we are frustrated." We "recognize ourselves: pushed onto the television set, pulled onto bottles, ... nailed to a chessboard, flushed down the toilet. ... Our register of sins, our common failure gawks at us as an aphorism."

From time to time Grimm's works caused heated discussions. His "Mother Earth Chair" (1995), which shows a landscape with nature, factory chimneys and a tunnel on a gynecologist's chair and draws attention to the destructive human intervention in nature, had been rejected several times at exhibitions because of this object the dignity of the female sex could be sensitively affected and disturbed.

In 1981, Grimm was a co-founder of the Kulturkreis Dinslaken (KKD). He took part in 90 solo exhibitions and 203 group exhibitions in Germany, France, Luxembourg, Switzerland and the USA. So far 11 individual catalogs and 50 joint catalogs as well as over 1200 press articles in Germany and abroad have been published. As of 2019, his work had been reported in nine radio and nineteen TV programs.

On the occasion of Grimm's eightieth birthday, an extensive exhibition of his complete oeuvre was held at the Museum Voswinckelshof in Dinslaken from 20 August to 15 October 2023. Even the museum warned about the provocative works of art shown in this exhibition.

== Personal life and death ==
Grimm lived in Hünxe. He was married to the art teacher and artist Barbara Grimm, who died in 2024. They had two sons and five grandsons.

From 1972 until his retirement in early 2005, Grimm taught art at a German secondary school in Dinslaken. The German-American character animator Andreas Deja was one of Grimm's students. Until his death, Grimm continued to work as a freelance artist, chiefly creating new object series.

Grimm died unexpectedly at his home in Hünxe-Bruckhausen, on 13 January 2026, three days after the completion and submission of a new exhibition piece. He was 82.

== Public works ==
Some public works by Grimm include:

- The object window for the Protestant church "Unsere Arche" in Hünxe–Bruckhausen (1992), which, for the first time in the context of church art, expands traditional stained glass by integrating everyday objects into an object window,
- The large bronze memorial as a reminder of the former Jewish community in Dinslaken (1993),
- The memorial for the Clemens sister Euthymia in the park of St. Vinzenz Hospital in Dinslaken (2001),
- The outdoor sculpture "Road Work Excavation" ("Baustelle") for the sculpture mile in the city of Dinslaken (2002, owned by Stadtwerke Dinslaken),
- The exterior sculpture for the centenary of the company, Steinhoff Kaltwalzen, Dinslaken (2008),
- The outdoor sculptures "memorial stones" to commemorate Jewish citizens from Dinslaken in the commemorative year 2013.

== Gallery ==
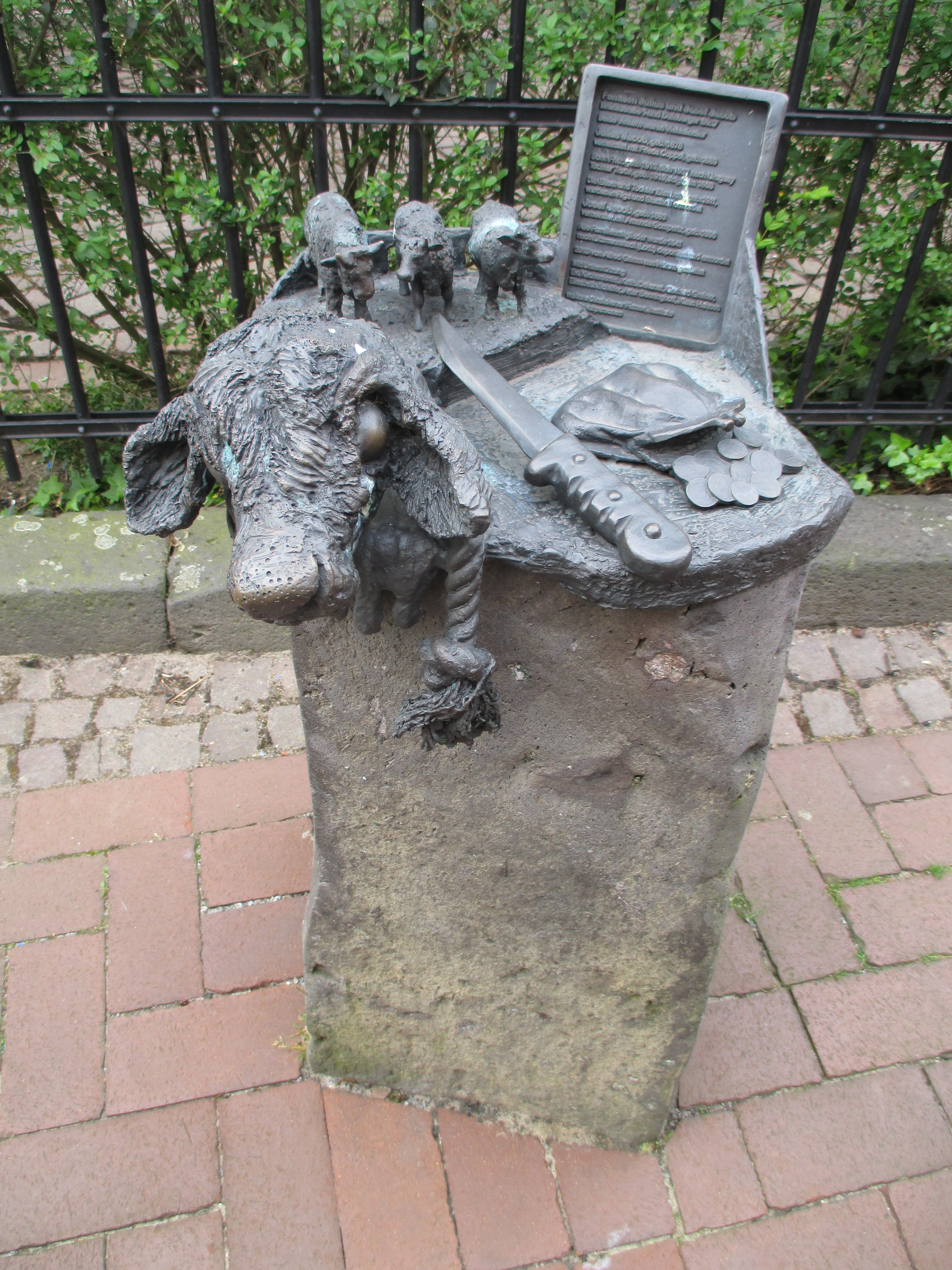
In 2012, Grimm designed four memorial stones for Jewish citizens and their professions. This work is a memorial of the livestock dealers Julius and Josef Jakob. They and their families were deported to Lizmannstadt (Łódź), Poland in 1941 and murdered.

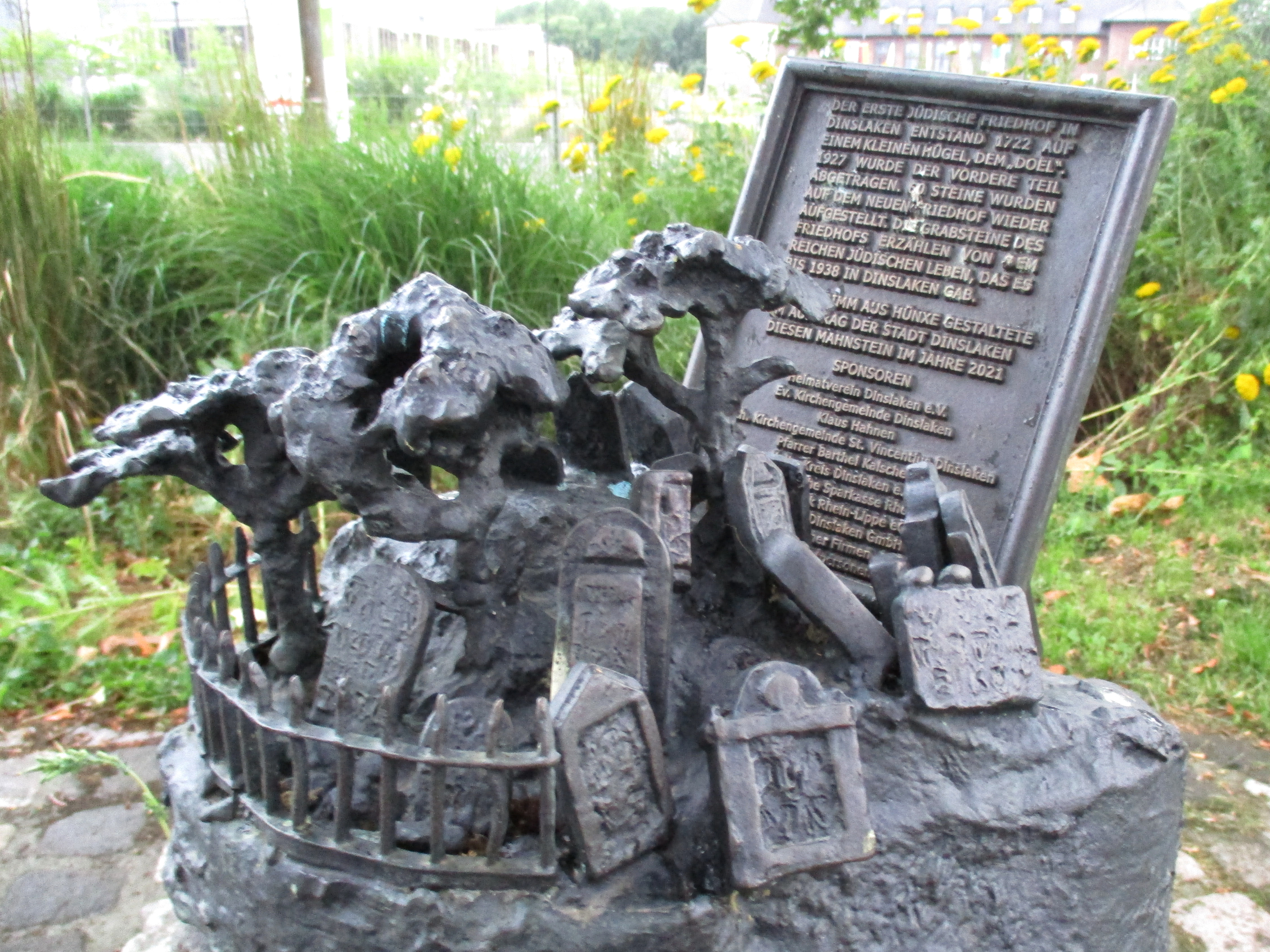
Monument to the old Jewish cemetery on the Doelen (2021) at the Dinslaken city park

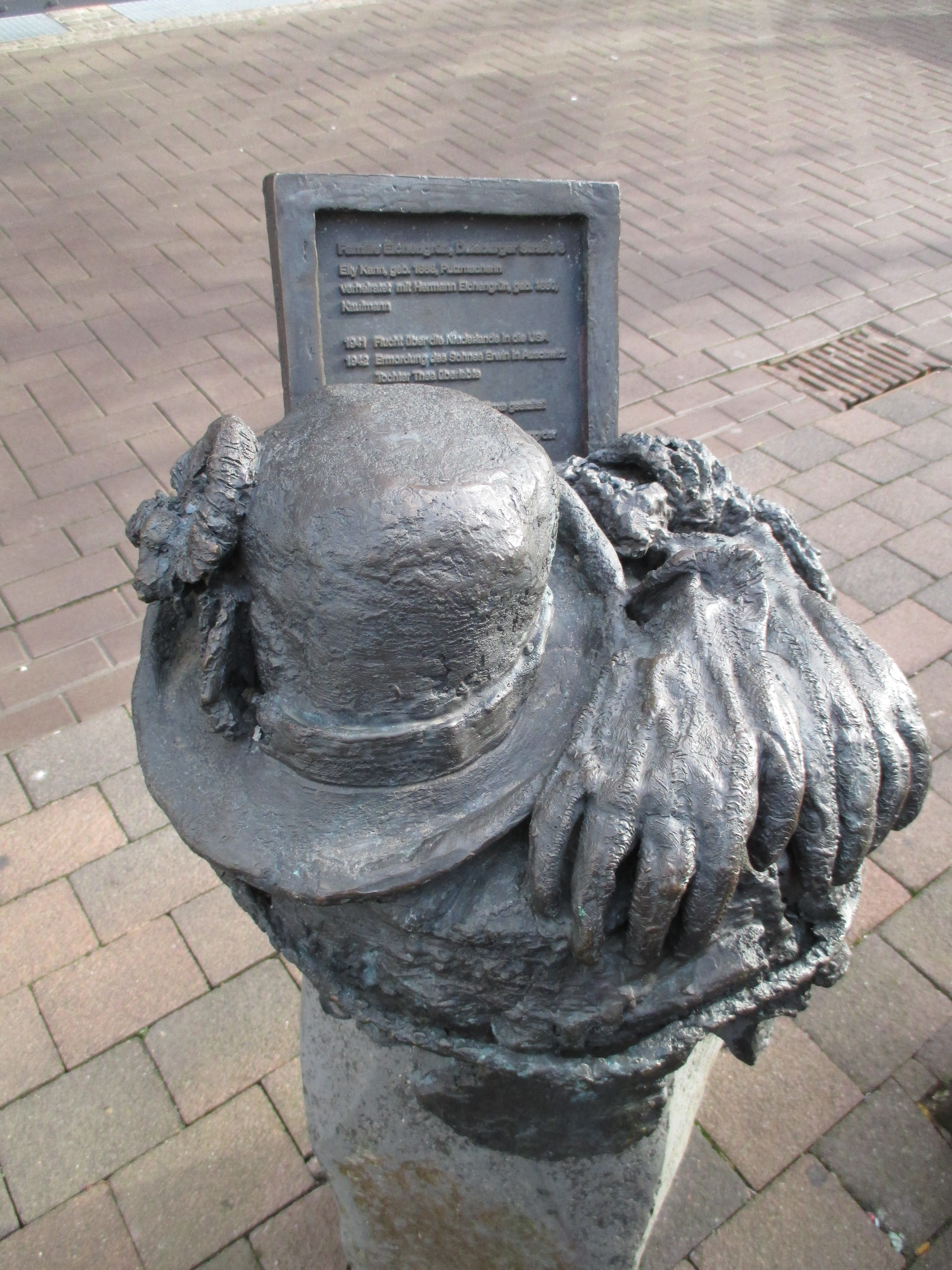
Memorial of Elly Eichelgrün, a hat and milliner. In 1941 she fled to the United States via the Netherlands.

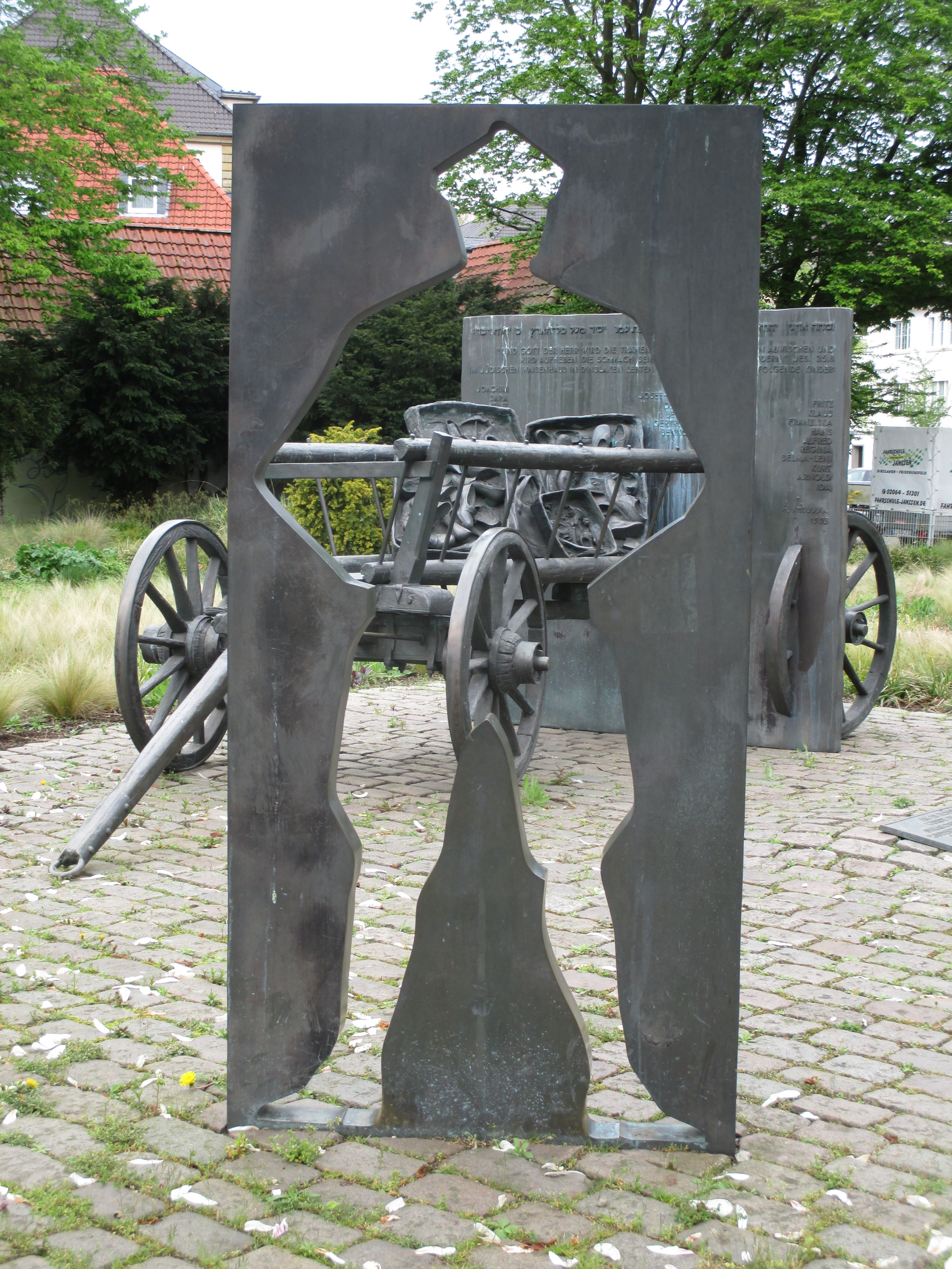
"Memorial of the expulsion of the Jews from Dinslaken" in the city park.

== Bibliography ==
- Klaus Battke / Martin Müller, Alfred Grimm: Zeichnungen, Objekte, Malerei, Dinslaken 1985.
- Karl-Heinz Koch, Alfred Grimm: Zeichnungen, Objekte, Malerei, Emmerich 1988.
- Ralf Schreiner, Objektfenster "Unsere Arche", Hünxe 1992.
- Anna-Louise Mathieu, Alfred Grimm: Bilder, Objekte, Rees 1992.
- Alfred Grimm: Kleine Eräugnisse, Objekte und Bilder, Berlin 1993.
- Alfred Grimm: Bilder, Objekte, Dinslaken 1996.
- Anna-Louise Mathieu, Werner Arand and Bernd Krysmanski, Alfred Grimm: Kunst-Baum-Kunst, Wesel 1997.
- Joachim Schneider, Alfred Grimm: Alltätlichkeiten, Bilder und Objekte, Rees 1998.
- Joachim Schneider, Alfred Grimm: Serien.Folgen.Reihen, Dinslaken 2007.
- Bernd Krysmanski, Alfred Grimm: "Grimms Mädchen", Wesel 2008.
- Bernd Krysmanski, Alfred Grimm: Kruzifix-Objekte, Kamp-Lintfort 2015.
