= Sascha van Beek =

German politician (born 1983)

Member of the Bundestag
- Assuming office 25 March 2025
- Succeeding: Rainer Keller
- Constituency: Wesel I

Personal details
- Born: 16 June 1983 (age 43)
- Party: Christian Democratic Union (since 2006)
- Education: University of South Wales

Sascha van Beek (born 16 June 1983) is a German nurse and politician of the Christian Democratic Union (CDU) who has been serving as a member of the Bundestag since the 2025 elections, representing the Wesel I electoral district.

== Early life and education ==
Van Beek holds a Master of Science degree in disaster healthcare from University of South Wales.

== Political career ==
Van Beek has served as chairman of the CDU in Alpen since 2016.

In parliament, van Beek has been serving on the Health Committee and the Committee on the Environment, Climate Action, Nature Conservation and Nuclear Safety. In addition to his committee assignments, he is a member of the Parliamentary Advisory Council on Sustainable Development and Future-Related Matters.
