= Antonín Sochor =

Czech general (1914–1950)

- Born: 16 July 1914 Lohberg, German Empire
- Died: 16 August 1950 (aged 36) Jablonné v Podještědí, Czechoslovakia
- Rank: Major general
- Conflicts: World War II
- Awards: Hero of the Soviet Union; Czechoslovak War Cross

Major general Antonín Sochor (16 July 1914 – 16 August 1950) was a Czech general who fought for the 1st Czechoslovak Army Corps in the Soviet Union on the Eastern Front.

== Biography ==
=== Early life ===
Antonín Sochor was born in the mining town of Lohberg, German Empire into the family of a Czech miner.

Sochor could not complete the business academy in Teplice and in 1933 he became a laborer. In October 1936 he began full-time military service in Trenčín. Two years later, he graduated from the non-commissioned officer school there.

He was mobilized to serve in Slovakia and remained in the army as a long-serving non-commissioned officer. After the Nazi invasion of Czechoslovakia and the creation of the Protectorate, he returned to Duchcov, but was arrested there after a conflict with the Sudeten German Party. In May 1939 he was interned in the Bitterfeld labor camp near Leipzig. In the factory where he worked, he managed to carry out several sabotages. In order to get out of the labor camp and thus beyond suspicion, he applied to enter the German Wehrmacht, and as a German native, also living in the Sudetenland, he was deported. He was given a short vacation to complete the formalities and went to Duchcov, from where he came, and, despite the Gestapo's supervision, managed to go into Poland for exile, before he managed to throw the Nazi mayor of Kutscher-Hasslinger into a pond. In the summer of 1939, he joined the Czechoslovak Military Group under the command of Ludvík Svoboda, commonly known as the Czechoslovak Legion.

=== World War II ===
After the outbreak of World War II on 1 September 1939, the Czechoslovak Legion was interned in the Soviet Union and many of its members were sent to labor camps.

He was among the first who in February 1942 joined the 1st separate Czechoslovak battalion. In March 1943 he was the commander of a platoon of submachine gunners, lieutenant.

He particularly distinguished himself in the battles for the capital of Ukraine in the city of Kiev. On 5 November 1943, when the 1st separate Czechoslovak infantry brigade launched an attack on Kiev, Lieutenant Antonin Sochor commanded a company of submachine gunners, which, like a tank landing, acted in the vanguard of the brigade. Overcoming enemy resistance, Sochor's company contributed to the capture of the bridge prepared for the explosion on the Zhytomyr highway and access to the near outskirts of Kiev from the side of the Syrets farm.

By decree of the Presidium of the Supreme Soviet of the Soviet Union of 21 December 1943, for the skillful command of a company and the heroism and courage shown, the citizen of Czechoslovakia, Lieutenant Antonín Sochor, was awarded the title of Hero of the Soviet Union with the Order of Lenin.

In 1944 and 1945 he took part in the battles near Belaya Tserkov and Zhashkov. When the 1st Czechoslovak Army Corps was created in the spring of 1944, he took part in the Carpathian-Dukla operation of the troops of the 1st Ukrainian Front, and fought in Slovakia and Moravia until the complete liberation of Czechoslovakia from the Nazi invaders. In one of the attacks on the heavily fortified elevation, he was severely wounded on 14 September 1944. He managed to evacuate to the hospital in Odrzykon, where 218 shards were removed from his body. He then spent three months in convalescence. After further treatment, he worked in staff positions and ended the war with the rank of staff captain.

=== Post war and death ===
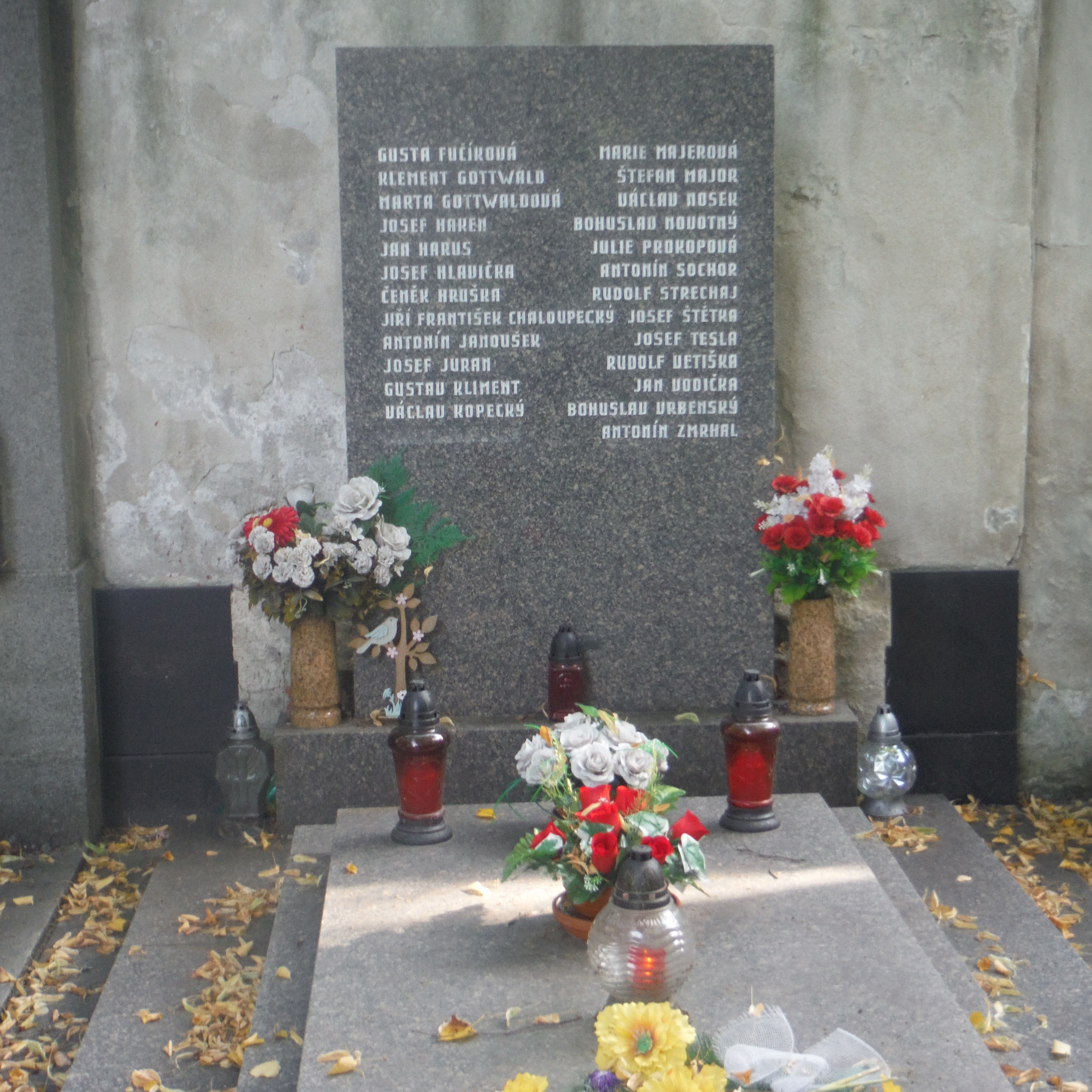
Olšany Cemetery, grave of Czech Communist politicians whose urns had originally been kept at the National Monument at Vítkov

After the liberation of Czechoslovakia he continued his service in the army. From August to December 1948 he was commander of a brigade of Jewish volunteers in training for the Israeli Defense Forces in Central Moravia. In September 1949 he was appointed professor of the infantry school in Milovice near Prague and at the same time commander of the school of middle commanders. On 1 July 1950, he was promoted to lieutenant colonel.

On the night of 16 August 1950, in the military training area of Mimoň, near the village of Hamr na Jezeře near Stohánek, a heavy paratrooper military truck collided with Lieutenant Colonel Sochor's Škoda 1101 VO paratrooper heavy truck and he was severely injured in the crash.

His funeral took place on 21 August 1950, with a procession from the Liberation Memorial in Prague-Žižkov to the Prague-Strašnice crematorium, where the remains of the deceased were cremated. After cremation, his remains were buried at the Jan Žižka National Monument at Vítkov. In 1990, his ashes were moved to Olšany Cemetery, together with those of about 20 other communist leaders which had also originally been placed in the Jan Žižka National Monument.

Antonín Sochor's death is still fraught with some ambiguity. Many people have been and are convinced that it was not an accident, but a carefully planned assassination. He became uncomfortable with some of the powerful people of the new regime, especially Bedřich Reicin. When Sochor was returning from Israel in 1949, his plane was attacked by an unidentified fighter during a flight and had to make an emergency landing in Malta. This was later referred to as the first assassination attempt on Sochor. His son Ludvík also confirmed that they were striving for his life, stating in his memoirs that his father had talked to his mother that his car had been shot twice, that they wanted to kill him and that he would no longer take a step without a loaded submachine gun. It has been also said that doctors were informed deliberately about his injuries after the crash, however the then chief physician of the airborne battalion in Stráž pod Ralskem, Zdeněk Klouček, stated that Sochor's injuries were so serious that it would not be possible to save his life even by today's means.

== Memory ==
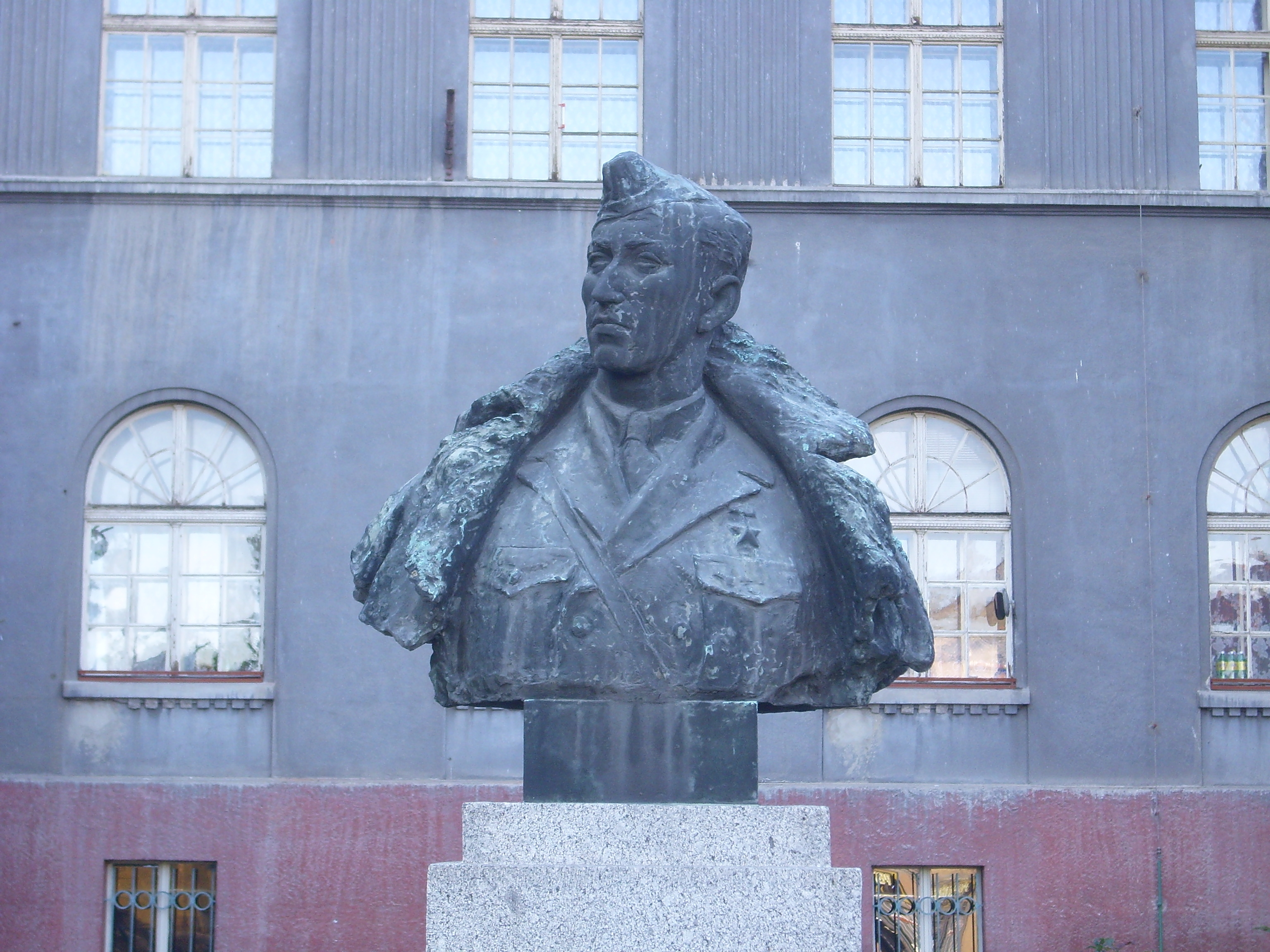
Monument of Antonín Sochor in Duchcov

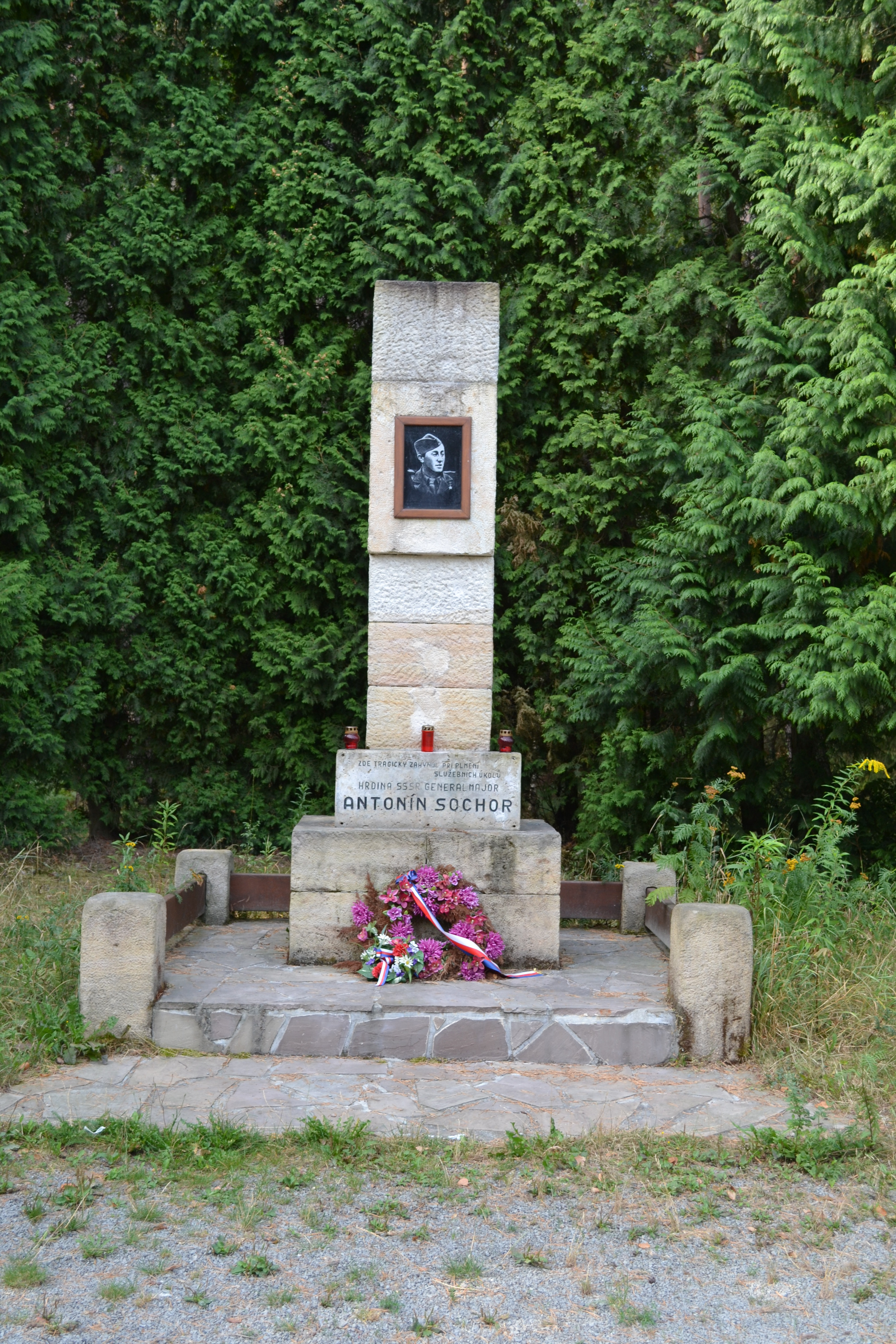
Monument of Sochor at the scene of his accident

On 6 October 1955, Colonel Antonín Sochor was promoted to the rank of Major General in memoriam.

Since 1994, the urn with his ashes has been placed in the family grave in Dobříš next to his wife Štěpánka.

His busts are located in Duchcov in front of primary school, in Stráž pod Ralskem in front of the primary school, in Milovice in front of the former military school, and at the honorary burial ground at the Dukelský memorial.

A monument was built at the site of his tragic accident near the natural monument Stohánek u Hamru na Jezeře, in which an urn with his ashes was placed until 1955.

The Mother-Motherland monument in Kyiv lists his name among other heroes of the Soviet Union.

Streets in Brandýs nad Labem, Kutná Hora, Most, Nymburk, Olomouc, Oloví, Ostrava, Prague, Tábor, Teplice, Třebíč, Vyškov, Kharkiv and Buzuluk are named after him. A kindergarten in Most and a primary school in Duchcov also bear his name.

The Antonín Sochor Memorial is held in Stráž pod Ralskem every year.

In the film Sokolovo by director Otakar Vávra, he played the character of a lieutenant. Sochor was player by the actor Rudolf Jelínek.

== Awards ==
=== Titles ===
- Hero of the Soviet Union (Soviet Union)

=== Orders ===
- Czechoslovak War Cross, awarded four times (Czechoslovakia)
- Order of the White Lion (Czechoslovakia)
- Order of the Slovak National Uprising (Czechoslovakia)
- Order of Lenin (Soviet Union)
- Order of the Red Banner (Soviet Union)
- Order of the Virtuti Militari 5th Class - Silver Ribbon (Poland)
- Order of the Star of Romania(Romania)
- Order of the Crown, 5th Class (Romania)
- Order for Service of the Nation, 1st degree (Yugoslavia)

=== Medals ===
- Two Czechoslovak medal for bravery against the enemy (Czechoslovakia)
- Medal of Merit, 2nd degree (Czechoslovakia)
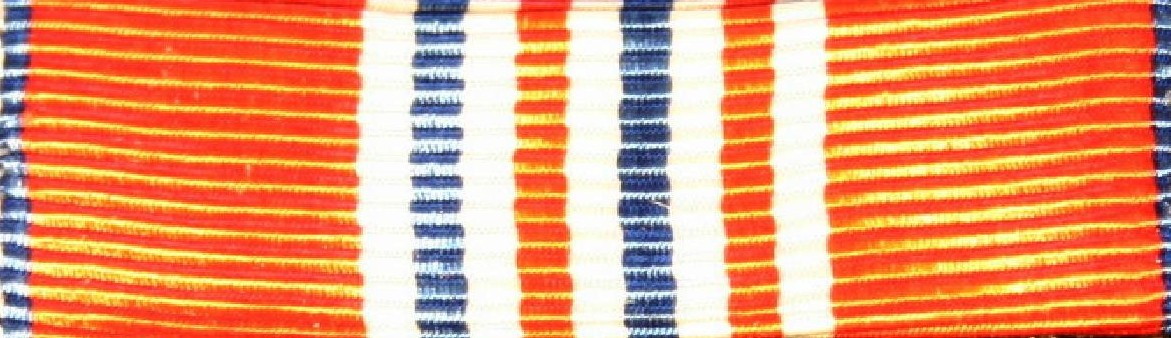
- Sokolovská commemorative medal, (Czechoslovakia)
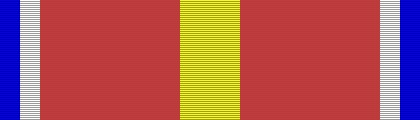
- Dukel Memorial Medal (Czechoslovakia)
- Commemorative medal of the Czechoslovak army abroad (Czechoslovakia)
- Junácký kříž Za vlast 1939–1945, 2nd degree (Czechoslovakia)
- Honorary badge for war college graduates (Czechoslovakia)
- Medal for Victory Over Germany 1941–1945 (Soviet Union)
- Medal For the Liberation of Prague (Soviet Union)
