= Bucholtwelmen =

Coordinates: 51°37′29″N 6°42′36″E

Bucholtwelmen is a district in the west of the community Hünxe in North Rhine-Westphalia, Germany, with 474 inhabitants and is located near the river Lippe and the Wesel-Datteln Canal. The district consists of the villages of Bucholt and Welmen, the centers of which are 3 km apart.

== History ==
Archaeologists have uncovered the remains of houses in Bucholtwelmen that were built around 2500 years ago. The district used to belong to the Duchy of Cleves, most recently the formerly independent municipality was part of the district Gahlen.
