= Hünxe-Bruckhausen =

Bruckhausen is a district of the municipality of Hünxe in the district of Wesel on the Lower Rhine in North Rhine-Westphalia. The district was shaped by mining for many years.

== Geography ==
Geographically, Bruckhausen is an independent village, located about 5 km north of Dinslaken and 6 km south of Hünxe, with currently 4,004 residents. The area of the district is 2011.7 ha. Bruckhausen is flowed through by the Mühlenbach (also known as Möllebeck called). To the west of the settlement are the lake Tenderingsseen created by gravel works. To the east of the district, slag heaps were created by the hard coal mining of the Zeche Lohberg.
