= Dinslaken-Lohberg =

Coordinates: 51°35′02″N 6°45′23″E

Lohberg is one of seven subdivisions of Dinslaken, a city located at the northwestern margin of the Ruhr area. Lohberg is mainly known for its now closed coal mine Zeche Lohberg.

== History ==
Lohberg was built between 1907 and 1924 based on the architectural concept of a garden city in order to accommodate the miners and other employees of the Zeche Lohberg. Subsequent plans to expand Lohberg were dropped.

=== Zeche Lohberg ===
In order to supply Dinslaken's ironworks with coke the industrialists Fritz Thyssen, Joseph Thyssen, August Thyssen as well as the assessor Arthur Jacob founded the mining corporation Lohberg on December 30, 1905. In 1907 sinking of the shafts Lohberg 1 and Lohberg 2 began at the country road between Dinslaken and Hünxe.

During the course of time the coal mine expanded: new shafts were sunk, workers from Korea, Yugoslavia and Turkey were hired; and the capacity increased, until it reached its maximum in 1979 with 3,135,415 tons of coal.

The mine was closed on January 1, 2006. The remaining 1,400 workers were hired by other coal mines or went into retirement.

== Demography ==
As of December 31, 2009, Lohberg had 6,000 residents. Because of the high number of Gastarbeiter at the coal mine, approximately 40% of them have a Turkish background.
