= Rainer Keller =

German politician (1965–2022)

Rainer Keller (4 December 1965 – 22 September 2022) was a German politician from the SPD who served as a Member of the Bundestag from 2021 until his death.

== Life and politics ==
Keller was born in 1965 in the West German town of Hünxe (back then named 'Drevenack'). In 1991 he did his civilian service as a paramedic in Essen at Arbeiter-Samariter-Bund e.V. He kept on working as a paramedic and did training as a nurse in 1996. Since 1984 he was a member of Jusos and helped organize local events in Wesel. 2017 he started focusing his political work on the SPD. He was directly elected to the Bundestag in the 2021 German federal election in the Wesel I constituency.

He died in September 2022 and was replaced in the Bundestag by Daniel Rinkert.
