= Bernd Reuther =

German politician

Member of the Bundestag
- In office 2017–2025

Personal details
- Born: 2 May 1971 (age 55) Wesel, West Germany (now Germany)
- Party: FDP
- Education: University of Duisburg
- Occupation: 1

Bernd Reuther (born 1 May 1971) is a German politician of the Free Democratic Party (FDP) who served as a member of the Bundestag from the state of North Rhine-Westphalia from 2017 to 2025.

== Early life and education ==
After graduating from high school in 1990, Reuther completed his military service with the 110 Supply Battalion in Rheine and subsequently studied social sciences at University of Duisburg until 1998.

== Early career ==
Reuther then worked for a year as a research assistant to Minister of State Werner Hoyer and later as chief of staff to Günter Rexrodt at his parliamentary office in Berlin. From 2003 to 2006, Reuther served as deputy government spokesman of the state government of Saxony-Anhalt under Minister-President Wolfgang Böhmer.

From 2006 until 2009, Reuther was an Associate Director at Hill+Knowlton Strategies in Berlin. In 2009, he first became department head at Duisburger Hafen AG and two years later at Hochtief in Essen. He held this position until he moved to the German Bundestag in 2017.

== Political career ==
Reuther joined the FDP in 1990. He became a member of the Bundestag in the 2017 German federal election. In parliament, he was a member of the Committee on Transport and Digital Infrastructure. In addition to his committee assignments, he was part of the German-Brazilian Parliamentary Friendship Group.

== Other activities ==
- Federal Network Agency for Electricity, Gas, Telecommunications, Posts and Railway (BNetzA), Alternate Member of the Rail Infrastructure Advisory Council (since 2022)
- Deutsche Bahn, Member of the Supervisory Board (2022–2024)
