= Hünxe =

- Municipality
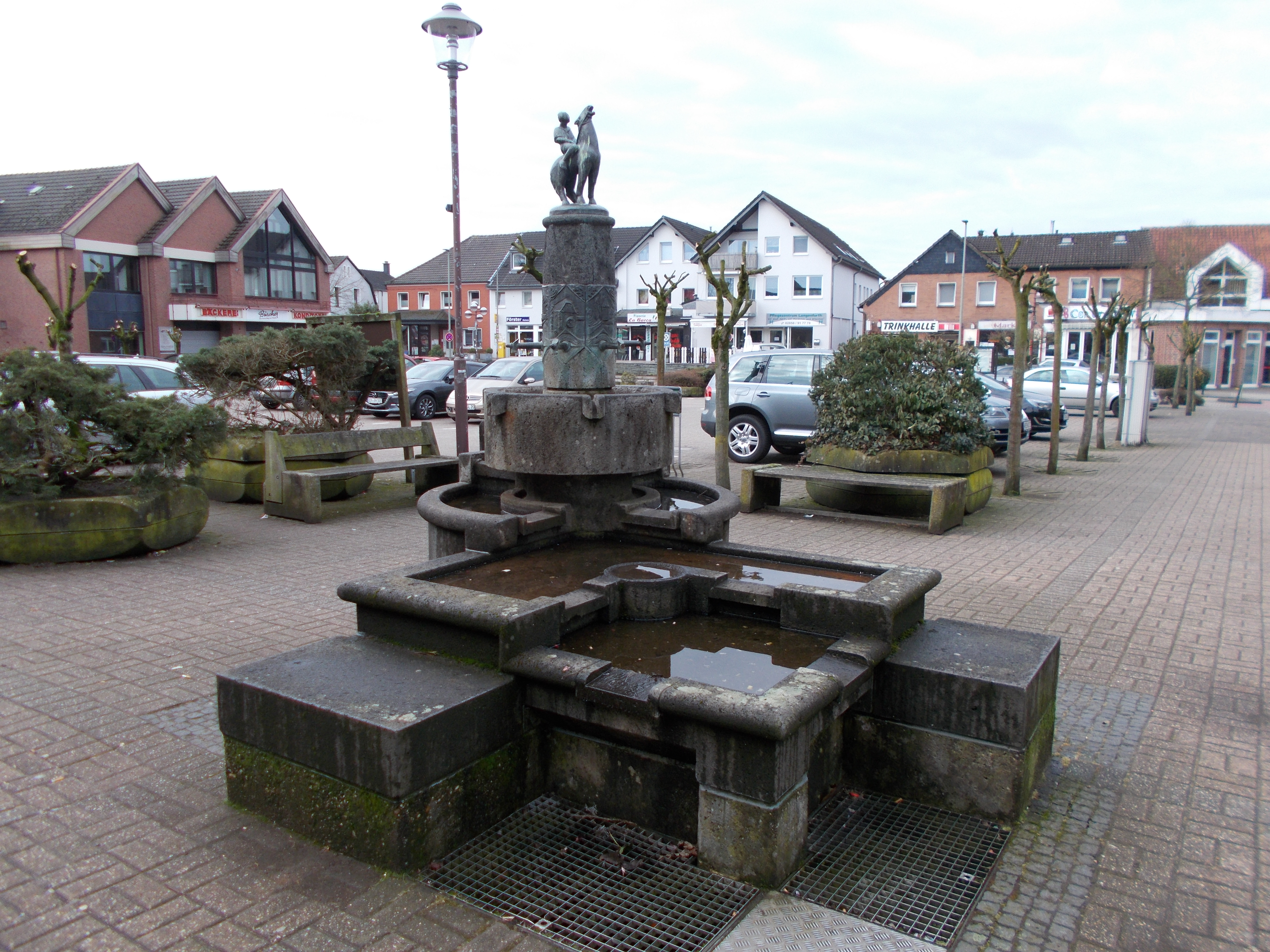

- Flag Coat of arms

- Location of Hünxe within Wesel district
- Interactive map of Hünxe
- Location within Germany Location within North Rhine-Westphalia
- Coordinates: 51°38′30″N 6°46′2″E
- Country: Germany
- State: North Rhine-Westphalia
- Admin. region: Düsseldorf
- District: Wesel
- Subdivisions: 6

Government
  - Mayor (2020–25): Dirk Buschmann

Area
  - Total: 106.86 km^{2} (41.26 sq mi)
- Elevation: 35 m (115 ft)

Population (2025-12-31)
  - Total: 13,527
  - Density: 126.59/km^{2} (327.86/sq mi)
- Time zone: UTC+01:00 (CET)
  - Summer (DST): UTC+02:00 (CEST)
- Postal codes: 46569
- Dialling codes: 02858, 02064, 0281, 02853, 02855, 02856
- Vehicle registration: WES
- Website: www.huenxe.de

Hünxe (German pronunciation: [ˈhʏŋksə]) is a municipality in the district of Wesel, in North Rhine-Westphalia, Germany. It is part of the Rhine-Waal euroregion

== Geography ==
Hünxe is located approximately 10 km east of Wesel and 9 km north of Dinslaken. The neighbouring municipalities are: Schermbeck, Dorsten, Bottrop, Dinslaken, Voerde, Wesel und Hamminkeln. The most part of the municipality belongs to the natural park Hohe Mark. The river Lippe and the Wesel–Datteln Canal cross the municipality.

=== Area ===
The municipality of Hünxe spans over an area of 106,80 km^{2}. It is divided into the six subdivisions of Hünxe, Bruckhausen, Bucholtwelmen, Drevenack, Gartrop-Bühl and Krudenburg.

== Population ==
Historical population

| Year | Pop. | ±% p.a. |
|---|---|---|
| 1965 | 8,184 | — |
| 1970 | 9,247 | +2.47% |
| 1975 | 11,930 | +5.23% |
| 1980 | 12,206 | +0.46% |
| 1985 | 11,752 | −0.76% |
| 1990 | 12,959 | +1.97% |
| 1995 | 13,632 | +1.02% |

| Year | Pop. | ±% p.a. |
|---|---|---|
| 2000 | 13,610 | −0.03% |
| 2005 | 13,831 | +0.32% |
| 2010 | 13,591 | −0.35% |
| 2015 | 13,771 | +0.26% |
| 2020 | 13,596 | −0.26% |
| 2025 | 13,527 | −0.10% |

Source: Landesdatabank Nordrhein-Westfalen

== People ==
- Alfred Grimm (1943–2026), German artist
- Rainer Keller (1965–2022), German politician (SPD)
- Jacob Riegel (born 2004), German racing driver
