= Sabine Weiss (politician) =

German politician

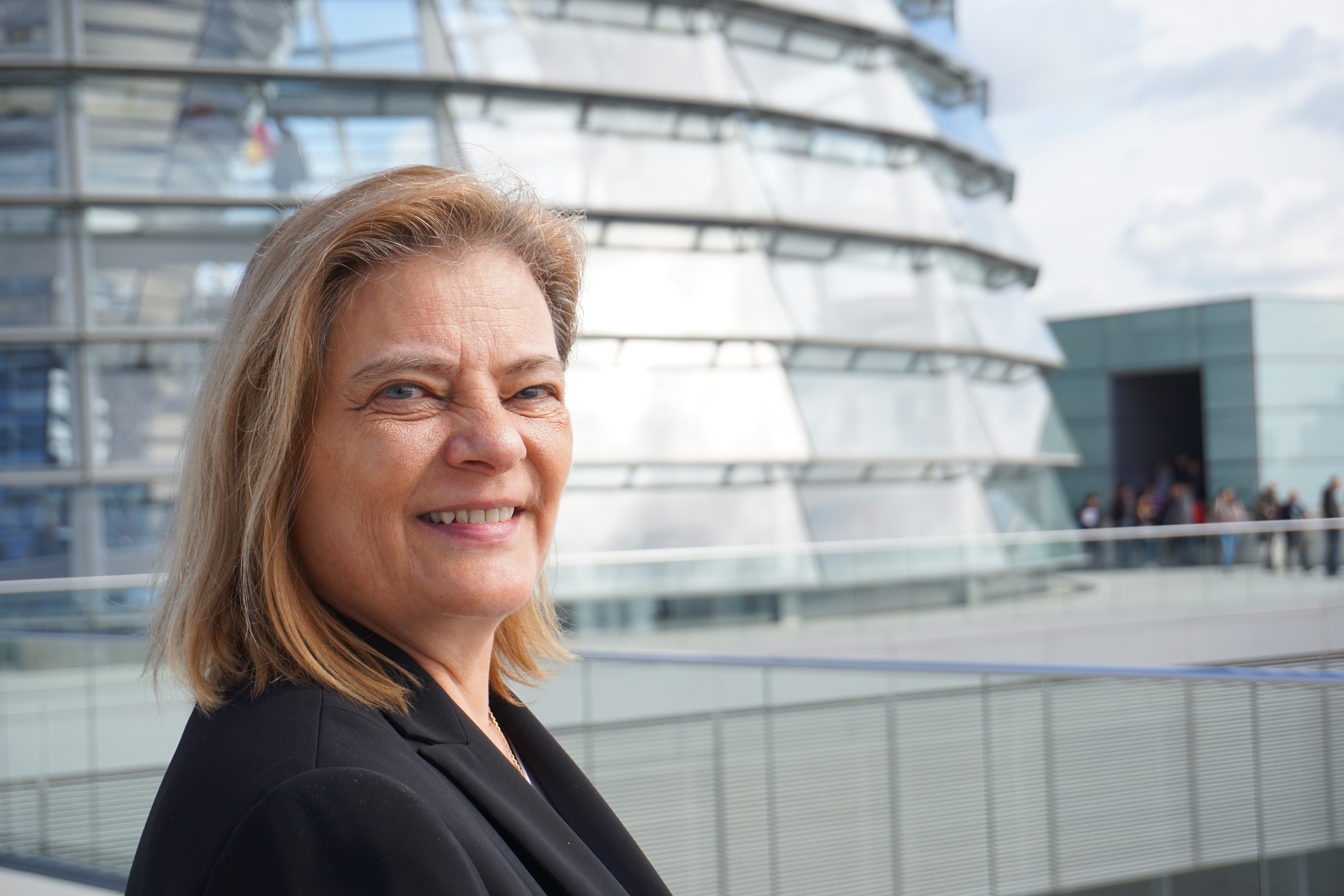
- Weiss in 2017

Member of the Bundestag
- Incumbent
- Assumed office 2009
- Preceded by: Hans-Ulrich Krüger

Personal details
- Born: 26 May 1958 (age 68) Duisburg, West Germany (now Germany)
- Party: CDU
- Education: Ruhr University Bochum

Sabine Katharina Weiss (born 26 May 1958) is a German lawyer and politician of the Christian Democratic Union (CDU) who has been serving as a member of the Bundestag from the state of North Rhine-Westphalia since 2009.

In addition to her parliamentary mandate, Weiss served as Parliamentary State Secretary at the Federal Ministry of Health under minister Jens Spahn in the government of Chancellor Angela Merkel from 2018 until 2021.

== Early life and career ==
Born in Duisburg, North Rhine-Westphalia, Weiss studied law at Ruhr University Bochum.

== Political career ==
Weiss first became a member of the Bundestag in the 2009 German federal election. In her first term from 2009 until 2013, she served on the Committee on Petitions; the Committee on Economic Cooperation and Development; the Subcommittee on Health in Developing Countries; and the Subcommittee on Civilian Crisis Prevention.

In the negotiations to form a Grand Coalition of Chancellor Angela Merkel's Christian Democrats (CDU together with the Bavarian CSU) and the SPD following the 2013 federal elections, Weiss was part of the CDU/CSU delegation in the working group on families, women and equality, led by Annette Widmann-Mauz and Manuela Schwesig. From 2014 until 2018, she was one of the deputy chairs of the CDU/CSU parliamentary group, under the leadership of chairman Volker Kauder.

In the coalition talks following the 2017 federal elections, Weiss was part of the working group on social affairs, this time led Andrea Nahles, Karl-Josef Laumann and Barbara Stamm. From 2018 until 2021, she served (alongside Thomas Gebhart) as one of two Parliamentary State Secretaries to the Federal Minister for Health Jens Spahn.

Since leaving government, Weiss has been serving on the Committee on Human Rights and Humanitarian Aid. In addition to his committee assignments, she has been a member of the German delegation to the Parliamentary Assembly of the Council of Europe (PACE) since 2022. In the Assembly, she serves on the Committee on Migration, Refugees and Displaced Persons.

In 2024 Weiss announced that she is not seeking re-election for Bundestag.

== Other activities ==
- German Foundation for World Population (DSW), Member of the Parliamentary Advisory Board (–2021)
- Rotary International, Member

== Political positions ==
In June 2017, Weiss voted against her parliamentary group’s majority and in favor of Germany’s introduction of same-sex marriage.

In 2019, Weiss joined 14 members of her parliamentary group who, in an open letter, called for the party to rally around Merkel and party chairwoman Annegret Kramp-Karrenbauer amid criticism voiced by conservatives Friedrich Merz and Roland Koch.

In January 2025, Weiss was one of 12 CDU lawmakers who opted not to back a draft law on tightening immigration policy sponsored by their own leader Friedrich Merz, who had pushed for the law despite warnings from party colleagues that he risked being tarnished with the charge of voting alongside the far-right Alternative for Germany.

== Recognition ==
- 2016 – Paul Harris Fellowship
