= Schermbeck =

- Municipality
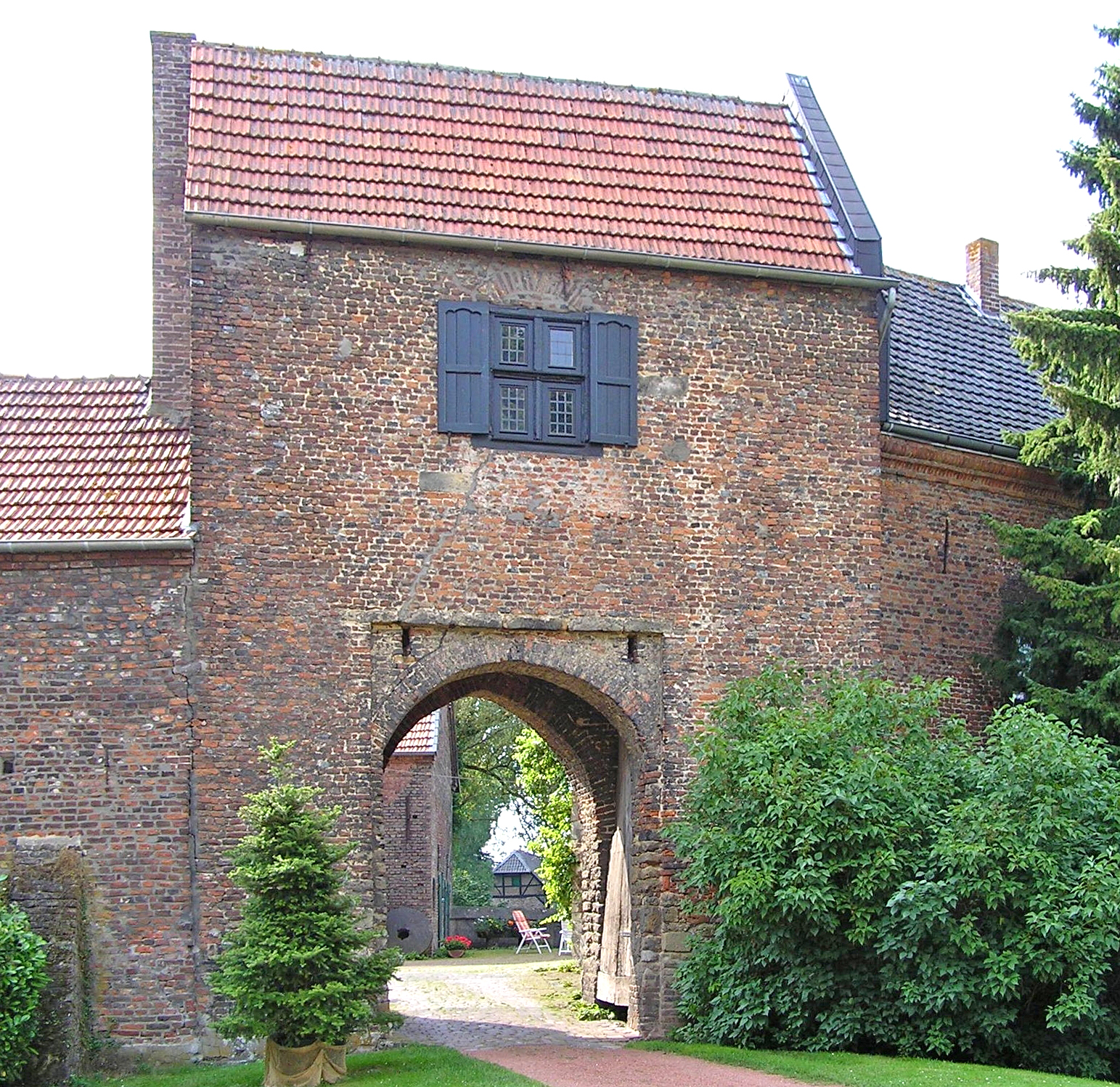
- Castle Schermbeck

- Coat of arms

- Location of Schermbeck within Wesel district
- Interactive map of Schermbeck
- Location within Germany Location within North Rhine-Westphalia
- Coordinates: 51°41′42″N 6°52′32″E
- Country: Germany
- State: North Rhine-Westphalia
- Admin. region: Düsseldorf
- District: Wesel
- Subdivisions: 8

Government
  - Mayor (2020–25): Mike Rexforth (CDU)

Area
  - Total: 110.71 km^{2} (42.75 sq mi)
- Elevation: 27 m (89 ft)

Population (2025-12-31)
  - Total: 13,393
  - Density: 120.97/km^{2} (313.32/sq mi)
- Time zone: UTC+01:00 (CET)
  - Summer (DST): UTC+02:00 (CEST)
- Postal codes: 46514
- Dialling codes: 0 28 53
- Vehicle registration: WES
- Website: www.schermbeck.de

Schermbeck (German pronunciation: [ˈʃɛʁmˌbɛk]) is a municipality in the district of Wesel, in North Rhine-Westphalia, Germany.

== Geography ==
Schermbeck is situated near the river Lippe, approximately 20 km east of Wesel, and 8 km north-west of Dorsten. Its maximum dilatation from north to south is about 12.90 km, from west to east it's about 17.80 km. Thanks to its proximity to the Ruhr area and thus to many big cities, Schermbeck is becoming a popular place for people who want to escape the urban life but still be closely connected to it.

== Population ==
Historical population

Year	Pop.	±% p.a.
1965	7,521	—
1970	8,981	+3.61%
1975	10,573	+3.32%
1980	11,946	+2.47%
1985	11,914	−0.05%
1990	12,459	+0.90%
1995	13,094	+1.00%

Year	Pop.	±% p.a.
2000	13,583	+0.74%
2005	13,687	+0.15%
2010	13,683	−0.01%
2015	13,635	−0.07%
2020	13,541	−0.14%
2025	13,393	−0.22%

Source: Landesdatabank Nordrhein-Westfalen

== Gallery ==
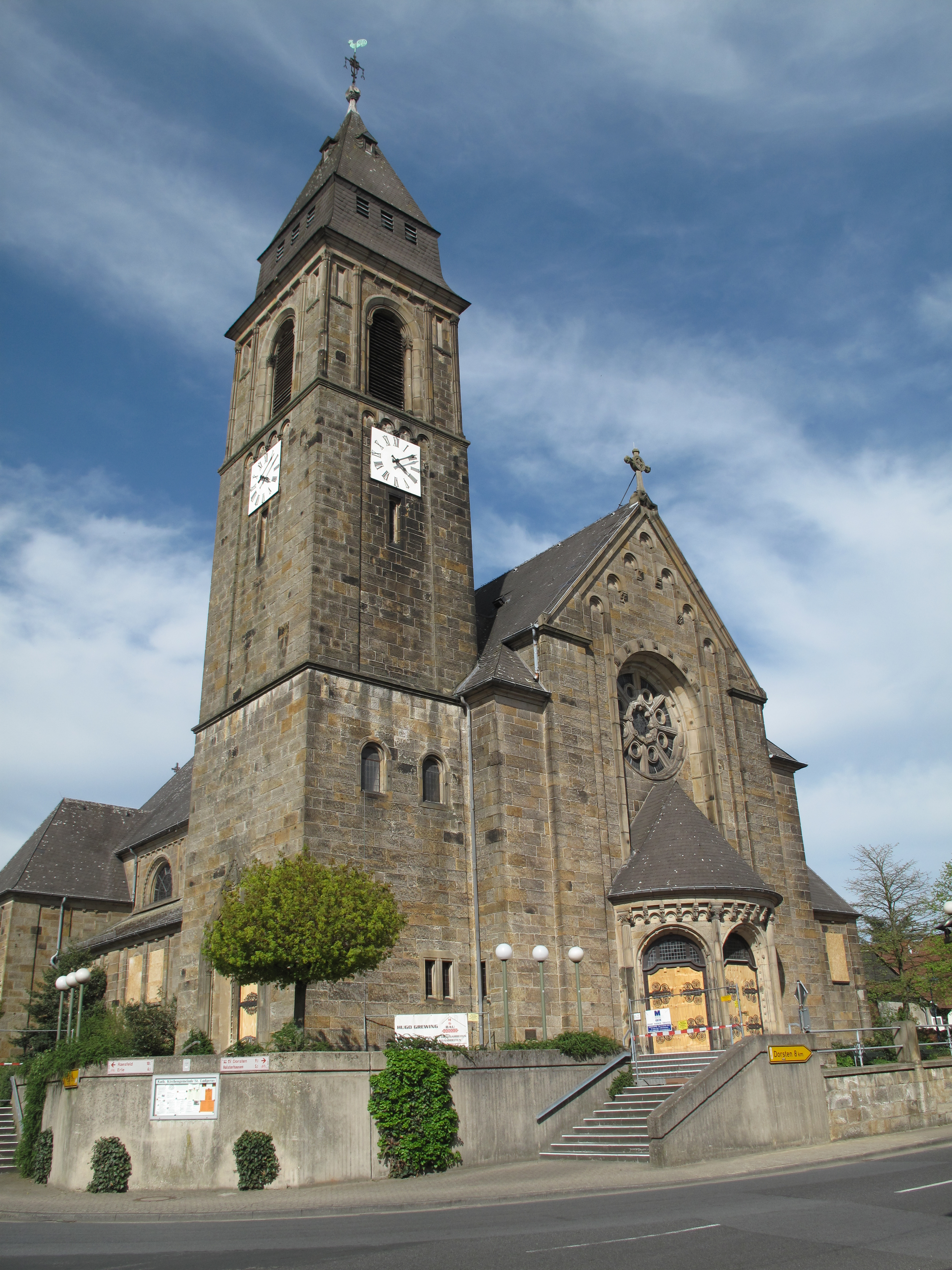
Schermbeck, church: Sankt Ludgeruskirche

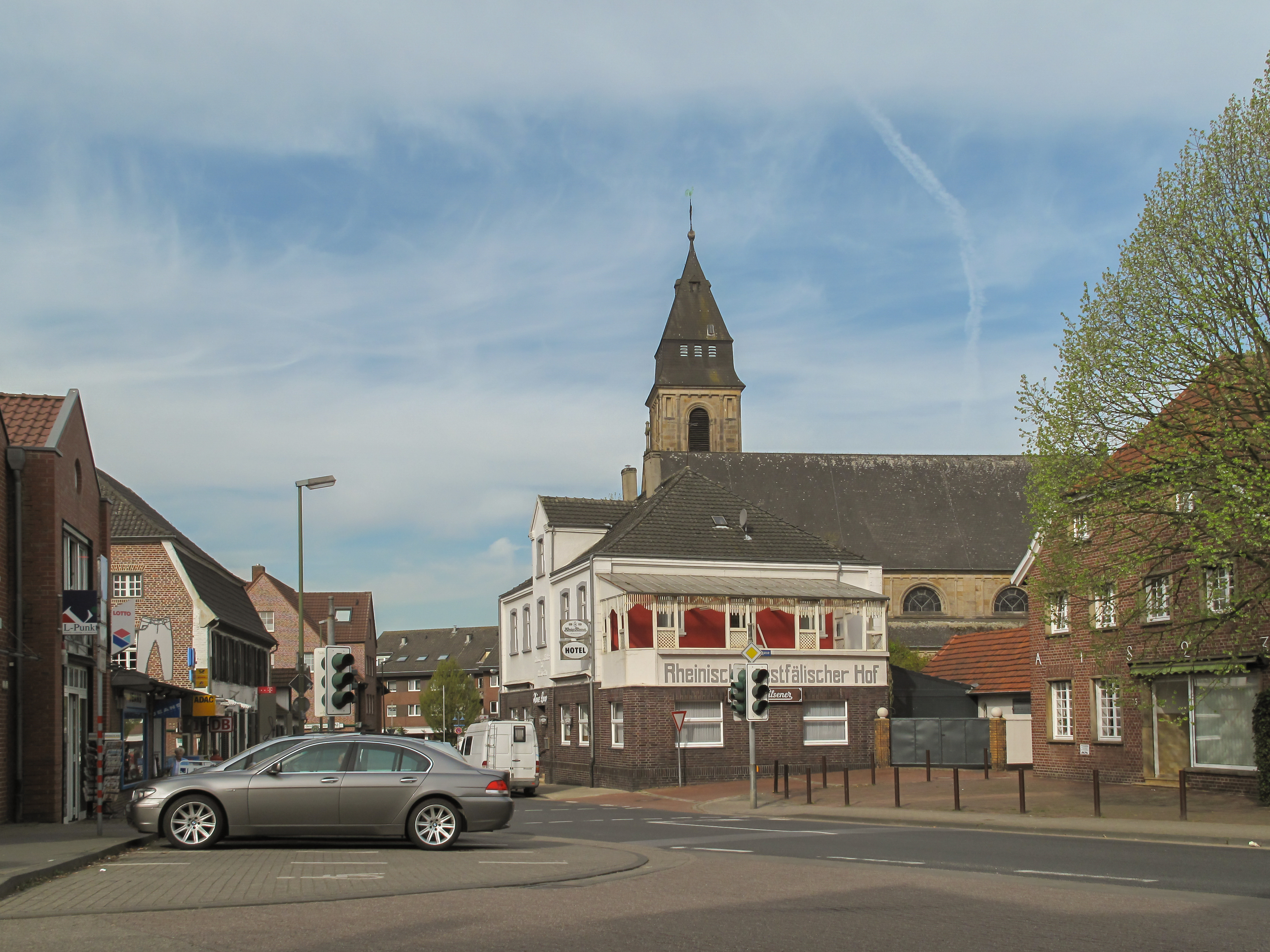
Schermbeck, view to a street with church

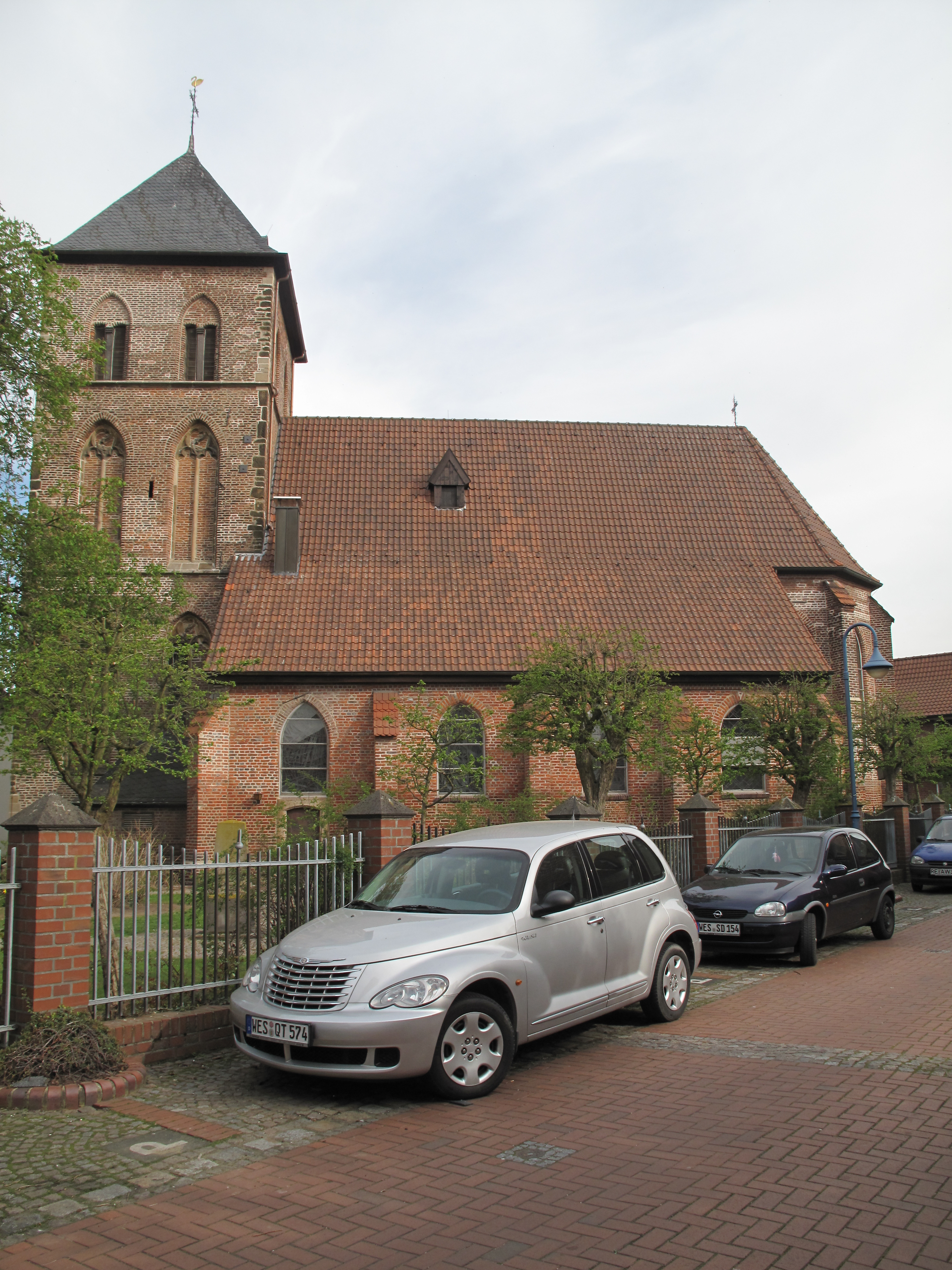
Schermbeck, church: Sankt Georg Kirche

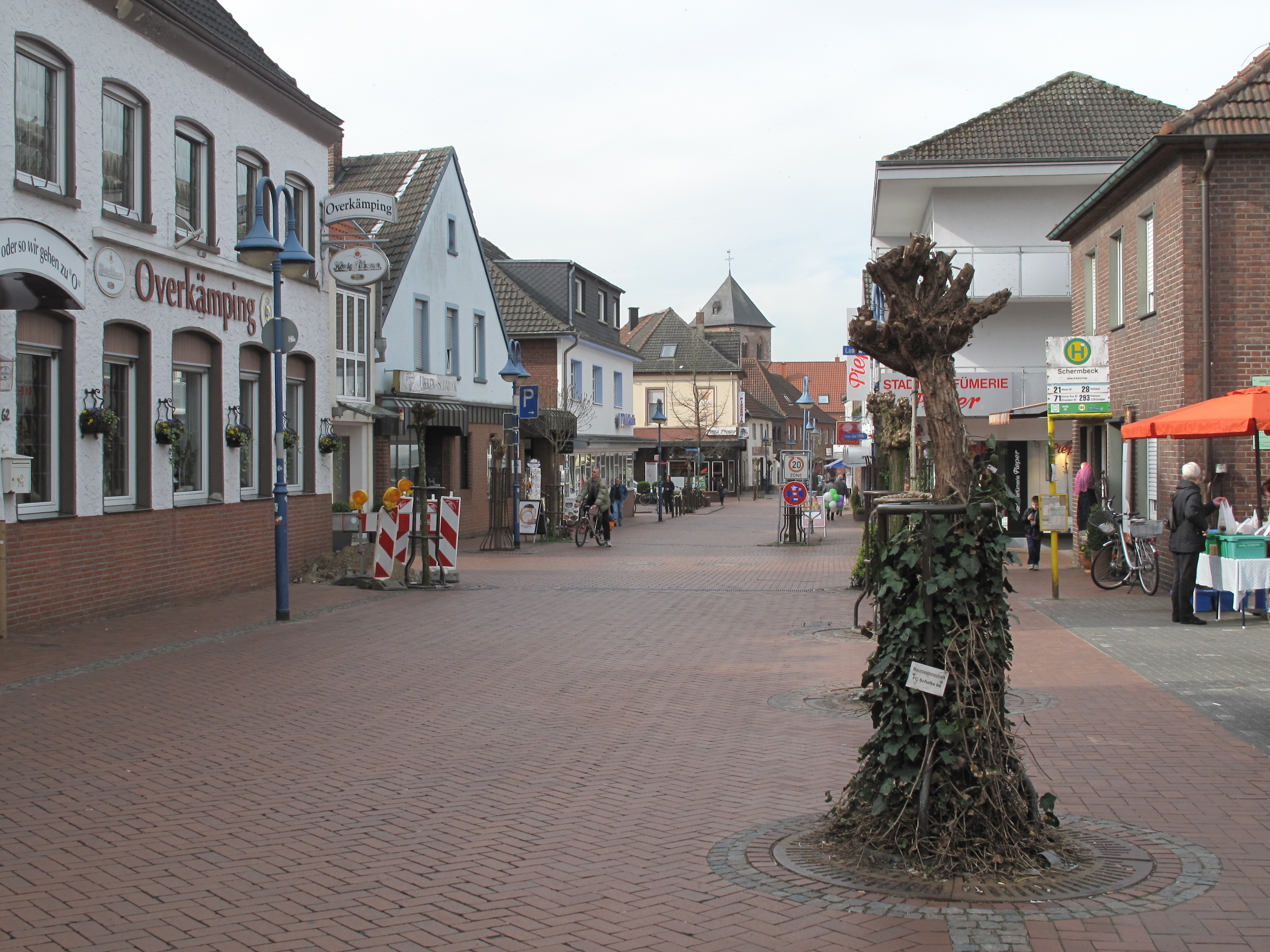
Schermbeck, view to a street

== General information ==
Schermbeck has 3 schools. Locally it is famous for its traditional annual "Volksfest" Kilian, at which many people from the surrounding areas attend. Recently it is becoming a popular location for various events like cooking and art exhibitions.

=== Division of the municipality ===
Schermbeck is divided into 8 districts:

- Altschermbeck
- Bricht
- Damm
- Dämmerwald
- Gahlen
- Overbeck
- Schermbeck
- Weselerwald

== Transport ==
=== Roads ===
Schermbeck is connected to the highways A 3 and A 31 and also to the federal road B 58.

Through Schermbeck run 3,10 km highway, 17,40 km federal roads, 22,10 km ordinary highways, 165,20 km rural roads and 2,30 km are in privat property.

== Religion ==
Out of ancient background Schermbeck is almost half catholic and half evangelic. The proportion of Catholics is about 45,3%, and 39,2% confess themselves as Protestants. There are only a few followers of other religions or denominations.
