= Dinslaken =

- Town
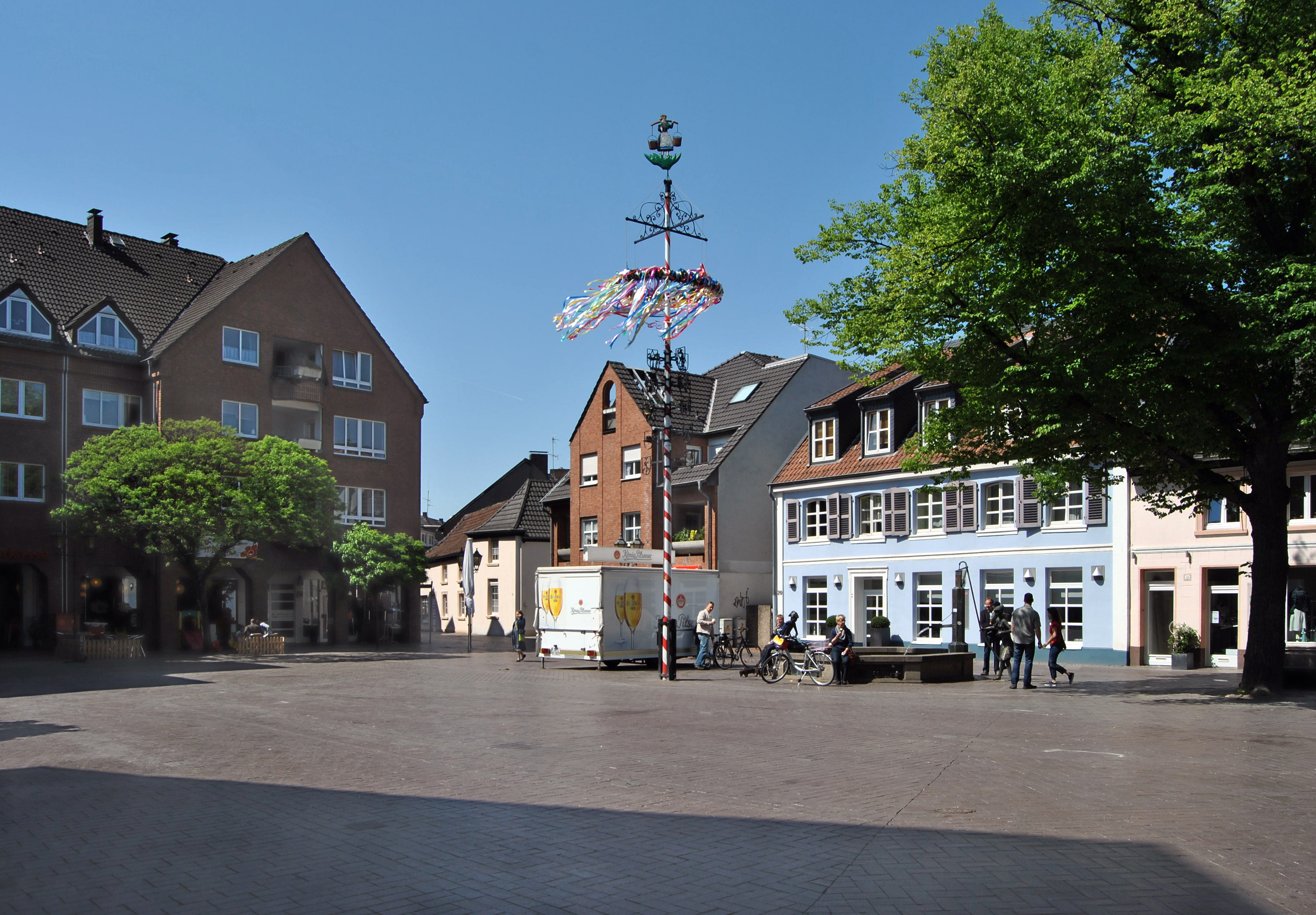
- Dinslaken old marketplace

- Flag Coat of arms

- Location of Dinslaken within Wesel district
- Interactive map of Dinslaken
- Location within Germany Location within North Rhine-Westphalia
- Coordinates: 51°34′N 6°44′E
- Country: Germany
- State: North Rhine-Westphalia
- Admin. region: Düsseldorf
- District: Wesel
- Subdivisions: 7

Government
  - Mayor (2020–25): Michaela Eislöffel

Area
  - Total: 47.66 km^{2} (18.40 sq mi)
- Elevation: 20–113 m (66–371 ft)

Population (2025-12-31)
  - Total: 66,869
  - Density: 1,403/km^{2} (3,634/sq mi)
- Time zone: UTC+01:00 (CET)
  - Summer (DST): UTC+02:00 (CEST)
- Postal codes: 46535, 46537, 46539
- Dialling codes: 02064
- Vehicle registration: WES, DIN, MO
- Website: www.dinslaken.de

Dinslaken (German pronunciation: [ˈdɪnsˌlaːkn̩]) is a town in the district of Wesel, in North Rhine-Westphalia, Germany. It is known for its harness racing track, its now closed coal mine in Lohberg and its wealthy neighborhoods Hiesfeld and Eppinghoven.

== Geography ==
Dinslaken is a city of the Lower Rhine region and situated at the northwestern margin of the Ruhr area, approx. 15 kilometres (9 miles) north of Duisburg.

=== Neighbouring municipalities ===
- Hünxe
- Bottrop
- Oberhausen
- Duisburg
- Rheinberg
- Voerde

=== Division of the town ===
Dinslaken consists of 7 subdivisions

- Eppinghoven
- Hiesfeld
- Innenstadt
- Lohberg
- Oberlohberg
- Bruch
- Averbruch
- Hagenbezirk

== Population ==
Historical population

Year	Pop.	±% p.a.
1965	52,205	—
1970	56,302	+1.52%
1975	56,965	+0.23%
1980	59,466	+0.86%
1985	61,022	+0.52%
1990	65,313	+1.37%
1995	69,148	+1.15%

Year	Pop.	±% p.a.
2000	70,714	+0.45%
2005	70,189	−0.15%
2010	69,472	−0.21%
2015	67,452	−0.59%
2020	67,338	−0.03%
2025	66,869	−0.14%

Source: Landesdatabank Nordrhein-Westfalen

== Sights ==
The medieval parish church, St. Vincentius, was heavily damaged during World War II, but was rebuilt from 1951 to 1952.

== Politics ==
The current mayor of Dinslaken is independent politician Michaela Eislöffel since 2020. The most recent mayoral election was held on 13 September 2020, with a runoff held on 27 September, and the results were as follows:

Candidate	Party	First round		Second round	
Candidate	Party	Votes	%	Votes	%
Michael Heidinger	Social Democratic Party	10,923	41.4	8,846	44.9
Michaela Eislöffel	Independent (CDU/Green)	9,818	37.2	10,856	55.1
Thomas Giezek	Independent Citizens' Representative	4,041	15.3		
Gerd Baßfeld	The Left	1,595	6.1		
Valid votes		26,377	98.1	19,702	99.1
Invalid votes		517	1.9	171	0.9
Total		26,894	100.0	19,873	100.0
Electorate/voter turnout		54,245	49.6	54,234	36.6
Source: City of Dinslaken (1st round, 2nd round)

=== City council ===
Results of the 2020 city council election.

The Dinslaken city council governs the city alongside the Mayor. The most recent city council election was held on 13 September 2020, and the results were as follows:

Party	Votes	%	+/-	Seats	+/-
Social Democratic Party (SPD)	7,633	29.0	▼14.7	18	▼2
Christian Democratic Union (CDU)	6,050	23.0	▼6.7	14	▲1
Alliance 90/The Greens (Grüne)	5,058	19.2	▲10.5	12	▲8
Independent Citizens' Representative (UBV)	3,202	12.2	▲6.4	7	▲4
The Left (Die Linke)	1,523	5.8	▼0.4	4	▲1
Die PARTEI	1,184	4.5	New	3	New
Free Democratic Party (FDP)	1,101	4.2	▲1.9	3	▲2
Active Voters' Association of Dinslaken (AWG)	605	2.3	▼0.1	1	±0
Valid votes	26,356	97.9			
Invalid votes	563	2.1			
Total	26,919	100.0		62	▲16
Electorate/voter turnout	54,245	49.6	▼0.3		
Source: City of Dinslaken

== Twin towns – sister cities ==
Dinslaken is twinned with:

- Agen, France
- Arad, Israel

== Notable people ==
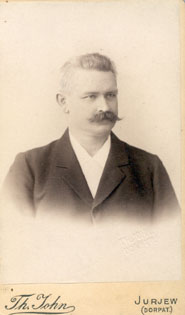
Dietrich Barfurth, 1890s

- Dietrich Barfurth (1849–1927), physician and anatomist, rector of the University of Rostock
- Maria Sander-Domagala (1924–1999), athlete (sprinter) and Olympic medalist
- Alfred Grimm (1943–2026), artist
- Frank Saborowski (born 1958), footballer
- Wolfgang de Beer (1964–2024), football player and coach
- Katrin Himmler (born 1967), political scientist, author of the book The Himmler Brothers: A German Family History
- Ralf Kelleners (born 1968), racing driver
- Michael Wendler (born 1972), composer and songwriter
- Paula Kalenberg (born 1986), actress
- Timm Golley (born 1991), footballer
- Linda Dallmann (born 1994), footballer
