= Inner German relations =

- West Germany: East Germany

Inner German relations (German: Innerdeutsche Beziehungen), also known as the FRG–GDR relations, East Germany–West Germany relations or German–German relations (German: deutsch-deutsche Beziehungen), were the political, diplomatic, economic, cultural, and personal contacts between the Federal Republic of Germany (West Germany or FRG) and the German Democratic Republic (East Germany or GDR) during the period of the West–East division in German history from the founding of East Germany on 7 October 1949 to Germany's reunification on 3 October 1990.

== History ==
=== Postwar period ===
Germany 1947: Four occupation zones, the whole of Berlin, the Saarland and the German eastern territories under foreign administration.

After the unconditional surrender of the Wehrmacht in May 1945, the anti-Hitler coalition between the United States and the Soviet Union broke up, and the idea of dividing the defeated country was from then on determined by the emerging East-West conflict (Cold War), which made the inner-German division part of the Iron Curtain dividing the world.

Important milestones of the gradual demarcation were the US-led Marshall Plan in 1947 as well as the Western currency reform and the Berlin blockade in 1948. The integration of the western occupation zones into the community of the Western powers and that of the eastern part into the system of the USSR finally accompanied the founding of the Federal Republic of Germany and that of the GDR in 1949.

=== Intensification of the Cold War ===
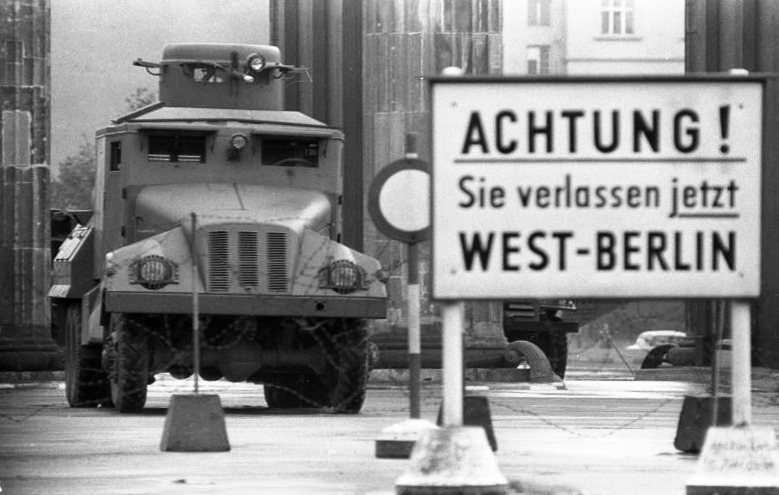
August 1961: Water cannon protects the construction of the Berlin Wall.

The outbreak of the Korean War in 1950 led to an intensive debate in West Germany about German rearmament as a contribution to the defense of Western Europe within the framework of a European Defense Community (EDC). In 1955, the discussion culminated in Germany's accession to the Western military alliance NATO and the establishment of a defensive military, the Bundeswehr.

Economically, the young Federal Republic was bound to the Western powers on the basis of the 1957 Treaty of Rome, which led to membership in the European Economic Community (EEC) and the European Coal and Steel Community (ECSC), the predecessors of today's European Union (EU). Meanwhile, the GDR was incorporated into the Eastern Bloc: The GDR joined the Council for Mutual Economic Assistance (Comecon) and, with its newly formed National People's Army, the Warsaw Pact.

While Chancellor Konrad Adenauer succeeded in gradually bringing the Federal Republic of Germany closer to the West, reconciling the country with its European neighbors and finding a close partner in France, the citizens of the Federal Republic benefited from the Wirtschaftswunder, the upswing brought about by the market economy and integration in the Western European economy. The GDR government, on the other hand, relied on five-year plans and was slow to stabilize the economic situation. Due to the lack of free elections, the ruling Socialist Unity Party of Germany (SED) also lacked legitimacy, which led, among other things, to the popular uprising on June 17, 1953, which was ended with Soviet military help.

On August 13, 1961, the communist regime de facto separated Berlin into East and West Berlin by building the Berlin Wall. In this way, the GDR put a temporary end to the increasing exodus of its highly educated population and to any lingering hopes of reunification in the near future. The GDR was stabilized in this way. The people who remained in the GDR no longer had the option of going to the West via West Berlin and had to come to terms with the regime.

=== West German policy of détente ===
The Cuban Missile Crisis of 1962, when the world was on the brink of nuclear war, marked the turning point of the Cold War, towards a policy of cooperation and détente, which also affected inner German relations through a changed political climate.

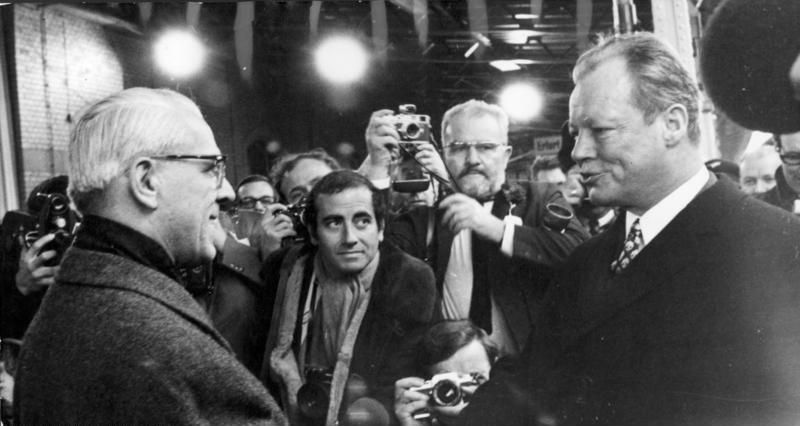
Chairman of the Council of Ministers Willi Stoph (left) and Chancellor Willy Brandt in Erfurt in 1970, the first meeting of the heads of government of the two German states

Nevertheless, the last time there was an all-German team was at the 1964 Summer Olympics in Tokyo. At the same time, the GDR began to release political prisoners from its prisons.

The new Ostpolitik of the social-liberal government under Chancellor Willy Brandt played a decisive role in political rapprochement. Even in the period before the grand coalition that ended the Adenauer era in 1966, Brandt, together with his press spokesman Egon Bahr, had prepared these foreign policy guiding principles of the "policy of small steps," "change through rapprochement" and "human facilitation." Within just three years, after the symbolic prelude with the Erfurt summit in 1970, the Eastern treaties with Moscow, Warsaw and Prague, the four-power agreement on Berlin, the declaration of renunciation of force vis-à-vis the Eastern European states and the Basic Treaty with the GDR were concluded. For the first time, these treaties recognized that the sovereignty of each of the two states was limited to its national territory. Moreover, the independence and autonomy of each of the two states in its internal and external affairs were respected. Strategies such as the Hallstein Doctrine, which the GDR had responded to with the Ulbricht Doctrine, were overcome with Article 4 of the Basic Treaty, in which both sides assumed "that neither state can represent the other internationally or act on its behalf." Nevertheless, the Federal Republic of Germany and the GDR did not recognize each other as independent states in the sense of international law. Therefore, no ambassadors were sent, but permanent representatives based with the respective governments in Bonn and East Berlin were exchanged, to whom the Vienna Convention on Diplomatic Relations applied accordingly. On March 14, 1974, the Protocol on the Establishment was signed in Bonn. The Federal Chancellery, rather than the Foreign Office, was responsible for the Permanent Mission of the GDR in Bonn, while the Ministry of Foreign Affairs of the GDR was responsible for matters concerning the Permanent Mission of the Federal Republic of Germany in East Berlin.

On May 7, 1974, Willy Brandt resigned after the Guillaume affair.

The policy of normalization nevertheless served to defuse the international East-West conflict and set the stage for the 1975 Conference on Security and Cooperation in Europe (CSCE) and the talks on troop limitations. However, the "regulated coexistence" achieved cemented the status quo to such an extent that after more than 20 years in both German states, few still believed in the feasibility of reunification.

In the GDR, people reacted to the new developments in détente with a new demarcation in order to find their own state identity. With its willingness to engage in dialogue, the state had gained international recognition. In 1973, the Federal Republic and the GDR became members of the UN. Increasing economic performance also raised the nation's self-confidence, which led the Volkskammer in 1974 to delete the terms German nation and reunification from the constitution of the German Democratic Republic. The fact that too much independence could also lead to conflict with the Soviet Union had already been felt in 1971 by Walter Ulbricht, who had been replaced in his position as first secretary of the SED by Erich Honecker because of his refusal to reform.

=== 1970 to 1988 ===
Meanwhile, the two oil crises in the 1970s had a devastating effect on the GDR's economic development and led to discontent among the population, but not to structural reforms. Emerging opposition groups were repressed by the state security's tightly meshed network of informers in order to maintain political stability in the country.

A disruption of Inner German relations followed the Spiegel publication of the manifesto of the League of Democratic Communists of Germany (an alleged opposition group within the East German state party SED) in January 1978.

In the meantime, Inner German relations were strained by a new wave of international rearmament, culminating in the NATO Double-Track Decision and the Soviet occupation of Afghanistan in 1979. Domestically, the government under Chancellor Helmut Schmidt was no longer able to cope with these pressures and eventually paved the way for a CDU/CSU-FDP coalition under Chancellor Helmut Kohl. This coalition tried to maintain contact with the neighboring German state, which had been strengthened by Schmidt's visit to the GDR in 1981. It was also only possible to save the GDR from financial ruin solely through billions in loans from West Germany. The SED's refusal to apply to the GDR the reforms introduced by Soviet state and party leader Mikhail Gorbachev isolated the SED dictatorship to some extent even within the communist camp.

In 1986, Eisenhüttenstadt and Saarlouis established the first German-German town twinning.

Erich Honecker's visit to the Federal Republic of Germany in 1987, which had been planned for years, was seen by both states as an important step in the development of German-German relations. The GDR leadership saw the event as the culmination of (de facto) recognition.

=== 1989–90 ===
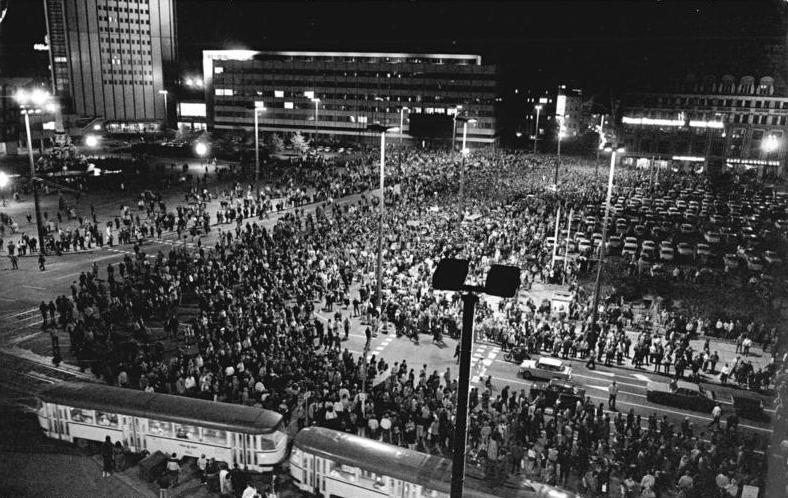
Monday demonstration in Leipzig on October 16, 1989

Gorbachev's reform policy of Perestroika and Glasnost, along with the noticeable defusing of the international East-West conflict through binding disarmament agreements between the USSR and the USA, ultimately led to the revolutions in 1989 in the individual states of the Eastern Bloc as well.

Under Gorbachev's Sinatra Doctrine, Moscow no longer stood in the way of gradual democratization. Thus, Hungary was able to open its border with Austria in August 1989. With the onset of mass exodus, opposition movements within the GDR also gained new momentum, resulting in nationwide Monday demonstrations. On November 9, 1989, Günter Schabowski, a member of the Politburo of the SED, declared at a press conference that East German citizens were free to travel, whereupon all inner-German border crossings were opened. The fall of the Berlin Wall represented a high point in the course of the peaceful revolution.

The "window of history" that was now open for reunification moved all parties to act quickly: The SED offered the opposition roundtable talks, and Helmut Kohl single-handedly presented his ten-point program for overcoming the division of Germany. On May 18, 1990, the East German government under Lothar de Maizière, which had emerged from the People's Chamber elections on March 18, 1990, concluded the Treaty on the Creation of a Monetary, Economic and Social Union.

Taking into account the agreements and decisions of the victorious powers from the wartime and postwar periods, the Two-plus-Four Treaty of September 12, 1990, made final arrangements with regard to Germany. Accordingly, the united Germany comprises the territories of the Federal Republic of Germany, the German Democratic Republic and the whole of Berlin. It does not make any territorial claims over and above these against other states. Since then, the German question has been regarded as settled in political terms and under international law.

On August 23, 1990, the People's Chamber decided on the East German's accession to the Federal Republic of Germany in accordance with Article 23 of the Basic Law. On September 20, 1990, the German Bundestag and the Volkskammer (People's Chamber) approved the Unification Treaty with the required two-thirds majority. Effective October 3, 1990, the states of Brandenburg, Mecklenburg-Western Pomerania, Saxony, Saxony-Anhalt and Thuringia became states of the Federal Republic of Germany. Since then, this day has been a public holiday in place of June 17 as German Unity Day.

On the night of October 2 to 3, 1990, the German federal flag was hoisted at the Reichstag building in Berlin.

The Federal Ministry for Internal German Relations was dissolved on January 1, 1991.

By organizational decree of the Federal Chancellor of October 27, 1998, a Federal Government Commissioner for the New States of Germany was appointed.

Even 30 years after the establishment of German unity, there are significant differences in the living conditions of the western and eastern states of Germany.

== Treaties between West Germany and East Germany ==
Germany policy since the Grand Coalition of 1966 consisted primarily of seeking negotiations and treaties with the GDR. Since 1969, numerous treaties, agreements and arrangements have been concluded by SPD-led federal governments. Article 7 of the Basic Treaty provided for agreements in the fields of economics, science and technology, transportation, legal relations, postal and telecommunications services, health care, culture, sports, environmental protection and other areas.

These included:

- Postal Agreement between the Federal Republic of Germany and the GDR of September 30, 1971.
- Transit agreement of December 17, 1971
- Agreement between the Government of the German Democratic Republic and the Senate of West Berlin on Facilitating and Improving Travel and Visiting Traffic of December 20, 1971
- Treaty between the Federal Republic of Germany and the German Democratic Republic on Transport Issues of May 26, 1972 (Local Border Traffic)
- Basic Treaty of December 21, 1972
- German-German Cultural Agreement of May 6, 1986
- Treaty on Monetary, Economic and Social Union of May 18, 1990
- Unification Treaty of August 31, 1990

== Trade relations ==
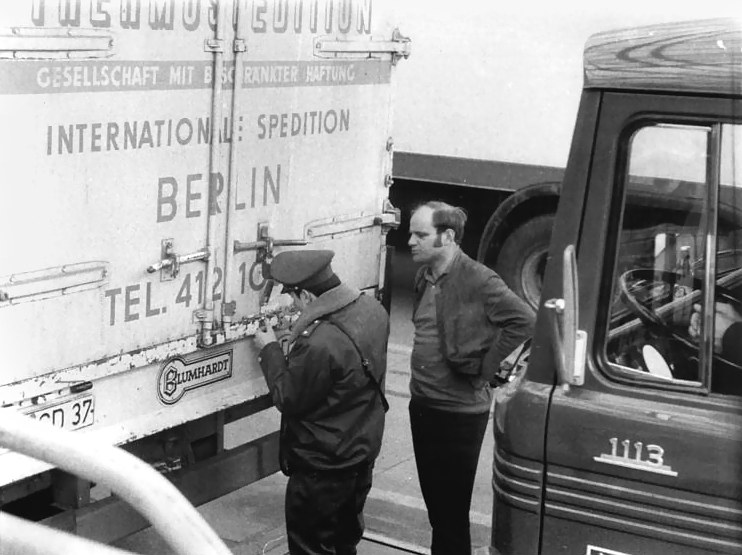
A truck is sealed at the inner German border.

Interzone trade, which had already begun in 1946, was placed on a new footing after the currency reforms and the two state foundations on September 20, 1951, with the Agreement on Trade between the Currency Areas of the German Mark (German Mark, DM) and the Currency Areas of the German Mark of the German Central Bank (East German mark, DDM). With an amendment to the agreement on August 16, 1960, the GDR was granted an interest-free overdraft facility (swing). This was also intended to serve the Federal Republic as a "political instrument to secure free access to Berlin". Since the two German states did not want to recognize each other as independent states in the sense of international law, domestic German economic relations were not governed by the foreign trade law otherwise applicable to foreign trade, but by the foreign exchange control laws of the occupying powers. Thus, from the perspective of the Federal Republic, inner German trade was neither foreign trade nor conventional domestic trade, but "trade sui generis." The Statistical Yearbook of the Federal Republic of Germany also did not list interzone trade, and later inner German trade, under the heading "foreign trade," but classified it under "trade, hotels and restaurants, travel." The GDR, on the other hand, regarded intra-German trade as foreign trade at an early stage and kept statistics on it accordingly. The Ministry for Intra-German Trade, Foreign Trade and Material Supply was responsible for this.

The exchange of goods was regulated on the basis of lists of goods. These required approval and were subject to quotas in terms of quantity and value (initially to a considerable extent). Payment transactions were not carried out by direct payments between the companies involved, but were settled by clearing via various sub-accounts at the central banks of the Federal Republic and the GDR. The unit of payment agreed upon was the so-called clearing unit (VE).

The two economies, both poor in raw materials, exchanged mainly basic materials and production goods, with a share of over 50%. While the Federal Republic supplied the GDR mainly with chemical products and high-grade raw materials (coal, coke) as well as protein animal feed (5.1%) and crude oils (2.5%), it also purchased refined products such as motor gasoline, heating oil and plastics as well as cattle for slaughter (3.4%), cereals (2.1%) and confectionery (1.5%). Exports of machinery and equipment to the West were limited because products manufactured in the GDR were not competitive enough in the Western capital goods market.

In the 1970s, the share of intra-German trade in total foreign trade turnover averaged 5.1% in the Federal Republic, but was almost twice as high in the GDR at 9.4%. The benefits that the GDR derived from intra-German trade in the form of interest and customs duty savings and VAT reductions were estimated at around DM 750 million for the 1980s.

The guarantee of DM 1 billion granted to the Foreign Trade Bank of the GDR by the Federal Government to a consortium of West German banks on June 29, 1983, was not only for economic reasons, but was also seen politically by the Federal Government "as an important contribution to improving relations with the GDR".

Section 12 of the Treaty on Monetary, Economic and Social Union of May 18, 1990 adapted the Berlin Agreement of September 20, 1951 with regard to monetary and economic union. The clearing system regulated there was terminated and the closing balance of the swing was settled. Existing obligations were settled in German marks. The complete abolition of goods controls at the inner-German border was a consequence of the Unification Treaty.

== Travel ==
The demarcation lines between the four occupation zones were established by the victorious powers on the basis of the zone protocols after the end of World War II. The western border of the Soviet occupation zone became the inner German border between West Germany and the GDR when the states were founded in 1949.

The interzone passport, which had still been introduced by the Allies, was replaced in 1953 by the so-called personal certificate for travel from the GDR to West Germany. To enter the GDR from West Germany, an official identity card and a residence permit issued by the council of the district of the place to be visited were required; when entering East Berlin, a special permit was required from 1960. For travel between West Germany and West Berlin, an identity card was sufficient.

In June 1968, passport and visa requirements were introduced.

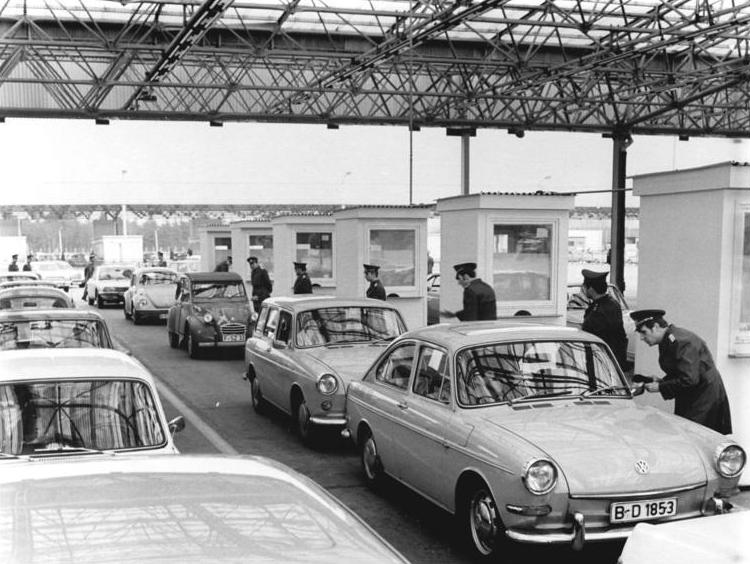
Drewitz-Dreilinden checkpoint (1972)

On August 12, 1961, following a corresponding resolution of the People's Chamber the previous day, the Council of Ministers of the GDR decided to introduce a control "at the borders of the German Democratic Republic, including the border with the western sectors of Greater Berlin," "as is customary at the borders of any sovereign state." GDR citizens were now only allowed to cross these borders with special permission. A special certificate was required to cross the borders from East to West Berlin. Visits "by peaceful citizens of West Berlin to the capital of the German Democratic Republic" were possible upon presentation of the West Berlin identity card. The previous control regulations remained in force for visits to East Berlin by citizens of the West German Federal Republic, for travel abroad by citizens of West Berlin via the GDR's connecting routes, and for transit traffic between West Berlin and West Germany through the GDR.

The decision went into effect on August 13, 1961, and led not only to the construction of the Berlin Wall, but also to a significant tightening of German-German travel regulations overall.

Existing permits for travel by GDR citizens to "capitalist foreign countries" were declared invalid and confiscated. Only in cases where there was "a justified state, social or cultural interest" could a renewed application be made to the Ministry of the Interior (Headquarters of the German People's Police). Persons up to the age of 25 were prohibited from leaving the country. While around 2.5 million travel permits to the Federal Republic had been issued annually before the Wall was built, only 623 permits to travel to West Germany and 645 passes to enter West Berlin had been issued since then until 1965. Travel was to be prevented "where there is no absolute necessity or where there is reasonable suspicion that it is intended to be exploited to leave the German Democratic Republic illegally."

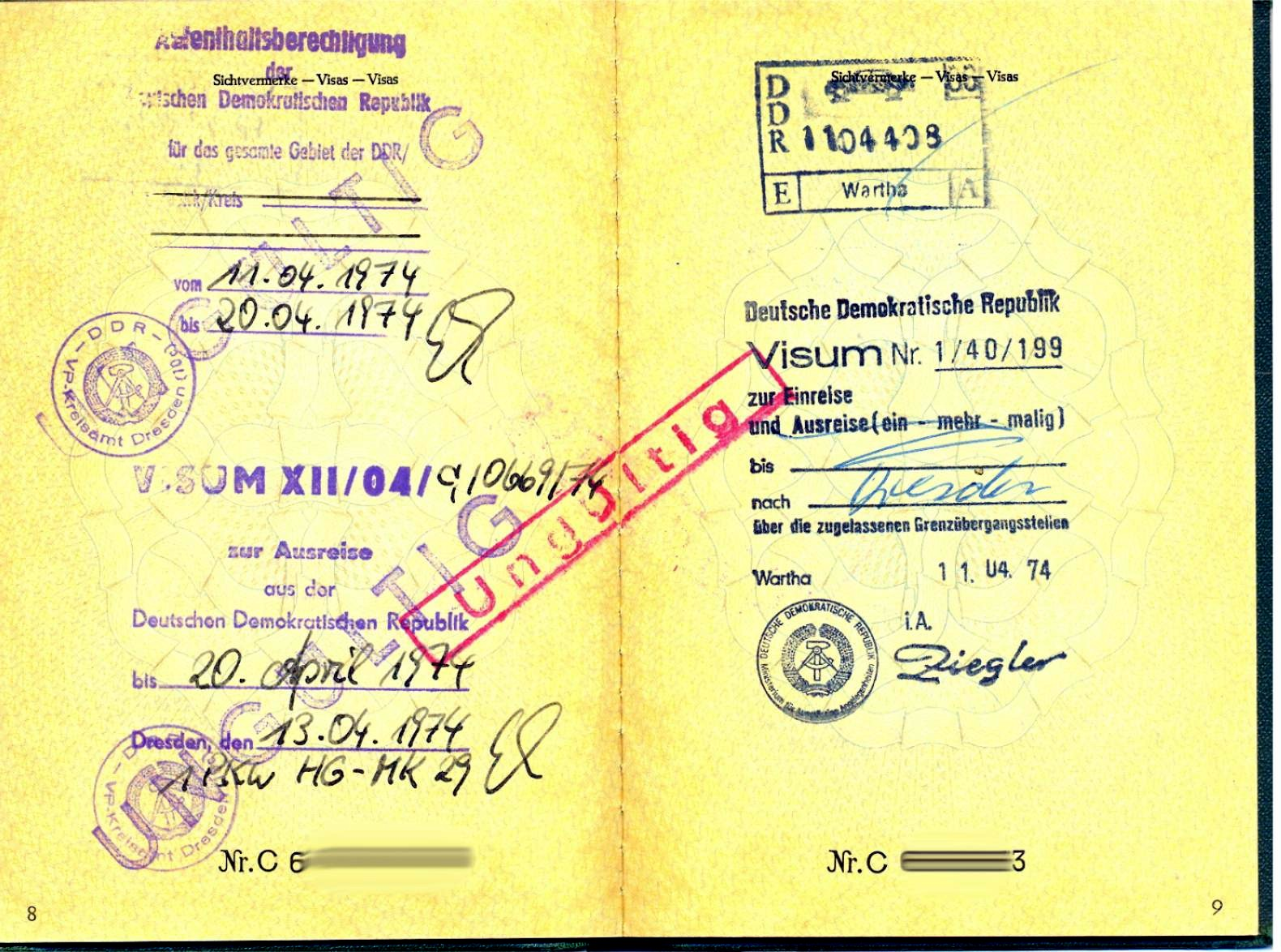
GDR visa, 1974

In 1964, travel conditions were eased for persons receiving old-age, accident, or disability pensions, and later for so-called travel cadres.

By order of November 25, 1964, a mandatory minimum exchange of foreign currencies had been introduced for private visitors from West Germany. The amount per day of duration was fixed from an equivalent of initially 5 to finally 25 GDR marks at the conversion ratios applicable in the GDR.

The border could only be crossed with valid documents at the existing control crossing points. Violations were punishable by imprisonment under Section 8 of the 1954 Passport Act, and under Section 213 of the Criminal Code as of July 1, 1968, as unlawful border crossing.

From 1972, the Agreement on Facilitation and Improvement of Travel and Visits initially allowed persons permanently residing in West Berlin to enter East Berlin and the GDR for humanitarian, family, religious, cultural and tourist reasons. The Transport Treaty of May 26, 1972, then regulated traffic into and through the respective territories on roads, railways, and waterways "in accordance with customary international practice on the basis of reciprocity and nondiscrimination." On May 30, 1972, the Politburo of the SED presented "Principles for the Processing of Applications for Departures of Citizens of the GDR to Non-Socialist States [...] and Entries of Citizens of the FRG into the GDR," concretized by an order of the Minister of the Interior of October 17, 1972. Travel on the occasion of births, marriages, life-threatening illnesses, and deaths of grandparents, parents, children, and siblings could be approved thereafter once or several times up to a total duration of 30 days per year. Travel permits were virtually not granted to persons who could not state urgent family matters or who were of retirement age. It "can therefore be said that the period 1961-1975 was one of extensive travel prohibition throughout."

In many cases, personal meetings took place at transit highway rest stops, even though travelers there had to reckon with surveillance by the Ministry for State Security. As a result of the travel facilitations for West Germans that came with the Transit agreement and the Basic Treaty (including residence in the entire GDR, free choice of border crossing, visits also to acquaintances and not only to relatives, trips several times a year, tourist trips, permission for car traffic, opening of new road crossings, traffic close to the border), travel with the GDR then "increased by leaps and bounds in the further course of the 1970s."“

After government representative Günter Schabowski declared at a press conference on October 9, 1989, that it should be possible to apply for private travel abroad without having to meet certain requirements (reasons for travel and family relationships), the border crossings throughout Germany were literally overrun with people wanting to travel. Since then, de facto border controls no longer took place.

The decree of 21 December 1989 abolished the visa requirement for citizens of the Federal Republic of Germany entering the GDR, and the decree of 16 May 1990 also abolished the passport requirement.

Since July 1, 1990, there have been no more controls on the movement of persons across the inner-German borders. Germans and foreigners who met the entry requirements were allowed to cross the inner-German borders at any point.

Many East Germans had tried to leave for West Germany illegally. Some of the people were East German guards and soldiers.

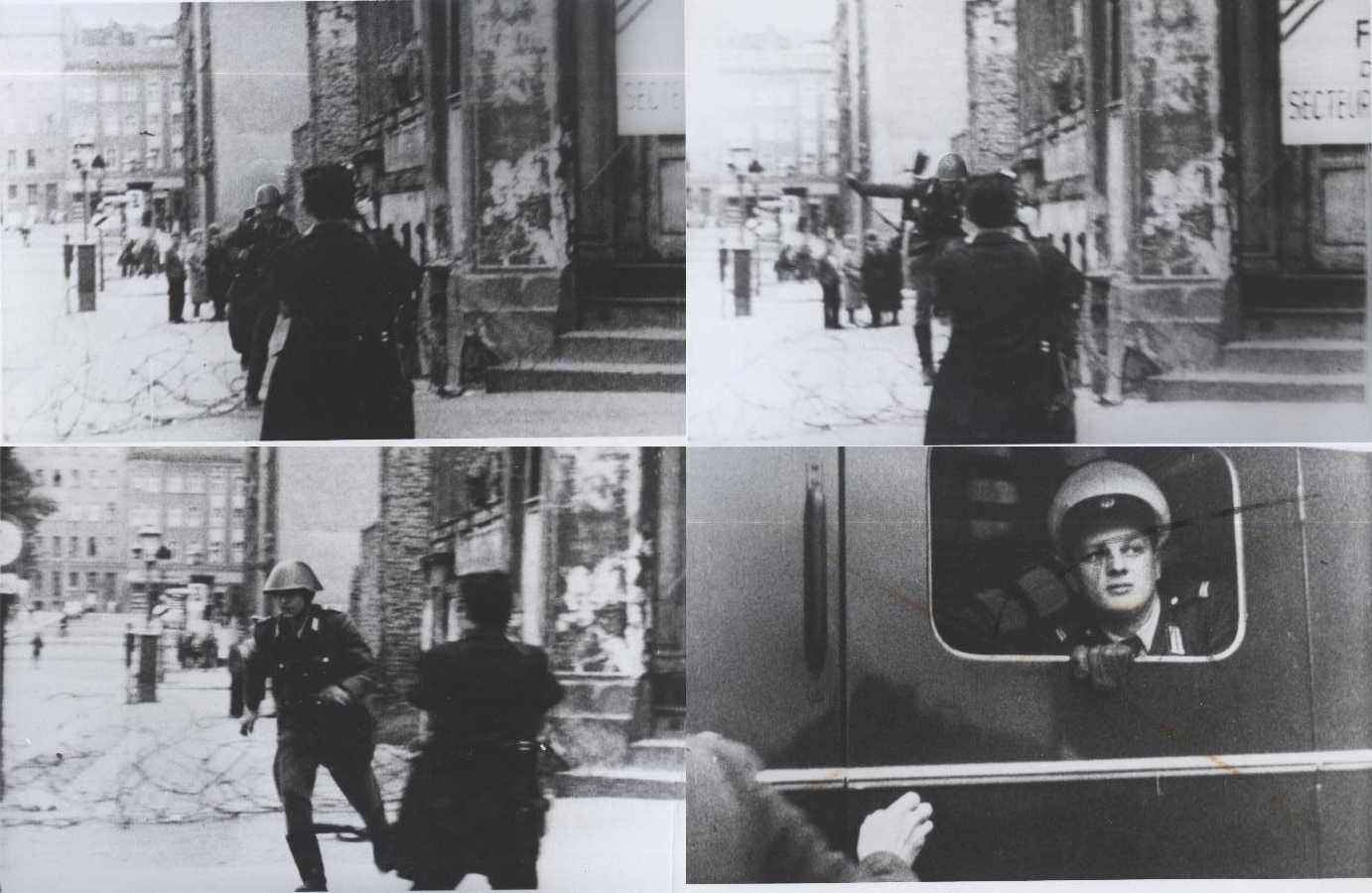
East German policeman Konrad Schumann defecting to West Germany during the construction of the Berlin Wall in 1961

== Culture ==
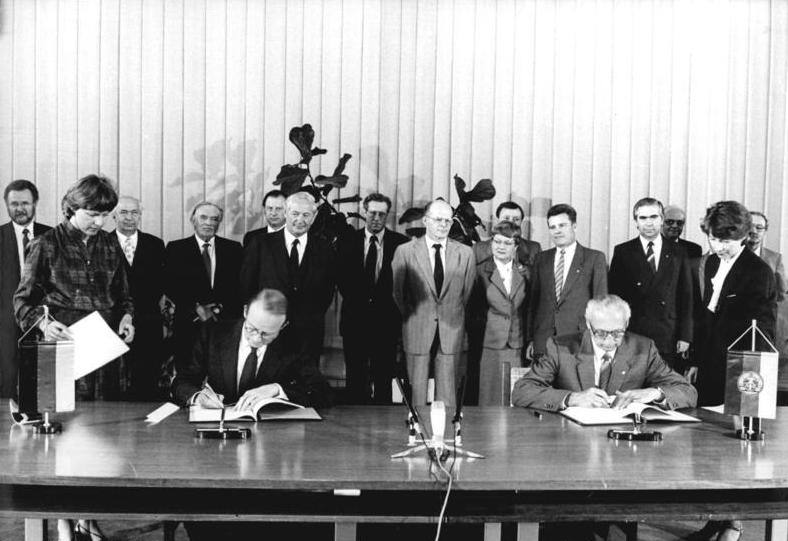
Signing the German-German Cultural Agreement on May 6, 1986

Article 7 of the Basic Treaty provided, among other things, for the conclusion of agreements in the fields of science, culture and sports. After the failure of initial rounds of negotiations in the 1970s, talks resumed in 1983 and led to the conclusion of the Agreement between the Government of the German Democratic Republic and the Government of the Federal Republic of Germany on Cultural Cooperation on May 6, 1986.

The negotiations had been complicated by the understanding of a continuing unified German cultural nation on the one hand, and the thesis of an independent socialist culture on the other, which had developed in the eastern part of Germany after 1945. Nevertheless, the "hour zero" and the confrontation with the cultural rupture caused by National Socialism shaped art and culture throughout postwar Germany. Until the building of the Berlin Wall in 1961, there was a "lively exchange on questions of art, national unity and political concepts" between West and East German artists outside of official cultural policy. On the political level, the question of "cultural assets displaced as a result of the war" was also controversial. It concerned works of art relocated from the Museum Island, which had been located in the eastern part of Berlin since 1945, to the western part of Germany during the Second World War, and which had remained in the west when the Prussian Cultural Heritage Foundation was established in 1957. In addition to the bust of Nefertiti, more than 3,000 other Egyptian objects, 2,000 Greek vases and almost 6,000 paintings were involved.

After the GDR had surprisingly postponed its corresponding ownership claims as a precondition for an agreement, the aforementioned agreement was reached in May 1986 with the express exclusion of these questions in a joint protocol declaration. In November 1986, both sides agreed "that cultural property belonging to public owners in the other part of Germany would be returned to its original location."

Even without an overarching agreement, there had already been concerts by GDR musicians such as Wolf Biermann in the Federal Republic since the mid-1970s; in 1983, Udo Lindenberg had performed at the Palace of the Republic; GDR artists had taken part in Documenta 6 in Kassel in 1977, There were performances by the Berlin Philharmonic under Herbert von Karajan in Dresden, guest appearances by the West Berlin Schaubühne in Chemnitz, retrospectives of Willi Sitte, Wolfgang Mattheuer or Bernhard Heisig in the West and films from both states where shown at film weeks. Authors such as Anna Seghers, Christa Wolf and Christoph Hein were published in the West.

The 1986 agreement was then to be implemented in annual work plans on concrete cultural projects. Thus, in the fall of 1986, the exhibition "Positions - Painting from the Federal Republic of Germany" took place in the Altes Museum in East Berlin. On the very day the border was opened, November 9, 1989, the then Minister President of North Rhine-Westphalia, Johannes Rau, organized the exhibition "Zeitzeichen. Stations of Visual Art in North Rhine-Westphalia" in Leipzig.

Thus, the cultural agreement came too late in history to have any particular impact.

== Literature ==
- Andreas H. Apelt, Robert Grünbaum, Jens Schöne (Hrsg.): 2 x Deutschland. Innerdeutsche Beziehungen 1972–1990. Mitteldeutscher Verlag, Halle (Saale) 2013, ISBN 978-3-89812-961-9.
- Die Geschichte der DDR. In: Informationen zur politischen Bildung Nr. 231. Bundeszentrale für politische Bildung, Bonn 1991.
- Die Teilung Deutschlands. In: Informationen zur politischen Bildung Nr. 232. Bundeszentrale für politische Bildung, Bonn 1991.
- Der Weg zur Einheit. In: Informationen zur politischen Bildung Nr. 250. Bundeszentrale für politische Bildung, Bonn 2005.
- Die Deutsche Geschichte. Band 4: 1945–2000. Weltbild, Augsburg 2001.
- Geschichte. Pocket Teacher. Cornelsen Verlag, Berlin 2000.
- Peter Krewer: Geschäfte mit dem Klassenfeind. Die DDR im innerdeutschen Handel 1949–1989, Kliomedia, Trier 2008, ISBN 978-3-89890-122-2 (Diss. University of Trier, 2007).
- Dirk Kroegel: Einen Anfang finden! Kurt Georg Kiesinger in der Außen- und Deutschlandpolitik der Großen Koalition (Studien zur Zeitgeschichte, Band 52). Oldenbourg, München 1996, ISBN 978-3-486-56163-0 (Full text in German).
- Frank Bösch (Hrsg.): Geteilte Geschichte. Ost- und Westdeutschland 1970–2000. Göttingen 2015, ISBN 978-3-525-30083-1.
