= Berlin S-Bahn boycott =

Boycott of Berlin's S-Bahn by West Berlin authorities and residents

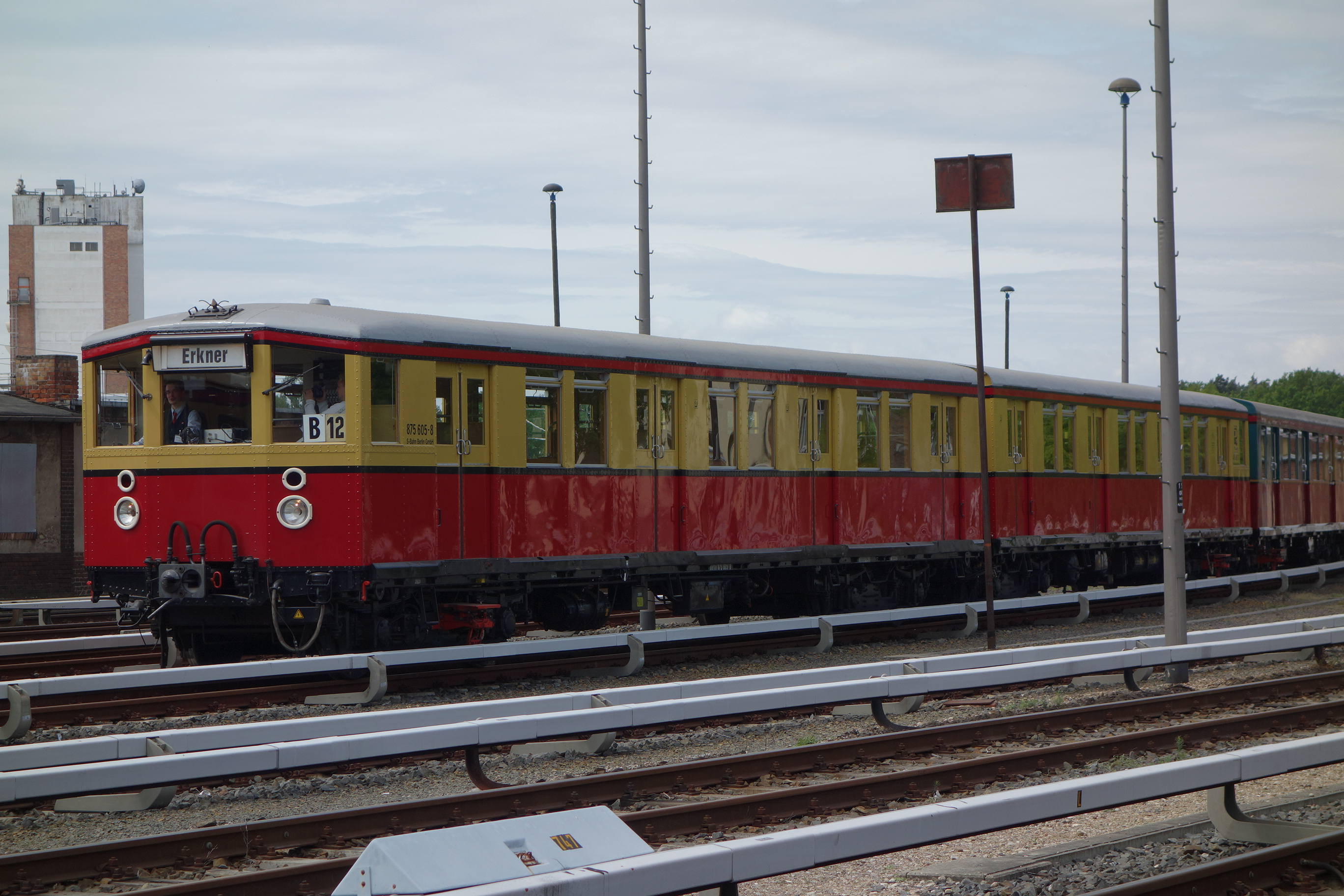
- Berlin S-Bahn train
- Date: 1961 – 1989
- Location: West Berlin
- Caused by: Erection of the Berlin Wall
- Methods: Peaceful; nonviolent resistance
- Result: Restoration of urban railway services

The Berlin S-Bahn boycott was a boycott by the authorities and residents of West Berlin of the Berlin S-Bahn urban railway system in protest against the erection of the Berlin Wall by the German Democratic Republic on 13 August 1961. Lasting until 1989, the boycott was a form of nonviolent resistance that involved avoiding travel on the S-Bahn and developing alternative transportation methods within the city.

== Post-war Berlin S-Bahn ==
After World War II, the Berlin S-Bahn was a vital transportation provider in the city. Initially operating irregularly, the system was fully restored by 1947. By 1948, it carried 420 million passengers annually, accounting for one-third of all passengers using Berlin's public transport. Despite the increasing division of Berlin into East and West, the S-Bahn operated as a unified system across the city and even expanded during the post-war economic boom. S-Bahn trains served the entire city but did not stop at stations along the sector borders, where passenger checks were conducted. Some "through trains" also operated without stopping in West Berlin sectors. The construction of the Berlin Wall in 1961 disrupted this unified system, creating two separate S-Bahn networks, both managed by the East German Deutsche Reichsbahn.

== Political context ==
Under the Four Power Agreement on Berlin, rail transport in Berlin was operated by the East German Deutsche Reichsbahn, even after the city's division into four sectors.

On 8 September 1951, the West German German Trade Union Confederation called for a boycott of the S-Bahn after the German Democratic Republic introduced transit fees for road travel between West Berlin and West Germany. This call had little impact, as Berliners prioritized freedom of movement across all sectors. However, the situation changed in 1961. After the Berlin Wall was erected, the German Trade Union Confederation again called for a boycott of the S-Bahn in West Berlin, this time with significant success. The boycott included an information campaign at Berlin Zoologischer Garten station under the slogan "Wer S-Bahn fährt, bezahlt Ulbrichts Stacheldraht" ("Whoever rides the S-Bahn pays for Ulbricht's barbed wire"). This slogan was misleading, as public transport was not profitable, and S-Bahn fares did not directly fund border fortifications. The boycott was supported by Willy Brandt, who emphasized the importance of West Berliners showing solidarity with those in East Berlin.

== Economic impact ==
To replace the boycotted S-Bahn lines, the West Berlin Berliner Verkehrsbetriebe, under Senate directives, introduced bus services, importing 178 additional buses from West Germany. Within a week, S-Bahn passenger numbers in West Berlin dropped from approximately 500,000 to 100,000. By the late 1970s, the S-Bahn's share of public transport in West Berlin fell to about 5%, with trains often running empty in the western sectors. Alongside bus services, West Berlin expanded its metro system. The German Democratic Republic's S-Bahn revenue in West Berlin plummeted from 36 million marks to 7 million, exacerbating losses from public transport operations, with the German Democratic Republic subsidizing an additional 7 million marks annually.

The boycott also incurred costs for the Federal Republic of Germany. To maintain competitive pricing, the West Berlin Senate lowered bus, tram, and metro fares to 20 pfennig per ride, compared to the S-Bahn. The Berliner Verkehrsbetriebe also increased employee wages, costing the federal government an additional 23 million marks. In 1964, following a federal government veto, the Senate raised bus, tram, and metro fares by 50%, making some Berliner Verkehrsbetriebe services up to three times more expensive than the S-Bahn. Despite this, the boycott persisted.

The boycott was enforced top-down. References to the S-Bahn were removed from metro stations, transport maps, Berliner Verkehrsbetriebe infrastructure, bus and tram signage, and even tourist guides. S-Bahn tickets were no longer valid for other forms of transport.

== Consequences ==
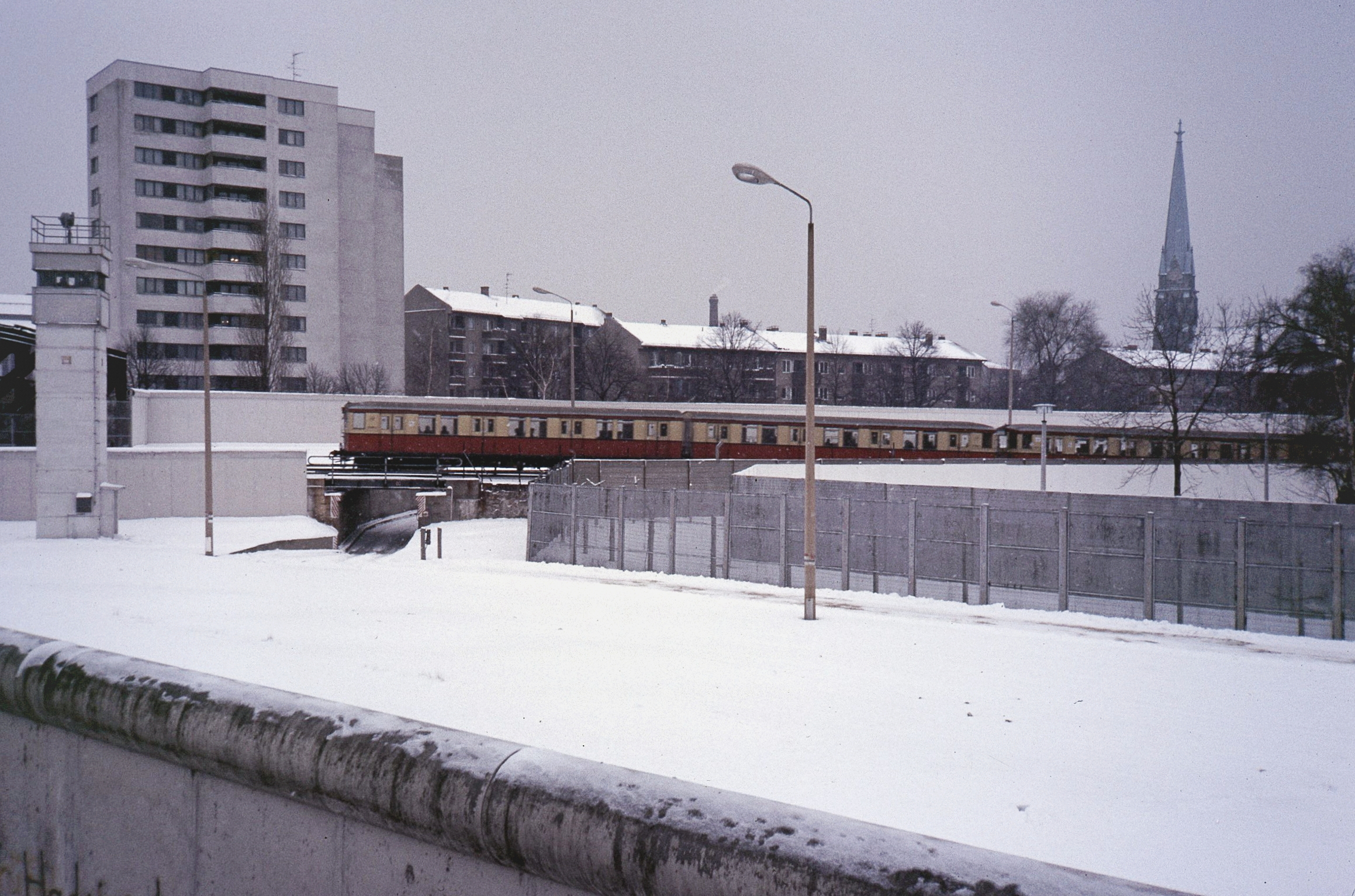
Berlin S-Bahn train crossing the border between Wedding (West Berlin) and Mitte (East Berlin)

The boycott led to significant resource waste. Initially, the Deutsche Reichsbahn shortened train formations to cut costs while keeping S-Bahn fares the lowest in the city. Over time, however, further timetable reductions were necessary. The German Democratic Republic avoided layoffs, citing the socialist nature of the railway, but financial pressures persisted. In the 1970s, Deutsche Reichsbahn repeatedly asked West Berlin authorities to share the costs of maintaining the S-Bahn or take over its operations, highlighting the system's 173 km of tracks and shorter travel times compared to other transport modes. By around 1975, growing transport issues in West Berlin prompted citizen initiatives and passenger groups to advocate for renewed use of the S-Bahn, though these groups were often mocked in the media as communist.

=== Layoffs in transport ===
Due to West Berlin's refusal to cooperate and mounting financial losses, Deutsche Reichsbahn began layoffs in January 1980. These were poorly managed, affecting vulnerable groups such as single mothers, near-retirement employees, and even a pregnant woman. Appeals to labor courts were unsuccessful. The tense atmosphere and lack of trust led to 700 employees leaving voluntarily by September 1980, further worsening the situation by necessitating costly overtime. On 15 September 1980, additional timetable cuts were announced, including suspending services from 9:00 PM to 5:00 AM, which reduced employee wages.

=== Railway workers' strike ===
Poor working conditions, further timetable cuts, and continued disregard by West Berlin residents and authorities led to widespread dissatisfaction among S-Bahn workers, culminating in a strike on 17 September 1980. West Berlin trade unions, which had promoted the boycott since 1961, did not support the strike. The general public, having contributed to the situation through the boycott, expressed limited sympathy, with only a few groups opposing the boycott showing solidarity. The strike halted S-Bahn services in West Berlin and disrupted transit trains from West Germany to West Berlin, including supply, mail, and Allied military trains. The strike ended on 25 September 1980 after harsh crackdowns and forceful interventions, with approximately 200 workers dismissed. Services resumed on 27 September 1980.

The strike accelerated further S-Bahn reductions in West Berlin. Staff shortages prevented a return to pre-strike service levels, and Deutsche Reichsbahn temporarily brought in workers from the German Democratic Republic to operate transit trains. S-Bahn services were withdrawn from parts of Berlin's western ring line, and operations were limited to three lines with 20-minute intervals, reducing the network from 144.8 km to 72.6 km. By 1983, the S-Bahn in West Berlin carried only 8,000–10,000 passengers daily. Deutsche Reichsbahn announced plans to cease S-Bahn operations in West Berlin entirely by 1984.

=== Takeover by West Berlin authorities ===
The strike prompted West Berlin authorities to recognize that the S-Bahn's diminished role could no longer be ignored, particularly for image-related reasons. On 31 October 1983, negotiations with Deutsche Reichsbahn resumed, with approval from Western Allies and partial funding from the Federal Republic of Germany. On 9 January 1984, at 3:00 AM, the Berliner Verkehrsbetriebe took over S-Bahn operations in West Berlin. Exceptions included the border section between Berlin Hauptbahnhof and Berlin Friedrichstraße station, where Berliner Verkehrsbetriebe trains were operated by Deutsche Reichsbahn drivers, and Wollankstraße station, located in the German Democratic Republic but serving West Berlin passengers, with trains operated by the Berliner Verkehrsbetriebe and the station managed by Deutsche Reichsbahn.

After the takeover, S-Bahn services were gradually restored, though by 1989, many lines remained inactive, with plans for reinstatement between 1990 and 2004. By 1989, 50.47 km of track had been restored. Service frequency increased on remaining lines, boosting passenger numbers. Although the Berliner Verkehrsbetriebe took full control of the S-Bahn in West Berlin, the boycott formally continued until 1989.
