= Egon Bahr =

German politician (1922–2015)

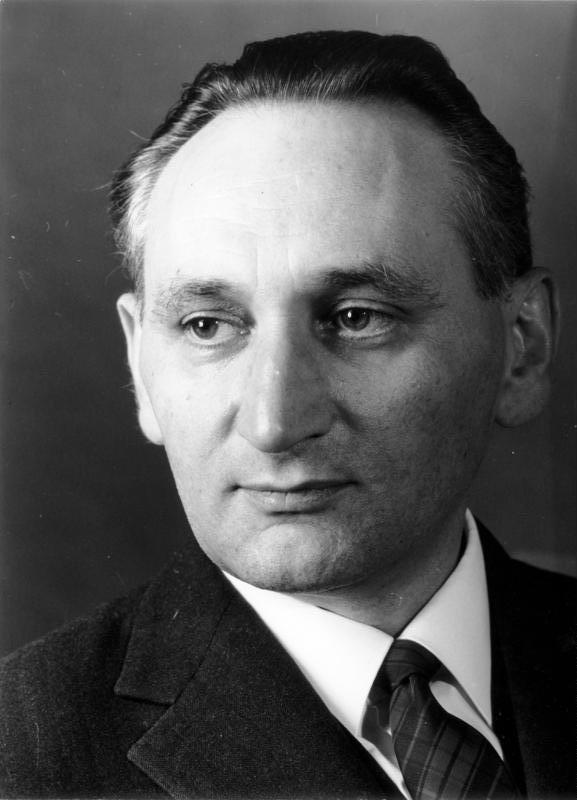
- Bahr in 1969

Federal Manager of the Social Democratic Party
- In office 15 December 1976 – 23 February 1981
- Leader: Willy Brandt
- Preceded by: Holger Börner
- Succeeded by: Peter Glotz

Minister for Economic Cooperation
- In office 8 July 1974 – 14 December 1976
- Chancellor: Helmut Schmidt
- Preceded by: Erhard Eppler
- Succeeded by: Marie Schlei

Minister for Special Affairs
- In office 15 December 1972 – 16 May 1974 Serving with Werner Maihofer
- Chancellor: Willy Brandt
- Preceded by: Horst Ehmke
- Succeeded by: Wolfgang Schäuble (1984)

State Secretary in the Chancellery Plenipotentiary of the Federal Republic of Germany in Berlin
- In office 1969–1972
- Chancellor: Willy Brandt
- Preceded by: Carl Krautwig
- Succeeded by: Dietrich Spangenberg
Bundestag constituencies
Member of the Bundestag for Schleswig-Holstein
In office 29 March 1983 – 20 December 1990
Preceded by	multi-member district
Succeeded by	multi-member district
Constituency	Social Democratic Party List
In office 14 December 1976 – 29 March 1983
Preceded by	Constituency established
Succeeded by	Harm Dallmeyer
Constituency	Flensburg – Schleswig
In office 13 December 1972 – 14 December 1976
Preceded by	multi-member district
Succeeded by	multi-member district
Constituency	Social Democratic Party List

Personal details
- Born: Egon Karl-Heinz Bahr; 18 March 1922 Treffurt, Province of Saxony, Free State of Prussia, Weimar Republic (now Thuringia, Germany)
- Died: 19 August 2015 (aged 93) Berlin, Germany
- Party: Social Democratic Party (1956–2015)
- Spouses: Dorothea Grob (m. 1945; died 2011) Adelheid Bonnemann-Böhner (m. 2011)
- Children: 3
- Occupation: Politician; Journalist; Diplomat; Civil Servant

Military service
- Allegiance: Germany
- Branch/service: Luftwaffe
- Years of service: 1942–1944
- Rank: Fahnenjunker
- Unit: Luftkriegsschule VI
- Battles/wars: World War II

Egon Karl-Heinz Bahr (German pronunciation: [ˈeːɡɔn kaʁlˈhaɪnts ˈbaːɐ̯]; 18 March 1922 – 19 August 2015) was a German SPD politician.

The former journalist was the creator of the Ostpolitik promoted by West German Chancellor Willy Brandt, for whom he served as Secretary of State in the German Chancellery from 1969 until 1972. Between 1972 and 1990 he was an MP in the Bundestag of the Federal Republic of Germany and from 1972 until 1976 was also a Minister of the Federal Government.

Bahr was a key figure in multiple negotiation sessions between not only East and West Germany, but also West Germany and the Soviet Union. In addition to his instrumental role in Ostpolitik, Bahr was also an influential voice in negotiating the Treaty of Moscow, the Treaty of Warsaw, the Transit Agreement of 1971, and the Basic Treaty of 1972.

== Life and career ==
Bahr was born in Treffurt, in the Prussian Province of Saxony, into a family of partial Jewish descent, the son of Hedwig (née Schmitt) and Karl Bahr, a high school teacher. Under the Nazi regime's Nuremberg Laws, his mother was classified as a Halbjüdin because her own mother was Jewish. In 1938, his father was dismissed from the teaching profession after refusing to divorce his wife, and the family moved to Berlin. Bahr was barred from university studies and music training due to his Jewish ancestry. After completing his secondary education in 1940, he trained as an industrial clerk at the Rheinmetall-Borsig armament corporation in Berlin.

During World War II, Bahr served in the Wehrmacht from 1942 until 1944 as a Fahnenjunker (cadet) in the Luftkriegsschule VI in Kitzingen. He was demoted and dismissed from the military after authorities discovered his Jewish maternal grandmother, accusing him of having "sneaked into the Wehrmacht" as a non-Aryan. He was subsequently assigned to forced labor as an armaments worker at Rheinmetall-Borsig.

After the war, Bahr worked as a journalist at the Berliner Zeitung, one of West Berlin's prominent daily newspapers. He later worked at two other West Berliner periodicals, the Allgemeine Zeitung (West Berlin) and Der Tagesspiegel (West Berlin). From 1950 to 1960, he served as chief commentator of the Bonn bureau of RIAS, (“ Rundfunk im amerikanischen Sektor”, or "Broadcasting in the American Sector"). In 1959, he received his posting as press attaché to the West German Embassy in Ghana. From 1984 to 1994, Bahr served as the Director of the Institute for Peace Research and Security Policy at the University of Hamburg, from which he received an honorary professorship in 1984. Bahr was married and had three children. On 19 August 2015 Bahr died at the age of 93.

== Political activity ==
Bahr was a member of the SPD from 1956 until his death in 2015. From 1960 to 1966 Bahr was the head of the Press and Information Office for the Land of Berlin (at that time, West Berlin). In that capacity, Bahr served as the spokesman for the Senate of Berlin, which was led at the time by Mayor Willy Brandt. From 1966 to 1969 Bahr served as an ambassador and as Ministerial Director of the Planning Staff of the German Foreign Office (Auswärtiges Amt). Bahr is considered to have been one of the most important and most influential advisors to Willy Brandt, especially with respect to the latter's policy of Ostpolitik ("Eastern Policy", also known as “‘'Entspannungspolitik'’”, the German equivalent of "détente").

Following the West German federal election of 1969, Bahr became Secretary of State of the German Chancellery as well as Bevollmächtigter ("commissioner" or "appointed representative") of the Federal Cabinet of Germany in Berlin. It was in this capacity that Bahr served as an emissary to and negotiator with Moscow with respect to the 1970 Treaty of Moscow and the 1970 Treaty of Warsaw, as well as the Transit Treaty of 1971 and the Basic Treaty of 1972 that were concluded with the German Democratic Republic. On the basis of his success in guiding these treaties to successful conclusion, Bahr is often referred to as "Architect of the Eastern Treaties". He is also credited with two of the Brandt government's most influential mottos describing West Germany's relationship with the German Democratic Republic, “Wandel durch Annäherung” ("change through rapprochement", a speech at the Evangelische Akademie Tutzing) and “Politik der kleinen Schritte” ("policy of small steps").

With respect to Ostpolitik, Bahr's field of work was mostly behind the curtains to prepare treaties. This secrecy was broken once, however. Bahr was in Moscow holding talks with Andrei Gromyko, and materials from these talks found their way, via an unknown leak, to the tabloid newspaper Bild. On 1 July 1970, they appeared in two issues. This unauthorized publication became known as the "Bahr Paper".

Following Willy Brandt's resignation of the Chancellery, Bahr also relinquished his position in the cabinet. He was, however, reappointed by Brandt's successor, Helmut Schmidt (SPD), to the Ministry for Economic Cooperation and Development. On 14 December 1976, following the federal elections that had taken place two months earlier, Bahr left his position in the Federal Government permanently.

Bahr served from 1972 until 1990 as a member of the German Bundestag. He was directly elected in 1976 and 1980 as the representative of the Schleswig-Flensburg electoral district; in the remaining elections, he was elected from the SPD's party list. Bahr also served as chairman of the Sub-Committee for Disarmament and Arms Control. In 1980, Bahr became a member of the Independent Commission for Disarmament and Security under the chairmanship of Swedish politician Olof Palme. The Commission published its findings in a 1982 report titled "Common Security". Among the report's recommendations was the concept of a nuclear-free corridor in Central Europe.

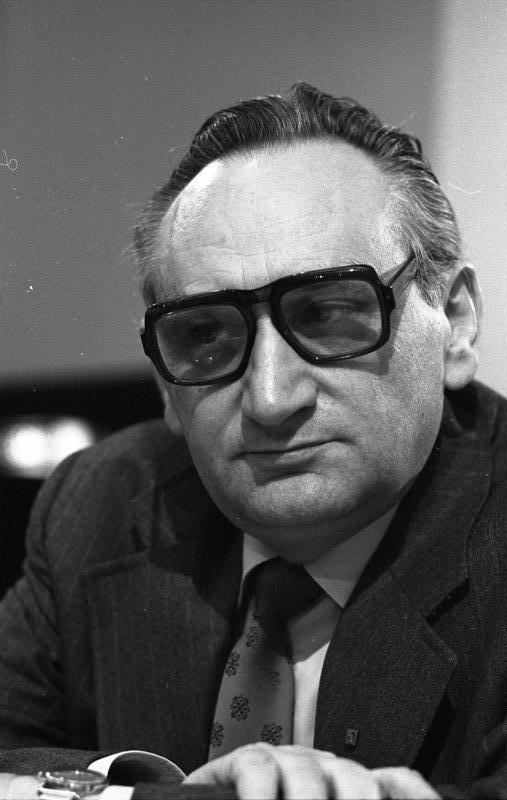
Bahr in 1978

From 1976 until 1981, he served as the executive director (Bundesgeschäftsführer) of the SPD. During his tenure in that position, Bahr drew attention amid the uproar surrounding the expulsion of Klaus Uwe Benneter, who at that time had been serving as the Federal Chairman of Jusos (JungsozialistInnen in der SPD, or “Young Socialists in the SPD". Benneter had piqued much political ire by expressing the view that the German Communist Party could be a potential coalition partner for the SPD, a statement that put the status of the youth organization into jeopardy.

On 27 November 1988 he described the demands for German reunification as "Sunday talk, (...) lies, hypocrisy that poisoned us and others, political pollution." On 1 November 1989, in an interview in the Vorwärts, Bahr said: "For heaven’s sake, let’s stop dreaming and blathering about German unity"; the Berlin Wall fell only eight days later on 9 November 1989. Five days after the fall of the Berlin Wall, he called it a "delusion to talk about reunification."

Bahr went on to publish various writings about the future of German foreign policy following the end of the Cold War (see "Publications" below). He advocated among other things for Europe and Germany to exercise greater influence in the world as a "Civilian power" (“Zivilmacht"). In 1991, Bahr promoted discussion of the creation of a potential German peace corps.

In an interview with the Frankfurter Allgemeine Zeitung in 2005, Bahr confessed that, as a teenager, he had felt a "certain pride" that Poland, France, Denmark, and Norway had been conquered so quickly by the German Wehrmacht.

== Quotes ==
"I have only ever been interested in ‘'Deutschlandpolitik'’. I didn’t become a Social Democrat in order to socialize banks. No, I became a Social Democrat because I was of the opinion that Adenauer did not really mean it [that Germany should be reunited], and that Schumacher really did mean it. I was always certain that Reunification would finally be achieved. I never lost that conviction."

"Through all that has happened, I have all that I [ever] wanted. The decisive point in the change of mentality was that Wall. We determined in 1961 that everybody was content, that nobody wanted to change the status quo. Nobody was going to help us simply to make holes in it or to make it permeable [referring to his "policy of small steps"]. So it began. And since one could not get travel visas [by negotiating with] Bonn or America or Moscow, one had to negotiate with those who were authorized to give them out."

== Selected honors ==
In 1973, Bahr was awarded the Bundesverdienstkreuz ("Federal Cross of Merit"). He was named an honorary citizen of Berlin in 2002. In 2007, Bahr was honored with the Willy Brandt Prize by the German-Norwegian Willy-Brandt-Foundation and in 2008 with both the Göttingen Peace Prize and the Marion Dönhoff Preis. Bahr received an honorary doctorate in 2008 from the Internationales Hochschulinstitut Zittau in recognition of his service to the process of unifying Europe. In January 2010, he received the Order of Merit of North Rhine-Westphalia. In 2013, he received the Kaiser Otto Prize.

== Published works ==
- Zu meiner Zeit. Blessing, Munich 1996, ISBN 3-89667-001-8 (Bahr's autobiography)
- Willy Brandts europäische Außenpolitik (Schriftenreihe der Bundeskanzler-Willy-Brandt-Stiftung, Heft 3). Berlin 1999, ISBN 3-933090-02-4
- Deutsche Interessen: Streitschrift zu Macht, Sicherheit und Außenpolitik. Goldmann, Munich 2000, ISBN 3-442-75593-X
- Der deutsche Weg: Selbstverständlich und normal. Blessing, Munich 2003, ISBN 3-89667-244-4
- "Plädoyer für eine transatlantische Arbeitsteilung". In: Jäger, Thomas / Höse, Alexander / Oppermann, Kai (eds.) 2005: Transatlantische Beziehungen: Sicherheit – Wirtschaft – Öffentlichkeit, VS Verlag für Sozialwissenschaften, Wiesbaden pp. 489–495, ISBN 3-531-14579-7
- Ostwärts und nichts vergessen! Kooperation statt Konfrontation. VSA-Verlag, Hamburg 2012, ISBN 978-3-89965-504-9.
- „Das musst du erzählen“ – Erinnerungen an Willy Brandt. Propyläen, Berlin 2013, ISBN 978-3-549-07422-0.
- Das Prinzip Apfelbaum: 11 Persönlichkeiten zur Frage „Was bleibt?“ herausgegeben von der Initiative „Mein Erbe Tut Gutes. Das Prinzip Apfelbaum“. Fotografien von Bettina Flitner. Vergangenheitsverlag, Berlin 2014, ISBN 978-3-86408-182-8.

== Literature ==
- Andreas Vogtmeier: Egon Bahr und die deutsche Frage. Zur Entwicklung der sozialdemokratischen Ost- und Deutschlandpolitik vom Kriegsende bis zur Vereinigung. (Reihe Politik- und Gesellschaftsgeschichte, Band 44), Bonn 1996.
- Daniel Friedrich Sturm: '"Metternich" in Moskau. Egon Bahrs Wandel durch Annäherung". In: Deutschland Archiv, Jg. 42, Nr. 5, 2009, pp. 841–846.
