= Ostpolitik =

Normalization of relations between West Germany and Eastern Europe

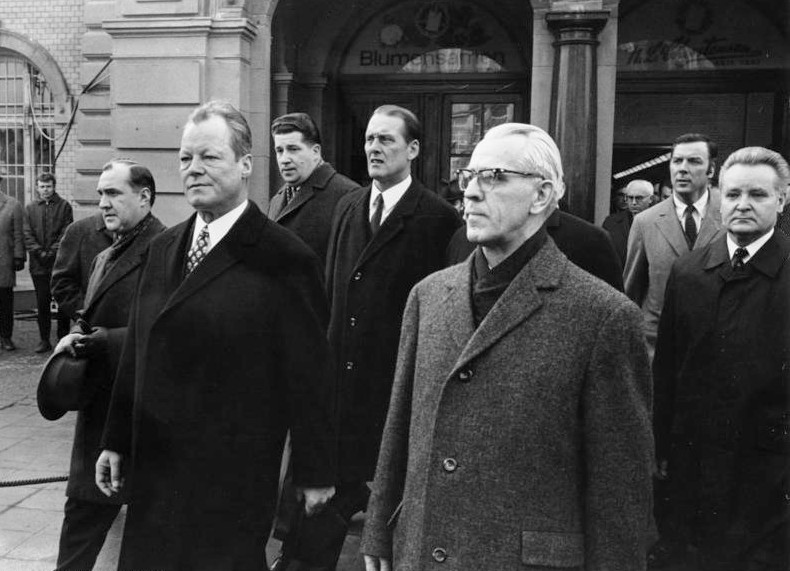
Willy Brandt (left) and Willi Stoph in Erfurt 1970, the first encounter of a Federal Chancellor with his East German counterpart, an early step in the de-escalation of the Cold War

Neue Ostpolitik (German for "new eastern policy"), or Ostpolitik (German: [ˈɔstpoliˌtiːk]) for short, was the normalization of relations between the Federal Republic of Germany (FRG, or West Germany) and Eastern Europe, particularly the German Democratic Republic (GDR, or East Germany) beginning in 1969. Influenced by Egon Bahr, who proposed "change through rapprochement" in a 1963 speech at the Evangelische Akademie Tutzing, the policies were implemented beginning with Willy Brandt, fourth Chancellor of the FRG from 1969 to 1974, and winner of the 1971 Nobel Peace Prize for his efforts to place this policy at the acme of the FRG.

Ostpolitik was an effort to break with the policies of the Christian Democratic Union (CDU), which was the elected government of West Germany from 1949 until 1969. The Christian Democrats under Konrad Adenauer and his successors tried to combat the Communist government of East Germany, while Brandt's Social Democrats tried to achieve a certain degree of cooperation with East Germany.

The term Ostpolitik has since been applied to Pope Paul VI's efforts to engage Eastern European countries during the same period. The term Nordpolitik was also coined to describe similar rapprochement policies between North and South Korea beginning in the 1980s.

== Intention ==
Following the end of World War II in 1945, Allied-occupied Germany was split into two states: the Federal Republic of Germany (FRG, or West Germany) and the German Democratic Republic (GDR, or East Germany). Initially, both governments claimed that they represented the entire German nation. However, the Federal Republic saw itself as the only German government with democratic legitimacy. Later, at the end of the 1960s, the communist government of the GDR claimed that there was no longer a common German nation as the GDR had established a socialist nation.

The Christian Democratic Union (CDU) political party dominated West German governments from 1949 to 1969. These governments refused to have any contact with the GDR government due to its undemocratic character, and the Hallstein Doctrine stipulated that the FRG would withdraw diplomatic contact from any country that established diplomatic relations with the GDR. The first application of the Hallstein Doctrine was in 1957, when the FRG withdrew recognition of Yugoslavia after it accepted a GDR ambassador. In the 1960s it became obvious that this policy would not work forever. When the Federal Republic established diplomatic relations with Israel in 1965, the Arab states countered by breaking off relations with the Federal Republic and establishing relations with the GDR.

Even before his election as Chancellor, Willy Brandt, the Social Democratic mayor of West Berlin, argued for and pursued policies that would ease tensions between the two German states, generally in the interest of cross-border commerce. His proposed new Ostpolitik held that the Hallstein Doctrine did not help to undermine the communist government or even lighten the situation of the Germans in the GDR. Brandt believed that collaboration with the communists would foster German-German encounters and trade that would undermine the communist government over the long term.

Nonetheless, he stressed that his new Ostpolitik did not neglect the close ties of the Federal Republic with Western Europe and the United States or its membership in NATO. Indeed, by the late 1960s, the unwavering stance of the Hallstein Doctrine was actually considered detrimental to US interests; numerous American advisors and policymakers, most notably Henry Kissinger, urged Bonn to be more flexible. At the same time, other West European countries entered a period of more daring policy directed to the East. When Brandt became Chancellor in 1969, the same politicians now feared a more independent German Ostpolitik, a new "Rapallo". France feared that West Germany would become more powerful after détente; Brandt ultimately resorted to pressuring the French government into endorsing his policy by holding out German financial contributions to the European Common Agricultural Policy.

== Realisation ==
The easing of tensions with the East envisioned by Ostpolitik necessarily began with the Soviet Union, the only Eastern Bloc state with which the Federal Republic had formal diplomatic ties (despite the aforementioned Hallstein Doctrine). In 1970 Brandt signed the Treaty of Moscow, renouncing the use of force and recognizing the current European borders. Later that year, Brandt signed the Treaty of Warsaw, in the process formally recognizing the People's Republic of Poland. The Treaty of Warsaw essentially repeated the Moscow treaty, and in particular reiterated the Federal Republic's recognition of the Oder–Neisse line. Treaties with other Eastern European countries followed.

The most controversial agreement was the Basic Treaty of 1972 with East Germany, establishing formal relations between the two German states for the first time since partition. The situation was complicated by the Federal Republic's longstanding claim to represent the entire German nation; Chancellor Brandt sought to smooth over this point by repeating his 1969 statement that although two states exist in Germany, they cannot regard one another as foreign countries.

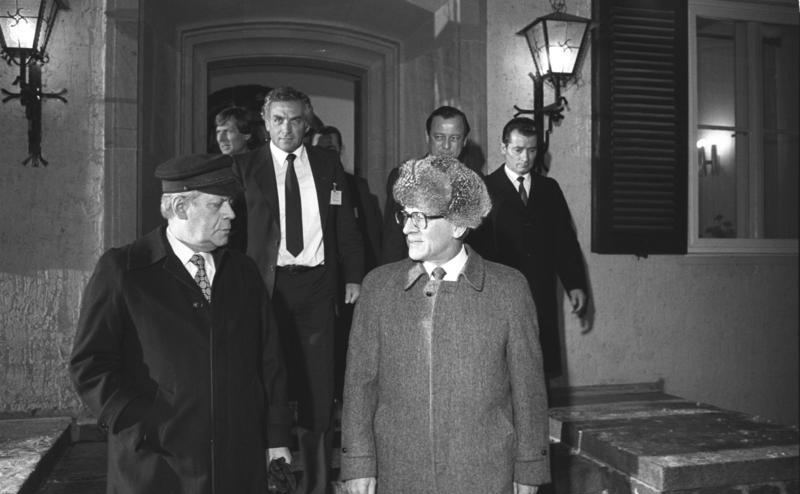
Brandt's successor Helmut Schmidt with East German party leader Erich Honecker, Döllnsee 1981

The conservative CDU opposition party in the Bundestag refused the Basic Treaty because they thought that the government gave away some Federal positions too easily. They also criticized flaws like the unintentional publishing of the Bahr-Papier, a paper in which Brandt's right hand Egon Bahr had agreed with Soviet diplomat Valentin Falin on essential issues.

The Brandt government, a coalition of Social Democrats and Free Democrats, lost a number of MPs to the CDU opposition in protest over the Basic Treaty. In April 1972 it even seemed that opposition leader Rainer Barzel had enough support to become the new Chancellor, but in the parliamentary constructive vote of no confidence in April 1972 he came two votes short. It later emerged that the GDR had paid the two CDU deputies to vote against Barzel. New general elections in November 1972 gave the Brandt government a victory, and on May 11, 1973, the Federal Parliament approved the Basic Treaty.

According to the Basic Treaty the Federal Republic and GDR accepted each other's de facto ambassadors, termed "permanent representatives" for political reasons. The mutual recognition opened the door for both states to join the United Nations, as the Federal Republic's claim to representing the entire German nation was essentially dropped by the act of recognizing its Eastern counterpart.

The CDU/CSU persuaded the FDP to defect from its coalition with the SPD in 1982, and thus CDU leader Helmut Kohl became Chancellor of West Germany. However, he did not change West German policy towards the GDR. Such was the consensus that Ostpolitik had been vindicated that Bavarian Minister-President Franz Josef Strauß, who had fiercely fought against the Basic Treaty and was Kohl's main opponent within the CDU/CSU bloc, secured the passage of a Kohl-initiated loan of 3 billion marks to the GDR in 1983. In 1987, East German leader Erich Honecker became the first ever East German head of state to visit West Germany, which was generally seen as a sign that Kohl pursued Ostpolitik.

== Policies similar to Ostpolitik ==
=== Pre-WW2 diplomacy ===
German states (Prussia and Saxony as well as unified Germany) have long faced the issues of co-existing with their eastern neighbours, whatever the differences in culture, beliefs and outlook.

Bismarck's complex foreign-policy balances included the 1887 Reinsurance Treaty with the German Empire's eastern neighbour, the Russian Empire.

Weimar Germany broke out of a degree of diplomatic isolation by signing the Treaty of Rapallo with Soviet Russia in 1922.

The Molotov–Ribbentrop Pact of 1939 defied ideological differences and established trade and geopolitical agreements between Nazi Germany and the Soviet Union.

=== Vatican diplomacy ===
Ostpolitik is also the name given to the policies of Pope Paul VI (in office: 1963–1978) towards the Soviet Union and its Eastern European satellite states. Trying to improve the condition of Christians in general and Catholics in particular behind the Iron Curtain, he engaged in dialogue with Communist authorities at several levels, receiving Foreign Minister Andrei Gromyko and USSR head of state Nikolai Podgorny in 1966 and 1967 in the Vatican. The situation of the Church in Poland, Hungary and Romania improved somewhat during his pontificate.

Among the factors behind the development of Ostpolitik in the Vatican was the Cuban missile crisis, which exemplified the risk of nuclear war. Holy See diplomats including Cardinal Agostino Casaroli became convinced that the Catholic Church had been too reluctant to engage with the communist countries. The Holy See decided that it should downplay the role of ideological conflicts in international relations and reduce the Vatican's anti-communist rhetoric. The Vatican also sought to use this approach to make the sacraments and church public life more available in the communist countries.

=== South Korea ===
South Korea's 1980s policy of Nordpolitik was named in allusion to Ostpolitik.

A similar concept is Sunshine Policy, which is the main North Korea policies of the Democratic Party of Korea.

== List of treaties ==
These are West German treaties that have Ostpolitik as a primary or secondary policy goal:

- Permit Agreement from December 17, 1963
- Treaty of Moscow from August 12, 1970
- Treaty of Warsaw from December 7, 1970
- Four Power Agreement on Berlin from September 3, 1971
- Transit Agreement from December 17, 1971
- Basic Treaty from December 21, 1972
- Treaty of Prague from December 11, 1973

Later agreements in the period of Christian Democrat Helmut Kohl (from 1982 through German reunification in 1990), although dealing with similar issues and having similar goals, are not considered to be Ostpolitik.

== See also ==
- Détente
- Inner German relations
- Sunshine policy
- Territorial evolution of Germany
