= Peace of Prague =

Peace of Prague may refer to:

- Peace of Prague (1635) - a peace settlement on 30 May 1635 between the Holy Roman Empire and most of the Empire's Lutheran provinces during the Thirty Years' War
- Peace of Prague (1866) - a peace settlement of 23 August 1866 between Prussia and Austria ending the Austro-Prussian War
- Treaty of Prague (1973) - part of Ostpolitik
