= Transit Agreement =

Transit Agreements may refer to:

- Transit Agreement (1972) Between West and East Germany and Berlin.
- Transit agreements
