= Basic Treaty =

There are a number of treaties known as the Basic Treaty

- Treaty on Basic Relations between Japan and the Republic of Korea (June 22, 1965)
- The Basic Treaty of 1972 in common usage stands for the "Treaty concerning the basis of relations between the Federal Republic of Germany and the German Democratic Republic".
- European Basic Treaty
- Bilateral Basic Treaty between Russia and Romania (July 4, 2003).
