= Treaty of Moscow (1970) =

Treaty between the Soviet Union and West Germany

- Type: Bilateral treaty
- Signed: 12 August 1970
- Location: Moscow, Russian SFSR, Soviet Union
- Original signatories: Soviet Union; West Germany
- Ratifiers: Soviet Union; West Germany

The Treaty of Moscow was signed on 12 August 1970 between the Soviet Union and West Germany. It was signed by Willy Brandt and Walter Scheel for West Germany's side and by Alexei Kosygin and Andrei Gromyko for the Soviet Union.

== Description ==
In the 1970s, West German Chancellor Willy Brandt's Ostpolitik was a policy that "abandoned, at least for the time being, its claims with respect to German self-determination and reunification, recognising de facto the existence of the German Democratic Republic (GDR) and the Oder–Neisse line".

Both sides expressed their ambition to strive for a normalisation of the relations between the European states while they kept international peace and to follow the guidelines of the Article 2 of the UN Charter.

The signees renounced the use of force and recognised the postwar borders, specifically, the Oder–Neisse line, which hived off a large portion of historical eastern Germany to Poland and the Soviet Union.

It also enshrined the division between East Germany and West Germany, thus contributing a valuable element of stability into the relationship between the two countries.

== See also ==
- Treaty of Moscow (disambiguation), for other treaties known by this name
- Treaty of Warsaw from December 7, 1970
- Four Power Agreement on Berlin from September 3, 1971
- Basic Treaty from December 21, 1972
