= Treaty of Prague (1973) =

1973 treaty between West Germany and Czechoslovakia

The Treaty of Prague was a treaty signed on 11 December 1973, in Prague, by West Germany and Czechoslovakia in which both states recognised each other diplomatically, declared the 1938 Munich Agreement to be null and void, acknowledged the inviolability of their common borders and abandoned all territorial claims.

The Treaty of Prague was a strong element of the Ostpolitik put forward by the German Chancellor Willy Brandt and supported by his ruling party in the Bundestag of the Federal Republic of Germany. Also, since Germany and Czechoslovakia had never signed any treaty since the Second World War, the treaty has been a peace treaty between the two countries. The western part of Czechoslovakia that had borders with Germany is now the Czech Republic, which has also ratified the treaty. The USSR took part in the meeting between Czechoslovakia and Germany because Czechoslovakia was under the USSR's control.
