= Treaty of Moscow =

The Treaty of Moscow may refer to:

- Treaty of Moscow (1920), a non-aggression pact between Soviet Russia and Georgia
- Soviet–Lithuanian Peace Treaty (1920) also known as Moscow Peace Treaty, a treaty between the Soviet Russia and Lithuania
- Treaty of Moscow (1921), a friendship treaty between Soviet Russia and the Grand National Assembly of Turkey (TBMM)
- Treaty of Moscow (1939), also known as the Molotov–Ribbentrop Pact or the Treaty of Non-Aggression between Germany and the Soviet Union
- Moscow Peace Treaty (1940), a treaty between the Soviet Union and Finland, ending the Winter War
- Moscow Armistice (1944), was signed between Finland on one side and the Soviet Union and United Kingdom on the other side on 19 September 1944, ending the Continuation War
- Moscow Treaty (1963), also known as the Partial Test Ban Treaty, banned nuclear weapon tests in the atmosphere, in outer space and under water
- Treaty of Moscow (1970), a treaty between the Soviet Union and West Germany
- Russia–Chechen Peace Treaty (1997) also known as Moscow Peace Treaty, a treaty between the Russia and the Chechen Republic of Ichkeria
- Treaty of Moscow (2002) also known as Treaty on Strategic Offensive Reductions (SORT), a treaty between Russia and the United States for a reduction in strategic nuclear warheads

Also:

- Moscow Conference (1943) — between the major Allies of World War II took place during October 18 to November 11, 1943, at the Moscow Kremlin and Spiridonovka Palace
- Moscow Agreement (1945) — issued at the end of the Moscow Conference of 1945 — was a joint declaration by the Allies which covered a number of issues resulting from the end of World War II
