= Basic Treaty, 1972 =

Treaty between East and West Germany

Basic Treaty
Treaty concerning the basis of relations between the Federal Republic of Germany and the German Democratic Republic
- Type: Bilateral treaty
- Signed: 21 December 1972
- Location: East Berlin
- Effective: 1973
- Parties: West Germany; East Germany

The Basic Treaty (German: Grundlagenvertrag, pronounced [ˈɡʁʊntlaːɡn̩fɛɐ̯ˌtʁaːk]) is the shorthand name for the Treaty concerning the basis of relations between the Federal Republic of Germany and the German Democratic Republic (German: Vertrag über die Grundlagen der Beziehungen zwischen der Bundesrepublik Deutschland und der Deutschen Demokratischen Republik). The Federal Republic of Germany and German Democratic Republic (GDR) recognized each other as sovereign states for the first time, an abandonment of West Germany's Hallstein Doctrine in favor of Ostpolitik.

After the entry into force of the Four-Power Agreement from 1971, the two German states began negotiations over a Basic Treaty. As for the Transit Agreement of 1972, the discussions were led by the Under-Secretaries of State Egon Bahr (for the Federal Republic of Germany) and Michael Kohl (for the German Democratic Republic). As part of the Ostpolitik of Chancellor Willy Brandt, the treaty was signed on 21 December 1972 in East Berlin.

The signing of the treaty in December 1972 paved the way for both German states to be recognised by the international community. Diplomatic relations were opened between the German Democratic Republic and:

- Australia (December 1972),
- the United Kingdom, France and the Netherlands (February 1973),
- the United States (December 1974).

Both German states were also admitted to the United Nations on 18 September 1973.

Under the terms of this treaty, the two states established de facto embassies known as "permanent missions", headed by "permanent representatives", who served as de facto ambassadors. West Germany sent its first permanent representative in February 1974, but formal diplomatic relations were never established until German reunification (in October 1990).

== See also ==
- Treaty of Moscow (1970)
- Transit Agreement (1972)
- Four Power Agreement on Berlin
