= Four Power Agreement on Berlin =

1971 multilateral agreement

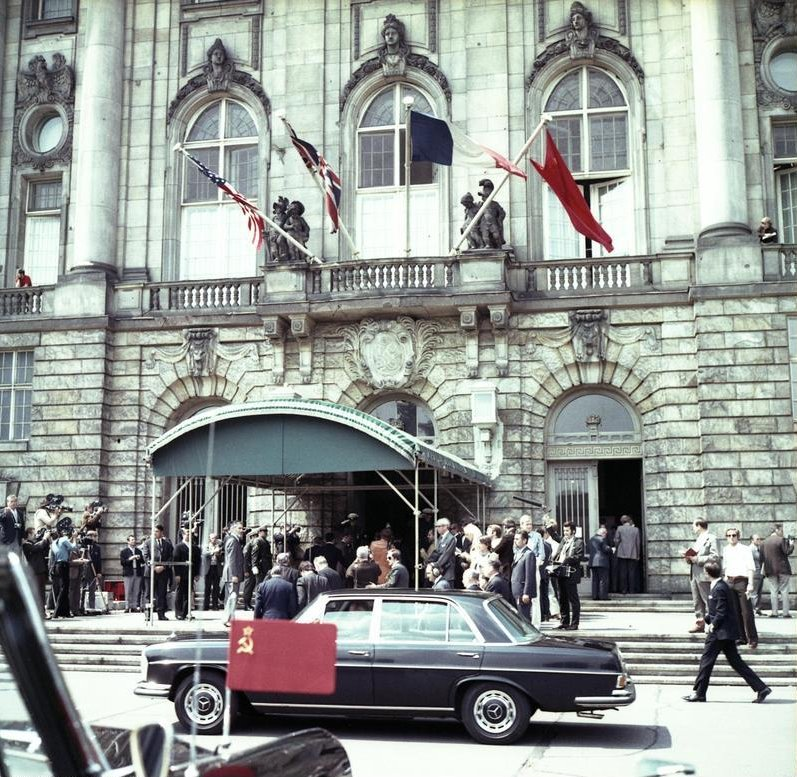
Arrival of the four foreign ministers at the Allied Control Council headquarters building for the signing of the final protocol on 3 June 1972

The Four Power Agreement on Berlin, also known as the Berlin Agreement or the Quadripartite Agreement on Berlin, was agreed on 3 September 1971 by the reconvened Allied Control Council, consisting of ambassadors of the four wartime Allied powers. The four foreign ministers, Sir Alec Douglas-Home of the United Kingdom, Andrei Gromyko of the Soviet Union, Maurice Schumann of France, and William P. Rogers of the United States signed the agreement and put it into force at a meeting of the Council of Foreign Ministers in West Berlin on 3 June 1972. The agreement was not a treaty and required no formal ratification.

== Overview ==
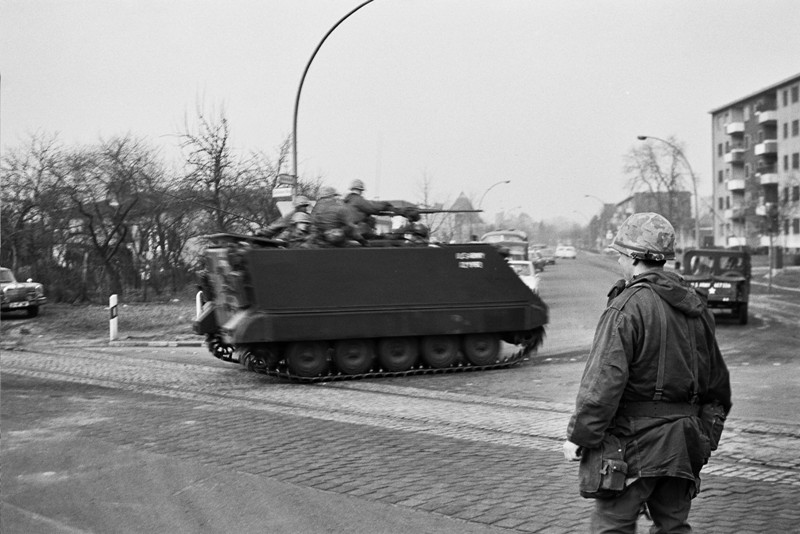
In 1969 Berlin Brigade troops of the U.S. Army roar through morning rush hour traffic in a Zehlendorf residential district, a routine reminder that Berlin was still legally occupied by the World War II victors.

By reconfirming the post-1945 existence of the rights and responsibilities of the Four Powers for the future of Berlin and Germany as a whole, which the Soviets had earlier claimed to have abrogated (as a result of the Berlin crisis of 1959–1962), the Agreement laid the foundation for a series of east–west agreements which ushered in the period usually known as détente. It also re-established ties between East and West Berlin, improved travel and communications between the two parts of the city and brought numerous improvements for the residents of the Western Sectors.

In order to reach such improvements, the ultimate political definition of the status of Berlin was purposely left vague, thus it preserved the differing legal positions of the two sides.

The Quadripartite Agreement is drawn up "in the English, French and Russian languages, all texts being equally authentic." Thus, there is no authentic text in the German language. The translations used by the then-extant two German states had some differences. (Note: Mahnke, Hans Heinrich, ed. (1987). "118. Viermächte-Abkommen vom 3. September 1971 (sowie die authentischen alliierten Texte in Englisch, Französisch und Russisch)". Dokumente zur Berlin-Frage 1967-1986. (Schriften des Forschungsinstituts der Deutschen Gesellschaft für Auswärtige Politik e.V.: Reihe Internationale Politik und Wirtschaft 52/II) (in German). München: Oldenbourg Wissenschaftsverlag. pp. 190–211. ISBN 3-486-54311-3. (GDR translation as footnotes: Vierseitiges Abkommen))

After the agreement entered into force, the Soviet Union used this vague wording in an effort to loosen West Berlin's ties with the Federal Republic of Germany (West Germany). However, the agreement contributed greatly both to a reduction of tensions between East and West over Berlin and to expanded contacts between the two parts of Germany. As such, it made an important contribution to the process that resulted in the reunification of Germany in 1990.

Along with the Allied agreement, the Basic Treaty (German: Grundlagenvertrag) which was signed on 21 December 1972 and came into force in June 1973, recognized both German states. The two countries pledged to respect one another's sovereignty and maintain diplomatic relations. Previously, both had competing and evolving claims to be the sole legitimate German state. Under the terms of the treaty, diplomatic missions were to be exchanged and commercial, tourist, cultural, and communications relations established. Under the agreement and the treaty, in September 1973, both German states joined the United Nations.

These treaties were part of a breakthrough series of international agreements which were seen by some as formalizing the Cold War's division of Europe, while others saw this as the start of the process that led to the end of the Cold War. Mary Sarotte wrote in 2001 that "...despite all the fears, both sides managed to make many bargains as a result of the détente dialogue."

While Part II of the agreement stated that the further development of the relationship between West Germany and West Berlin, whereby West Berlin was still not part in the sense of a constitutive part of West Germany and could not be governed by it, at the same time de facto - not registered in itself - it was established that the further development of relations between the German Democratic Republic (East Germany) and East Berlin, with East Berlin still not being part of East Germany in the sense of a constitutive part and also not being governed by it.

== See also ==
- Berlin Declaration
- Four Power (disambiguation)
- Treaty of Moscow (1970)
- Treaty of Warsaw (1970)
- Basic Treaty, 1972
- Transit Agreement (1972)
- Potsdam Conference
- Potsdam Agreement
- Council of Foreign Ministers
- Allied Control Council
- Allied Kommandatura
- Treaty on the Final Settlement With Respect to Germany
- Steinstücken
