= Treaty of Warsaw (1970) =

Treaty between West Germany and Poland

- Signed: 7 December 1970
- Signatories: Poland, West Germany
- Languages: German, Polish

The Treaty of Warsaw (German: Warschauer Vertrag, Polish: Traktat warszawski) was a treaty between the Federal Republic of Germany (West Germany) and the Polish People’s Republic. It was signed by Chancellor Willy Brandt and Prime Minister Józef Cyrankiewicz at the Presidential Palace on 7 December 1970, and it was ratified by the West German Bundestag on 17 May 1972.

In the treaty, both sides committed themselves to nonviolence and accepted the existing border—the Oder–Neisse line, imposed on Germany by the Soviet Union in 1945 following the end of World War II. This had been a quite sensitive topic since then, as Poland was concerned that a German government might seek to reclaim some of the former eastern territories. From the Polish perspective, the transfer of these regions was considered to be a compensation for the former Polish territory east of the Curzon Line ("Kresy"), which had been annexed by the Soviet Union in 1939.

In West Germany, Brandt was heavily criticised by the conservative CDU/CSU opposition, who marked his policy as a betrayal of national interests. At the time the treaty was signed, West German commentators sought to maintain that this could not be a final settlement of the Polish border issue, because Article IV of this treaty stated that previous treaties like the Potsdam Agreement were not superseded by this latest agreement; so it might be argued that the provisions of this treaty could be changed by a final peace treaty between Germany and the Allies of World War II—as provided for in the Potsdam Agreement.

The Treaty of Warsaw was an important element of the Ostpolitik, put forward by Chancellor Brandt and supported by his ruling Social Democratic Party of Germany. In the aftermath of the 1990 Treaty on the Final Settlement with Respect to Germany, the Oder–Neisse line was reaffirmed without any reservation with the German–Polish Border Treaty, signed on 14 November 1990 by re-united Germany and Poland.

== See also ==
- Treaty of Zgorzelec
- Warschauer Kniefall
