= Transit Agreement (1972) =

1972 treaty between West Germany and East Germany

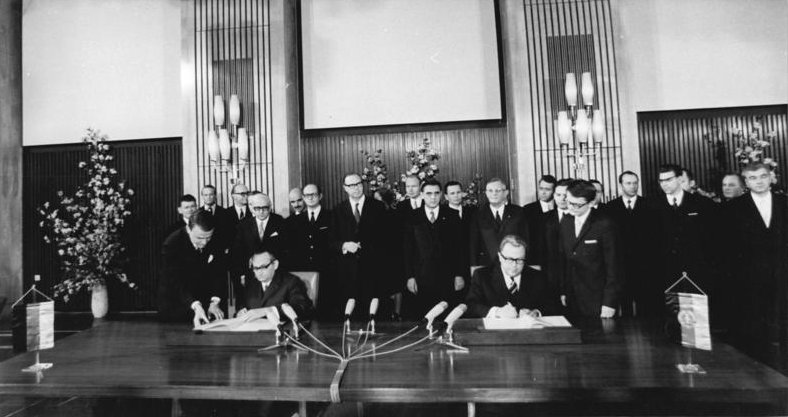
- Egon Bahr (left) and Michael Kohl (right) signing the Transit Agreement
- Type: Bilateral treaty
- Signed: 17 December 1971
- Location: Palais Schaumburg, Bonn
- Effective: 3 June 1972
- Signatories: Egon Bahr; Michael Kohl
- Parties: West Germany; East Germany

The Transit Agreement (German: Transitabkommen), signed 17 December 1971, arranged access to and from West Berlin from West Germany, secured the right of West Berliners to visit East Berlin and East Germany, and secured the rights of East German citizens to visit West Germany, although only in cases of family emergency.

== See also ==
- Four Power Agreement on Berlin
- Basic Treaty
