= Taking a knee =

Taking a knee can refer to

- Genuflection, the act of dropping to one knee as a sign of worship or respect
- Taking the knee, a form of anti-racism protest which originated in U.S. national anthem protests (2016–present)
- Quarterback kneel
- Kneeling, any of numerous customs involving placing one or both knees on the ground

== See also ==
- Kniefall von Warschau ("Warsaw genuflection"), a gesture of humility and penance by West German Chancellor Willy Brandt in 1970 towards the victims of the Warsaw Ghetto Uprising
