= Willy Brandt Monument (Warsaw) =

Willy Brandt Monument in Warsaw
- Pomnik Willy'ego Brandta w Warszawie
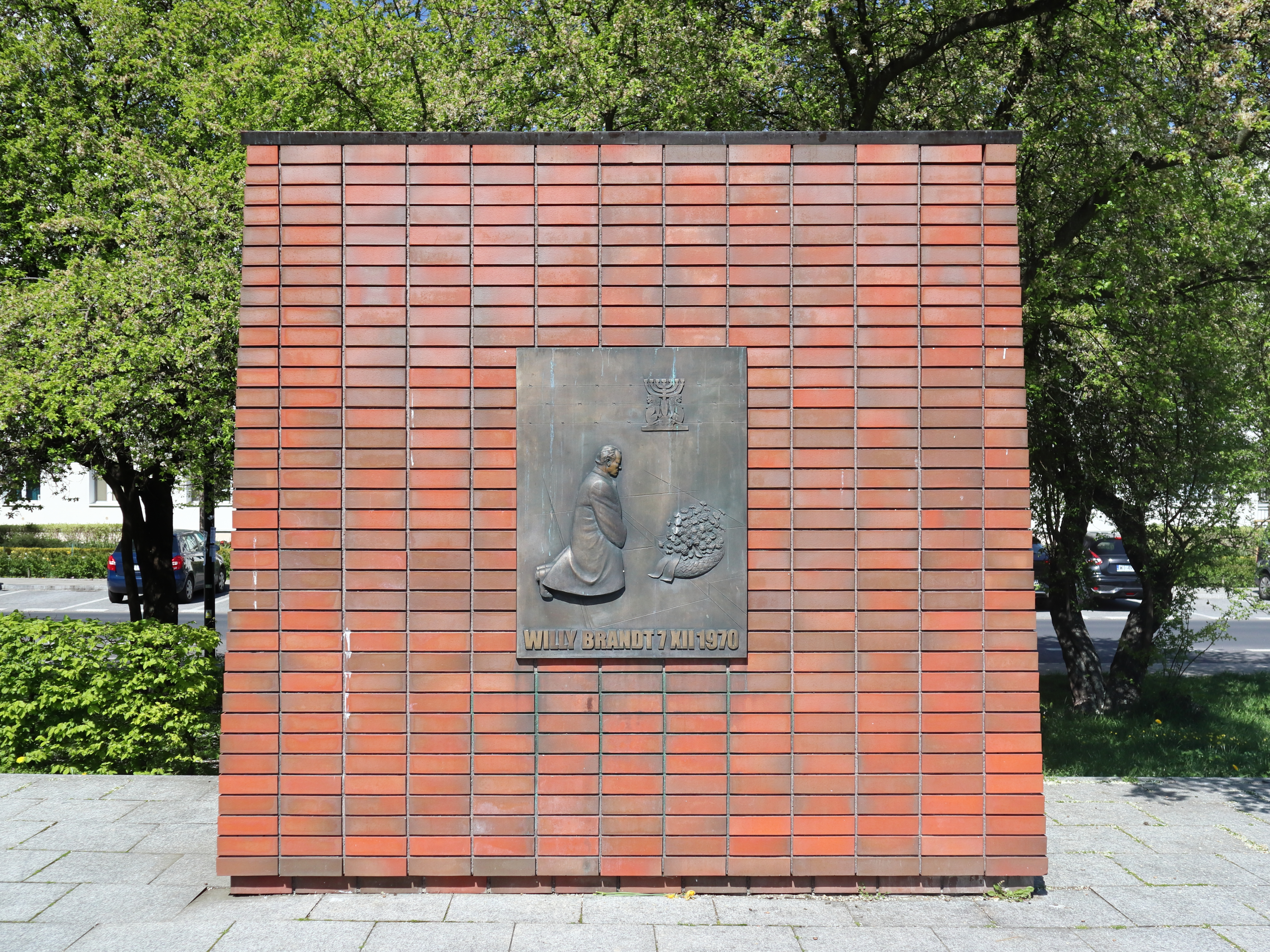
- Monument to Willy Brandt in Warsaw
- Interactive map of Willy Brandt Monument in Warsaw
- Location: Willy Brandt Square in Warsaw
- Coordinates: 52°14′58″N 20°59′29″E
- Designer: Wiktoria Czechowska-Antoniewska, Piotr Drachal
- Height: 3 m (9.8 ft)
- Opening date: 6 December 2000
- Dedicated to: Willy Brandt and the Warschauer Kniefall

The Willy Brandt Monument in Warsaw is a monument located in Willy Brandt Square, Warsaw, Poland, near the Museum of the History of Polish Jews. It commemorates German chancellor Willy Brandt and the Warschauer Kniefall, Brandt's act of kneeling at a monument to the Warsaw Ghetto Uprising during his visit in 1970.

It was unveiled on 6 December 2000, the day before 30th anniversary of the event, by Chancellor of Germany Gerhard Schröder and Prime Minister of Poland Jerzy Buzek in the presence of Brigitte Seebacher-Brandt and Günter Grass.

The author of the bronze plaque depicting a kneeling Willy Brandt was Wiktoria Czechowska-Antoniewska, and the author of the architectural design of the monument was Piotr Drachal.

== Bibliography ==
- "Pomnik Willy'ego Brandta". Urząd Dzielnicy Śródmieście m.st. Warszawy. srodmiescie.art.pl. Archived from the original on 2013-10-17.
- "Röben Ceramika Budowlana głównym fundatorem pomnika Kanclerza Willy Brandta w Warszawie". roben.pl. 6 December 2000. Archived from the original on 2013-10-17.
