= Letter of Reconciliation of the Polish Bishops to the German Bishops =

1965 pastoral letter

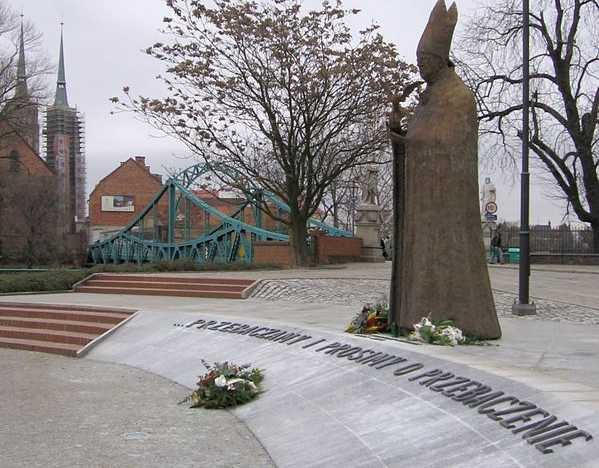
Memorial to Bolesław Kominek. The words below the statue ("... we forgive and ask for forgiveness") are a quote from the Letter, which was authored by Kominek.

The Pastoral Letter of the Polish Bishops to their German Brothers (Polish: Orędzie biskupów polskich do ich niemieckich braci w Chrystusowym urzędzie pasterskim; German: Hirtenbrief der polnischen Bischöfe an ihre deutschen Amtsbrüder) was a pastoral letter sent on 18 November 1965 by Polish bishops of the Catholic Church to their German counterparts. It was foremost an invitation to the 1000th anniversary of Poland's Christianization in 966. In this invitation letter the bishops asked for cooperation not only with Catholics but with Protestants as well.

While recalling past and recent historical events, the bishops stretched out their hands in forgiveness and are asking for forgiveness. Here referred to as Letter of Reconciliation of the Polish Bishops to the German Bishops, it is actually only one part of the extensive groundbreaking invitation and letter, where they declared: "We forgive and ask for forgiveness" (referring to the crimes of World War II, particularly German crimes to the Polish nation.)

== Significance ==
It was one of the first attempts at reconciliation after the tragedies of the war, in which Germany invaded Poland and committed numerous war crimes to the country; both countries lost millions of people, while millions more, both Poles and Germans, had to flee from their homes or were forcibly resettled after the war. Pope Pius XII had nominated German bishops over Polish dioceses, which was seen as the Holy See's recognition of the German conquest, and generated negative Polish feelings against the Vatican. A much larger part was the invitation and the attempt of the Catholic bishops to gain distance from the Communists who were ruling Poland.

Among prominent supporters of this letter was Kraków's Archbishop, Karol Wojtyła, who later became Pope John Paul II in 1978. The letter was answered jointly by bishops of both East and West Germany, but the contents of the reply have been assessed by Polish historians as disappointing.

== Reaction ==
Widely publicised in Poland's churches, the letter drew a strong reaction from the Communist authorities of the People's Republic of Poland. Władysław Gomułka saw it as clearly aimed at countering his propaganda, which saw West Germany as the main external enemy of Poland and continued hostility between Poland and West Germany as one of the main guarantees of social order in the Recovered Territories.

The Communist authorities reacted by expressing anti-German and anti-Catholic sentiment. The Primate of Poland, Stefan Wyszyński, was denied a passport for his trip to Rome and on January 15, 1966, Gomułka announced preparations for state celebrations of the 1000 Years of the Polish State, intended as a countermeasure against the church-sponsored celebrations of 1000 years of the baptism of Poland. Most German linguists were forced to sign a letter of protest; those who refused were fired from their universities. In addition,

the authorities twice refused permission for a planned visit of Pope Paul VI to Poland in 1966. The following year the Polish United Workers' Party planned to limit the number of religious schools, which was also seen as a penalty for the Letter of Reconciliation. The anti-church campaign lasted until Gomułka's downfall in 1970.

== See also ==
- Nazi crimes against the Polish nation
- Generalplan Ost
- Expulsion of Germans after World War II
- Flight and expulsion of Germans from Poland during and after World War II
- World War II atrocities in Poland
- Warschauer Kniefall
