= Willy Brandt =

Chancellor of West Germany from 1969 to 1974

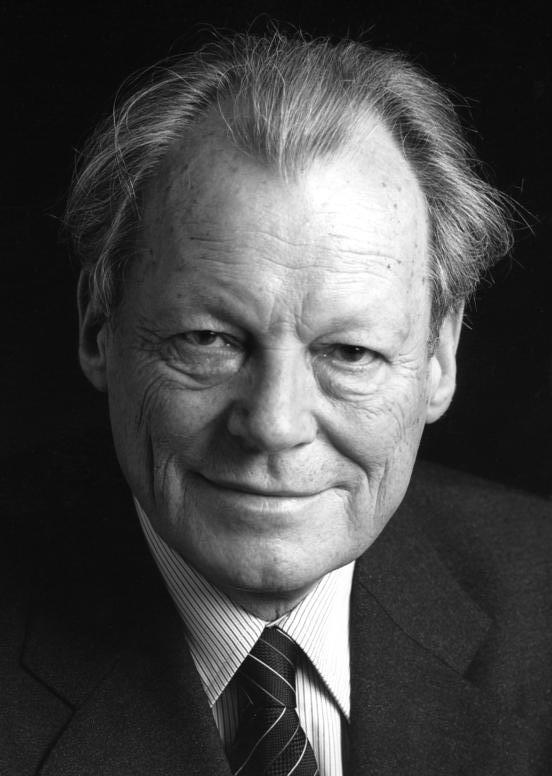
- Official portrait, 1980

Chancellor of Germany (Note: Due to the division of Germany, Willy Brandt was only the Federal Chancellor in West Germany. The term West Germany is the common English name for the Federal Republic of Germany between its formation on 23 May 1949 and the German reunification through the accession of East Germany on 3 October 1990. The office of the chancellor did not exist in East Germany.)
- In office 22 October 1969 – 7 May 1974
- President: Gustav Heinemann
- Vice-Chancellor: Walter Scheel
- Preceded by: Kurt Georg Kiesinger
- Succeeded by: Walter Scheel (acting); Helmut Schmidt

Leader of the Social Democratic Party
- In office 16 February 1964 – 14 June 1987
- Federal Manager: Hans-Jürgen Wischnewski; Holger Börner; Egon Bahr; Peter Glotz
- Preceded by: Erich Ollenhauer
- Succeeded by: Hans-Jochen Vogel

Vice-Chancellor of Germany
- In office 1 December 1966 – 22 October 1969
- Chancellor: Kurt Georg Kiesinger
- Preceded by: Hans-Christoph Seebohm
- Succeeded by: Walter Scheel

Minister for Foreign Affairs
- In office 1 December 1966 – 20 October 1969
- Chancellor: Kurt Georg Kiesinger
- Preceded by: Gerhard Schröder
- Succeeded by: Walter Scheel

Governing Mayor of West Berlin
- In office 3 October 1957 – 30 November 1966
- Mayor: Franz Amrehn; Heinrich Albertz
- Preceded by: Otto Suhr
- Succeeded by: Heinrich Albertz

President of the German Bundesrat
- In office 1 November 1957 – 31 October 1958
- First Vice President: Kurt Sieveking
- Preceded by: Kurt Sieveking
- Succeeded by: Wilhelm Kaisen

President of the Abgeordnetenhaus of Berlin
- In office 11 January 1955 – 2 October 1957
- Preceded by: Otto Suhr
- Succeeded by: Kurt Landsberg
Parliamentary constituencies
Member of the Bundestag for North Rhine-Westphalia
In office 20 October 1969 – 8 October 1992
Preceded by	Multi-member district
Succeeded by	Heike Niggemeyer
Member of the Abgeordnetenhaus of Berlin
In office 3 December 1950 – 14 March 1971
Preceded by	Multi-member district
Succeeded by	Multi-member district
Delegate to the Bundestag for West Berlin
In office 17 October 1961 – 27 December 1961
Preceded by	Multi-member district
Succeeded by	Hans Wellmann
In office 7 September 1949 – 15 October 1957
Preceded by	Constituency established
Succeeded by	Multi-member district

Personal details
- Born: Herbert Ernst Karl Frahm; 18 December 1913 Free City of Lübeck, German Empire
- Died: 8 October 1992 (aged 78) Unkel, Rhineland-Palatinate, Germany
- Resting place: Zehlendorf, Berlin
- Citizenship: Germany (revoked 1938; regained 1948); Norway (1940–1948)
- Party: Social Democratic Party (1930–1931; from 1948)
- Other political affiliations: Socialist Workers' Party (1931–1946)
- Spouses: Carlotta Thorkildsen (m. 1941; div. 1948); Rut Hansen (m. 1948; div. 1980); Brigitte Seebacher (m. 1983)
- Children: 4, including Matthias
- Awards: Nobel Peace Prize (1971)

Willy Brandt (German: [ˈvɪliː ˈbʁant]; born Herbert Ernst Karl Frahm; 18 December 1913 – 8 October 1992) was a German politician and statesman who was leader of the Social Democratic Party of Germany (SPD) from 1964 to 1987 and concurrently served as the chancellor of West Germany from 1969 to 1974. He was awarded the Nobel Peace Prize in 1971 for his efforts to strengthen cooperation in Western Europe through the EEC and to achieve reconciliation between West Germany and the countries of Eastern Europe. He was the first Social Democratic chancellor since 1930.

Fleeing to Norway and then Sweden during the Nazi regime and working as a left-wing journalist, he took the name Willy Brandt as a pseudonym to avoid detection by Nazi agents, and then formally adopted the name in 1948. Brandt earned initial fame as governing mayor of West Berlin. He served as the foreign minister and as the vice chancellor in Kurt Georg Kiesinger's cabinet, and became chancellor in 1969.

As chancellor, he maintained West Germany's close alignment with the United States and focused on strengthening European integration in Western Europe, while launching the new policy of Ostpolitik aimed at improving relations with Eastern Europe. Brandt was controversial on both the right wing, for his Ostpolitik, and on the left wing, for his support of American policies, including his silence on the Vietnam War that he broke only in 1973, and right-wing authoritarian regimes. The Brandt Report became a recognised measure for describing the general North–South divide in world economics and politics between an affluent North and a poor South. Brandt was also known for his fierce anti-communist policies at the domestic level, culminating in the Radikalenerlass (Anti-Radical Decree) in 1972. In 1970, while visiting a memorial to the Warsaw Ghetto Uprising crushed by the Germans, Brandt unexpectedly knelt and meditated in silence, a moment remembered as the Kniefall von Warschau.

Brandt resigned as chancellor in 1974, after Günter Guillaume, one of his closest aides, was exposed as an agent of the Stasi, the East German secret service. Brandt died from colon cancer in 1992, aged 78.

== Early life and World War II ==
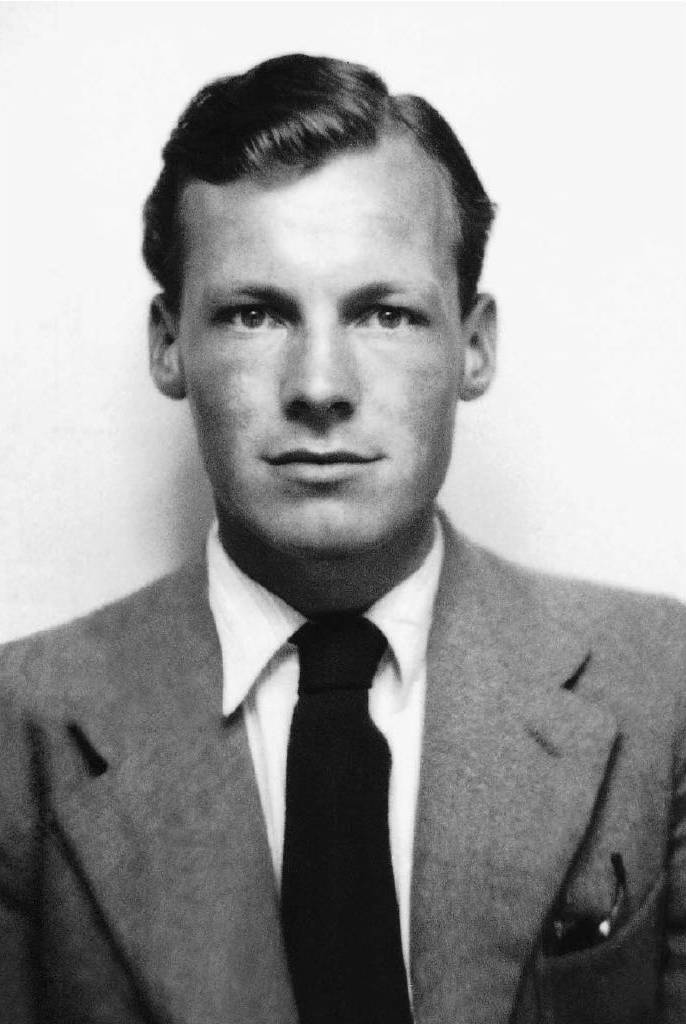
Herbert Frahm's Norwegian passport photograph, c. 1938–1940

Willy Brandt was born Herbert Ernst Karl Frahm in the Free City of Lübeck (now in Schleswig-Holstein) on 18 December 1913. His mother was Martha Luise Wilhelmine Frahm (née Ewert; 1894–1969), a single parent, who worked as a cashier for a department store. His father was a teacher from Hamburg named John Heinrich Möller (1887–1958), whom Brandt never met. As his mother worked six days a week, he was mainly brought up by his mother's stepfather, Ludwig Frahm. He joined the "Socialist Youth" in 1929 and at age 16 became a full member of the Social Democratic Party (SPD) in 1930 despite the age minimum normally being 18. He also wrote for the Volksbote, a local Social Democrat daily, under editor-in-chief Julius Leber, who would have a "decisive influence" on him.

He, along with half the youth-wing of the Lübeck SPD, left the party to join the more left wing Socialist Workers Party (SAP) in October 1931, which was allied to the POUM in Spain and, more significant to Brandt, had close ties with the Norwegian Labour Party. His break with Leber and the SPD lost him the promised financial support for university studies and his job at the Volksbote. After passing his Abitur in 1932 at Johanneum zu Lübeck, he took work at the shipbroker and ship's agent F.H. Bertling. In 1933 he left Germany for Norway to escape Nazi persecution. It was at this time that he adopted the pseudonym Willy Brandt to avoid detection by Nazi agents. In 1934, he took part in the founding of the International Bureau of Revolutionary Youth Organizations, and was elected to its secretariat. Willy Brandt became one of Wilhelm Reich's subjects for his experiments on the electrophysiology of pleasure and anxiety.

Brandt was in Germany from September to December 1936, disguised as a Norwegian student named Gunnar Gaasland. The real Gunnar Gaasland was married to Gertrud Meyer from Lübeck in a marriage of convenience to protect her from deportation. Meyer had joined Brandt in Norway in July 1933. In 1937, during the Spanish Civil War, Brandt worked in Spain as a journalist. In 1938, the German government revoked his citizenship, so he applied for Norwegian citizenship. In 1940, he was arrested in Norway by occupying German forces, but his real identity was not uncovered as he wore a Norwegian uniform. Upon his release, he escaped to neutral Sweden. In August 1940, he became a Norwegian citizen, receiving his passport from the Norwegian legation in Stockholm, where he lived until the end of the war. He lectured in Sweden on 1 December 1940 at Bommersvik College about problems experienced by the social democrats in Nazi Germany and the occupied countries at the start of the World War II. In exile in Norway and Sweden, he learned Norwegian and Swedish. He spoke Norwegian fluently, and retained a close relationship with Norway.

In late 1946, Brandt returned to Berlin, working for the Norwegian government. In 1948, he re-joined the SPD and became a German citizen again, formally adopting the pseudonym Willy Brandt as his legal name. In 2021, it became known that Brandt served as a paid informant for the United States Counterintelligence Corps from 1948 to 1952. He supplied reports on circumstances in the East Germany, including the situation of East German authorities and industries, as well as Soviet troops. According to Thomas Boghardt, Brandt and SPD man Hans Emil Hirschfeld received 200,000 German Mark from the Americans in 1950 for promoting his political career, after both had met with the Americans at the German CIA headquarters in Frankfurt. Both were sworn to "secrecy". The Americans wanted to strengthen the SPD over the Communists in Berlin. Over the next two years, Hirschfeld received a further 106,000 Marks. Even after the end of his informant activities, he is said to have remained in contact with US intelligence.

== Early political career ==
Brandt was elected to the West German Bundestag (the federal parliament) in the 1949 West German federal election as a SPD delegate from West Berlin, serving there until 1957. Concurrently, he was elected as an SPD representative to the Abgeordnetenhaus (the state-level parliament) of West Berlin in the 1950 West Berlin state election, and served there through 1971. In the 1969 West German federal election, he was again elected to the Bundestag, but as a delegate from North Rhine-Westphalia, and remained in the Bundestag as a delegate from that state until his death in 1992.

In 1950, Brandt, while a member of the Bundestag and the editor-in-chief of the Berliner Stadtblatt, received a secret payment of about 170,000 Deutsche Mark from the U.S. government (equivalent to €460,386 in 2021).

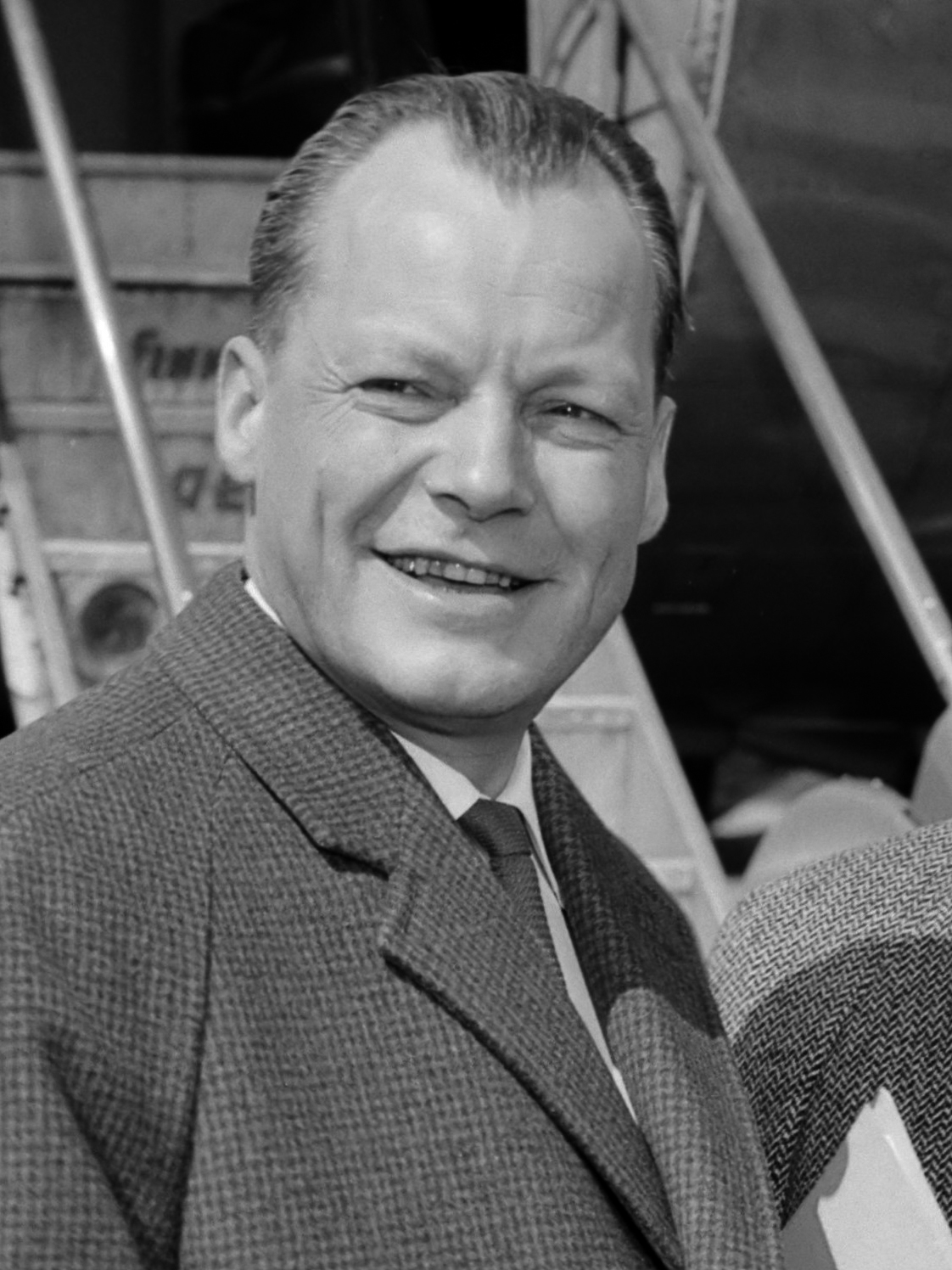
Brandt in 1959 as Governing Mayor of West Berlin

From October 1957 to 1966, Willy Brandt served as Governing Mayor of West Berlin, during a period of increasing tension in East–West relations that led to the construction of the Berlin Wall. In his first year as mayor of Berlin, he also served as the president of the Bundesrat in Bonn. He was an outspoken critic of Soviet repression of the 1956 Hungarian Uprising and of Nikita Khrushchev's 1958 proposal that Berlin receive the status of a "free city". He was supported by the influential publisher Axel Springer.

As mayor of West Berlin, Brandt accomplished much in the way of urban development. New hotels, office blocks, and flats were constructed, while both Schloss Charlottenburg and the Reichstag building were restored. Sections of the "Stadtring" Bundesautobahn 100 inner city motorway were opened, while a major housing programme was carried out, with roughly 20,000 new dwellings built each year during his time in office.

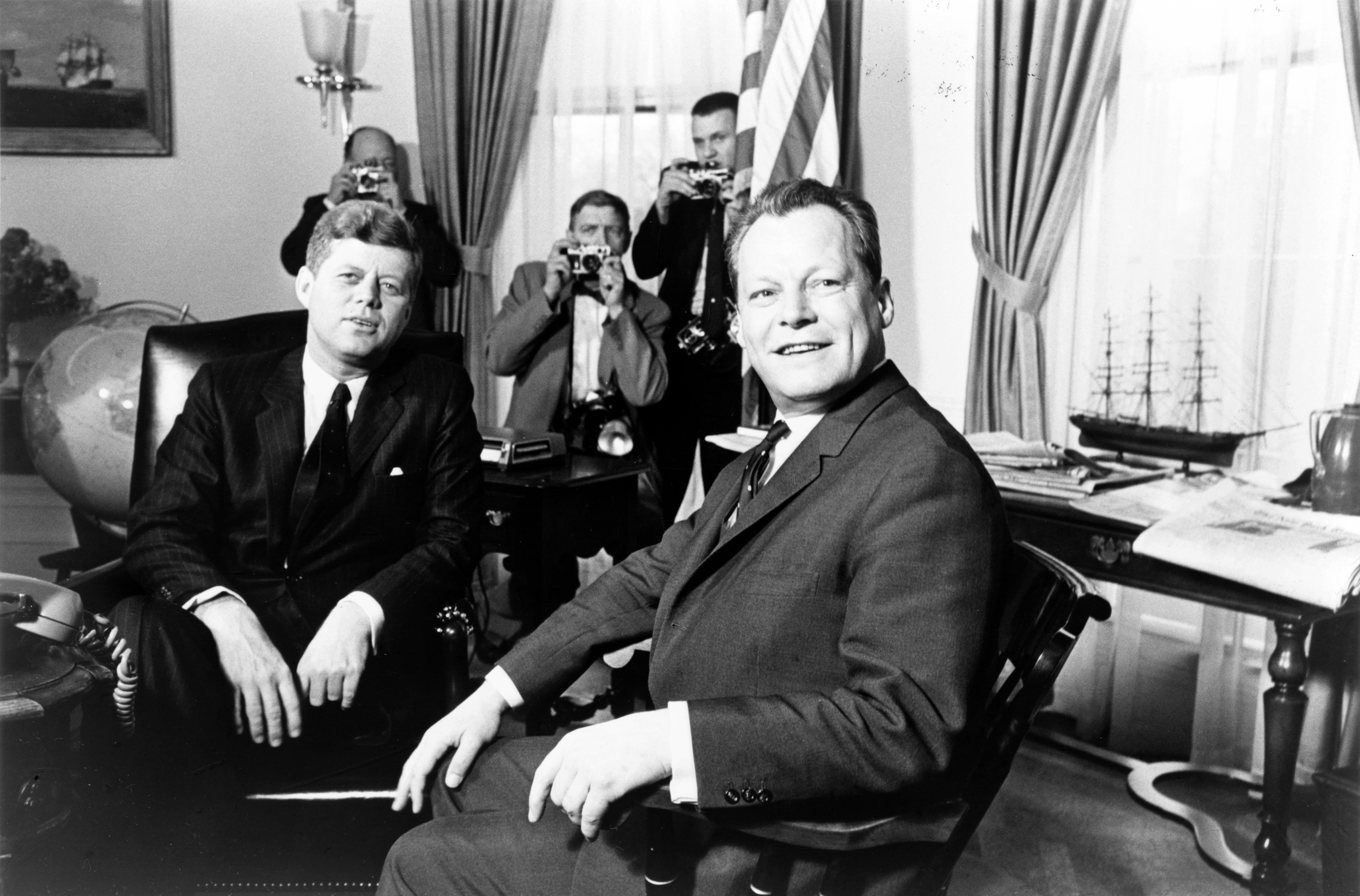
Brandt meeting John F. Kennedy in 1961

At the start of 1961, U.S. President John F. Kennedy saw Brandt as a figure destined for high office in West Germany and was hoping he would replace Konrad Adenauer as chancellor following elections later that year. Kennedy made this preference clear by inviting Brandt, the West German opposition leader, to an official meeting at the White House a month before meeting with Adenauer, the country's leader. For the president, Brandt stood for Germany's future and for overcoming traditional Cold War thinking.

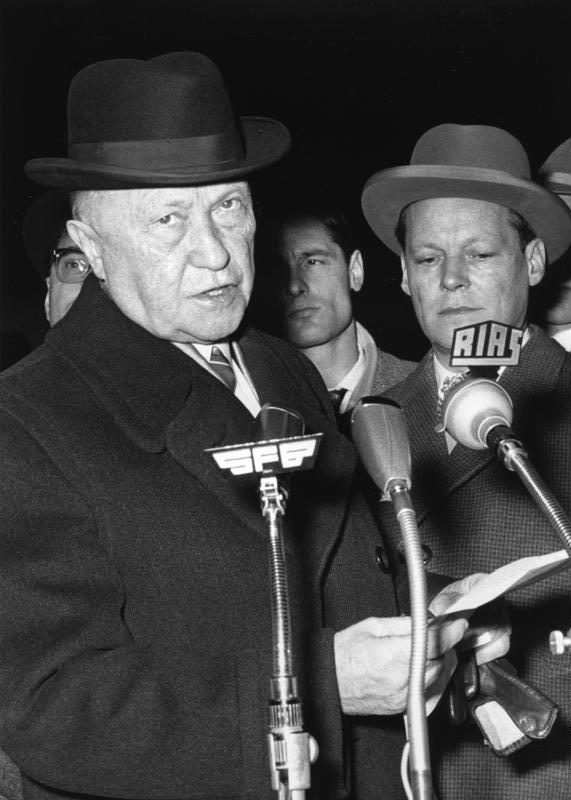
Chancellor Adenauer (left) and Mayor Brandt (right) at a press conference in Berlin following the construction of the Berlin Wall, 1961

The diplomatic snub strained relations between Kennedy and Adenauer further during an especially tense time for Berlin. However, following the building of the Berlin Wall in August 1961, Brandt was disappointed and angry with Kennedy. Speaking in Berlin three days later, Brandt criticised Kennedy, asserting, "Berlin expects more than words. It expects political action." He also wrote Kennedy a highly critical public letter in which he warned that the development was liable "to arouse doubts about the ability of the three Allied Powers to react and their determination" and he called the situation "a state of accomplished extortion". Kennedy was furious, but managed to defuse the tension by sending his vice president, Lyndon B. Johnson, to Berlin. In June 1963, Brandt figured prominently in the staging of Kennedy's triumphant visit to West Berlin.

Brandt became the chairman of the SPD in 1964, a post that he retained until 1987, longer than any other party chairman since the founding of the SPD by August Bebel. Brandt was the SPD candidate for the chancellorship in 1961, but he lost to Konrad Adenauer's conservative Christian Democratic Union of Germany (CDU). In 1965, Brandt ran again, but lost to the popular Ludwig Erhard. Erhard's government was short-lived, however, and in 1966 a grand coalition between the SPD and CDU was formed, with Brandt serving as foreign minister and as the 5th Vice Chancellor of Germany.

== Chancellor ==
In the 1969 elections, again with Brandt as the leading candidate, the SPD became stronger. After three weeks of negotiations, the SPD and the smaller Free Democratic Party of Germany (FDP) formed a coalition government. Their Members of the Bundestag elected Brandt Chancellor of Germany.

=== Foreign policy ===
As chancellor, Brandt developed his (Neue) Ostpolitik ("new eastern policy") by stages. He was active in creating a degree of rapprochement with East Germany (governed by a regime under Erich Honecker), and also in improving relations with the Soviet Union, Poland (Polish People's Republic), Czechoslovakia, and other Eastern Bloc (communist) countries.

Brandt introduced his Ostpolitik gradually, starting in 1967 with the establishment of diplomatic relations with Romania and making a trade agreement with Czechoslovakia. In 1968, he restored diplomatic relations with Yugoslavia.

However, in August 1968, the Kremlin-controlled invasion of Czechoslovakia by Warsaw Pact troops ended the Prague Spring. It was a profound disappointment for Brandt. He condemned the invasion and put Ostpolitik on hold while he negotiated a coalition with the Free Democrats. In late 1969, he indicated his readiness to meet with East German leadership (then under Walter Ulbricht) on the basis of equality, without preconditions. He also expressed an eagerness to meet with the USSR and Poland to resolve frontier questions that had remained unsettled since 1945. Brandt and the East German premier Willi Stoph met in Erfurt on 19 March 1970 (Erfurter Gipfeltreffen) and in Kassel on 21 May 1970 (Gipfeltreffen in Kassel).

Brandt made a six-point proposal that would involve two separate German states that respected each other's territorial integrity and settle disputes peacefully. They would cooperate as neighbours and the rights of the Four Powers in Berlin would be respected by both of them, and finally, the situation around Berlin would be improved. No agreements were reached at first, but talks continued.

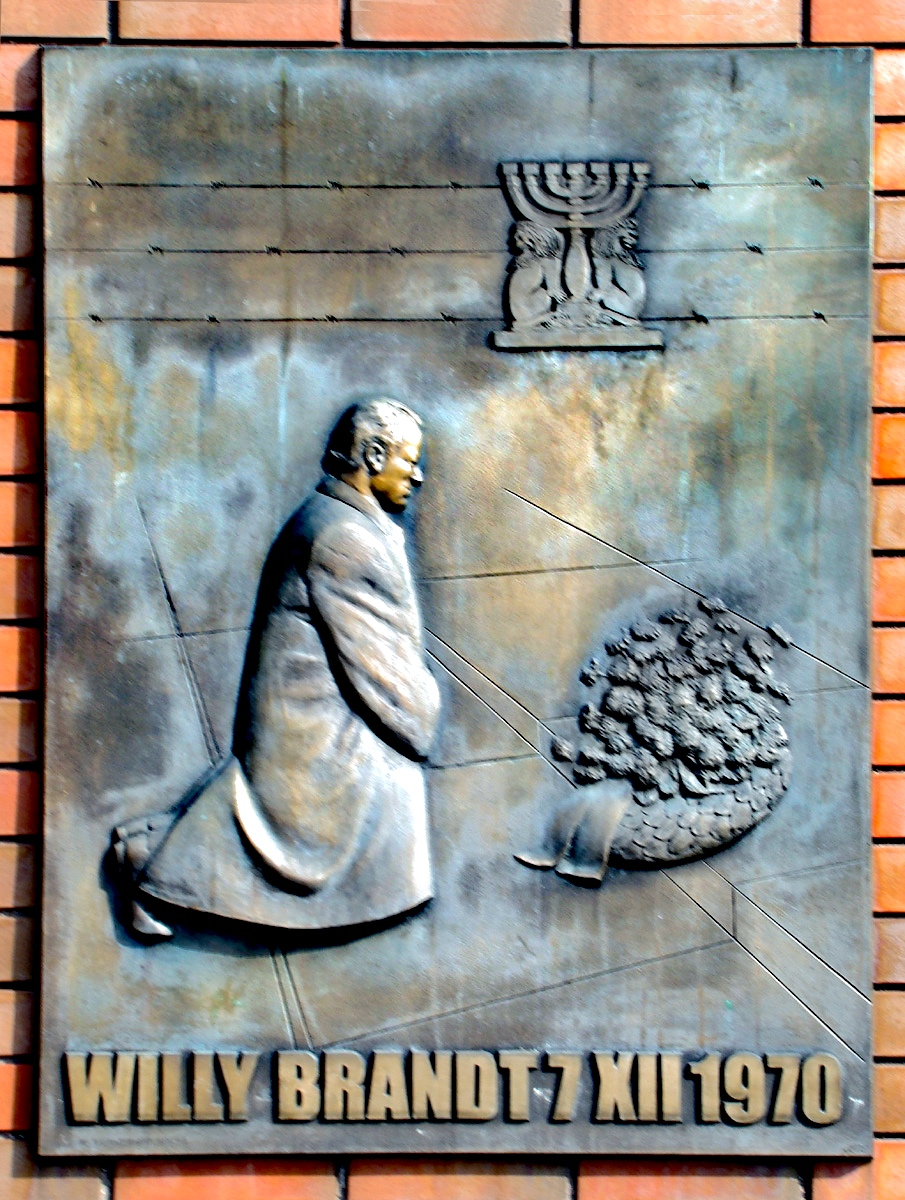
Monument commemorating the Kniefall von Warschau

On 12 August 1970, he signed a treaty with the Soviet Union (Treaty of Moscow, which recognised existing national boundaries and was supposed to normalise relations.) The treaty with Poland in December 1970 (Treaty of Warsaw) accepted the current boundaries (Oder–Neisse line), which had long been in dispute. During a visit to a monument to the German occupation-era Warsaw Ghetto Uprising, he unexpectedly, and apparently spontaneously, knelt (Kniefall von Warschau), honouring the victims.

This was met with a strong positive reaction worldwide but was highly controversial among the German public at the time.

The Berlin question (Berlin-Frage) was settled on 3 September 1971 (Four Power Agreement on Berlin) to West Germany's satisfaction. The crowning step came with the Basic Treaty with East Germany (Basic Treaty, signed 21 December 1972). The status quo was legitimised, relations were formalised based on equality, and both Germanies joined the United Nations in 1973.

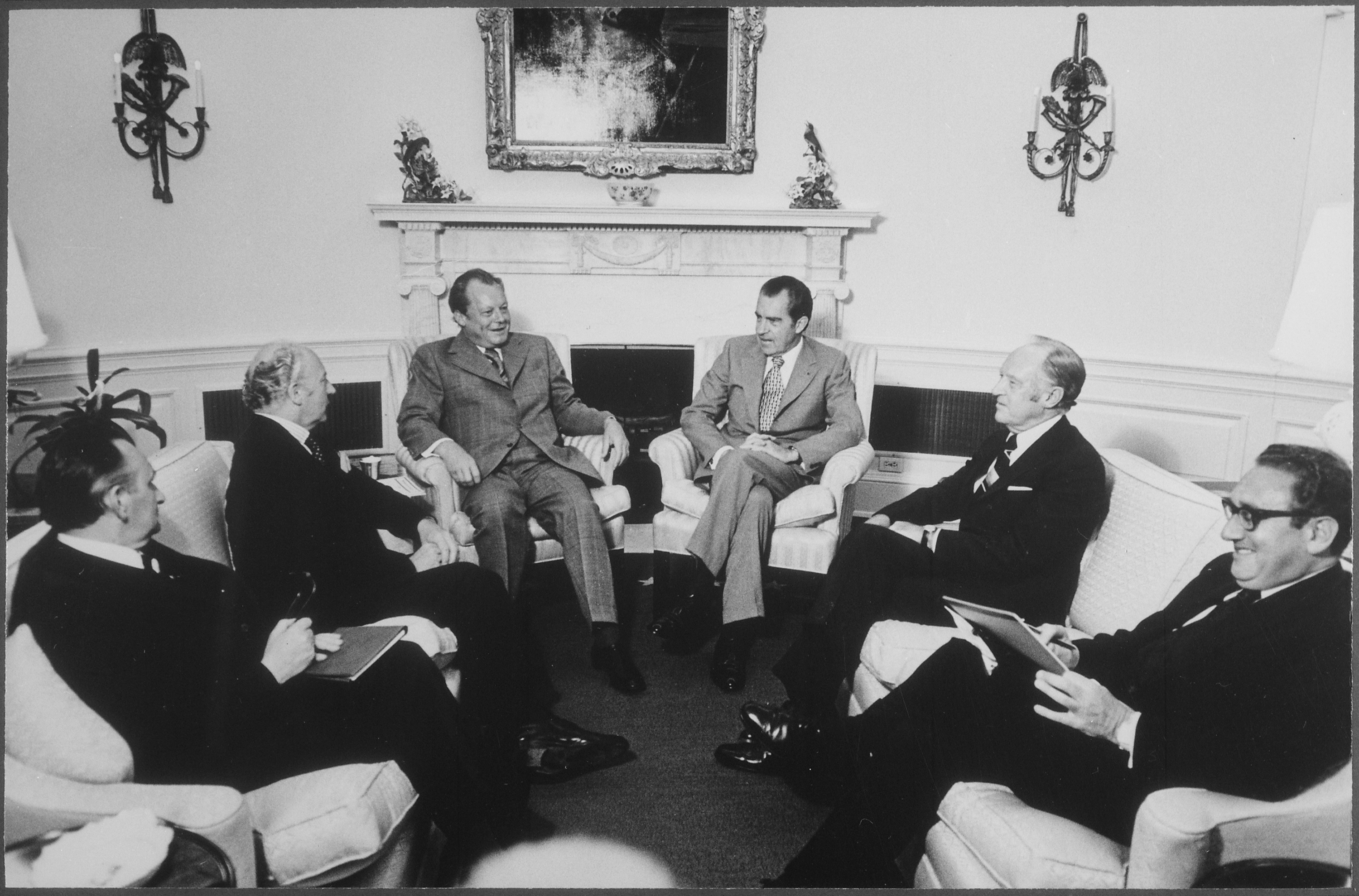
Brandt with U.S. president Richard Nixon and Henry Kissinger, 2 May 1973

Brandt became the first German chancellor to address the United Nations General Assembly. Time magazine in the U.S. named Brandt as its Man of the Year for 1970, stating, "Willy Brandt is in effect seeking to end World War II by bringing about a fresh relationship between East and West. He is trying to accept the real situation in Europe, which has lasted for 25 years, but he is also trying to bring about a new reality in his bold approach to the Soviet Union and the East Bloc." President Richard Nixon also was pushing détente on behalf of the United States. The Nixon policies amounted to co-opting Brandt's Ostpolitik.

In 1971, Brandt received the Nobel Peace Prize for his work in improving International relations with East Germany, Poland, and the Soviet Union. Brandt negotiated a peace treaty with Poland and agreements on the boundaries between the two countries, signifying the official and long-delayed end of World War II. Brandt negotiated parallel treaties and agreements with Czechoslovakia.

In West Germany, Brandt's Neue Ostpolitik was extremely controversial, dividing the populace into two camps. One camp embraced all of the conservative parties, and most notably those West German residents and their families who had been driven west ("die Heimatvertriebenen") by Stalinist ethnic cleansing from Historical Eastern Germany, especially the part that was given to Poland as a consequence of the end of the war; western Czechoslovakia (the Sudetenland); and the rest of Eastern Europe, such as in Romania. These groups of displaced Germans and their descendants loudly voiced their opposition to Brandt's policy, calling it "illegal" and "high treason".

A different camp supported and encouraged Brandt's Neue Ostpolitik as aiming at "change through rapprochement" (Wandel durch Annäherung), encouraging change through a policy of engagement with the (communist) Eastern Bloc, rather than trying to isolate these countries diplomatically and commercially. Brandt's supporters claim that the policy did help to break down the Eastern Bloc's "siege mentality" and also helped to increase its awareness of the contradictions in its brand of socialism/communism, which – together with other events – eventually led to the downfall of Eastern European communism.

=== Domestic policies ===
==== Brandt's popularity ====
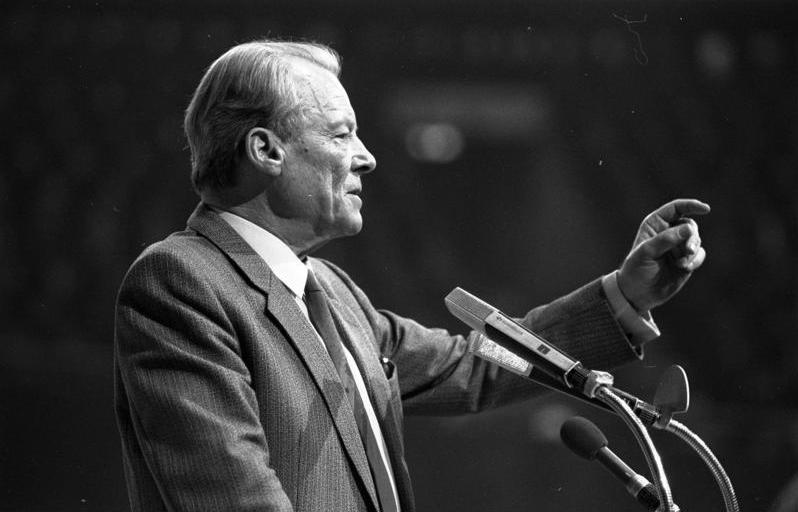
Brandt talking at an SPD meeting in Dortmund, 1983

Brandt's predecessor as chancellor, Kurt Georg Kiesinger (1904–1988), was almost ten years older than Brandt. He had gained his certificate as a lawyer in March 1933 and become a (largely inactive) member of the Nazi party, obviously to avoid professional disadvantages. He was an older-fashioned conservative-liberal intellectual. Brandt, having fought the Nazi regime and having faced down communist Eastern Germany during several crises while he was the mayor of Berlin, became a controversial, but credible, figure in several different factions. As the Minister of Foreign Affairs in Kiesinger's grand coalition cabinet, Brandt helped to gain further international approval for West Germany, and he laid the foundation stones for his future Neue Ostpolitik. There was a wide public-opinion gap between Kiesinger and Brandt in the West German polls.

Both men had come to their own terms with the new baby boomer lifestyles (see also Protests of 1968). Kiesinger considered them to be "a shameful crowd of long-haired drop-outs who needed a bath and someone to discipline them". On the other hand, Brandt needed a while to get into contact with, and to earn credibility among, the "Ausserparlamentarische Opposition" (APO) ("the extra-parliamentary opposition"). The students questioned West German society in general, seeking social, legal, and political reforms. The unrest led to a renaissance of right-wing parties in some of the Bundeslands' (German states under the Bundesrepublik) Parliaments.

Brandt, however, represented a figure of change, and he followed a course of social, legal, and political reforms. The West German federal election on 28 September 1969 brought the SPD 224 seats and FDP 30 seats. 249 seats were needed for a majority. SPD and FDP formed a coalition. In his first speech before the Bundestag as the chancellor, Brandt set forth his political course of reforms, ending the speech with his famous words, "Wir wollen mehr Demokratie wagen" (literally: "We want to dare more democracy", or more figuratively, "We want to take a chance on more Democracy"). This speech made Brandt, as well as the Social Democratic Party, popular among most of the students and other young West German baby-boomers who dreamed of a country that would be more open and more colourful than the frugal and still somewhat-authoritarian Bundesrepublik that had been built after World War II. However, Brandt's Neue Ostpolitik lost him a large part of the German refugee voters from East Germany, who had been significantly pro-SPD in the postwar years.

=== Chancellor of domestic reform ===
Although Brandt is perhaps best known for his achievements in foreign policy, his government oversaw the implementation of a broad range of social reforms, and was known as a "Kanzler der inneren Reformen" ("Chancellor of domestic reform"). According to the historian David Childs, "Brandt was anxious that his government should be a reforming administration and a number of reforms were embarked upon". Within a few years, the education budget rose from 16 billion to 50 billion DM, while one out of every three DM spent by the new government was devoted to welfare purposes. As noted by the journalist and historian Marion Dönhoff, "People were seized by a completely new feeling about life". A mania for large-scale reforms spread like wildfire, affecting schools, universities, the administration, and family legislation. In the autumn of 1970, Hans-Jürgen Wischnewski of the SPD declared "Every week more than three plans for reform come up for decision in cabinet and in the Assembly".

Federal spending rose significantly under Brandt; increasing by an average of 12% per year between 1970 and 1974, with most of the additional spending allocated to transport, education and welfare. During Brandt's time in office, social expenditure rose from one quarter to a third of GDP.

According to Helmut Schmidt, Willy Brandt's domestic reform programme had accomplished more than any previous programme for a comparable period. Levels of social expenditure were increased, with more funds allocated towards housing, transportation, schools, and communication, and substantial federal benefits were provided for farmers. Various measures were introduced to extend health care coverage, while federal aid to sports organisations was increased. A number of social reforms were instituted whilst the welfare state was significantly expanded (with total public spending on social programs nearly doubling between 1969 and 1975), with health, housing, and social welfare legislation bringing about welcome improvements, and by the end of the Brandt Chancellorship West Germany had one of the most advanced systems of welfare in the world.

Substantial increases were made in social security benefits such as injury and sickness benefits, pensions, unemployment benefits, housing allowances, basic subsistence aid allowances, and family allowances and living allowances. In the government's first budget, sickness benefits were increased by 9.3%, pensions for war widows by 25%, pensions for the war wounded by 16%, and retirement pensions by 5%. Numerically, pensions went up by 6.4% (1970), 5.5% (1971), 9.5% (1972), 11.4% (1973), and 11.2% (1974). Adjusted for changes in the annual price index, pensions went up in real terms by 3.1% (1970), 0.3% (1971), 3.9% (1972), 4.4% (1973), and 4.2% (1974). Between 1972 and 1974, the purchasing power of pensioners went up by 19%. In 1970, war pensions were increased by 16%. War victim's pensions went up by 5.5% in January 1971, and by 6.3% in January 1972. By 1972, war pensions for orphans and parents had gone up by around 40%, and for widows by around 50%. Between 1970 and 1972, the "Landabgaberente" (land transfer pension) went up by 55%. Between 1969 and 1974, the average real standard rate of income support rose (in 1991 prices) from around 300 DM to around 400 DM. Between 1970 and 1974, unemployment benefits rose from around 300 euros to around 400 euros per month, and unemployment assistance from just under 200 euros per month to just under 400 euros per month. In 2001 prices, the average standard social assistance benefit level rose from around 200 euros per month in 1969 to over 250 euros per month in 1974. During most of Brandt's years as chancellor, the majority of benefits increased as a percentage of average net earnings.

In 1970, seagoing pilots became retrospectively insurable and gained full social security as members of the Non-Manual Workers Insurance Institute. That same year, a special regulation came into force for District Master Chimney Sweeps, making them fully insurable under the Craftsman's Insurance Scheme. An increase was made in tax-free allowances for children, which enabled 1,000,000 families to claim an allowance for the second child, compared to 300,000 families previously. The Second Modification and Supplementation Law (1970) increased the allowance for the third child from DM 50 to DM 60, raised the income-limit for the second child allowance from DM 7,800 to DM 13,200; subsequently increased to DM 15,000 by the third modification law (December 1971), DM 16,800 by the fourth modification law (November 1973), and to DM 18,360 by the fifth modification law (December 1973). A flexible retirement age after 62 years was introduced (1972) for invalids and disabled persons, and social assistance was extended to those who previously had to be helped by their relatives. From 1971, special subventions were provided to enable young farmers to quit farming "and facilitate their entry into the non-agricultural pension system by means of back payments".

==== Social assistance ====
The Third Modification Law (1974) extended individual entitlements to social assistance by means of higher-income limits compatible with the receipt of benefits and lowered age limits for certain special benefits. Rehabilitation measures were also extended, child supplements were expressed as percentages of standard amounts and were thus indexed to their changes, and the grandparents of recipients were exempted from potential liability to reimburse the expenditure of the social assistance carrier. The Third Social Welfare Amendment Act (1974) brought considerable improvements for the disabled, those in need of care, and older persons, and a new fund of 100 million marks for disabled children was established.

Allowances for retraining and advanced training and for refugees from East Germany were also increased, together with federal grants for sport. In addition, increases were made in the pensions of 2.5 million war victims. Following a sudden increase in the price of oil, a law was passed in December 1973 granting recipients of social assistance and housing allowances a single heating-oil allowance (a procedure repeated in the winter of 1979 during the Schmidt Administration). Improvements and automatic adjustments of maintenance allowances for participants in vocational training measures were also carried out, and increased allowances were provided for training and retraining, together with special allowances for refugees from East Germany.

There was determined, by statutory regulation issued in February 1970, the category of persons most seriously disabled "to whom, with regard to maintenance aid, an increased demand (50% of the appropriate rate) is being conceded, and, within the scope of relief in special living conditions: a higher rate of nursing aid". In 1971, the retirement age for miners was lowered to 50. An April 1972 law providing for "promotion of social aid services" aimed to remedy, through various beneficial measures (particularly in the field of national insurance and working conditions), the staff-shortage suffered by social establishments in their medico-social, educational and other work. A bill to harmonise re-education benefits and another bill relating to severely disabled persons became law in May and September 1972 respectively. In 1972, winter payments for construction workers were introduced.

To assist family planning and marriage and family guidance, the government allocated DM 2,232,000 in 1973 for the payment and for the basic and further training of staff. A special effort was also made in 1973 to organise the recreation of disabled persons, with a holiday guide for the disabled issued with the aid of the Federal Ministry of Family and Youth Affairs and Health in order to help them find suitable holiday accommodation for themselves and their families. From 1972 to 1973, the total amount of individual aids granted by the Guarantee Fund for the integration of young immigrants increased from 17 million DM to 26 million DM. Under a law passed in April 1974, the protection hitherto granted to the victims of war or industrial accidents for the purpose of their occupational and social reintegration was extended to all disabled persons, whatever the cause of their disability, provided that their capacity to work had been reduced by at least 50%.

==== Health care ====
In the field of health care, various measures were introduced to improve the quality and availability of health care provision. Free hospital care was introduced for 9 million recipients of social relief, while a contributory medical service for 23 million panel patients was introduced. Pensioners were exempted from paying a 2% health insurance contribution, while improvements in health insurance provision were carried out, as characterised by an expanded sickness insurance scheme, with the inclusion of preventative treatment. The income limit for compulsory sickness insurance was indexed to changes in the wage level (1970), and the right to medical cancer screening for 23.5 million people was introduced. In January 1971, the reduction of sickness allowance in case of hospitalisation was discontinued. That same year, compulsory health insurance was extended to the self-employed. In 1970, the government included nonmedical psychotherapists and psychoanalysts in the national health insurance program.

Pupils, students and children in kindergartens were incorporated into the accident insurance scheme, which benefited 11 million children. Free medical checkups were introduced that same year, while the Farmers' Sickness Insurance Law (1972) introduced compulsory sickness insurance for independent farmers, family workers in agriculture, and pensioners under the farmers' pension scheme, medical benefits for all covered groups, and cash benefits for family workers under compulsory coverage for pension insurance. Participation in the employer's health insurance was extended to four million employees. A Development Law of December 1970 made it possible for all employees to voluntarily become members of the statutory sickness insurance. The level of income for compulsory sickness insurance was indexed to 75% of the respective assessment level for pension insurance, while voluntarily insured employees were granted a claim to an allowance towards their sickness insurance from their employer. This law also introduced a new type of sickness insurance benefit, namely facilities for the early diagnosis of disease. Apart from the discretionary service of disease prevention, which had existed since 1923, insured persons now had a right in certain circumstances to medical examinations aimed at the early diagnosis of disease. According to one study, this marked a change in the concept of sickness insurance: it now aimed at securing good health.

The Hospital Financing Law (1972) secured the supply of hospitals and reduced the cost of hospital care, "defined the financing of hospital investment as a public responsibility, single states to issue plans for hospital development, and the federal government to bear the cost of hospital investment covered in the plans, rates for hospital care thus based on running costs alone, hospitals to ensure that public subsidies together with insurance fund payments for patients cover total costs". The Benefit Improvement Law (1973) made entitlement to hospital care legally binding (entitlements already enjoyed in practice), abolished time limits for hospital care, introduced entitlement to household assistance under specific conditions, and also introduced entitlement to leave of absence from work and cash benefits in the event of a child's illness. In 1971, to encourage the growth of registered family holiday centres, the Federal Government granted subsidies for the building and appointing of 28 of these centres at a total cost of 8 million DM. Free preliminary investigations were introduced for 2.5 million children up until the age of 4 for the early detection and correction of developmental disorders, and health research was expanded. Federal grants were increased, especially for the Cancer Research Centre in Heidelberg, while a Federal Institute for Sport Science was set up, together with the Institute for Social Medicine and Epidemiology in Berlin. In addition, funding for new rehabilitation facilities was increased.

==== Retirement ====
The Pension Reform Law (1972) guaranteed all retirees a minimum pension regardless of their contributions and institutionalized the norm that the standard pension (of average earners with forty years of contributions) should not fall below 50% of current gross earnings. The 1972 pension reforms improved eligibility conditions and benefits for nearly every subgroup of the West German population. The income replacement rate for employees who made full contributions was raised to 70% of average earnings. The reform also replaced 65 as the mandatory retirement age with a "retirement window" ranging between 63 and 65 for employees who had worked for at least thirty-five years. Employees who qualified as disabled and had worked for at least thirty-five years were extended a more generous retirement window, which ranged between the ages of 60 and 62. Women who had worked for at least fifteen years (ten of which had to be after the age of 40) and the long-term unemployed were also granted the same retirement window as the disabled. In addition, there were no benefit reductions for employees who had decided to retire earlier than the age of 65. The legislation also changed the way in which pensions were calculated for low-income earners who had been covered for twenty-five or more years. If the pension benefit fell below a specified level, then such workers were allowed to substitute a wage figure of 75% of the average wage during this period, thus creating something like a minimum wage benefit. According to one study, the 1972 pension reform "enhanced" the reduction of poverty in old age.

Voluntary retirement at 63 with no deductions in the level of benefits was introduced, together with the index-linking of war victims' pensions to wage increases. Guaranteed minimum pension benefits for all West Germans were introduced, along with automatic pension increases for war widows (1970). Fixed minimum rates for women in receipt of very low pensions were also introduced, together with equal treatment for war widows. Improvements in pension provision were made for women and the self-employed, a new minimum pension for workers with at least twenty-five years' insurance was introduced, faster pension indexation was implemented, with the annual adjustment of pensions brought forward by six months, and the Seventh Modification Law (1973) linked the indexation of farmers' pensions to the indexation of the general pension insurance scheme.

A new pension for "severely handicapped" persons was introduced in 1972, along with occupational injury annuities and a special pension for long-standing insurant from the age of 63 and a pension due to "limited earning capacity" from the age of 62. In addition, a special pension benefit was introduced for workers aged 60 and above after unemployment. Under the Severely Handicapped Persons Act of April 1974, a seriously disabled person could retire early on an old age pension at the age of 62 years, provided that he "complied with the other provisions of the legislation on pension insurance".

==== Education ====
In education, the Brandt Administration sought to widen educational opportunities for all West Germans. The government presided over an increase in the number of teachers, generous public stipends were introduced for students to cover their living costs, and West German universities were converted from elite schools into mass institutions. The school leaving age was raised to 16, and spending on research and education was increased by nearly 300% between 1970 and 1974. Working through a planning committee set up for the "joint task" of university development, the Federal Government started to make investment costs in 1971. Fees for higher or further education were abolished, while a considerable increase in the number of higher education institutions took place. A much-needed school and college construction program was carried out, together with the introduction of postgraduate support for highly qualified graduates, providing them with the opportunity to earn their doctorates or undertake research studies. A law on individual promotion of vocational training came into force in October 1971, which provided for financial grants for attendance at further general or technical teaching establishments from the second year of studies at higher technical schools, academies and higher education establishments, training centres of second degree, or certain courses of television teaching. Grants were also made in certain cases for attendance at training centres located outside the Federal Republic.

The education budget was doubled from 3% to 6%, while an expansion of secondary education took place. The number of university students went up from 100,000 to 650,000, 30,000 more places were created in the schools, and an additional 1 billion marks were allocated for new school buildings. In addition, the provision of scholarships was expanded, with the 1970 programme providing for, in the words of one observer, "5,000 new scholarships for graduates, and double that number were being awarded three years later". Grants were introduced for pupils from lower income groups to stay on at school, together with grants for those going into any kind of higher or further education. Increases were also made in educational allowances, as well as spending on science. In 1972, the government allocated 2.1 million DM in grants to promote marriage and family education. Under the Approbationsordnung (medical education profession act) of 1970, the subject of psychosomatic medicine and psychotherapy at German universities became a compulsory subject for medical students, and that same year education of clinical and biomedical engineers was introduced. The Brandt Administration also introduced enabling legislation for the introduction of comprehensives, but left it to the Lander "to introduce them at their discretion". While the more left-wing Lander "rapidly began to do so", other Lander found "all sorts of pretexts for delaying the scheme". By the mid-1980s, Berlin had 25 comprehensives while Bavaria only had 1, and in most Länder comprehensives were still viewed as "merely experimental".

==== Housing and urban development ====
In the field of housing, various measures were carried out to benefit householders, such as improving the rights of tenants and increasing rental assistance. According to the Rent Subsidies Act (Wohngeldgesetz) of 1970, "low-income tenants and owners of accommodations are supported with rents and burdens subsidies". The determination of the income of families taken into consideration for housing allowances was simplified, and increased levels of protection and support for low-income tenants and householders were introduced, which led to a drop in the number of eviction notices. By 1974, three times as much was paid out in rent subsidies as in 1969, and nearly one and a half million households received rental assistance. Increases were made in public housing subsidies, as characterised by a 36% increase in the social housing budget in 1970 and by the introduction of a programme for the construction of 200,000 public housing units (1971). From 1970 to 1971, an 18.1% increase in building permits for social housing units was made. Other reforms aimed at improving tenants' rights included protection against conversion of rental housing into condominiums, the prohibition of the misappropriation of living space, new regulation of the apartment broker system, and a fee scale for engineers and architects. In addition, the income limits for eligibility for social housing were raised and adapted in order to reflect general income trends.

A loose form of rent regulation was introduced under the name of Vergleichmieten (comparable rents), together with the provision of "for family-friendly housing" freight or rent subsidies to owners of apartments or houses whose ceiling had been adapted to increased expenses or incomes (1970). In addition, a law for the creation of property for workers was passed, under which a married worker would normally keep up to 95% of his pay, and graded tax remission for married wage-earners applied up to a wage of 48,000 marks, which indicated the economic prosperity of West Germany at that time. The Town Planning Act (1971) encouraged the preservation of historical heritage and helped open up the way to the future of many German cities, while the Urban Renewal Act (1971) helped the states to restore their inner cities and to develop new neighbourhoods. In addition, the Guidelines of December 1972 on the usage of federal funds in assisting social housing construction laid down that a certain standard needed to be observed when building homes for severely disabled persons.

The Second Housing Allowance Law of December 1970 simplified the administration of housing allowances and extended entitlements, increased the income limit to 9,600 DM per year plus 2,400 DM for each family member, raised the general deduction on income to determine reckonable income from 15% to 20%, allowance rates listed in tables replacing complicated calculation procedure based on "bearable rent burdens". The Housing Construction Modification Law (1971) increased the income-limit for access to low rent apartments under the social housing programme from 9,000 DM to 12,000 DM per annum plus 3,000 DM (instead of 2,400) for each family member. The law also introduced special subsidies to reduce the debt burden for builders not surpassing the regular income limit by more than 40%. Under a 1973 law, the limits were increased to 1,000 DM plus 9,000 DM and 4,200 DM for additional family members. The Rent Improvement Law (1971) strengthened the position of tenants. Under this legislation, notice was to be ruled illegal "where appropriate substitute accommodation not available; landlords obliged to specify reasons for notice", whilst the Eviction Protection Law (1971) established tenant protection against rent rises and notice. The notice was only lawful if in the "justified interest of the landlord". Under this law, higher rents were not recognised as "justified interest". The Second Eviction Protection Law (1972) made the tenant protection introduced under the Eviction Protection Law of 1971 permanent. Under this new law, the notice was only lawful where the landlord proved a justified personal interest in the apartment. In addition, rent increases were only lawful if they were not above normal comparable rents in the same area.

Directives on the housing of foreign workers came into force in April 1971. These directives imposed certain requirements for space, hygiene, safety, and amenities in the accommodations offered by employers. That same year, the Federal Government granted a sum of 17 million DM to the Länder for the improvement and modernisation of housing built before 21 June 1948. In addition, according to a 1971 regulation of the Board of the Federal Labour Office, "construction of workers' hostels qualified for government financial support under certain conditions". The "German Council for town development", which was set up by virtue of Article 89 of a law to foster urban building, was partly aimed at planning a favourable environment for families (such as the provision of playgrounds). In 1971, the Federal Labour Office made available DM 425 million in the form of loans to provide 157,293 beds in 2,494 hostels. A year later, the Federal Government (Bund), the Länder and the Federal Labour Office promoted the construction of dwellings for migrant workers. They set aside 10 million DM for this purpose, which allowed the financing of 1650 family dwellings that year.

Development measures were begun in 1972 with federal financial aid granted to the Lander for improvement measures relating to towns and villages, and in the 1972 budget, DM 50 million was earmarked, i.e. a third of the total cost of some 300 schemes. A council for urban development was formed in May 1972 with the purpose of promoting future work and measures in the field of urban renovation. In 1973, the government provided assistance of DM 28 million for the modernisation of old dwellings. New rules were introduced regarding improvements in the law relating to rented property, and control of the rise in rents and protection against cancellation of leases also safeguarded the rights of migrant workers in the sphere of housing. A law of July 1973 fixed the fundamental and minimum requirements regarding workers' dwellings, mainly concerning space, ventilation and lighting, protection against damp, heat and noise, power and heating facilities and sanitary installations.

==== Civil, family, and animal rights ====
Regarding civil rights, the Brandt Administration introduced a broad range of socially liberal reforms aimed at making West Germany a more open society. Greater legal rights for women were introduced, as exemplified by the standardisation of pensions, divorce laws, regulations governing the use of surnames, and the introduction of measures to bring more women into politics. The voting age was lowered from 21 to 18, the age of eligibility for political office was lowered to 21, and the age of majority was lowered to 18 in March 1974. The Third Law for the Liberalisation of the Penal Code (1970) liberalised "the right to political demonstration", while equal rights were granted to illegitimate children that same year. A 1971 amendment to a federal civil service reform bill enabled fathers to apply for part-time civil service work. In 1971, corporal punishment was banned in schools, and that same year a new Highway Code was introduced. In 1973, a measure was introduced that facilitated the adoption of young children by reducing the minimum age for adoptive parents from 35 to 25.

A woman's policy machinery at the national level was established in 1972 while amnesty was guaranteed for minor offences connected with demonstrations. From 1970 onwards, parents as well as landlords were no longer legally prohibited "to give or rent rooms or flats to unmarried couples or to allow them to stay overnight". In October 1972, the legal aid system was improved with the compensation paid to private lawyers for legal services to the poor increased. The Bausparkassen Act of 1972 placed all bausparkassen (building societies) under the supervision of the Federal Banking Supervisory Office from January 1974 onwards, and confined them "to the contract saving business and related activities". The Animal Protection Act, passed in 1972, introduced various safeguards for animals such as not permitting the causing of pain, injury, or suffering to an animal without justification, and limiting experiments to the minimum number of animals necessary. In 1971, rules were introduced making it possible for former guestworkers "to receive an unlimited residence permit after a five-year stay".

==== Military ====
A number of reforms were also carried out to the armed forces, as characterised by a reduction in basic military training from 18 to 15 months, a reorganisation of education and training, and personnel and procurement procedures. Education for the troops was improved, a personnel reshuffle of top management in the Bundeswehr was carried out, academic education was mandated for officers beyond their basic military training, and a new recruiting policy for Bundeswehr personnel was introduced with the intention of building an army that reflected West Germany's pluralistic society. Defence Minister Helmut Schmidt led the development of the first Joint Service Regulation ZDv 10/1 (Assistance for Innere Fuehrung, classified: restricted), which revitalised the concept of Innere Fuehrung while also affirming the value of the "citizen in uniform". According to one study, as a result of this reform, "a strong civil mindset displaced the formerly dominant military mindset", and forced the Bundeswehr's elder generation to accept a new type of soldier envisioned by Schmidt. In addition, the Federal Cost of Moving Act increased the relocation allowance (with effect from 1 November 1973), with the basic allowances raised by DM 50 and DM 100 respectively, while extra allowances for families were raised to a uniform amount of 125 DM.

In 1970, the Armed Forces Vocational Schools and the Vocational Advancement Organization extended their services for the first time to conscripts, "so far as military duty permitted". New enlistment bonuses were authorised and previous bonus schemes were improved, and new pay regulations were introduced that improved the financial situation of military personnel and civil servants. In July 1973, the 3rd Amendment to the Civilian Service Act came into force; "a prerequisite for the creation of additional civilian service places for recognised conscientious objectors". The amendment provided that men recognised as conscientious objectors while performing military service should immediately be transferred to a civilian service assignment. The maximum amount for servicemen enlisting for at least 12 years was increased from DM 6,000 to DM 9,000, and from October 1971 onwards, long-term personnel were paid grants towards the cost of attending educational institutes of the "second educational route" or participating in state-recognized general education courses provided by private correspondence schools and the "television college". In 1972, two Bundeswehr universities were established; a reform which, according to one historian, "fought against the closed nature of the military and guaranteed that officers would be better able to successfully interact with the civilian world". From April 1973, the general maintenance payments under the Law amending the Maintenance Security Act and the Workplace Protection Act were increased, while increases were also made in the special allowance (Christmas bonus) for conscripts, together with the dismissal allowance. The expense allowance for troops on duty-related absence from place of employment was improved, together with travel subsidies and provisions for military service-damaged soldiers and their families. In addition, the position of non-commissioned officers was improved.

==== Consumers' and workers' rights ====
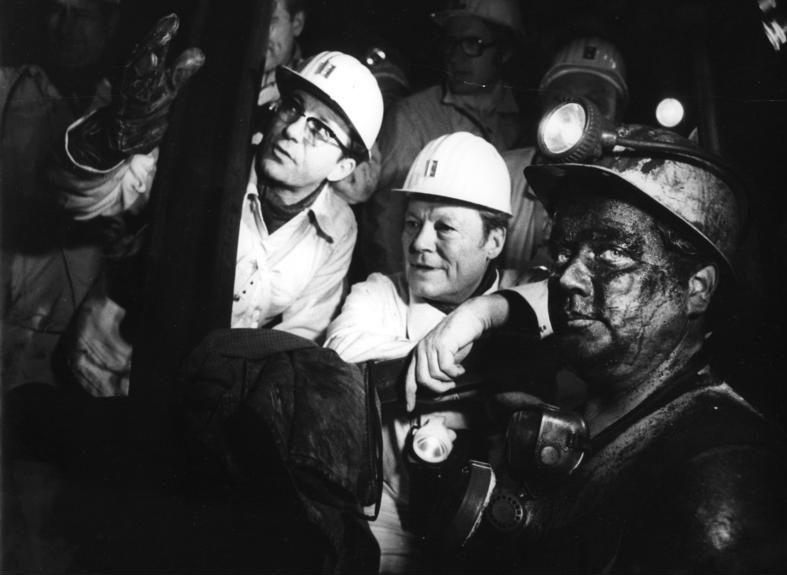
Brandt visiting a coal mine in Dortmund-Eving, 1974

Legislation aimed at safeguarding consumers was also implemented under the Brandt Administration. The consumer's right of withdrawal in case of hire purchase was strengthened in March 1974, and fixed prices for branded products were abolished by law in January that same year, which meant that manufacturers' recommended prices were not binding for retailers. In addition, a progressive anticartel law was passed. The Law on Compensation for Measures of Criminal Prosecution and Penalties, passed in March 1971, provided for standardised compensation in certain situations. In addition, the budget for communications was increased.

In terms of working conditions, a number of reforms were introduced aimed at strengthening the rights of workers both at home and in the workplace. The Sickness Act of 1970 provided equal treatment of workers and employees in the event of incapacity for work, while maternity leave was increased. Legislation was introduced in 1970, which ensured continued payment of wages for workers disabled by illness. In 1970 all employees unfit for work (except for women in receipt of maternity benefits and temporarily and inconsiderably employed persons) were provided with an unconditional legal claim against their employer to continued payment of their gross wage for a period of 6 weeks, as also in the case of spa treatment approved by an Insurance Fund, the Fund bearing the full cost thereof. Previously, payment of the employer's supplement and sick pay were only made from the day on which the doctor certified unfitness for work. In 1972, an Act on Agency Work was passed, which sought to prevent work agencies from providing job placement services and aimed to provide minimum job protection for employees in agency work. A law on the hiring out of manpower, passed in October 1972, contained provisions to stipulate prior authorization for the hiring out of manpower, to draw a distinction between the system governing workers hired out and the placing of workers, to regulate and improve the rights of hired out workers pertaining to working conditions and social insurance, and provide for more severe penalties and fines to be imposed on offenders.

Improvements were also made in income and work conditions for home workers, accident insurance was extended to non-working adults, and the Border Zone Assistance Act (1971) increased levels of assistance to the declining zonal peripheral area. The Occupational Safety Act (1973) required employers to provide company doctors and safety experts. A directive on protection against noise at the place of work was adopted in November 1970. If measurements showed or there was reason to assume that a noise level guide value of 90 dB(A) may be exceeded at the place of work, then the authority had to instruct the employer to arrange check-ups of the employees concerned, and these employees had to use personal noise protection devices. A matching fund program for 15 million employees was also introduced, which stimulated them to accumulate capital.

A ministerial order of January 1970 extended protection in cases of partial unemployment to home workers, while an ordinance of August 1970 fixed the conditions of health necessary for service in the merchant navy. A general provision of October 1970 determined in detail the circumstances in which the competent authority must take action based on the act on the technical means of work. The requirement also stipulated the extent to which the technical standards established by national and international organisations can be regarded as "rules of the art".

By a decree of the Federal Minister for Labour and Social Order, the Federal Institute for Industrial Protection became the Federal Agency for Industrial Protection and Accident Research. Amongst its designated tasks were the promotion of industrial protection, accident prevention on the journey to and from work and accident prevention in the home and leisure activities, the encouragement of training and advanced training in the area of industrial protection, and the promotion and coordination of accident research. A regulation was issued in 1972 which permitted for the first time the employment of women as drivers of trams, omnibuses and lorries, while further regulations laid down new provisions for lifts and work with compressed air. The Factory Constitution Law (1971) strengthened the rights of individual employees "to be informed and to be heard on matters concerning their place of work". The Works Council was provided with greater authority while trade unions were given the right of entry into the factory "provided they informed the employer of their intention to do so", while a law was passed to encourage wider share ownership by workers and other rank-and-file employees. The Industrial Relations Law (1972) and the Personnel Representation Act (1974) broadened the rights of employees in matters which immediately affected their places of work, while also improving the possibilities for codetermination on operations committees, together with access of trade unions to companies.

The Works Constitution Act of 1972 required, in cases of collective dismissal at an establishment normally employing more than twenty employees, that management and the works council must negotiate a social plan that stipulates compensation for workers who lose their jobs. In cases where the two parties could not agree on a social plan, the law provided for binding arbitration. In 1972, the rights of works councils to information from management were not only strengthened, but works councils were also provided with full codetermination rights on issues such as working time arrangements in the plant, the setting of piece rates, plant wage systems, the establishment of vacation times, work breaks, overtime, and short-time work. Legislation was passed which acknowledged for the first time the presence of trade unions in the workplace, expanded the means of action of the works councils, and improved their work basics as well as those of the youth councils.

A law of January 1972 on the organisation of labour in enterprises significantly extended the works council's right of cooperation and co-management in the matter of vocational training. That same year, the Safety Institute of the Federal Republic of Germany was transformed into a public Federal Agency (Bundesanstalt) with significantly enlarged powers, in the context of which special emphasis would be placed on its new task of promoting and coordinating research in the area of accident prevention. New provisions were introduced for the rehabilitation of severely disabled people ("Schwerbehinderte") and accident victims. The Severely Disabled Persons Act of April 1974 obliged all employers with more than fifteen employees to ensure that 6% of their workforce consisted of people officially recognised as being severely disabled. Employers who failed to do so were assessed 100 DM per month for every job falling below the required quota. These compensatory payments were used to "subsidise the adaptation of workplaces to the requirements of those who were severely handicapped".

A law passed in January 1974, designed to protect members of the supervisory boards of companies who are undergoing training, was aimed at ensuring that the representatives of young workers and youthful members of works councils still undergoing training could perform their duties with greater independence and without fear of disadvantageous consequences for their future careers. On request, workers' representatives on completion of their training courses had to have an employment relationship of unlimited duration. In the field of transport, the Municipal Transportation Finance Law of 1971 established federal guidelines for subsidies to municipal governments, while the Federal Transport Plan of 1973 provided a framework for all transport, including public transport. In addition, the Severely Handicapped Persons Act of April 1974 extended the welfare and promotional obligations of the employer and provided a right to an extra holiday consisting of six working days.

==== Environment ====
A federal environmental programme was established in 1971, and in 1972 laws were passed to regulate garbage elimination and air pollution via emissions. Matching grants covering 90% of infrastructure development were allocated to local communities, which led to a dramatic increase in the number of public swimming pools and other facilities of consumptive infrastructure throughout West Germany. The federal crime-fighting apparatus was also modernised, while a Foreign Tax Act was passed which limited the possibility of tax evasion. In addition, efforts were made to improve the railways and motorways. In 1971, a law was passed setting the maximum lead content at 0.4 grams per liter of gasoline, and in 1972 DDT was banned. The Federal Emissions Control Law, passed in March 1974, provided protection from noxious gases, noise, and air-borne particulate matter.

In August 1971, a law came into force directed at reducing atmospheric pollution from lead compounds in four-stroke engine fuels. As a safeguard against radiation, a decree on the system of authorisations for medicaments treated with ionising radiation or containing radioactive substances, in its version of 8 August 1967, was remodelled by a new Decree of 10 May 1971 which added some radionuclides to the list of medicaments which doctors in private practice were authorised to use.

Taking into account the enormous high peaks of air traffic noise and its concentration at a limited number of airports, the Law for Protection against Aircraft Noise of 1971 sought to balance two conflicting demands, the first being the legitimate demand by industry, business and the public for an efficient air traffic system, and secondly, the understandable and by no means less legitimate claims of the affected people for protection and compensation. The legislation regulated the establishment of so-called "Lärmschutzzonen" (protection areas against aircraft noise) for all 11 international airports and for those 34 military airports used for jet aircraft, and the law also authorised the Federal Department of the Interior to decree protection areas for each of those mentioned airports with approval by the "Bundesrat", the representation of the German Federal States.

==== Economy ====
Under the Brandt Administration, West Germany attained a lower rate of inflation than in other industrialised countries at that time, while a rise in the standard of living took place, helped by the floating and revaluation of the mark. This was characterised by the real incomes of employees increasing more sharply than incomes from entrepreneurial work, with the proportion of employees' incomes in the overall national income rising from 65% to 70% between 1969 and 1973, while the proportion of income from entrepreneurial work and property fell over that same period from just under 35% to 30%. In addition, the percentage of West Germans living in poverty (based on various definitions) fell between 1969 and 1973. According to one estimate, the percentage of West Germans living in poverty fell from 9.7% to 8.9% between 1969 and 1973, and from 20.2% to 14.0% according to another estimate. According to another estimate, the percentage of West Germans living in poverty during this period fell from 2.7% to 1.4%.

=== 1972 crisis ===
Brandt's Ostpolitik led to a meltdown of the narrow majority Brandt's coalition enjoyed in the Bundestag. In October 1970, FDP deputies Erich Mende, Heinz Starke, and Siegfried Zoglmann crossed the floor to join the CDU. On 23 February 1972, SPD deputy Herbert Hupka, who was also leader of the Bund der Vertriebenen, joined the CDU in disagreement with Brandt's reconciliatory efforts towards the east. On 23 April 1972, Wilhelm Helms (FDP) left the coalition. The FDP politicians Knud von Kühlmann-Stumm and Gerhard Kienbaum also declared that they would vote against Brandt, completing the loss of Brandt's majority. On 24 April 1972, a constructive vote of no confidence was proposed, to be voted on three days later. In the event this motion passed, CDU leader Rainer Barzel would have replaced Brandt as chancellor.

On paper, the opposition now had 250 votes; just one over the 249 needed to oust Brandt. Even Brandt himself believed he was finished, and a number of unions went on strike in anticipation of Brandt's expected defeat on the floor of the Bundestag. To everyone's surprise, the motion failed: Barzel got only 247 votes out of 260 votes cast, two short of what he needed to become Chancellor. There were also 10 votes against the motion and three invalid ballots. Most SPD and FDP deputies abstained, which had the same effect as voting for Brandt.

=== New elections ===
Though Brandt remained chancellor, he had lost his majority. Subsequent initiatives in parliament, most notably on the budget, failed. Because of this stalemate, the Bundestag was dissolved, and new elections were called. During the 1972 campaign, many popular West German artists, intellectuals, writers, actors and professors supported Brandt and the SPD. Among them were Günter Grass, Walter Jens, and even the soccer player Paul Breitner. Brandt's Ostpolitik as well as his reformist domestic policies were popular with parts of the young generation, and he led the SPD to its best-ever federal election result in late 1972.

However, the Willy-Wahl, Brandt's landslide win, was the beginning of the end, and Brandt's role in government started to decline. Many of his reforms met with resistance from state governments, dominated by CDU/CSU. The spirit of reformist optimism was cut short by the 1973 oil crisis and the major public services strike of 1974, which gave Germany's trade unions, led by Heinz Kluncker, a big wage increase but reduced Brandt's financial leeway for further reforms. Brandt was said to be more of a dreamer than a manager and was personally haunted by depression. To counter any notions about being sympathetic to Communism or soft on left-wing extremists, Brandt implemented tough legislation that barred "radicals" from public service (Radikalenerlass).

=== Guillaume affair ===
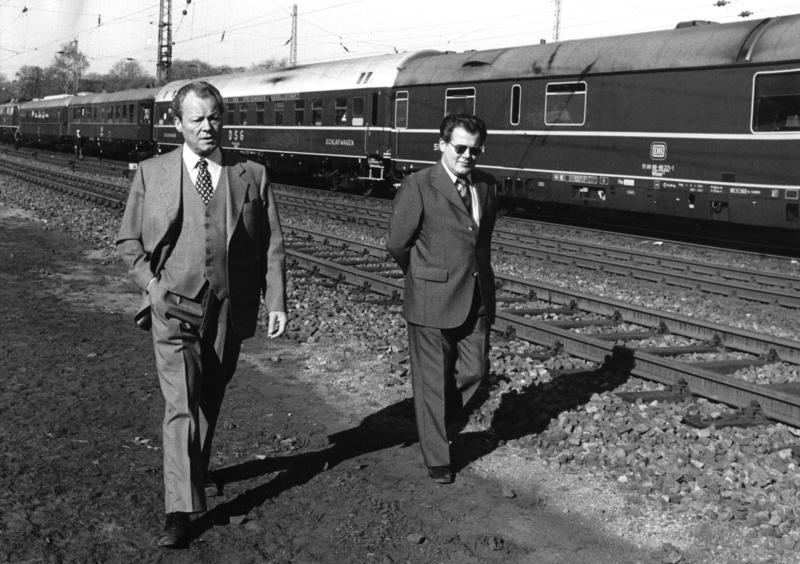
Brandt, photographed in 1974, with Günter Guillaume. This image was taken a month before Brandt's resignation as chancellor.

Around 1973, West German security organisations received information that one of Brandt's personal assistants, Günter Guillaume, was a spy for the East German intelligence services. Brandt was asked to continue working as usual, and he agreed to do so, even taking a private vacation with Guillaume. Guillaume was arrested on 24 April 1974 and later sentenced to 13 years in prison for treason. Brandt resigned from his position as chancellor on 6 May 1974, but he remained a member of the Bundestag and chairman of the Social Democrats until 1987.

This espionage affair is widely considered to have been just the trigger for Brandt's resignation, not the fundamental cause. As Brandt himself later said, "I was exhausted, for reasons which had nothing to do with the affair [the Guillaume espionage scandal] going on at the time." Brandt was dogged by scandals about serial adultery and reportedly also struggled with alcohol and depression. There was also the economic fallout on West Germany of the 1973 oil crisis, which may seem to have given enough stress to finish off Brandt as the Chancellor.

Guillaume had been an espionage agent for East Germany, who was supervised by Markus Wolf, the head of the Main Directorate for Reconnaissance (Hauptverwaltung Aufklärung or HVA—the foreign intelligence service) of the East German Ministry for State Security. Wolf stated after the reunification that the resignation of Brandt had never been intended, and that the planting and handling of Guillaume had been one of the biggest mistakes of the East German secret services.

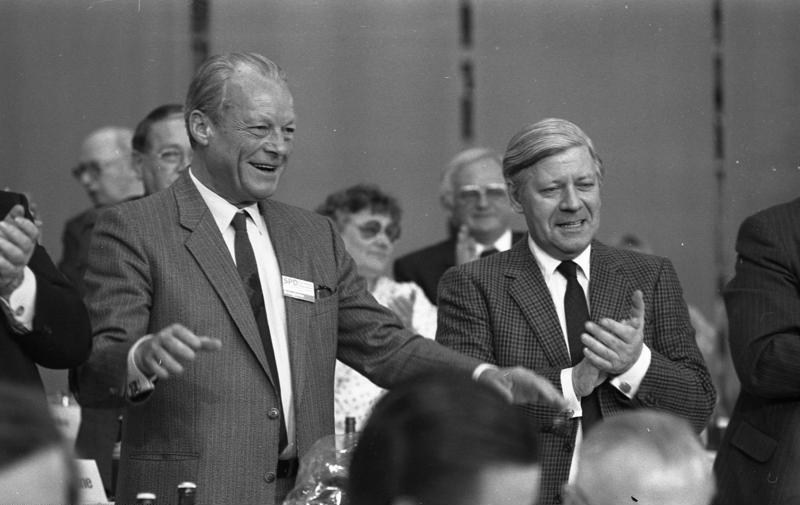
Brandt, photographed at an SPD conference in Munich, with his successor Helmut Schmidt, 1982

Brandt was succeeded as the Chancellor of the Bundesrepublik by his fellow Social Democrat, Helmut Schmidt. For the rest of his life, Brandt remained suspicious that his fellow Social Democrat (and longtime rival) Herbert Wehner had been scheming for Brandt's downfall. However, there is scant evidence to corroborate this suspicion.

== Post-Chancellorship ==
After his term as the Chancellor, Brandt retained his seat in the Bundestag, and he remained the Chairman of the Social Democratic Party through 1987. Beginning in 1987, Brandt stepped down to become the Honorary Chairman of the party. Brandt was also a member of the European Parliament from 1979 to 1983.

=== Socialist International ===
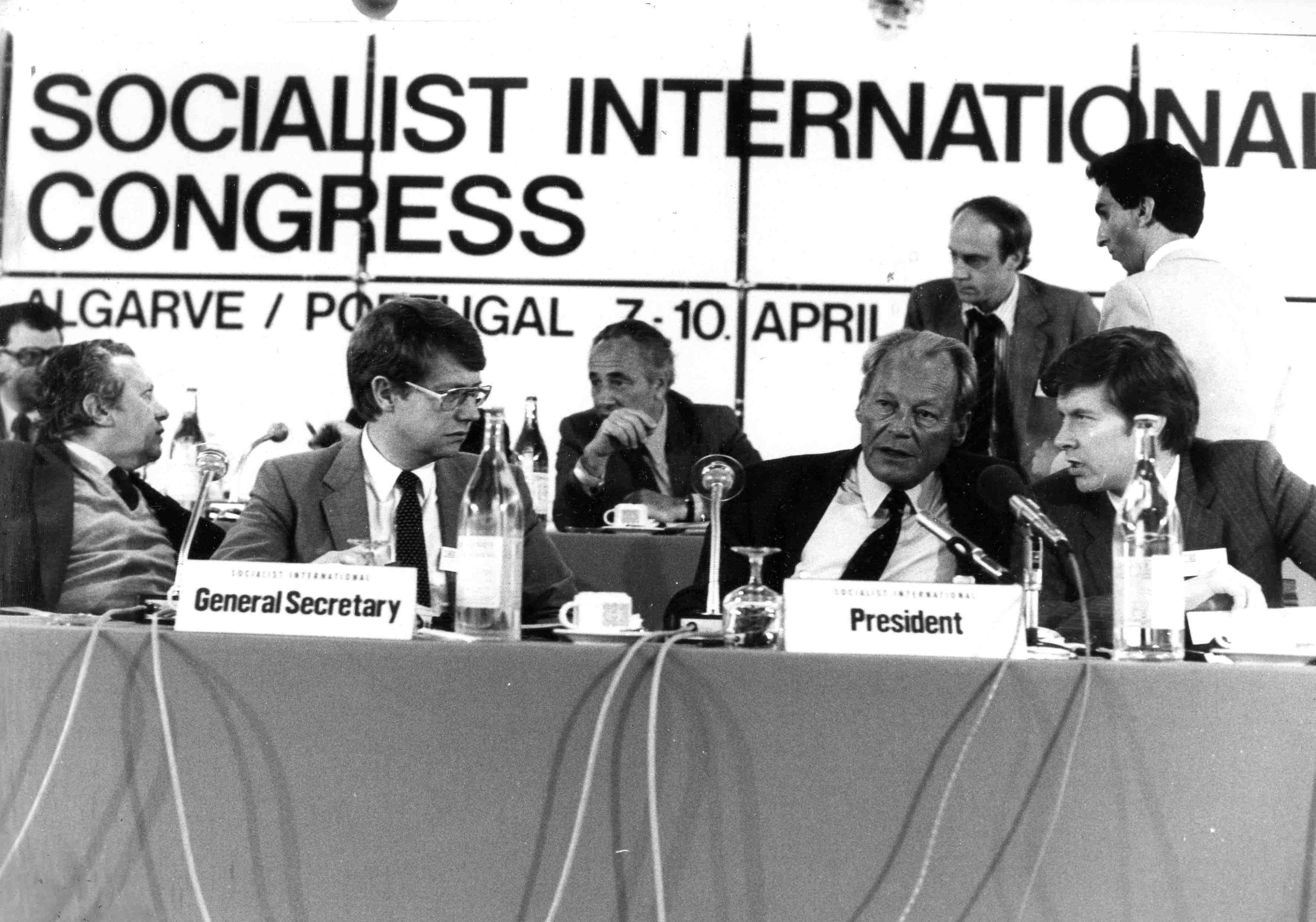
Socialist International Congress 1983. Brandt with outgoing general secretary Bernt Carlsson (left) and new general secretary Pentti Väänänen (right).

For sixteen years (1976–1992), Brandt was the president of the Socialist International. During that period, the number of Socialist International's mainly European member parties grew until there were more than a hundred socialist, social democratic, and labour political parties around the world. For the first seven years, this growth in SI membership had been prompted by the efforts of the Socialist International's Secretary-General, the Swede Bernt Carlsson. However, in early 1983, a dispute arose about what Carlsson perceived as the SI president's authoritarian approach. Carlsson then rebuked Brandt, saying, "This is a Socialist International – not a German International".

Next, against some vocal opposition, Brandt decided to move the next Socialist International Congress from Sydney, Australia to Portugal. Following this Socialist Congress in April 1983, Brandt retaliated against Carlsson by forcing him to step down from his position. However, the Austrian Chancellor, Bruno Kreisky, argued on behalf of Brandt: "It is a question of whether it is better to be pure or to have greater numbers". Carlsson was succeeded by the Finn Pentti Väänänen as Secretary General of the Socialist International.

During Brandt's presidency, the SI developed activities and dialogue on a number of International issues. This concerned the East–West conflict and arms race, on which the SI held high-level consultations with the leaderships of the United States and the Soviet Union, and on Afghanistan after 1979. The SI met with President Jimmy Carter and Vice Presidents Walter Mondale and George Bush, and with the CPSU Secretaries General Leonid Brezhnev and Mikhail Gorbachev and Soviet Head of State Andrei Gromyko. The SI also developed active contacts to promote dialogue concerning regional conflicts. Those included the Middle East, where they helped to build contacts between Israel and the PLO, and also in Southern Africa and Central America. In 1984, as the chairman of the SPD, Brandt initiated party dialogues with the Chinese Communist Party (CCP), making SPD the first international party relationship CCP established outside of other communist parties.

=== Brandt Report ===
In 1977, Brandt was appointed as the chairman of the Independent Commission for International Developmental Issues. This produced a report in 1980, which called for drastic changes in the global attitude towards development in the Third World. This became known as the Brandt Report.

=== Reunification ===
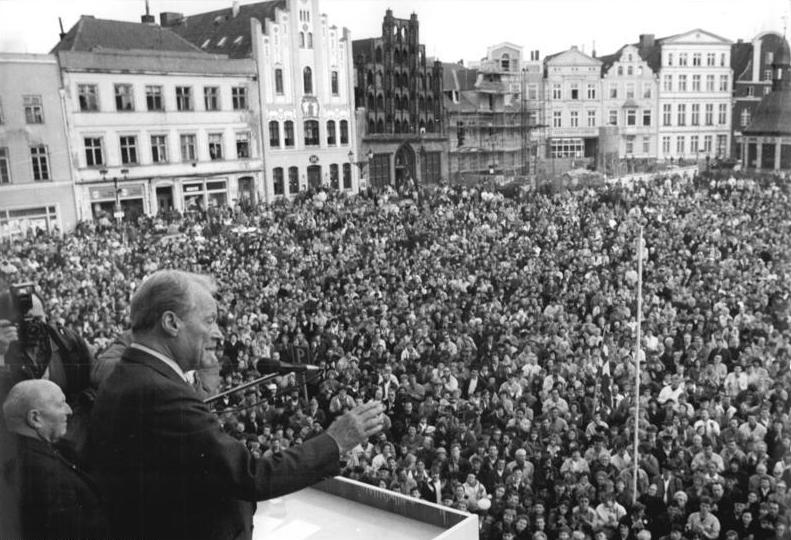
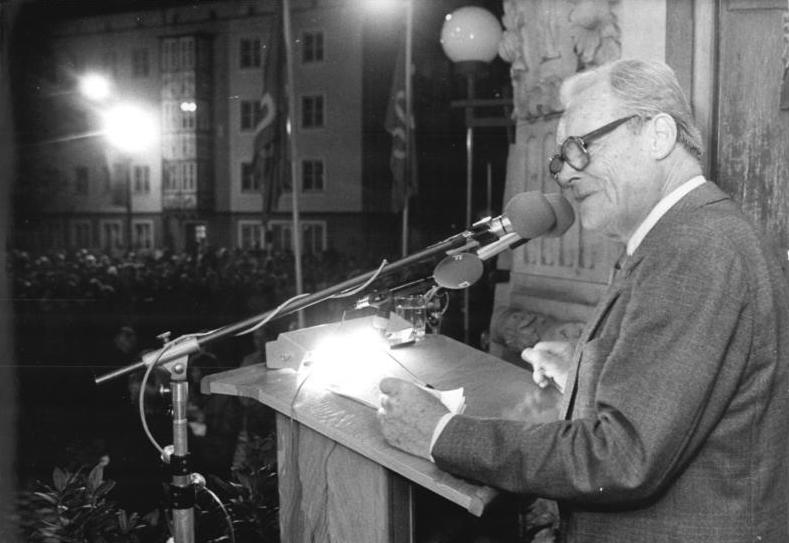
Brandt giving a speech in Wismar ahead of the 1990 East German general election (top) and in Dessau shortly before German reunification (bottom), 1990

In October 1979, Brandt met with the East German dissident, Rudolf Bahro, who had written The Alternative. Bahro and his supporters were attacked by the East German state security organisation Stasi, headed by Erich Mielke, for his writings, which had laid the theoretical foundation of a left-wing opposition to the ruling SED party and its dependent allies, and which promoted new and changed parties. All of this is now described as "change from within". Brandt had asked for Bahro's release, and Brandt welcomed Bahro's theories, which advanced the debate within his own Social Democratic Party.

On 11 September 1988, Brandt described the hope for German reunification as a delusion. In late 1989, Brandt became one of the first leftwing leaders in West Germany to publicly favor a quick reunification of Germany, instead of some sort of two-state federation or other kind of interim arrangement. Brandt's public statement, "Now grows together what belongs together", was widely quoted in those days.

=== Hostages in Iraq ===
One of Brandt's last public appearances was in flying to Baghdad, Iraq, to free Western hostages held by Saddam Hussein, following the Iraqi invasion of Kuwait in 1990. Brandt secured the release of a large number of them, and on 9 November 1990, his airplane landed with 174 freed hostages on board at Frankfurt Airport.

== Death and legacy ==
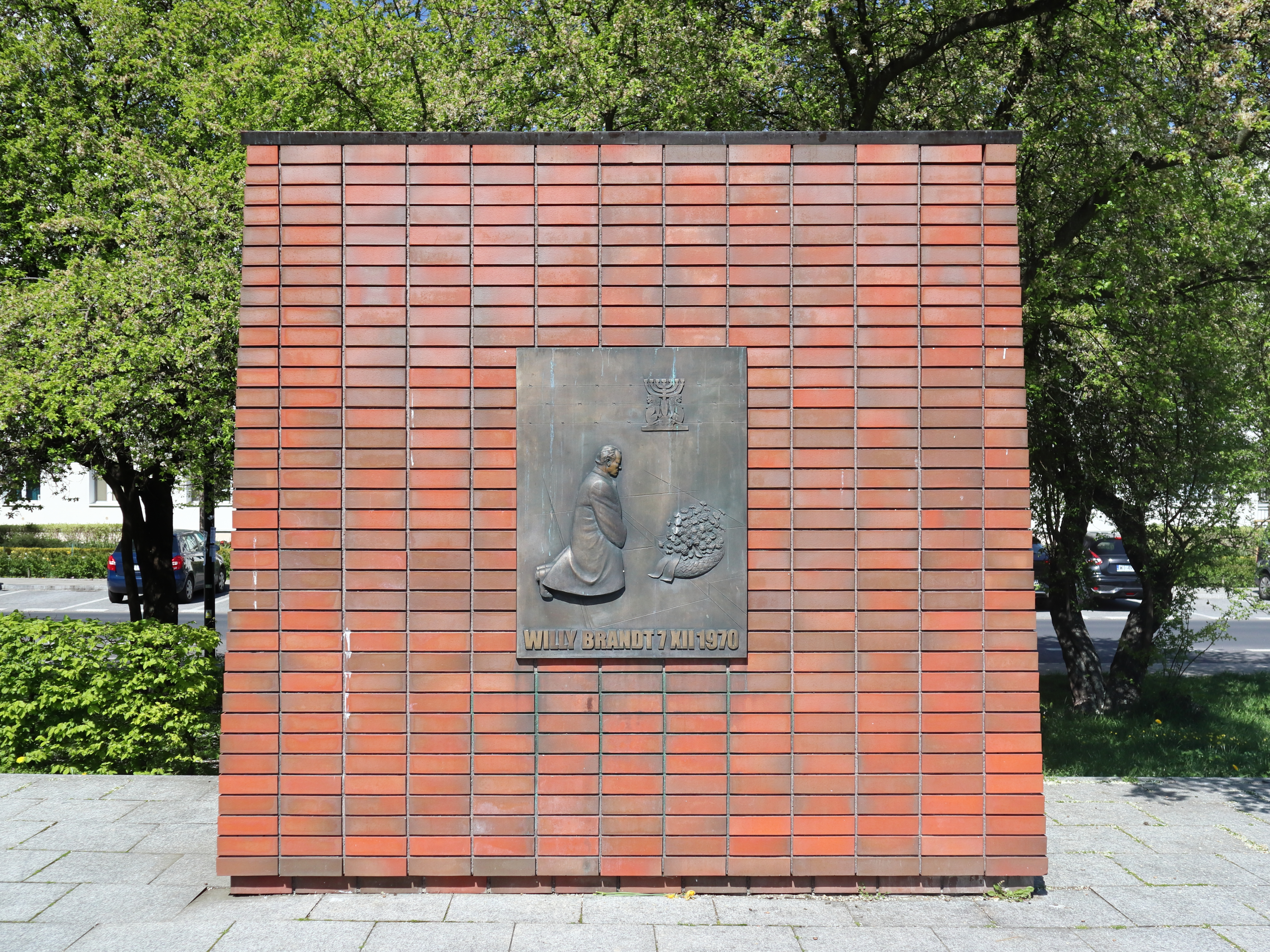
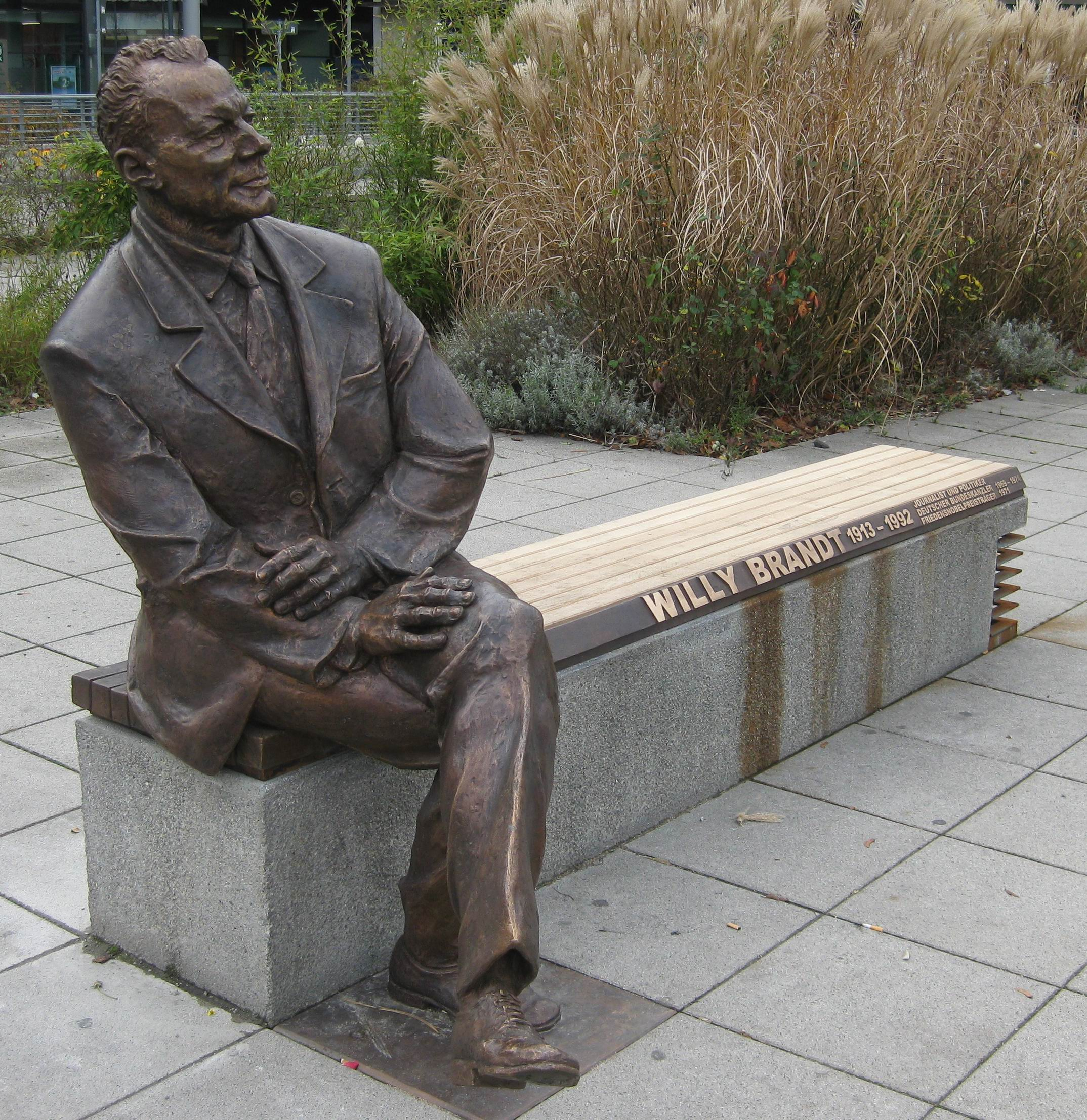
Willy Brandt Monument in Warsaw (top) and artist Josef Tabachnyk's memorial to Brandt in Nuremberg (bottom)

Brandt died of colon cancer at his home in Unkel, a town on the River Rhine, on 8 October 1992, at the age of 78. He was given a state funeral and was buried at the cemetery at Zehlendorf in Berlin.

The Federal Chancellor Willy Brandt Foundation was established in 1994. It serves to honour the memory of Brandt's political accomplishments and his commitment to peace, freedom and democracy. The foundation runs two permanent exhibitions: one in Berlin and the other in Lübeck, where Brandt was born. Other works of the foundation include oversight of Brandt's papers, speeches and letters (the Berlin Edition), historical research, as well as organising lectures and international conferences.

In 1997, a park in Stockholm was named in Brandt's honour. It is close to where he lived during his exile in Sweden 1941–1945.

When the SPD moved its headquarters from Bonn back to Berlin in the mid-1990s, the new headquarters was named the "Willy Brandt Haus". One of the buildings of the European Parliament in Brussels was named after him in 2008.

On 6 December 2000, a memorial to Brandt and Warschauer Kniefall was unveiled in Warsaw, Poland.

German artist Johannes Heisig painted several portraits of Brandt, of which one was unveiled as part of an honouring event at the German Historical Institute, Washington, D.C. on 18 March 2003. Spokesmen amongst others were former German Federal Minister Egon Bahr and former U.S. Secretary of State Henry Kissinger.

In 2009, the Willy-Brandt-Memorial was opened up in Nuremberg at the Willy-Brandt Square. It was created by the artist Josef Tabachnyk.

In 2009, the University of Erfurt renamed its graduate school of public administration as the Willy Brandt School of Public Policy. A private German-language secondary school in Warsaw, Poland, is also named after Brandt.

The main boulevard at the north entrance of the Montenegrin capital Podgorica was named Willy Brandt Boulevard in 2011.

Brandt also has an unusual memorial in Hammersmith in London, United Kingdom. In 1963, when he was mayor of West Berlin, Brandt travelled to Hammersmith with a street lamp from West Berlin and presented it to the mayor of Hammersmith to mark its twinning with Neukölln. The lamp now stands on the wall of Westcott Lodge, facing Furnival Gardens, with a commemorative plaque below it.

Although Brandt had only served five years in office as Chancellor of Germany, he remains one of the most popular politicians in the history of the Federal Republic of Germany.

Berlin Brandenburg Airport, which opened in late 2020, is also named in his honour.

== Brandt's family ==
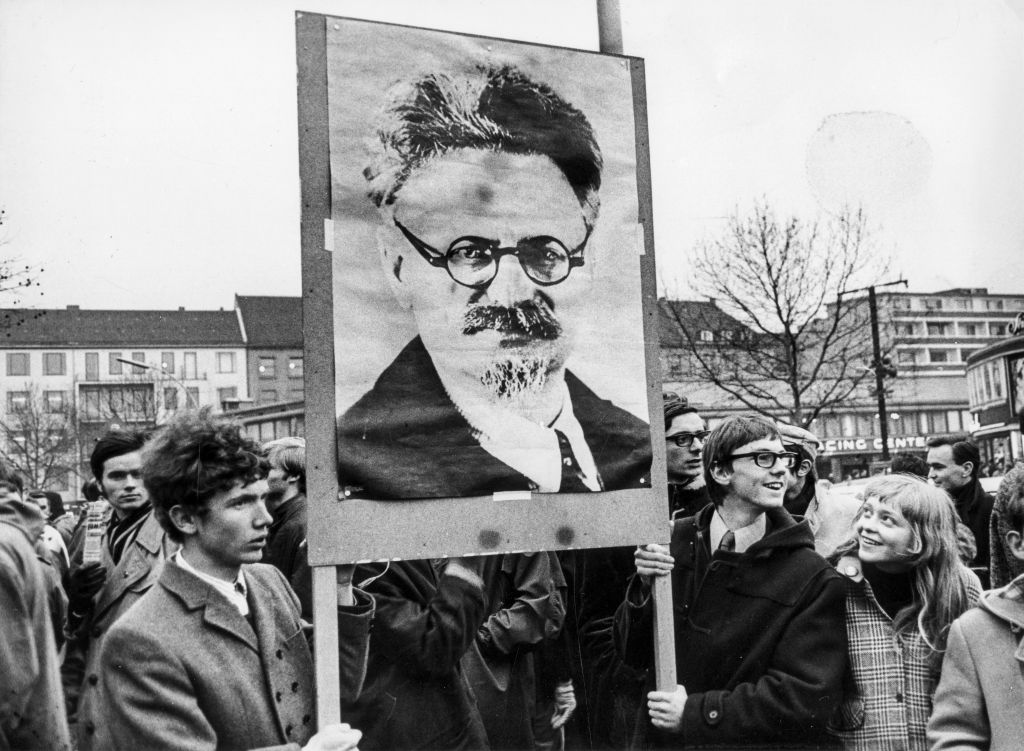
Peter Brandt (right) during the protests of 1968

From 1941 until 1948, Brandt was married to Anna Carlotta Thorkildsen (the daughter of a Norwegian father and a German-American mother). They had a daughter, Ninja Frahm (born in 1940). After Brandt and Thorkildsen were divorced in 1948, Brandt married the Norwegian-born German writer Rut Hansen in the same year. Hansen and Brandt had three sons: Peter Brandt (born in 1948), Lars Brandt (born in 1951) and Matthias Brandt (born in 1961). After 32 years of marriage, Willy Brandt and Rut Hansen Brandt divorced in 1980, and from the day that they were divorced, they never saw each other again. On 9 December 1983, Brandt married Brigitte Seebacher (born in 1946).

== Honours ==
=== Foreign honours ===
- Malaysia: Honorary Grand Commander of the Order of Loyalty to the Crown of Malaysia (S.S.M.) (1969)

== Selected works ==
- 1960 Mein Weg nach Berlin (My Path to Berlin), autobiography written with Leo Lania
- 1966 Draußen. Schriften während der Emigration. (Outside: Writings during the Emigration) ISBN 3-8012-1094-4
- 1968 Friedenspolitik in Europa (The Politics of Peace in Europe)
- 1976 Begegnungen und Einsichten 1960–1975 (Encounters and Insights 1960–1975) ISBN 3-455-08979-8
- 1982 Links und frei. Mein Weg 1930–1950 (Left and Free: My Path 1930–1950)
- 1986 Der organisierte Wahnsinn (Organized Lunacy)
- 1989 Erinnerungen (Memories) ISBN 3-549-07353-4
- 2002 Berliner Ausgabe, Werkauswahl, ed. for Bundeskanzler Willy Brandt Stiftung by Helga Grebing, Gregor Schöllgen and Heinrich August Winkler, 10 volumes, Dietz Verlag, Bonn 2002f, Collected Writings ISBN 3-8012-0305-0

== Bibliography ==
- Keller, Andrei V. "Masculine Friendship?: Willy Brandt and Leonid Brezhnev in the Context of the Energy Dialogue between West Germany and the USSR, 1970–1973." The Soviet and post-Soviet Review 44.2 (2017): 99–132.
- Kaplan, Gisela (2012). Contemporary Western European Feminism. Routledge. ISBN 9780415636810.
- Juneau, Jean-François (2011). "The limits of linkage: the Nixon administration and Willy Brandt's Ostpolitik, 1969–1972". International History Review. 33 (2): 277–297. doi:10.1080/07075332.2011.555447. S2CID 154269345.
- Kempe, Frederick (2011). Berlin 1961: Kennedy, Khrushchev, and the Most Dangerous Place on Earth. Penguin Group. ISBN 978-0-399-15729-5.
- Daum, Andreas (2008). Kennedy in Berlin. Cambridge University Press. ISBN 978-0-521-85824-3.
- Cooke, Lynn Prince; Gash, Vanessa (2007). "Panacea or Pitfall? Women's Part-time Employment and Marital Stability in West Germany, the United Kingdom and the United States" (PDF). GeNet Working Paper. 28. Gender Equality Network. Archived from the original (PDF) on 17 March 2012.
- Winkler, Heinrich August (2007). Sager, Alexander (ed.). Germany: the Long Road West, volume II: 1933–1990. Oxford University Press. ISBN 978-0-19-926598-5.
- Hofmann, Arne. "Small steps towards new frontiers? Ideas, concepts and the emergence of a détente strategy in the thinking of Willy Brandt and John F. Kennedy." Historical Research 79.205 (2006): 429–449.
- Mares, Isabela (2006). Taxation, Wage Bargaining, and Unemployment. Cambridge University Press. ISBN 9780511625688.
- Blackburn, Robin (2003). Banking on Death: or, Investing in Life: the History and Future of Pensions. Verso Books. ISBN 9781859844090.
- Banister, David (2002). Transport Planning. Spon. ISBN 9780415261715.
- Huber, Evelyne; Stephens, John D. (2001). Development and Crisis of the Welfare State. Parties and Policies in Global Markets. University of Chicago Press. ISBN 9780226356471.
- Callaghan, John T. (2000). The Retreat of Social Democracy. Manchester University Press. ISBN 9780719050312.
- Patton, David F. (1999). Cold War Politics in Postwar Germany. New York: St. Martin's Press. ISBN 9780312213619.
- Kommers, Donald P. (1997). The Constitutional Jurisprudence of the Federal Republic of Germany. Duke University Press. ISBN 9780822318385.
- Marshall, Barbara (1997). Willy Brandt: A Political Biography. Palgrave Macmillan UK. doi:10.1057/9780230390096. ISBN 978-1-349-39586-6.
- Marshall, Barbara. Willy Brandt: A Political Biography (1996) 184pp
- Ardagh, John (1996). Germany and the Germans. Penguin Books. ISBN 9780140252668.
- Braunthal, Gerard (1994). The German Social Democrats since 1969: a Party in Power and Opposition. Westview Press. ISBN 9780813315355.
- Abraham, Katharine G.; Houseman, Susan N. (1994). "Does employment protection inhibit labor market flexibility? Lessons from Germany, France, and Belgium" (PDF). In Rebecca M. Blank (ed.). Social Protection versus Economic Flexibility: Is There a Trade-Off?. University of Chicago Press. ISBN 0-226-05678-3.
- Brandt, Willy (1992). My Life in Politics. Viking. ISBN 9780670844357.
- Childs, David (1992). Germany in the Twentieth Century. Icon. ISBN 9780064308625.
- Bezelga, Artur; Brandon, Peter S. (1991). Management, Quality and Economics in Building. Spon. ISBN 9780419174707.
- Flora, Peter (1986). Growth to Limits: The Western European Welfare States Since World War II. Walter de Gruyter. ISBN 9783110111316.
- Lane, Peter (1985). Europe Since 1945: an Introduction. Barnes & Noble. ISBN 9780389205753.
- Dönhoff, Marion (1982). Foe Into Friend: the Makers of the New Germany from Konrad Adenauer to Helmut Schmidt. translated by Gabriele Annan. Palgrave Macmillan. ISBN 9780312296926.
- Kohler, Peter A.; Zacher, Hans F.; Partington, Martin, eds. (1982). The Evolution of Social Insurance 1881–1981: Studies of Germany, France, Great Britain, Austria, and Switzerland. Palgrave Macmillan. ISBN 9780312272852.
- Kellerman, Barbara. "Mentoring in political life: The case of Willy Brandt." American Political Science Review (1978): 422–433. online
- Binder, David (1975). The Other German: Willy Brandt's Life & Times. New Republic. ISBN 9780915220090.
- Miard-Delacroix, Hélène. Willy Brandt: Life of a statesman (Bloomsbury, 2016).
- Potthoff, Heinrich; Miller, Susanne (2006). The Social Democratic Party of Germany 1848–2005. translated by Martin Kane. Dietz Verlag J. H. W. Nachf. ISBN 9783801203658.
- Power, Anne (2002). Hovels to High Rise: State Housing in Europe Since 1850. Taylor & Francis. ISBN 9780415089357.
- Pridham, Geoffrey (1977). Christian Democracy in Western Germany: the CDU/CSU in Government and Opposition 1945–1976. Croom Helm. ISBN 9780856645082.
- Prittie, Terence (1974). Willy Brandt: Portrait of a Statesman. Schocken. ISBN 9780805235616.
- Radice; Radice (1986). Socialists in the Recession: the Search for Solidarity. Macmillan. ISBN 9780333388464.
- Rother, Bernd, and Klaus Larres, eds. Willy Brandt and International Relations: Europe, the USA and Latin America, 1974–1992 (Bloomsbury, 2018).
- Schäfers, Bernhard (1998). The State of Germany Atlas. Routledge. ISBN 9780415188265.
- Scheffer, Edith (2008). Burned Bridge: How East and West Germans Made the Iron Curtain. Oxford University Press. ISBN 9781109097603.
- Schewe, Dieter; Nordhorn, Karlhugo; Schenke, Klaus (1972). Survey of Social Security in the Federal Republic of Germany. Translated by Frank Kenny. Bonn: Federal Minister for Labour and Social Affairs.
- Schiek, Dagmar (2006). "Agency work – from marginalisation towards acceptance? Agency work in EU social and employment policy and the "implementation" of the draft directive on agency work into German law" (PDF). German Law Journal. 5 (10): 1233–1257. doi:10.1017/S2071832200013195. S2CID 141058426. Archived from the original (PDF) on 22 May 2013.
- Schmidt, Helmut (1982). Wolfram F. Hanrieder (ed.). Perspectives on Politics. Westview Press. ISBN 9780865312050.
- Schöllgen, Gregor (2001). Willy Brandt. Die Biographie. Berlin: Propyläen. ISBN 3-549-07142-6.
- Schoenborn, Benedikt. Reconciliation Road: Willy Brandt, Ostpolitik and the Quest for European Peace (Berghahn Books, 2020). online review
- Silvia, Stephen J.; Stolpe, Michael (2007). Health Care and Pension Reform (PDF). AICGS Policy Report. Vol. 30. American Institute for Contemporary German Studies, Johns Hopkins University Press. ISBN 978-1-933942-08-7. Archived from the original (PDF) on 28 November 2008.
- Sinn, Hans-Werner (2007). Can Germany Be Saved? The Malaise of the World's First Welfare State. Massachusetts Institute of Technology. ISBN 9780262195584.
- Solsten, Eric (1999). Germany: a Country Study. Diane. ISBN 9780788181795.
- Thelen, Kathleen Ann (1991). Union of Parts: Labor Politics in Postwar Germany. Cornell University Press. ISBN 9780801425868.
- Tomka, Béla (2004). Welfare in East and West: Hungarian Social Security in an International Comparison, 1918–1990. Akademie-Verlag. ISBN 9783050038711.
- Väänänen, Pentti (2012). Purppuraruusu ja samettinyrkki (in Finnish) (1st ed.). Kellastupa. ISBN 9789525787115.
- Vivekanandan, Bhagavathi. Global Visions of Olof Palme, Bruno Kreisky and Willy Brandt: International Peace and Security, Co-operation, and Development (Springer, 2016).
- Walker, Robert; Lawson, Roger; Townsend, Peter, eds. (1984). Responses to Poverty: Lessons from Europe. Associated University Presses. ISBN 0-8386-3222-X.
- Williamson, John B.; Pampel, Fred C. (2002). Old-Age Security in Comparative Perspective. Oxford University Press. ISBN 9780195068597.
- Wilsford, David, ed. (1995). Political Leaders of Contemporary Western Europe: a Biographical Dictionary. Greenwood Press. ISBN 9780313286230.

Political offices
Preceded by Otto Suhr	President of the West Berlin House of Representatives; 1955–1957	Succeeded by Kurt Landsberg
Preceded by Otto Suhr	Mayor of West Berlin; 1957–1966	Succeeded by Heinrich Albertz
Preceded by Kurt Sieveking	President of the Bundesrat; 1957–1958	Succeeded by Wilhelm Kaisen
Preceded by Gerhard Schröder	Federal Minister for Foreign Affairs; 1966–1969	Succeeded by Walter Scheel
Preceded by Hans-Christoph Seebohm	Vice-Chancellor of Germany; 1966–1969	Succeeded by Walter Scheel
Preceded by Kurt Georg Kiesinger	Chancellor of Germany; 1969–1974	Succeeded by Helmut Schmidt
Party political offices
Preceded by Erich Ollenhauer	Leader of the Social Democratic Party; 1964–1987	Succeeded by Hans-Jochen Vogel
Preceded by Bruno Pittermann	President of the Socialist International; 1976–1992	Succeeded by Pierre Mauroy
