= Kniefall von Warschau =

Gesture by Willy Brandt

Coordinates: 52°14′58″N 20°59′38″E

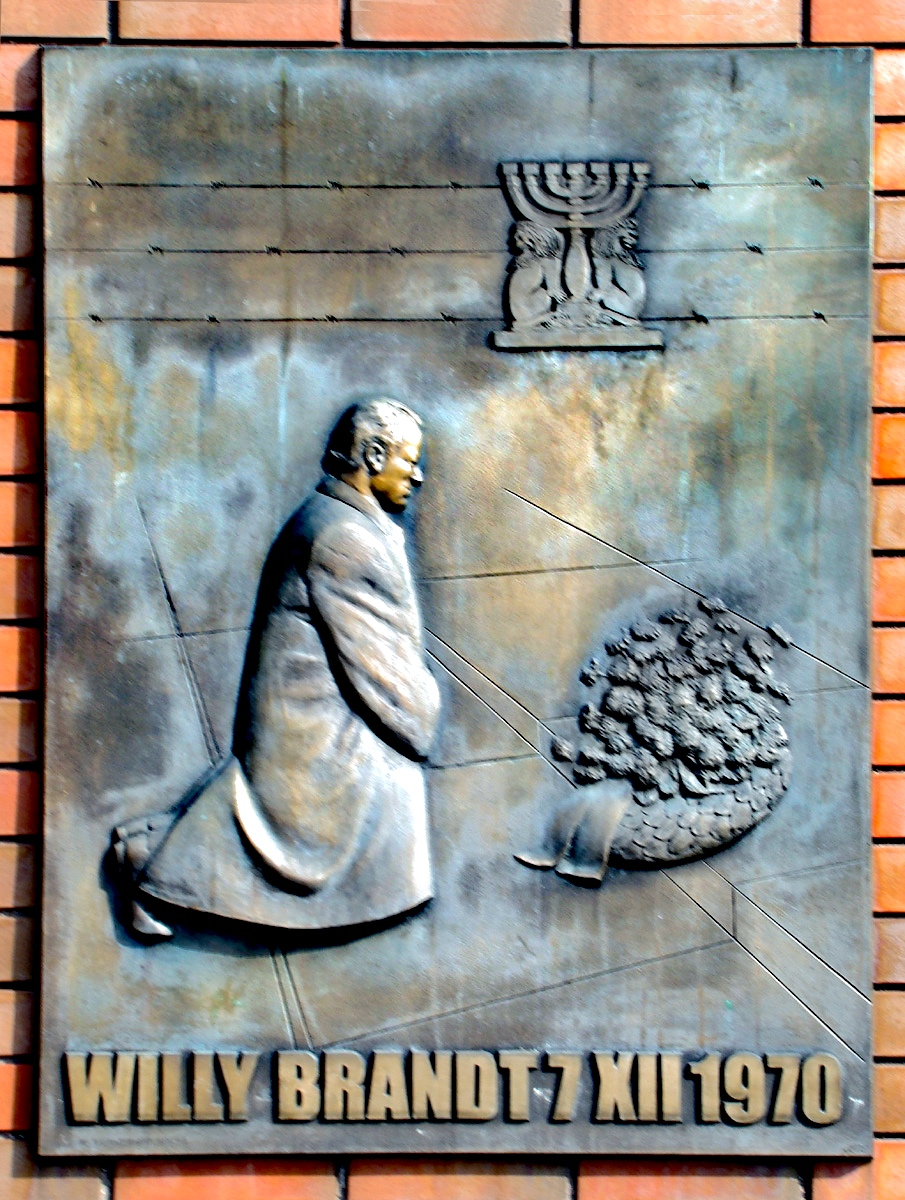
Plaque in Warsaw commemorating Brandt's action

Kniefall von Warschau (lit. 'Warsaw kneeling' or 'Warsaw kneel'), also referred to as Warschauer Kniefall, refers to West German chancellor Willy Brandt's gesture of kneeling before a memorial to the Warsaw Ghetto Uprising during a state visit to Poland in 1970. Perceived as a sign of profound humility, images of Brandt's action received widespread media attention. More broadly, the gesture came to symbolise Ostpolitik, Brandt's ultimately successful policy of diplomatically reconciling West Germany with its eastern neighbours following the Holocaust and the Second World War, while improving Germany's international standing by proving that a different, peaceful Germany was possible.

== Event ==
The event took place on December 7, 1970, in Warsaw, Polish People's Republic, during a visit to a monument to the German occupation-era Warsaw Ghetto Uprising. After laying a wreath, Brandt unexpectedly, and spontaneously, knelt. He remained silently in that position for a short time (about 30 seconds), surrounded by a large group of dignitaries and press photographers. Brandt had actively resisted the early Nazi regime, and had spent most of the time of Hitler's reign in exile. The occasion of Brandt's visit to Poland at the time was the signing of the Treaty of Warsaw between West Germany and Poland, guaranteeing German acceptance of the new borders of Poland. The treaty was one of the Brandt-initiated policy steps (the 'Ostpolitik') to ease tensions between West and East during the Cold War.

== Reactions ==
=== In Germany ===
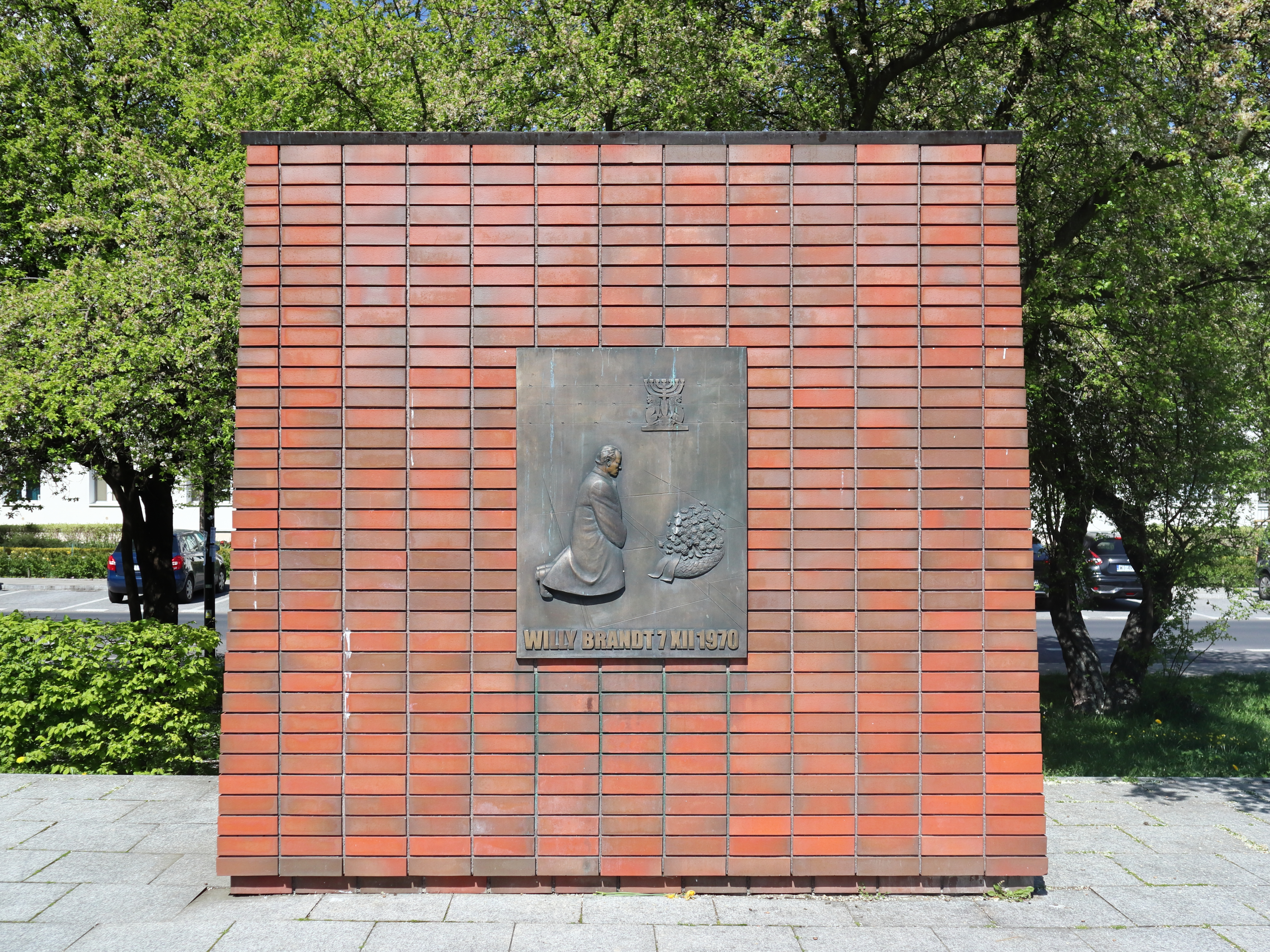
Willy Brandt Monument in Willy Brandt Square in Warsaw

On the same day, Brandt signed the Treaty of Warsaw, which acknowledged the Oder–Neisse line as the final German border with Poland. Both actions attracted controversy within Germany, as did Ostpolitik in general, which was supported by only a narrow majority of the people and had opposition within Brandt's own Social Democratic Party. Its voters had included a significant proportion of expellees from the formerly-German territories in Poland, most of whom left to support the conservative parties.

According to a Der Spiegel survey of the time, 48% of all West Germans thought the Kniefall was excessive, 41% said it was appropriate and 11% had no opinion. Brandt's victory in the late 1972 elections was heavily driven by the growing voter consensus that his Ostpolitik, symbolised by the Kniefall, alongside his reformist domestic policies, was crucial to rebuilding Germany's international reputation. Supported by a public eager to move past the nation's tarnished global standing, his party secured its best federal election result in history.

=== Internationally ===
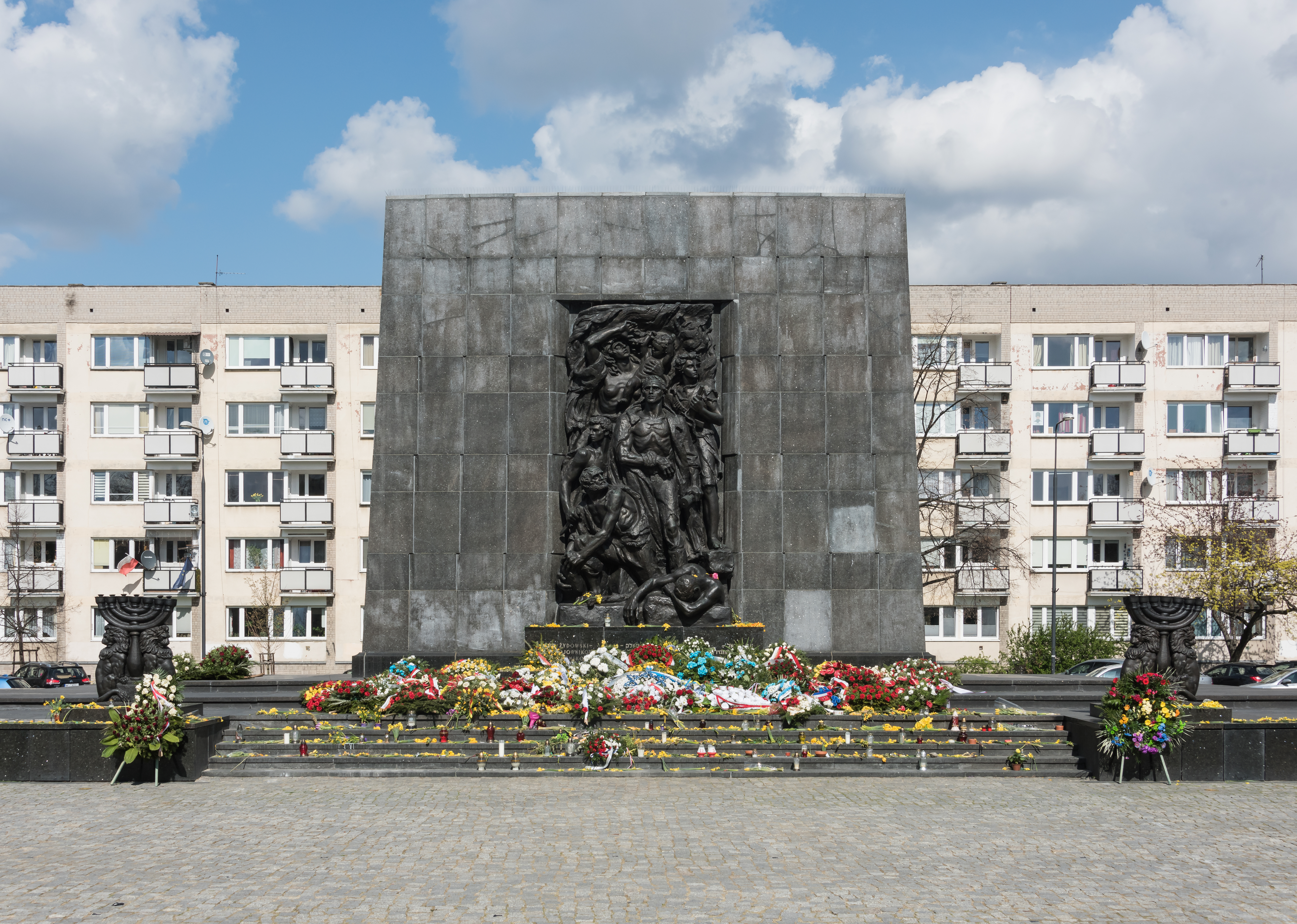
The Warsaw Ghetto Heroes memorial.

While at the time, positive reactions may have been limited, his show of humility was a small but vital step in bridging the gaps World War II had left between Germany and Eastern Europe. In historical terms, Brandt gained much renown for this act. He was named Time Person of the Year in 1970, with the magazine highlighting the Kniefall as one of the main reasons for his recognition, and it is thought to be one of the reasons he received the Nobel Peace Prize in 1971.

A monument to Willy Brandt was unveiled on 6 December 2000, in Willy Brandt Square in Warsaw (near the Warsaw Ghetto Heroes Monument) on the eve of the 30th anniversary of his famous gesture.

== Brandt's memories ==
Brandt was repeatedly interviewed about the genuflection and about his motives. He later noted that:

(German original) "Am Abgrund der deutschen Geschichte und unter der Last der Millionen Ermordeten tat ich, was Menschen tun, wenn die Sprache versagt."

(English translation) At the abyss of German history and under the weight of millions of murdered people, I did what humans do when speech fails them.

Egon Bahr, an eyewitness and Brandt's friend and political ally of many years, recalled in a 2010 interview: "The only thing he said was that at that moment facing the ribbon, he thought: Just laying the wreath is not enough."

== Later reception ==
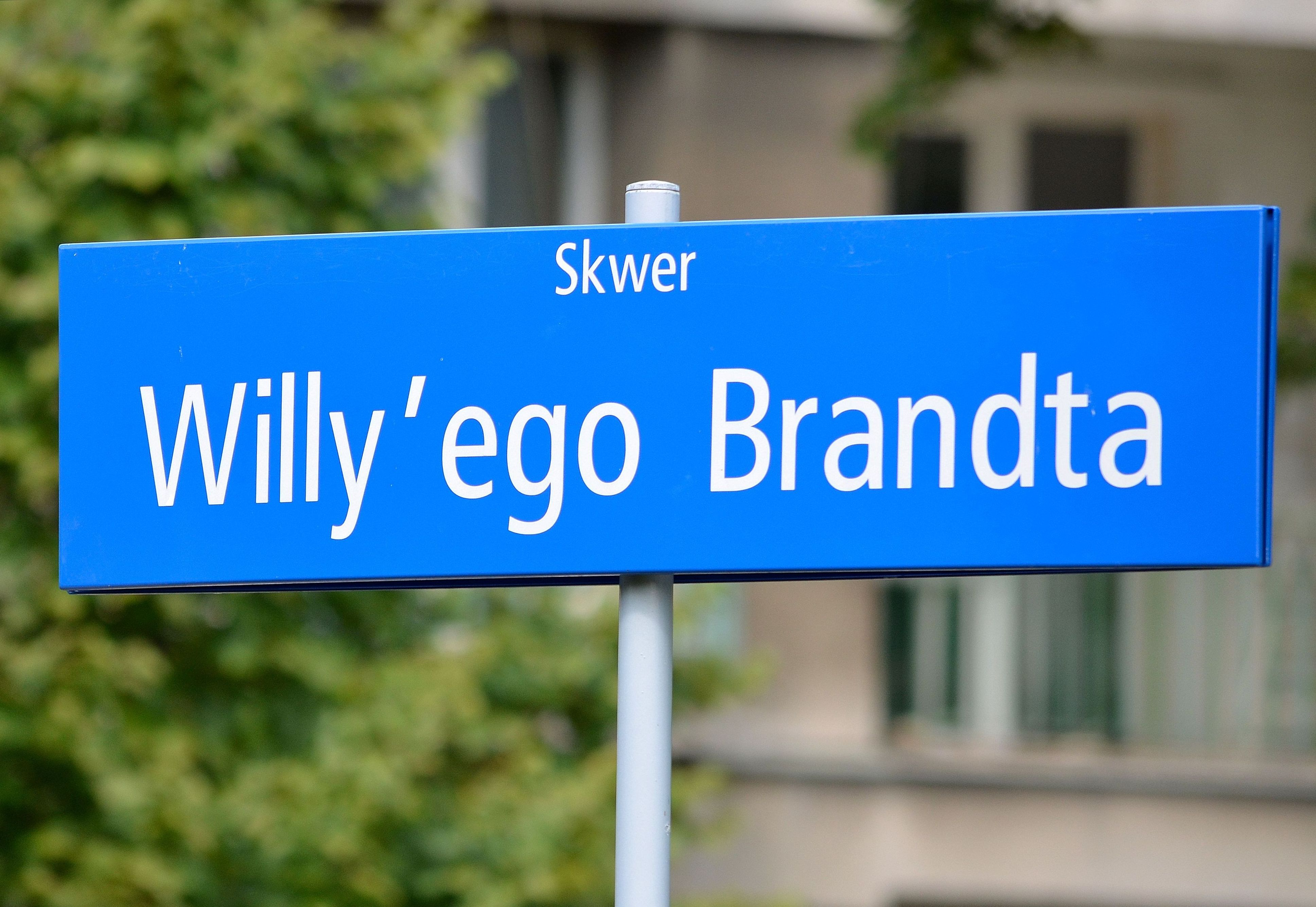
Skwer Willy'ego Brandta (Willy Brandt Square) in Warsaw

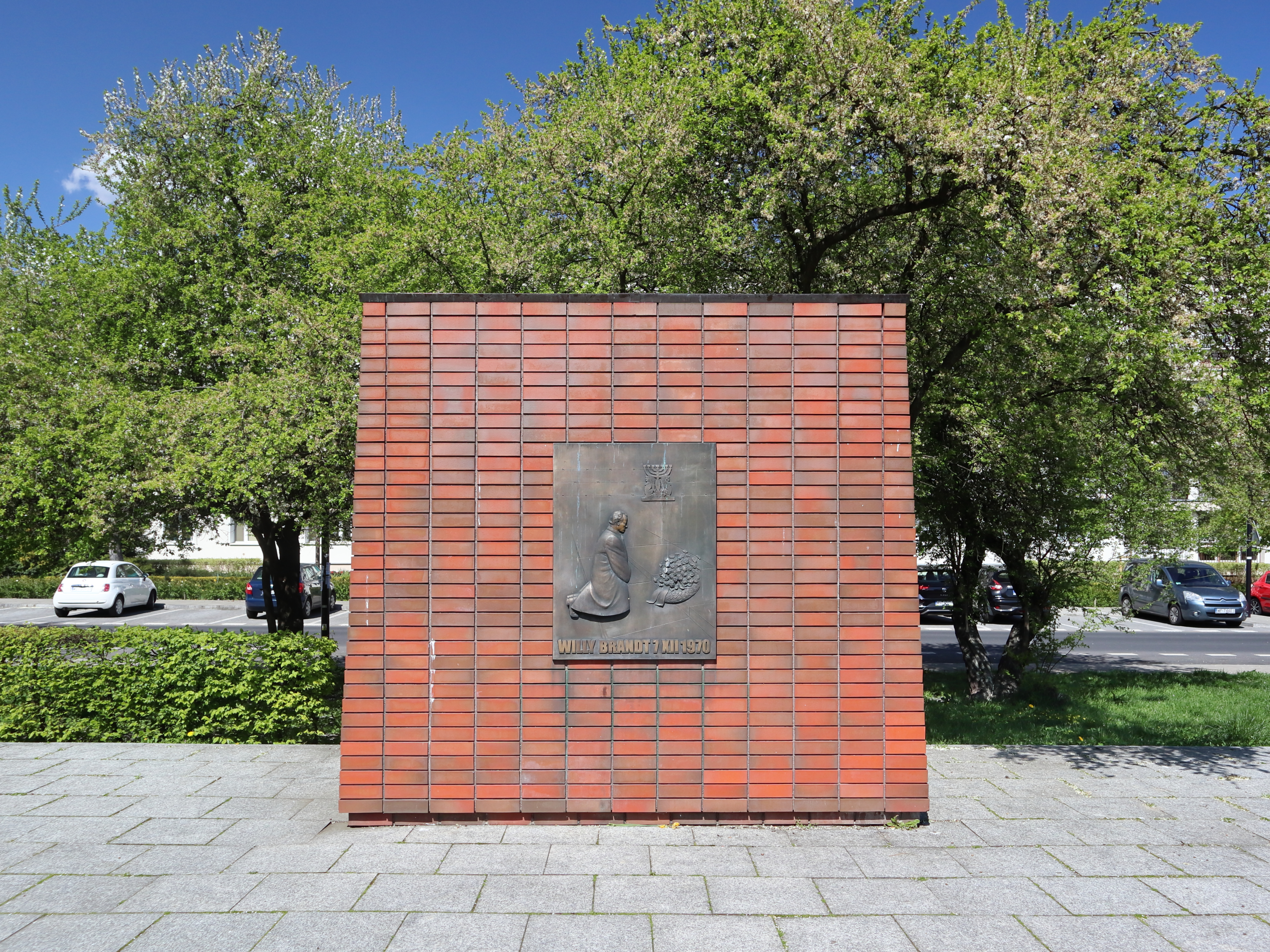
Monument of the 'Kniefall' on the Skwer Willy'ego Brandta

Reviewing the Kniefall one tends to agree that it played an important part in easing the tension between the Eastern and Western Blocs. The Treaty of Warsaw was signed on the very same day and it included the inviolability of the Oder-Neisse-line. Józef Cyrankiewicz (1911–1989) the Polish prime minister and survivor of the Auschwitz Concentration Camp signed. To expand on Brandt's memories, here are some later receptions:

There is a lot of speculation whether Brandt did this spontaneously. Willy Brandt wrote about that in his memoirs Erinnerungen (reminiscences):

"Again and again I have been asked what the deal was with the gesture. Was it planned? No, it wasn't. My closest colleagues were as surprised as those reporters and photographers standing close to me, as well as those keeping their distance, as they did not expect anything new. [...] I did not plan anything, but left Wilanów Palace with the feeling that I have to represent the special remembrance of the ghetto monument. At the abyss of German history and the weight of millions that have been murdered, I did, what people do when speech fails them."

Egon Bahr said in his reminiscence Zu meiner Zeit (Back in my time) 1996:

"Right as the motorcade moved towards the ghetto monument, Berthold Beitz and me compared our impressions. We calmly got out of the car and were in no hurry to get closer to the journalists and photographers - then everything went quiet. It is rare for this hard-boiled crowd to be silenced. While coming closer, someone whispered >>He's kneeling.<< I've just seen the picture, when it already went around the world. I did shy away of asking my friend during the last whiskey of the evening. That someone, who is free from any historic guilt will acknowledge the historic guilt of his people, came to my mind, but grand statements between us were uncommon. >> I've had the feeling that bowing my head won't be enough<<."

Walter Scheel wrote a letter to the news magazine Solinger Tageblatt in 2010 stating:

"In the moment, as we got out of the car and went in front of the monument the overall mood was overwhelming. Suddenly Willy Brandt went down on his knees, and everyone attending would have wanted to do the same. Everyone recognized this unplanned and spontaneous gesture as unique and impressive. [...] It was one of Willy Brandt’s abilities that I appreciated so much, to emotionally speak to the people and to set for everyone a recognizable example. I have never witnessed a comparable politician."

On December 7, 2010, the federal president Christian Wulff and the Polish president Bronislaw Komorowski, on its fortieth anniversary, held speeches about the meaning of this Kniefall for the Polish-German reconciliation. They were invited by Friedrich-Ebert Foundation in Warsaw and laid wreaths at the monument for the Warsaw Uprisings and the monument for the residents of the Warsaw Ghetto.

The writer Navid Kermani said in a celebration for 65 Jahre Grundgesetz (lit. 65 years of German constitution) in the German Bundestag on May 23, 2014:

"When and how did Germany, that was already regarded with suspicion due to its militarism in the 19th century, and seemed to be completely dishonored with the murder of 6 million jews, when and how did Germany regain its dignity? If I had to name a single day, a single happening, one gesture, that would show the word of 'Dignity' in German post-war history, then it would be the 'Kniefall von Warschau'."

The historian Michael Wolffsohn claimed on the fiftieth anniversary in 2020 on the German TV Channel ARD-alpha that it was "a wonderful symbol, but at that time a completely wrong symbol for the addressees". He argues that Brandt intended to apologize to the whole population of Poland, but chose a location mismatching his intent by confusing the Warsaw Ghetto Uprising with the Warsaw Uprising. While that mistake limited the immediate effect of the symbolic act in Poland at the time, Wolffsohn argues that nonetheless, it has since become a symbol of a new style and role of German foreign policy.

== Similar act ==
During a visit to the former Seodaemun Prison in Seoul in August 2015, former Japanese prime minister Yukio Hatoyama knelt in front of a memorial stone as an expression of apology for Japanese war crimes in World War II.

== See also ==
- Letter of Reconciliation of the Polish Bishops to the German Bishops
