= List of members of the 9th Bundestag =

This is a list of members of the 9th Bundestag – the lower house of parliament of the Federal Republic of Germany, whose members were in office from 1980 until 1983.

== Summary ==
This summary includes changes in the numbers of the three caucuses (CDU/CSU, SPD, FDP):

Time	Reason of change	CDU/CSU	SPD	FDP	Others	Total number
1980	First meeting	226	218	53		497
14 December 1981	Karl-Heinz Hansen leaves the SPD caucus and becomes unaffiliated	226	217	53	1	497
27 January 1982	Manfred Coppik leaves the SPD caucus and becomes unaffiliated	226	216	53	2	497
1 April 1982	Karl Hofmann leaves the SPD caucus and becomes unaffiliated	226	215	53	3	497
9 November 1982	Ingrid Matthäus-Maier leaves the FDP caucus and becomes unaffiliated	226	215	52	4	497
23 November 1982	Friedrich Hölscher leaves the FDP caucus and becomes unaffiliated	226	215	51	5	497
23 November 1982	Andreas von Schoeler leaves the FDP caucus and becomes unaffiliated	226	215	50	6	497
23 November 1982	Helga Schuchardt leaves the FDP caucus and becomes unaffiliated	226	215	49	7	497
2 December 1982	Ingrid Matthäus-Maier resigns	226	215	50	6	497
8 December 1982	Andreas von Schoeler resigns	226	215	51	5	497
10 February 1983	Helga Schuchardt resigns	226	215	52	4	497

== Members ==
State	No.	Constituency	Member	Party
Schleswig-Holstein	1	Flensburg – Schleswig	Egon Bahr	SPD
Schleswig-Holstein	2	Nordfriesland – Dithmarschen-Nord	Wolfgang Rayer	SPD
Schleswig-Holstein	3	Steinburg – Dithmarschen-Süd	Kurt Leuschner	SPD
Schleswig-Holstein	4	Rendsburg-Eckernförde	Heide Simonis	SPD
Schleswig-Holstein	5	Kiel	Norbert Gansel	SPD
Schleswig-Holstein	6	Plön – Neumünster	Horst Jungmann	SPD
Schleswig-Holstein	7	Pinneberg	Reinhard Ueberhorst (Note: Reinhard Ueberhorst resigned on 28 January 1981.)	SPD
Schleswig-Holstein	8	Segeberg – Stormarn-Nord	Günther Heyenn	SPD
Schleswig-Holstein	9	Ostholstein	Günther Jansen	SPD
Schleswig-Holstein	10	Herzogtum Lauenburg – Stormarn-Süd	Eckart Kuhlwein	SPD
Schleswig-Holstein	11	Lübeck	Björn Engholm	SPD
Schleswig-Holstein	List		Harm Dallmeyer	CDU
Schleswig-Holstein	List		Karl Eigen	CDU
Schleswig-Holstein	List		Karl-Heinz Narjes (Note: Karl-Heinz Narjes resigned on 9 January 1981.)	CDU
Schleswig-Holstein	List		Rolf Olderog	CDU
Schleswig-Holstein	List		Ingrid Roitzsch	CDU
Schleswig-Holstein	List		Willi-Peter Sick	CDU
Schleswig-Holstein	List		Hans-Jürgen Stutzer	CDU
Schleswig-Holstein	List		Olaf Baron von Wrangel (Note: Olaf Baron von Wrangel resigned on 3 April 1982.)	CDU
Schleswig-Holstein	List		Peter Kurt Würzbach	CDU
Schleswig-Holstein	List		Ekkehart Eymer (Note: Ekkehart Eymer took office on 14 January 1981, to succeed Karl-Heinz Narjes.)	CDU
Schleswig-Holstein	List		Dietrich Austermann (Note: Dietrich Austermann took office on 16 April 1982, to succeed Olaf Baron von Wrangel.)	CDU
Schleswig-Holstein	List		Uwe Ronneburger	FDP
Schleswig-Holstein	List		Wolf-Dieter Zumpfort	FDP
Schleswig-Holstein	List		Werner Zywietz	FDP
Schleswig-Holstein	List		Lieselott Blunck (Note: Lieselott Blunck took office on 30 January 1981, to succeed Reinhard Ueberhorst.)	SPD
Hamburg	12	Hamburg-Mitte	Freimut Duve	SPD
Hamburg	13	Hamburg-Altona	Horst Gobrecht	SPD
Hamburg	14	Hamburg-Eimsbüttel	Peter Paterna	SPD
Hamburg	15	Hamburg-Nord	Hans Apel	SPD
Hamburg	16	Hamburg-Wandsbek	Alfons Pawelczyk (Note: Alfons Pawelczyk resigned on 18 December 1980.)	SPD
Hamburg	17	Hamburg-Bergedorf	Helmut Schmidt	SPD
Hamburg	18	Hamburg-Harburg	Herbert Wehner	SPD
Hamburg	List		Jürgen Echternach	CDU
Hamburg	List		Dirk Fischer	CDU
Hamburg	List		Klaus Francke	CDU
Hamburg	List		Volker Rühe	CDU
Hamburg	List		Rainer Funke	FDP
Hamburg	List		Helga Schuchardt (Note: Helga Schuchardt resigned on 10 February 1983.)	FDP
Hamburg	List		Klaus Brunnstein (Note: Klaus Brunnstein took office on 11 February 1983, to succeed Helga Schuchardt.)	FDP
Hamburg	List		Eugen Glombig (Note: Eugen Glombig took office on 18 December 1980, to succeed Alfons Pawelczyk.)	SPD
Lower Saxony	19	Aurich – Emden	Carl Ewen	SPD
Lower Saxony	20	Unterems	Rudolf Seiters	CDU
Lower Saxony	21	Friesland – Wilhelmshaven	Herbert Ehrenberg	SPD
Lower Saxony	22	Oldenburg – Ammerland	Walter Polkehn	SPD
Lower Saxony	23	Delmenhorst – Wesermarsch	Margitta Terborg	SPD
Lower Saxony	24	Cuxhaven	Karl-Arnold Eickmeyer	SPD
Lower Saxony	25	Stade	Wolfgang Schwenk	SPD
Lower Saxony	26	Mittelems	Burkhard Ritz (Note: Burkhard Ritz resigned on 2 December 1980.)	CDU
Lower Saxony	27	Cloppenburg – Vechta	Manfred Carstens	CDU
Lower Saxony	28	Diepholz	Peter Würtz	SPD
Lower Saxony	29	Verden	Arne Börnsen	SPD
Lower Saxony	30	Soltau – Rotenburg	Ingeborg Hoffmann	CDU
Lower Saxony	31	Lüneburg – Lüchow-Dannenberg	Horst Schröder	CDU
Lower Saxony	32	Osnabrück-Land	Reinhard von Schorlemer	CDU
Lower Saxony	33	Osnabrück	Alfred Emmerlich	SPD
Lower Saxony	34	Nienburg – Schaumburg	Friedel Schirmer	SPD
Lower Saxony	35	Harburg	Herbert Helmrich	CDU
Lower Saxony	36	Stadt Hannover I	Egon Franke	SPD
Lower Saxony	37	Stadt Hannover II	Helmut Rohde	SPD
Lower Saxony	38	Hannover-Land I	Gerhard Schröder	SPD
Lower Saxony	39	Celle – Uelzen	Hans Hubrig (Note: Hans Hubrig died on 25 March 1982.)	CDU
Lower Saxony	40	Gifhorn – Peine	Adolf Stockleben	SPD
Lower Saxony	41	Hameln – Holzminden	Brigitte Traupe	SPD
Lower Saxony	42	Hannover-Land II	Günter Kiehm	SPD
Lower Saxony	43	Hildesheim	Hermann Rappe	SPD
Lower Saxony	44	Salzgitter – Wolfenbüttel	Hans-Jürgen Junghans	SPD
Lower Saxony	45	Braunschweig	Klaus-Dieter Kühbacher	SPD
Lower Saxony	46	Helmstedt – Wolfsburg	Rudolf Hauck	SPD
Lower Saxony	47	Goslar	Jürgen Linde	SPD
Lower Saxony	48	Northeim – Osterode	Martin Schmidt	SPD
Lower Saxony	49	Göttingen	Lothar Curdt	SPD
Lower Saxony	List		Ursula Benedix	CDU
Lower Saxony	List		Werner Broll	CDU
Lower Saxony	List		Joachim Clemens	CDU
Lower Saxony	List		Heinrich Franke	CDU
Lower Saxony	List		Wolfgang von Geldern	CDU
Lower Saxony	List		Karl-Heinz Hornhues	CDU
Lower Saxony	List		Dietmar Kansy	CDU
Lower Saxony	List		Walther Leisler Kiep (Note: Walther Leisler Kiep resigned on 26 April 1982.)	CDU
Lower Saxony	List		Hans Hugo Klein	CDU
Lower Saxony	List		Volkmar Köhler	CDU
Lower Saxony	List		Erich Maaß	CDU
Lower Saxony	List		Engelbert Nelle	CDU
Lower Saxony	List		Hanna Neumeister	CDU
Lower Saxony	List		Eberhard Pohlmann	CDU
Lower Saxony	List		Helmut Sauer	CDU
Lower Saxony	List		Diedrich Schröder	CDU
Lower Saxony	List		Rudolf Sprung	CDU
Lower Saxony	List		Ludolf von Wartenberg	CDU
Lower Saxony	List		Martin Oldenstädt (Note: Martin Oldenstädt took office on 5 December 1980, to succeed Burkhard Ritz.)	CDU
Lower Saxony	List		Karl-Hans Lagershausen (Note: Karl-Hans Lagershausen took office on 29 March 1982, to succeed Hans Hubrig.)	CDU
Lower Saxony	List		Herbert Lattmann (Note: Herbert Lattmann took office on 27 April 1982, to succeed Walther Leisler Kiep.)	CDU
Lower Saxony	List		Karl Ahrens	SPD
Lower Saxony	List		Helmuth Möhring	SPD
Lower Saxony	List		Paul Neumann	SPD
Lower Saxony	List		Volker Neumann	SPD
Lower Saxony	List		Jan Oostergetelo	SPD
Lower Saxony	List		Peter Struck	SPD
Lower Saxony	List		Günther Tietjen	SPD
Lower Saxony	List		Günther Bredehorn	FDP
Lower Saxony	List		Detlef Kleinert	FDP
Lower Saxony	List		Friedrich Neuhausen	FDP
Lower Saxony	List		Erke Noth	FDP
Lower Saxony	List		Jürgen Timm	FDP
Lower Saxony	List		Friedrich Wendig	FDP
Lower Saxony	List		Torsten Wolfgramm	FDP
Bremen	50	Bremen-Ost	Ernst Waltemathe	SPD
Bremen	51	Bremen-West	Claus Grobecker	SPD
Bremen	52	Bremerhaven – Bremen-Nord	Horst Grunenberg	SPD
Bremen	List		Reinhard Metz	CDU
North Rhine-Westphalia	53	Aachen	Hans Stercken	CDU
North Rhine-Westphalia	54	Kreis Aachen	Erich Berschkeit	SPD
North Rhine-Westphalia	55	Heinsberg	Adolf Spies von Büllesheim	CDU
North Rhine-Westphalia	56	Düren	Wolfgang Vogt	CDU
North Rhine-Westphalia	57	Erftkreis I	Klaus Lennartz	SPD
North Rhine-Westphalia	58	Euskirchen – Erftkreis II	Peter Milz	CDU
North Rhine-Westphalia	59	Cologne I	Hans-Jürgen Wischnewski	SPD
North Rhine-Westphalia	60	Cologne II	Anke Fuchs	SPD
North Rhine-Westphalia	61	Cologne III	Konrad Gilges	SPD
North Rhine-Westphalia	62	Cologne IV	Günter Herterich	SPD
North Rhine-Westphalia	63	Bonn	Alo Hauser	CDU
North Rhine-Westphalia	64	Rhein-Sieg-Kreis I	Adolf Herkenrath	CDU
North Rhine-Westphalia	65	Rhein-Sieg-Kreis II	Franz Möller	CDU
North Rhine-Westphalia	66	Oberbergischer Kreis	Horst Waffenschmidt	CDU
North Rhine-Westphalia	67	Rheinisch-Bergischer Kreis I	Franz Heinrich Krey	CDU
North Rhine-Westphalia	68	Leverkusen – Rheinisch-Bergischer Kreis II	Bruno Wiefel	SPD
North Rhine-Westphalia	69	Wuppertal I	Rudolf Dreßler	SPD
North Rhine-Westphalia	70	Wuppertal II	Willfried Penner	SPD
North Rhine-Westphalia	71	Solingen – Remscheid	Heinz Schreiber	SPD
North Rhine-Westphalia	72	Mettmann I	Uwe Holtz	SPD
North Rhine-Westphalia	73	Mettmann II	Heinz Pensky	SPD
North Rhine-Westphalia	74	Düsseldorf I	Gottfried Arnold	CDU
North Rhine-Westphalia	75	Düsseldorf II	Manfred Geßner	SPD
North Rhine-Westphalia	76	Neuss I	Heinz Günther Hüsch	CDU
North Rhine-Westphalia	77	Neuss II	Willy Wimmer	CDU
North Rhine-Westphalia	78	Mönchengladbach	Wolfgang Feinendegen	CDU
North Rhine-Westphalia	79	Krefeld	Volkmar Kretkowski	SPD
North Rhine-Westphalia	80	Viersen	Julius Louven	CDU
North Rhine-Westphalia	81	Kleve	Jochen van Aerssen	CDU
North Rhine-Westphalia	82	Wesel I	Uwe Jens	SPD
North Rhine-Westphalia	83	Wesel II	Jürgen Schmude	SPD
North Rhine-Westphalia	84	Duisburg I	Helmut Wieczorek	SPD
North Rhine-Westphalia	85	Duisburg II	Günter Schluckebier	SPD
North Rhine-Westphalia	86	Oberhausen	Erich Meinike	SPD
North Rhine-Westphalia	87	Mülheim	Thomas Schröer	SPD
North Rhine-Westphalia	88	Essen I	Otto Reschke	SPD
North Rhine-Westphalia	89	Essen II	Peter Reuschenbach	SPD
North Rhine-Westphalia	90	Essen III	Antje Huber	SPD
North Rhine-Westphalia	91	Recklinghausen I	Erich Wolfram	SPD
North Rhine-Westphalia	92	Recklinghausen II	Ulrich Steger	SPD
North Rhine-Westphalia	93	Gelsenkirchen I	Joachim Poß	SPD
North Rhine-Westphalia	94	Gelsenkirchen II – Recklinghausen III	Heinz Menzel	SPD
North Rhine-Westphalia	95	Bottrop – Recklinghausen IV	Franz-Josef Mertens	SPD
North Rhine-Westphalia	96	Borken	Hermann Josef Unland	CDU
North Rhine-Westphalia	97	Coesfeld – Steinfurt I	Wilhelm Rawe	CDU
North Rhine-Westphalia	98	Steinfurt II	Gottfried Köster	CDU
North Rhine-Westphalia	99	Münster	Friedrich-Adolf Jahn	CDU
North Rhine-Westphalia	100	Warendorf	Heinrich Windelen	CDU
North Rhine-Westphalia	101	Gütersloh	Ottfried Hennig	CDU
North Rhine-Westphalia	102	Bielefeld	Kurt Vogelsang	SPD
North Rhine-Westphalia	103	Herford	Günter Biermann	SPD
North Rhine-Westphalia	104	Minden-Lübbecke	Lothar Ibrügger	SPD
North Rhine-Westphalia	105	Lippe I	Erhard Mahne	SPD
North Rhine-Westphalia	106	Höxter – Lippe II	Meinolf Michels	CDU
North Rhine-Westphalia	107	Paderborn	Heinrich Pohlmeier	CDU
North Rhine-Westphalia	108	Hagen	Lothar Wrede	SPD
North Rhine-Westphalia	109	Ennepe-Ruhr-Kreis I	Eugen von der Wiesche	SPD
North Rhine-Westphalia	110	Bochum I	Karl Liedtke	SPD
North Rhine-Westphalia	111	Bochum II – Ennepe-Ruhr-Kreis II	Herbert Baack	SPD
North Rhine-Westphalia	112	Herne	Heinz Westphal	SPD
North Rhine-Westphalia	113	Dortmund I	Hans-Eberhard Urbaniak	SPD
North Rhine-Westphalia	114	Dortmund II	Alfred Meininghaus	SPD
North Rhine-Westphalia	115	Dortmund III	Werner Zeitler	SPD
North Rhine-Westphalia	116	Unna I	Manfred Schulte	SPD
North Rhine-Westphalia	117	Hamm – Unna II	Udo Fiebig	SPD
North Rhine-Westphalia	118	Soest	Hermann Kroll-Schlüter	CDU
North Rhine-Westphalia	119	Hochsauerlandkreis	Ferdinand Tillmann	CDU
North Rhine-Westphalia	120	Siegen-Wittgenstein I	Hermann Schmidt (Note: Hermann Schmidt died on 10 February 1983.)	SPD
North Rhine-Westphalia	121	Olpe – Siegen-Wittgenstein II	Willi Weiskirch	CDU
North Rhine-Westphalia	122	Märkischer Kreis I	Otto Wulff	CDU
North Rhine-Westphalia	123	Märkischer Kreis II	Günter Topmann	SPD
North Rhine-Westphalia	List		Rainer Barzel	CDU
North Rhine-Westphalia	List		Jochen Borchert	CDU
North Rhine-Westphalia	List		Gerhard Braun	CDU
North Rhine-Westphalia	List		Paul Breuer	CDU
North Rhine-Westphalia	List		Klaus Daweke	CDU
North Rhine-Westphalia	List		Leni Fischer	CDU
North Rhine-Westphalia	List		Ludwig Gerstein	CDU
North Rhine-Westphalia	List		Horst Günther	CDU
North Rhine-Westphalia	List		Hansheinz Hauser	CDU
North Rhine-Westphalia	List		Peter von der Heydt Freiherr von Massenbach	CDU
North Rhine-Westphalia	List		Martin Horstmeier	CDU
North Rhine-Westphalia	List		Herbert Hupka	CDU
North Rhine-Westphalia	List		Agnes Hürland-Büning	CDU
North Rhine-Westphalia	List		Irmgard Karwatzki	CDU
North Rhine-Westphalia	List		Herbert W. Köhler	CDU
North Rhine-Westphalia	List		Karl Lamers	CDU
North Rhine-Westphalia	List		Norbert Lammert	CDU
North Rhine-Westphalia	List		Egon Lampersbach (Note: Egon Lampersbach died on 16 December 1982.)	CDU
North Rhine-Westphalia	List		Heinz Landré	CDU
North Rhine-Westphalia	List		Paul Löher	CDU
North Rhine-Westphalia	List		Reinhard Meyer zu Bentrup	CDU
North Rhine-Westphalia	List		Paul Mikat	CDU
North Rhine-Westphalia	List		Adolf Müller	CDU
North Rhine-Westphalia	List		Alfons Müller	CDU
North Rhine-Westphalia	List		Winfried Pinger	CDU
North Rhine-Westphalia	List		Heinz-Jürgen Prangenberg	CDU
North Rhine-Westphalia	List		Gerhard Reddemann	CDU
North Rhine-Westphalia	List		Hans Peter Schmitz	CDU
North Rhine-Westphalia	List		Hans Werner Schmöle	CDU
North Rhine-Westphalia	List		Friedrich Vogel	CDU
North Rhine-Westphalia	List		Günter Volmer	CDU
North Rhine-Westphalia	List		Helga Wex	CDU
North Rhine-Westphalia	List		Dorothee Wilms	CDU
North Rhine-Westphalia	List		Paul Hoffacker (Note: Paul Hoffacker took office on 21 December 1982, to succeed Egon Lampersbach.)	CDU
North Rhine-Westphalia	List		Helmuth Becker	SPD
North Rhine-Westphalia	List		Hans Gottfried Bernrath	SPD
North Rhine-Westphalia	List		Willy Brandt	SPD
North Rhine-Westphalia	List		Hermann Buschfort	SPD
North Rhine-Westphalia	List		Wolf-Michael Catenhusen	SPD
North Rhine-Westphalia	List		Horst Ehmke	SPD
North Rhine-Westphalia	List		Helmut Esters	SPD
North Rhine-Westphalia	List		Horst Ginnuttis	SPD
North Rhine-Westphalia	List		Karl-Heinz Hansen	SPD
North Rhine-Westphalia	List		Dieter Heistermann	SPD
North Rhine-Westphalia	List		Horst Jaunich	SPD
North Rhine-Westphalia	List		Karl-Heinz Klejdzinski	SPD
North Rhine-Westphalia	List		Franz Müntefering	SPD
North Rhine-Westphalia	List		Wilhelm Nöbel	SPD
North Rhine-Westphalia	List		Rudolf Purps	SPD
North Rhine-Westphalia	List		Annemarie Renger	SPD
North Rhine-Westphalia	List		Engelbert Sander	SPD
North Rhine-Westphalia	List		Günter Schlatter	SPD
North Rhine-Westphalia	List		Helga Schmedt	SPD
North Rhine-Westphalia	List		Adolf Schmidt	SPD
North Rhine-Westphalia	List		Erwin Stahl	SPD
North Rhine-Westphalia	List		Heinz-Alfred Steiner	SPD
North Rhine-Westphalia	List		Waltraud Steinhauer	SPD
North Rhine-Westphalia	List		Klaus Thüsing	SPD
North Rhine-Westphalia	List		Josef Vosen	SPD
North Rhine-Westphalia	List		Lothar Witek	SPD
North Rhine-Westphalia	List		Heinz Assmann (Note: Heinz Assmann took office on 24 February 1983, to succeed Hermann Schmidt.)	SPD
North Rhine-Westphalia	List		Gerhart Baum	FDP
North Rhine-Westphalia	List		Klaus Beckmann	FDP
North Rhine-Westphalia	List		Carola von Braun	FDP
North Rhine-Westphalia	List		Dieter-Julius Cronenberg	FDP
North Rhine-Westphalia	List		Klaus Gärtner	FDP
North Rhine-Westphalia	List		Hans H. Gattermann	FDP
North Rhine-Westphalia	List		Hans-Dietrich Genscher	FDP
North Rhine-Westphalia	List		Burkhard Hirsch	FDP
North Rhine-Westphalia	List		Erwin Holsteg	FDP
North Rhine-Westphalia	List		Karl-Hans Laermann	FDP
North Rhine-Westphalia	List		Otto Graf Lambsdorff	FDP
North Rhine-Westphalia	List		Ingrid Matthäus-Maier (Note: Ingrid Matthäus-Maier resigned on 2 December 1982.)	FDP
North Rhine-Westphalia	List		Rolf Merker	FDP
North Rhine-Westphalia	List		Jürgen Möllemann	FDP
North Rhine-Westphalia	List		Friedhelm Rentrop	FDP
North Rhine-Westphalia	List		Horst-Ludwig Riemer	FDP
North Rhine-Westphalia	List		Irmgard Schwaetzer	FDP
North Rhine-Westphalia	List		Matthias Ginsberg (Note: Matthias Ginsberg took office on 9 December 1982, to succeed Ingrid Matthäus-Maier.)	FDP
Hesse	124	Waldeck	Rudi Walther	SPD
Hesse	125	Kassel	Horst Peter	SPD
Hesse	126	Werra-Meißner	Albert Nehm	SPD
Hesse	127	Schwalm-Eder	Heinz Kreutzmann	SPD
Hesse	128	Hersfeld	Wendelin Enders	SPD
Hesse	129	Marburg	Gerhard Jahn	SPD
Hesse	130	Lahn-Dill	Klaus Daubertshäuser	SPD
Hesse	131	Gießen	Erwin Horn	SPD
Hesse	132	Fulda	Alfred Dregger	CDU
Hesse	133	Hochtaunus	Manfred Langner	CDU
Hesse	134	Wetterau	Georg Schlaga	SPD
Hesse	135	Rheingau-Taunus – Limburg	Benno Erhard	CDU
Hesse	136	Wiesbaden	Rudi Schmitt	SPD
Hesse	137	Hanau	Bernd Reuter	SPD
Hesse	138	Frankfurt am Main I – Main-Taunus	Karsten Voigt	SPD
Hesse	139	Frankfurt am Main II	Fred Zander	SPD
Hesse	140	Frankfurt am Main III	Hans Matthöfer	SPD
Hesse	141	Groß-Gerau	Norbert Wieczorek	SPD
Hesse	142	Offenbach	Manfred Coppik	SPD
Hesse	143	Darmstadt	Helga Timm	SPD
Hesse	144	Odenwald	Heinrich Klein	SPD
Hesse	145	Bergstraße	Klaus Kübler	SPD
Hesse	List		Richard Bayha	CDU
Hesse	List		Wilfried Böhm	CDU
Hesse	List		Friedrich Bohl	CDU
Hesse	List		Erna-Maria Geier	CDU
Hesse	List		Lothar Haase	CDU
Hesse	List		Bernhard Jagoda	CDU
Hesse	List		Hans-Joachim Jentsch (Note: Hans-Joachim Jentsch resigned on 8 September 1982.)	CDU
Hesse	List		Carl Otto Lenz	CDU
Hesse	List		Christian Lenzer	CDU
Hesse	List		Helmut Link	CDU
Hesse	List		Gerhard O. Pfeffermann	CDU
Hesse	List		Walter Picard	CDU
Hesse	List		Heinz Riesenhuber	CDU
Hesse	List		Christian Schwarz-Schilling	CDU
Hesse	List		Dieter Weirich	CDU
Hesse	List		Otto Zink	CDU
Hesse	List		Karl Becker (Note: Karl Becker took office on 13 September 1982, to succeed Hans-Joachim Jentsch.)	CDU
Hesse	List		Klaus-Jürgen Hoffie (Note: Klaus-Jürgen Hoffie resigned on 25 June 1981.)	FDP
Hesse	List		Wolfgang Mischnick	FDP
Hesse	List		Andreas von Schoeler (Note: Andreas von Schoeler resigned on 8 December 1982.)	FDP
Hesse	List		Hermann Otto Solms	FDP
Hesse	List		Richard Wurbs	FDP
Hesse	List		Sibylle Engel (Note: Sibylle Engel took office on 26 June 1981, to succeed Klaus-Jürgen Hoffie.)	FDP
Hesse	List		Dietrich Riebensahm (Note: Dietrich Riebensahm took office on 13 December 1982, to succeed Andreas von Schoeler.)	FDP
Hesse	List		Georg Leber	SPD
Hesse	List		Dietrich Sperling	SPD
Hesse	List		Günther Wuttke	SPD
Rhineland-Palatinate	146	Neuwied	Heinz Schwarz	CDU
Rhineland-Palatinate	147	Ahrweiler	Karl Deres	CDU
Rhineland-Palatinate	148	Koblenz	Roswitha Verhülsdonk	CDU
Rhineland-Palatinate	149	Cochem	Waltrud Will-Feld	CDU
Rhineland-Palatinate	150	Kreuznach	Günther Leonhart	SPD
Rhineland-Palatinate	151	Bitburg	Alois Mertes	CDU
Rhineland-Palatinate	152	Trier	Günther Schartz	CDU
Rhineland-Palatinate	153	Montabaur	August Hanz	CDU
Rhineland-Palatinate	154	Mainz	Hugo Brandt	SPD
Rhineland-Palatinate	155	Worms	Gernot Fischer	SPD
Rhineland-Palatinate	156	Frankenthal	Horst Sielaff	SPD
Rhineland-Palatinate	157	Ludwigshafen	Hans Bardens	SPD
Rhineland-Palatinate	158	Neustadt – Speyer	Theo Magin	CDU
Rhineland-Palatinate	159	Kaiserslautern	Adolf Müller-Emmert	SPD
Rhineland-Palatinate	160	Pirmasens	Werner Marx	CDU
Rhineland-Palatinate	161	Landau	Heiner Geißler	CDU
Rhineland-Palatinate	List		Peter Büchner	SPD
Rhineland-Palatinate	List		Hugo Collet	SPD
Rhineland-Palatinate	List		Klaus von Dohnanyi (Note: Klaus von Dohnanyi resigned on 26 June 1981.)	SPD
Rhineland-Palatinate	List		Karl Haehser	SPD
Rhineland-Palatinate	List		Ralph Herberholz	SPD
Rhineland-Palatinate	List		Klaus Immer	SPD
Rhineland-Palatinate	List		Gunter Pauli	SPD
Rhineland-Palatinate	List		Gudrun Weyel	SPD
Rhineland-Palatinate	List		Hans Wallow (Note: Hans Wallow took office on 29 June 1981, to succeed Klaus von Dohnanyi.)	SPD
Rhineland-Palatinate	List		Norbert Blüm (Note: Norbert Blüm resigned on 15 June 1981.)	CDU
Rhineland-Palatinate	List		Johannes Gerster	CDU
Rhineland-Palatinate	List		Helmut Kohl	CDU
Rhineland-Palatinate	List		Elmar Pieroth (Note: Elmar Pieroth resigned on 16 July 1981.)	CDU
Rhineland-Palatinate	List		Werner Weiß	CDU
Rhineland-Palatinate	List		Markus Berger (Note: Markus Berger took office on 19 June 1981, to succeed Norbert Blüm.)	CDU
Rhineland-Palatinate	List		Hansjürgen Doss (Note: Hansjürgen Doss took office on 19 July 1981, to succeed Elmar Pieroth.)	CDU
Rhineland-Palatinate	List		Kurt Jung	FDP
Rhineland-Palatinate	List		Wolfgang Rumpf	FDP
Rhineland-Palatinate	List		Helmut Schäfer	FDP
Baden-Württemberg	162	Stuttgart-Süd	Roland Sauer	CDU
Baden-Württemberg	163	Stuttgart-Nord	Peter Conradi	SPD
Baden-Württemberg	164	Böblingen	Peter Petersen	CDU
Baden-Württemberg	165	Esslingen	Volker Hauff	SPD
Baden-Württemberg	166	Nürtingen	Anton Stark	CDU
Baden-Württemberg	167	Göppingen	Manfred Wörner	CDU
Baden-Württemberg	168	Waiblingen	Paul Laufs	CDU
Baden-Württemberg	169	Ludwigsburg	Matthias Wissmann	CDU
Baden-Württemberg	170	Neckar-Zaber	Renate Hellwig	CDU
Baden-Württemberg	171	Heilbronn	Egon Susset	CDU
Baden-Württemberg	172	Schwäbisch Hall	Philipp Jenninger	CDU
Baden-Württemberg	173	Backnang – Schwäbisch Gmünd	Dieter Schulte	CDU
Baden-Württemberg	174	Aalen – Heidenheim	Manfred Abelein	CDU
Baden-Württemberg	175	Karlsruhe-Stadt	Peter Corterier	SPD
Baden-Württemberg	176	Karlsruhe-Land	Klaus Bühler	CDU
Baden-Württemberg	177	Rastatt	Bernhard Friedmann	CDU
Baden-Württemberg	178	Heidelberg	Hartmut Soell	SPD
Baden-Württemberg	179	Mannheim I	Werner Nagel	SPD
Baden-Württemberg	180	Mannheim II	Hans Georg Schachtschabel	SPD
Baden-Württemberg	181	Odenwald – Tauber	Karl Miltner	CDU
Baden-Württemberg	182	Rhein-Neckar	Alfred Hubertus Neuhaus	CDU
Baden-Württemberg	183	Pforzheim	Lutz Stavenhagen	CDU
Baden-Württemberg	184	Calw	Haimo George	CDU
Baden-Württemberg	185	Freiburg	Conrad Schroeder	CDU
Baden-Württemberg	186	Lörrach – Müllheim	Wilhelm Jung	CDU
Baden-Württemberg	187	Emmendingen – Lahr	Albert Burger (Note: Albert Burger died on 10 October 1981.)	CDU
Baden-Württemberg	188	Offenburg	Wolfgang Schäuble	CDU
Baden-Württemberg	189	Rottweil	Franz Sauter	CDU
Baden-Württemberg	190	Schwarzwald-Baar	Hansjörg Häfele	CDU
Baden-Württemberg	191	Konstanz	Hans-Peter Repnik	CDU
Baden-Württemberg	192	Waldshut	Werner Dörflinger	CDU
Baden-Württemberg	193	Reutlingen	Anton Pfeifer	CDU
Baden-Württemberg	194	Tübingen	Jürgen Todenhöfer	CDU
Baden-Württemberg	195	Ulm	Herbert Werner	CDU
Baden-Württemberg	196	Biberach	Alois Graf von Waldburg-Zeil	CDU
Baden-Württemberg	197	Ravensburg – Bodensee	Claus Jäger	CDU
Baden-Württemberg	198	Zollernalb – Sigmaringen	Hermann Schwörer	CDU
Baden-Württemberg	List		Robert Antretter	SPD
Baden-Württemberg	List		Dieter Auch	SPD
Baden-Württemberg	List		Rudolf Bindig	SPD
Baden-Württemberg	List		Rolf Böhme (Note: Rolf Böhme resigned on 2 December 1982.)	SPD
Baden-Württemberg	List		Andreas von Bülow	SPD
Baden-Württemberg	List		Herta Däubler-Gmelin	SPD
Baden-Württemberg	List		Fritz-Joachim Gnädinger	SPD
Baden-Württemberg	List		Ernst Haar	SPD
Baden-Württemberg	List		Liesel Hartenstein	SPD
Baden-Württemberg	List		Gunter Huonker	SPD
Baden-Württemberg	List		Klaus Kirschner	SPD
Baden-Württemberg	List		Renate Lepsius	SPD
Baden-Württemberg	List		Rainer Offergeld	SPD
Baden-Württemberg	List		Klaus-Dieter Osswald	SPD
Baden-Württemberg	List		Heinz Rapp	SPD
Baden-Württemberg	List		Wolfgang Roth	SPD
Baden-Württemberg	List		Harald B. Schäfer	SPD
Baden-Württemberg	List		Hermann Scheer	SPD
Baden-Württemberg	List		Dieter Spöri	SPD
Baden-Württemberg	List		Gert Weisskirchen	SPD
Baden-Württemberg	List		Ruth Zutt	SPD
Baden-Württemberg	List		Brigitte Erler (Note: Brigitte Erler took office on 6 December 1982, to succeed Rolf Böhme.)	SPD
Baden-Württemberg	List		Wolfram Bergerowski	FDP
Baden-Württemberg	List		Guido Brunner (Note: Guido Brunner resigned on 28 January 1981.)	FDP
Baden-Württemberg	List		Rita Fromm	FDP
Baden-Württemberg	List		Georg Gallus	FDP
Baden-Württemberg	List		Martin Grüner	FDP
Baden-Württemberg	List		Helmut Haussmann	FDP
Baden-Württemberg	List		Friedrich Hölscher	FDP
Baden-Württemberg	List		Klaus Rösch	FDP
Baden-Württemberg	List		Manfred Vohrer	FDP
Baden-Württemberg	List		Olaf Feldmann (Note: Olaf Feldmann took office on 29 January 1981, to succeed Guido Brunner.)	FDP
Baden-Württemberg	List		Josef Bugl	CDU
Baden-Württemberg	List		Herbert Czaja	CDU
Baden-Württemberg	List		Elmar Kolb	CDU
Baden-Württemberg	List		Rudolf Ruf	CDU
Baden-Württemberg	List		Roswitha Wisniewski	CDU
Baden-Württemberg	List		Honor Funk (Note: Honor Funk took office on 16 October 1981, to succeed Albert Burger.)	CDU
Bavaria	199	Altötting	Karl-Heinz Spilker	CSU
Bavaria	200	Freising	Albert Probst	CSU
Bavaria	201	Fürstenfeldbruck	Eicke Götz (Note: Eicke Götz resigned on 8 March 1983.)	CSU
Bavaria	202	Ingolstadt	Horst Seehofer	CSU
Bavaria	203	Munich Centre	Manfred Schmidt	SPD
Bavaria	204	Munich North	Hans-Jochen Vogel	SPD
Bavaria	205	Munich East	Rudolf Kraus	CSU
Bavaria	206	Munich South	Erich Riedl	CSU
Bavaria	207	Munich West	Kurt Faltlhauser	CSU
Bavaria	208	Munich Land	Josef Linsmeier	CSU
Bavaria	209	Rosenheim	Hans Graf Huyn	CSU
Bavaria	210	Starnberg	Franz-Ludwig Schenk Graf von Stauffenberg	CSU
Bavaria	211	Traunstein	Matthias Engelsberger	CSU
Bavaria	212	Weilheim	Vacant (Note: Member-elect Franz Josef Strauss (CSU) declined to take office.)	
Bavaria	213	Deggendorf	Franz Handlos	CSU
Bavaria	214	Landshut	Friedrich Zimmermann	CSU
Bavaria	215	Passau	Klaus Rose	CSU
Bavaria	216	Rottal-Inn	Günther Müller	CSU
Bavaria	217	Straubing	Alois Rainer	CSU
Bavaria	218	Amberg	Hermann Fellner	CSU
Bavaria	219	Regensburg	Benno Zierer	CSU
Bavaria	220	Schwandorf	Dionys Jobst	CSU
Bavaria	221	Weiden	Max Kunz	CSU
Bavaria	222	Bamberg	Paul Röhner (Note: Paul Röhner resigned on 11 May 1982.)	CSU
Bavaria	223	Bayreuth	Ortwin Lowack	CSU
Bavaria	224	Coburg	Otto Regenspurger	CSU
Bavaria	225	Hof	Hans Büchler	SPD
Bavaria	226	Kulmbach	Lorenz Niegel	CSU
Bavaria	227	Ansbach	Carl-Dieter Spranger	CSU
Bavaria	228	Erlangen	Klaus Hartmann	CSU
Bavaria	229	Fürth	Werner Dollinger	CSU
Bavaria	230	Nuremberg North	Renate Schmidt	SPD
Bavaria	231	Nuremberg South	Egon Lutz	SPD
Bavaria	232	Roth	Richard Stücklen	CSU
Bavaria	233	Aschaffenburg	Paul Gerlach	CSU
Bavaria	234	Bad Kissingen	Eduard Lintner	CSU
Bavaria	235	Main-Spessart	Alfred Biehle	CSU
Bavaria	236	Schweinfurt	Michael Glos	CSU
Bavaria	237	Würzburg	Wolfgang Bötsch	CSU
Bavaria	238	Augsburg-Stadt	Stefan Höpfinger	CSU
Bavaria	239	Augsburg-Land	Walter Althammer	CSU
Bavaria	240	Donau-Ries	Karl Heinz Lemmrich	CSU
Bavaria	241	Neu-Ulm	Theo Waigel	CSU
Bavaria	242	Oberallgäu	Ignaz Kiechle	CSU
Bavaria	243	Ostallgäu	Kurt Rossmanith	CSU
Bavaria	List		Max Amling	SPD
Bavaria	List		Peter Feile	SPD
Bavaria	List		Friedrich Gerstl	SPD
Bavaria	List		Dieter Haack	SPD
Bavaria	List		Horst Haase	SPD
Bavaria	List		Karl Hofmann	SPD
Bavaria	List		Walter Kolbow	SPD
Bavaria	List		Uwe Lambinus	SPD
Bavaria	List		Manfred Marschall	SPD
Bavaria	List		Anke Martiny-Glotz	SPD
Bavaria	List		Richard Müller	SPD
Bavaria	List		Rudolf Müller	SPD
Bavaria	List		Konrad Porzner (Note: Konrad Porzner resigned on 28 January 1981.)	SPD
Bavaria	List		Philip Rosenthal	SPD
Bavaria	List		Hermann Schätz	SPD
Bavaria	List		Rudolf Schöfberger	SPD
Bavaria	List		Wolfgang Sieler	SPD
Bavaria	List		Sigrid Skarpelis-Sperk	SPD
Bavaria	List		Ludwig Stiegler	SPD
Bavaria	List		Wilhelm Stöckl	SPD
Bavaria	List		Karl Weinhofer	SPD
Bavaria	List		Axel Wernitz	SPD
Bavaria	List		Hermann Wimmer	SPD
Bavaria	List		Manfred Wimmer	SPD
Bavaria	List		Hans de With	SPD
Bavaria	List		Georg Bamberg (Note: Georg Bamberg took office on 2 February 1981, to succeed Konrad Porzner.)	SPD
Bavaria	List		Kurt Ueberschär (Note: Kurt Ueberschär took office on 2 February 1981, to succeed Hans-Jochen Vogel.)	SPD
Bavaria	List		Michaela Geiger	CSU
Bavaria	List		Ernst Hinsken	CSU
Bavaria	List		Peter Wilhelm Höffkes	CSU
Bavaria	List		Peter Keller	CSU
Bavaria	List		Hans Klein	CSU
Bavaria	List		Reinhold Kreile	CSU
Bavaria	List		Ursula Krone-Appuhn	CSU
Bavaria	List		Alfred Sauter	CSU
Bavaria	List		Oscar Schneider	CSU
Bavaria	List		Friedrich Voss	CSU
Bavaria	List		Jürgen Warnke	CSU
Bavaria	List		Fritz Wittmann	CSU
Bavaria	List		Josef Brunner (Note: Josef Brunner took office after member-elect Franz Josef Strauss declined to take office.)	CSU
Bavaria	List		Ekkehard Voigt (Note: Ekkehard Voigt took office on 14 May 1982, to succeed Paul Röhner.)	CSU
Bavaria	List		Ursula Männle (Note: Ursula Männle took office on 17 March 1983, to succeed Eicke Götz.)	CSU
Bavaria	List		Norbert Eimer	FDP
Bavaria	List		Hans A. Engelhard	FDP
Bavaria	List		Josef Ertl	FDP
Bavaria	List		Hildegard Hamm-Brücher	FDP
Bavaria	List		Hans Paintner	FDP
Bavaria	List		Karl-Heinz Popp	FDP
Bavaria	List		Hansheinrich Schmidt	FDP
Saarland	244	Saarbrücken I	Hajo Hoffmann	SPD
Saarland	245	Saarbrücken II	Alwin Brück	SPD
Saarland	246	Saarlouis	Hans-Werner Müller	CDU
Saarland	247	St. Wendel	Johannes Ganz	CDU
Saarland	248	Homburg	Lothar Fischer	SPD
Saarland	List		Franz Josef Conrad	CDU
Saarland	List		Doris Pack	CDU
Saarland	List		Ottmar Schreiner	SPD
West Berlin			Franz Amrehn (Note: Franz Amrehn died on 4 October 1981.)	CDU
West Berlin			Dietrich Bahner	CDU
West Berlin			Lieselotte Berger	CDU
West Berlin			Eberhard Diepgen (Note: Eberhard Diepgen resigned on 3 February 1981.)	CDU
West Berlin			Wolfgang Hackel	CDU
West Berlin			Joachim Kalisch	CDU
West Berlin			Peter Kittelmann	CDU
West Berlin			Gerhard Kunz (Note: Gerhard Kunz resigned on 15 June 1981.)	CDU
West Berlin			Peter Lorenz	CDU
West Berlin			Günter Straßmeir	CDU
West Berlin			Richard von Weizsäcker (Note: Richard von Weizsäcker resigned on 15 June 1981.)	CDU
West Berlin			Gerhard Schulze (Note: Gerhard Schulze took office on 4 February 1981, to succeed Eberhard Diepgen.)	CDU
West Berlin			Helmut Buschbom (Note: Helmut Buschbom took office on 16 June 1981, to succeed Gerhard Kunz.)	CDU
West Berlin			Werner Dolata (Note: Werner Dolata took office on 16 June 1981, to succeed Richard von Weizsäcker.)	CDU
West Berlin			Peter Boroffka (Note: Peter Boroffka took office on 6 October 1981, to succeed Franz Amrehn.)	CDU
West Berlin			Nils Diederich	SPD
West Berlin			Ulrich Dübber	SPD
West Berlin			Jürgen Egert	SPD
West Berlin			Horst Korber (Note: Horst Korber died on 2 July 1981.)	SPD
West Berlin			Lothar Löffler	SPD
West Berlin			Dagmar Luuk	SPD
West Berlin			Peter Männing	SPD
West Berlin			Peter Mitzscherling	SPD
West Berlin			Marie Schlei (Note: Marie Schlei resigned on 3 November 1981.)	SPD
West Berlin			Gerd Wartenberg	SPD
West Berlin			Reinhard Bühling (Note: Reinhard Bühling took office on 6 July 1981, to succeed Horst Korber.)	SPD
West Berlin			Rüdiger Hitzigrath (Note: Rüdiger Hitzigrath took office on 6 November 1981, to succeed Marie Schlei.)	SPD
West Berlin			Hans-Günter Hoppe	FDP

== See also ==
- Politics of Germany
- List of Bundestag Members
