= Josef Göppel =

German politician (1950–2022)

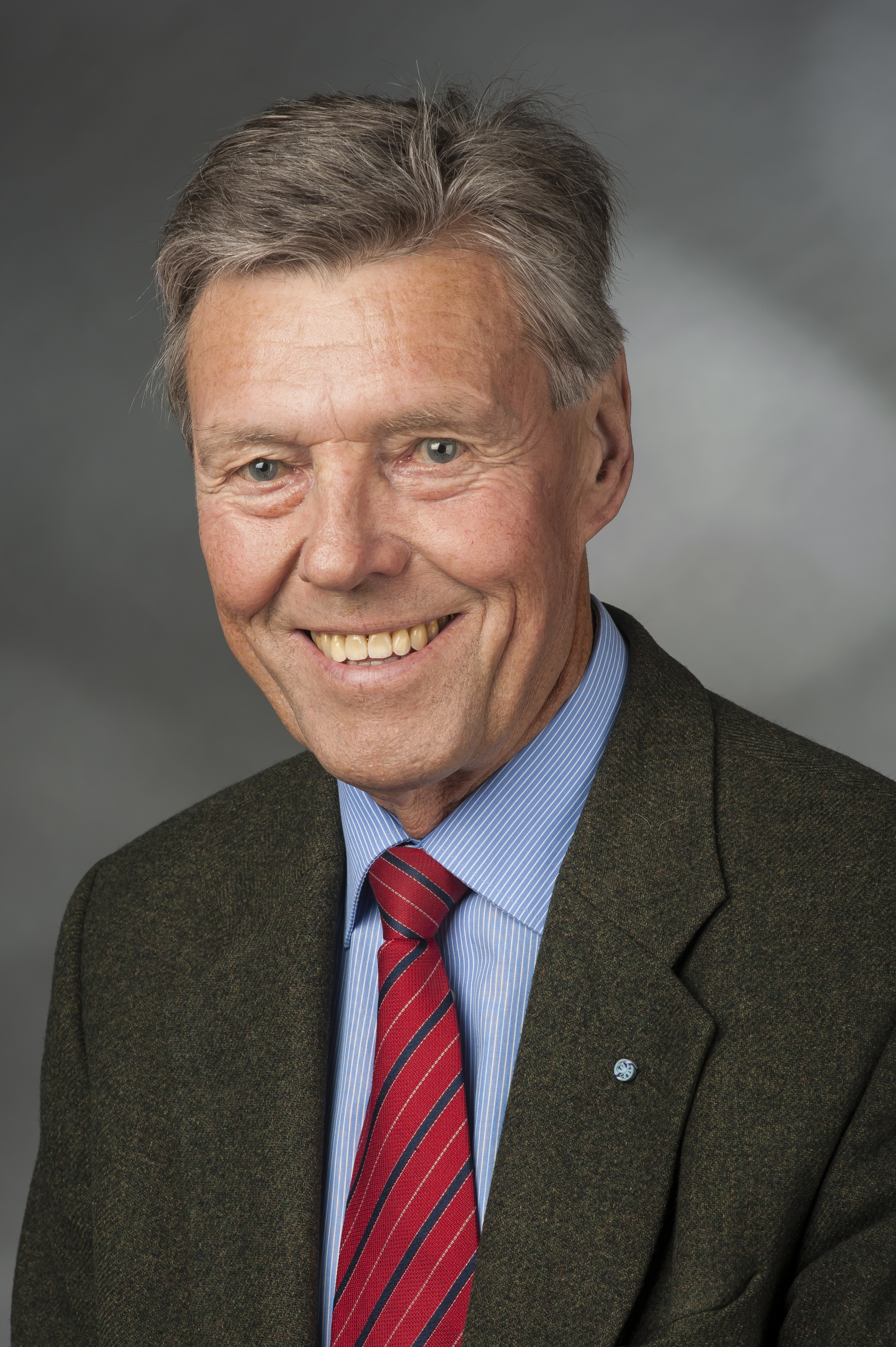
- Göppel in 2014

Member of the Bundestag; for Ansbach
- In office 17 October 2002 – 24 October 2017
- Preceded by: Carl-Dieter Spranger
- Succeeded by: Artur Auernhammer

Member of the Landtag of Bavaria; for Ansbach South
- In office 20 October 1994 – 31 October 2002
- Preceded by: Friedrich Bauereisen
- Succeeded by: Christa Götz

Personal details
- Born: 16 August 1950 Herrieden, West Germany
- Died: 13 April 2022 (aged 71)
- Party: Christian Social Union
- Children: 4

Josef Göppel (16 August 1950 – 13 April 2022) was a German politician. Born in Herrieden, Bavaria, he represented the CSU. He served as a member of the Bundestag from the state of Bavaria from 2002 till 2017.
