= Auernhammer =

Auernhammer is a German surname. Notable people with the surname include:

- Artur Auernhammer (born 1963), German politician
- Josepha Barbara Auernhammer (1758–1820), Austrian pianist and composer
