= Ursula Männle =

German academic and politician

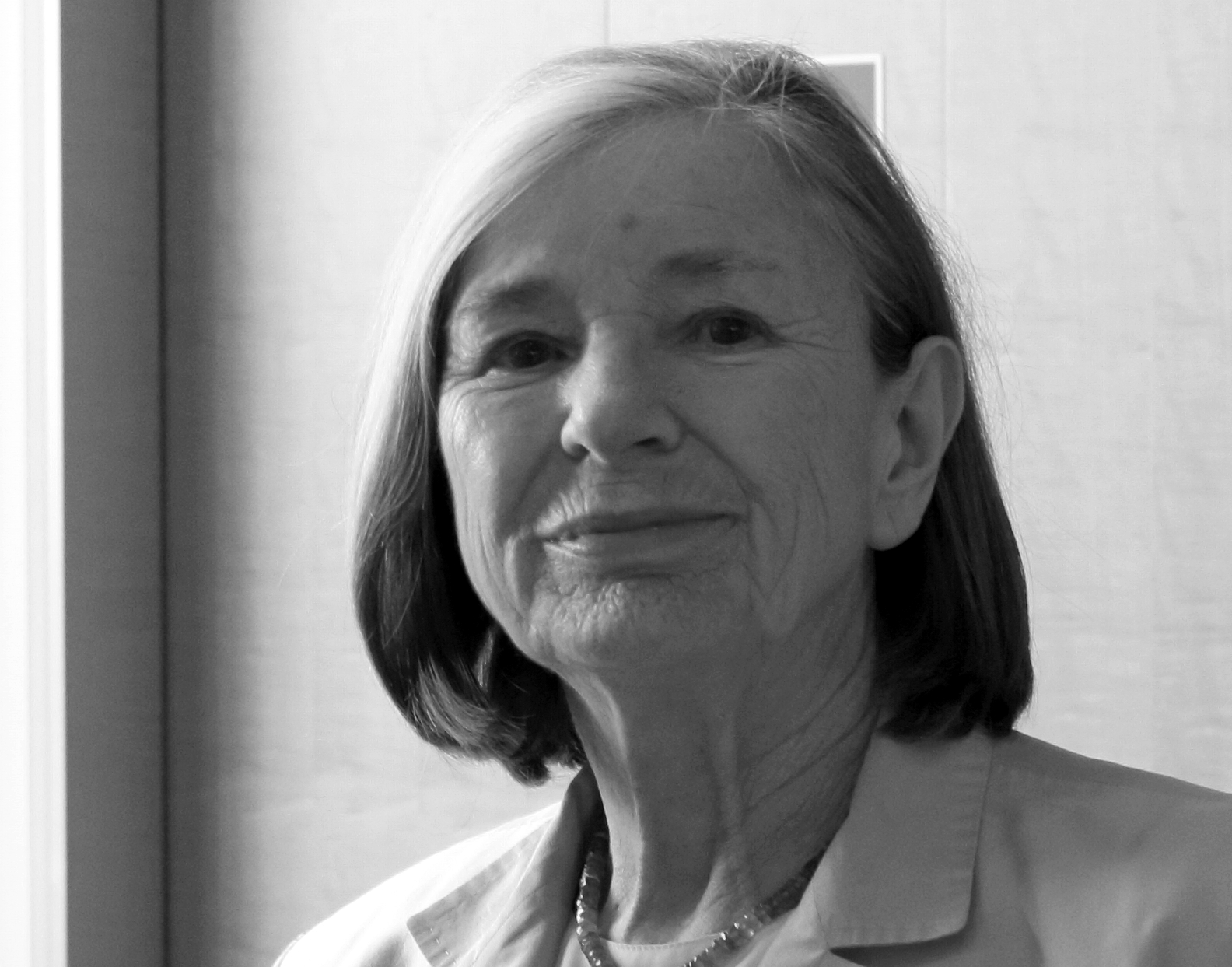
Männle in 2015, photo by Henning Schlottmann

Ursula Männle (born 7 January 1944) is a German Social sciences academic and politician (CSU). She served between 1983 and 1994 as Member of the Bundestag (national parliament). Between 2000 and 2013, she was a member of the Bavarian Landtag (regional parliament), chairing an important parliamentary committee and, till 2009, chairing the women's working group in the Landtag.

== Biography ==
=== Provenance and early years ===
Ursula Käthe Männle was born into a Catholic family in Ludwigshafen which till 1946 was still part of Bavaria's western province. In 1949, her family moved to Munich which meant a "return" to Bavaria: it is in Bavaria that she grew up and has built her academic and political career.

In 1964, she graduated from senior school and moved on to study Political sciences, sociology and modern history at LMU Munich and, subsequently, the University of Regensburg. Between 1970 and 1976, she was employed as a research assistant at the Akademie für Politische Bildung ("Academy for Political Education and Training"), on the western shore of the Starnberger See, roughly equidistant between Munich and Garmisch.

In 1976, she joined the Katholische Stiftungshochschule München (loosely "Catholic Foundation [Social Science and Welfare] Academy")]] as a professor at the Benediktbeuern site. She remained professionally involved with the academy till 2009.

=== Politics ===
Ursula Männle became a member of the centre-right CSU (Bavarian political party) in 1964. During 1966/67 she served as regional president of the Ring Christlich-Demokratischer Studenten ("Association of Christian Democratic Students" / RCDS). Between 1973 and 1977 Männle was deputy chair of the "Junge Union" (JU), the youth wing of West Germany's centre-right CDU and CSU parties. Then, between 1981 and 1991, she was regional chair of the Frauen-Union der CSU (CSU's Women's Union).

In 1973 she became a member of the CSU regional executive, serving between 1987 and 2007 as a member of the party presidium.

She first stood as a candidate for election to the Bundestag (national parliament) in 1972, but she was included only at place 30 on the party list, and was not elected. On 4 October 1979 she became a member of the Bundestag (national parliament), taking the seat vacated through the sudden death, two days earlier, of her party colleague Heinrich Reichold. In the parliament, families policy became a particular focus for her interests. She was not re-elected in 1980, but for a second time inherited the seat vacated by a colleague. On 17 March 1983 she took over the seat that had been made available through the resignation (resulting from disagreement over the party's attitude to the legacy of the Holocaust) of Eicke Götz. This time she remained a Bundestag member without further interruption till 1994. Between 1986 and 1994 she chaired the assembly's CDU/CSU women's group.

Between 1994 and 1998 Männle served as the appointed Bavarian government's Minister of State ("Staatsministerin") for Federal Affairs (... "für Bundesangelegenheiten").

Between 2000 and 2013 Ursula Männle represented the Starnberg electoral district as a deputy in the Bavarian Landtag (regional parliament). During this time she was chair of the Landtag committee on Federal and European Affairs and a member of the Committee on Religion. She was a member of the leadership team (Vorstandsmitglied) of the CSU group in the assembly. Till 14 January 2009 she chaired the women's working group in the Landtag. Also, between 2016 and 2018, she represented the CSU on the 28 member executive of the political network organisation Europäische Bewegung Deutschland.

=== Continuing political involvement ===
In May 2014 Männle succeeded Hans Zehetmair as chair of the Hanns Seidel Foundation, a political research organisation closely aligned with the CSU, created in 1966 as a distinctively Bavarian version of the older Konrad Adenauer Foundation. It was reported that she been had proposed for the post by the party leader Horst Seehofer. Having served as deputy chair for twenty years, she was something of an insider candidate. Nevertheless, she was the first woman in the foundation's history ever to take on the top position. Her re-election for a further term was reported in August 2018. However, at the end of March 2019, press reports emerged of a planned radical shake-up of the foundation, reflective of a power-shift to a younger generation, and intended to appeal to younger voters, which would involve Männle stepping down, to be replaced as chair by her deputy, Markus Ferber.

== Publications (selection) ==
- Kleine Fibel für die politische Praxis. Beck, München 1974, ISBN 3-406-05409-9, with Eckard Colberg.
- Zur Geschäftsordnung: Die Praxis der Willensbildung. Bayerische Landeszentrale für politische Bildungsarbeit, 1977 (4th edition).
- Die gestaltende Rolle der Frau im 21. Jahrhundert. hss, 1999, ISBN 3-88795-194-8.
