= Matthias Ginsberg =

German politician

Member of the Bundestag
- In office 9 December 1982 – 29 March 1983

Personal details
- Born: 13 July 1949 Hamburg
- Party: FDP

Matthias Ginsberg (13 July 1949) was a German politician of the Free Democratic Party (FDP) and former member of the German Bundestag.

== Life ==
Ginsberg moved to the German Bundestag on 9 December 1982. He replaced the mandate of Ingrid Matthäus-Maier.

== Literature ==
Herbst, Ludolf; Jahn, Bruno (2002). Vierhaus, Rudolf (ed.). Biographisches Handbuch der Mitglieder des Deutschen Bundestages. 1949–2002 [Biographical Handbook of the Members of the German Bundestag. 1949–2002] (in German). München: De Gruyter - De Gruyter Saur. p. 1715. ISBN 978-3-11-184511-1.
