= Alwin Brück =

German politician (1931–2020)

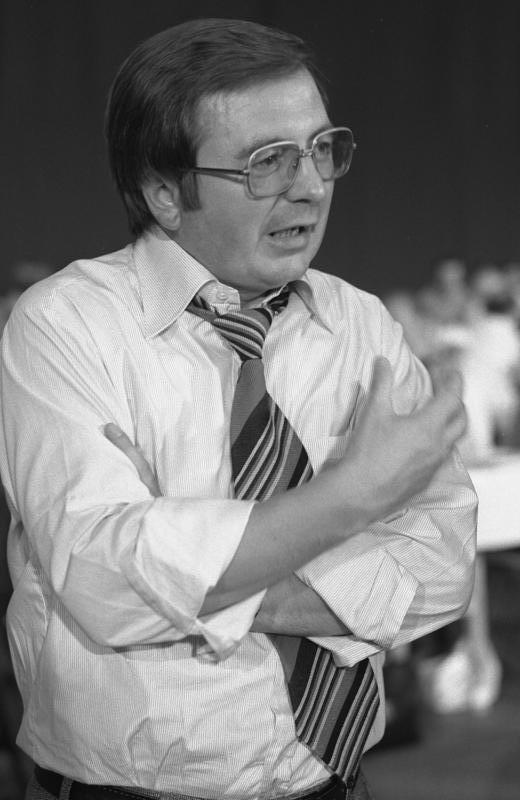
- Brück in 1976

Deputy of the Bundestag
- In office 19 October 1965 – 19 October 1969

Substitute Member of the Parliamentary Assembly of the Council of Europe
- In office 29 January 1969 – 1 January 1970

Personal details
- Born: 23 September 1931 Heusweiler, Territory of the Saar Basin
- Died: 14 February 2020 (aged 88)
- Party: SPD
- Occupation: Politician

Alwin Brück (23 September 1931 – 14 February 2020) was a German politician who was a member of the Social Democratic Party of Germany (SPD). He was Parliamentary Secretary of the Federal Ministry of Economic Cooperation and Development from 1974 to 1982.

== Biography ==
In 1947, Brück joined the Socialist Youth of Germany – Falcons. He was regional president of the Falcons in Saarland from 1956 to 1967. He volunteered at Saar-Volksstimme from 1949 to 1951, and then worked as an editorial consultant until 1953. In 1955, he began working at Saarbrücker Allgemeine Zeitung, where he became an assistant editor. In 1952, Brück assisted in the foundation of the DSP, which did not reach Saarland until 1955. In 1960, he became a member of the executive committee of the DSP in Saarland. From 1960 to 1973, Brück served as a member of the municipal council of his hometown, Heusweiler. From 1965 to 1990, he was a member of the Bundestag. In the Bundestag, he was President of the Economic Cooperation Committee from 1969 to 1974. In May 1974, he became Parliamentary State Secretary of the Economic Cooperation Committee under the appointment of Chancellor Helmut Schmidt. After the election of Helmut Kohl, Brück left the federal government in 1982. In 1987, Brück was elected to the Bundestag with 46.4% of the vote, representing Saarbrücken.

Brück died on 14 February 2020 at the age of 88.

== Honors ==
- Saarland Order of Merit (1976)
- Honorary Senator at Saarland University (1981)
