= Hans-Joachim Jentsch =

German judge and politician (1937–2021)

Justice of the Federal Constitutional Court of Germany
- In office 3 May 1996 – 28 September 2005
- Nominated by: CDU/CSU
- Preceded by: Hans Hugo Klein
- Succeeded by: Herbert Landau

Minister for Justice of Thuringia
- In office 8 November 1990 – 30 November 1994
- Minister-President: Josef Duchač; Bernhard Vogel
- Preceded by: Ralph Liebler (1952)
- Succeeded by: Otto Kretschmer

Member of the Landtag of Hesse
- In office 5 April 1987 – 19 November 1990
- Preceded by: Multi-member district
- Succeeded by: Hans-Jürgen Irmer
- Constituency: State list

Mayor of Wiesbaden
- In office 1982–1985
- Preceded by: Georg-Berndt Oschatz
- Succeeded by: Achim Exner

Member of the Bundestag; from Hesse
- In office 14 December 1976 – 8 September 1982
- Preceded by: Multi-member district
- Succeeded by: Karl Becker
- Constituency: State list

Personal details
- Born: 20 September 1937 Fürstenwalde, Germany
- Died: 28 March 2021 (aged 83) Wiesbaden, Germany
- Resting place: South Cemetery Wiesbaden
- Party: Christian Democratic Union
- Spouse: Doris Beinhoff (m. 1965)
- Children: 1
- Education: Marburg University

Hans-Joachim Jentsch (September 20, 1937 – March 28, 2021) was a German lawyer and politician (CDU). He was a member of the German Bundestag from 1976 to 1982, mayor of Wiesbaden – the capital of Hesse – from 1982 to 1985, a member of the Landtag of Hesse from 1987 to 1990, minister of justice in Thuringia from 1990 to 1994, and a justice of the Federal Constitutional Court from 1996 to 2005.

== Biography ==
After passing the Second State Examination in 1966, Jentsch received his doctorate in Marburg with a thesis titled Die Beurteilung summarischer Exekutionen durch das Völkerrecht. In the same year he was admitted to the bar and practiced in Wiesbaden. In 1977, he was also appointed as a notary public. Both licenses were suspended during his activities as mayor, minister and constitutional judge.

Hans-Joachim Jentsch was married, had an adult daughter and last lived in Wiesbaden. He died in March 2021 at the age of 83.

== Member of Parliament ==
Jentsch was a member of the German Bundestag from December 14, 1976, to September 8, 1982. He belonged to the Landtag of Hesse in its 12th legislative period. He succeeded Otti Geschka, who had been appointed state secretary, in the state parliament on April 27, 1987, but resigned his seat on November 19, 1990, to take up his ministerial post in the Thuringian state government.

== Public offices ==
In 1982, Jentsch was elected mayor of Wiesbaden by the city council. After the 1985 Hessian municipal elections, he was prematurely recalled from office by the city council due to a change in majority.

After German reunification, Jentsch joined the first state government of the restored state of Thuringia on November 8, 1990, as Thuringia's Minister of Justice. From June 18, 1991, to February 11, 1992, his portfolio bore the name "Thuringian Ministry of Justice, Federal and European Affairs." On November 30, 1994, Jentsch resigned from the state government as a result of the formation of a new government following the 1994 state elections. From 1995 to 1996, Jentsch served as a member of the Thuringian Constitutional Court.

From October 1994, he was a lecturer at the Faculty of Law at Friedrich Schiller University in Jena. In September 2004, the Thuringian Minister of Culture appointed him honorary professor.

== Justice of the Federal Constitutional Court ==
From May 3, 1996, until his retirement on September 28, 2005, Jentsch was a member of the Second Senate of the Federal Constitutional Court, most recently acting as rapporteur in party prohibition and election review proceedings, as well as in party and election law proceedings. He was considered the most "political" justice of the Federal Constitutional Court in his time.

As rapporteur, he played a leading role in the decisions of the Federal Constitutional Court on the NPD ban proceedings of March 18, 2003, on the junior professorship of July 27, 2004, and on the dissolution of the 15th German Bundestag following the vote of confidence of August 25, 2005 ("Confidence Question II"). In the headscarf ruling, Jentsch was a member of the minority and, together with Judges Udo Di Fabio and Rudolf Mellinghoff, voted against the teacher's constitutional complaint and thus in favor of the Higher Education Authority of Baden-Württemberg, based on the principle of the neutrality of schools and the headscarf as a political symbol. In the decision of the Federal Constitutional Court of August 25, 2005, on the dissolution of the 15th German Bundestag, he was the only judge not to take the view of the Senate majority. Jentsch justified his special vote by arguing that the dissolution of the Bundestag through a "constructed lack of confidence" would lead to a right of the Bundestag to dissolve itself, which is deliberately not provided for in the Basic Law, if the justification were based solely on the Chancellor's assessment of the situation.

== Honors ==
In July 2002, the Faculty of Law at Friedrich Schiller University in Jena awarded Hans-Joachim Jentsch an honorary doctorate "for his academic achievements in the field of constitutional and constitutional law and his special services to the polity and to legal and constitutional development in Germany." In 2005, he was awarded the Grand Cross of Merit with Star and Shoulder Ribbon of the Order of Merit of the Federal Republic of Germany.

By resolution of September 21, 2006, he was awarded honorary citizenship of the city of Wiesbaden. The Prime Minister of Hesse, Volker Bouffier, awarded Hans-Joachim Jentsch the Wilhelm Leuschner Medal for services to German unity on November 5, 2010.
