= Friedrich Bauereisen =

German politician (1895–1965)

Member of the Bundestag; for Ansbach
- In office 7 September 1949 – 17 October 1961
- Preceded by: Constituency established
- Succeeded by: Georg Ehnes

Personal details
- Born: 9 December 1895 Ehingen, Middle Franconia, Germany
- Died: 14 January 1965 (aged 69) Ehingen, Middle Franconia, West Germany
- Party: Christian Social Union

Friedrich Bauereisen (9 December 1895 – 14 January 1965) was a German politician of the Christian Social Union in Bavaria (CSU) and former member of the German Bundestag.

== Life ==
Bauereisen joined the CSU in 1946 after not having been politically active before 1945. From 1948, Bauereisen was a member of the district council in the district of Dinkelsbühl. He was a member of the German Bundestag from its first election in 1949 to 1961. Bauereisen represented the Ansbach constituency in parliament.

== Literature ==
Herbst, Ludolf; Jahn, Bruno (2002). Vierhaus, Rudolf (ed.). Biographisches Handbuch der Mitglieder des Deutschen Bundestages. 1949–2002 [Biographical Handbook of the Members of the German Bundestag. 1949–2002] (in German). München: De Gruyter - De Gruyter Saur. p. 1715. ISBN 978-3-11-184511-1.
