= Klaus Brunnstein =

German computer scientist (1937–2015)

Member of the Bundestag
- In office 11 February 1983 – 29 March 1983

Personal details
- Born: 25 May 1937 Köln
- Died: 19 May 2015 (aged 77)
- Party: FDP
- Occupation: computer scientist

Klaus Brunnstein (25 May 1937 – 19 May 2015) was a German computer scientist and politician of the Free Democratic Party (FDP) and former member of the German Bundestag.

== Life ==
Brunnstein was a member of the FDP until 1987. From 1980 to 1983 he was state chairman of the FDP in Hamburg, from 1981 to 1983 also a member of the FDP federal executive committee. Brunnstein was a member of the German Bundestag from February 1983, when he succeeded Helga Schuchardt, until the end of the parliamentary term in March of the same year.

== Literature ==
Herbst, Ludolf; Jahn, Bruno (2002). Vierhaus, Rudolf (ed.). Biographisches Handbuch der Mitglieder des Deutschen Bundestages. 1949–2002 [Biographical Handbook of the Members of the German Bundestag. 1949–2002] (in German). München: De Gruyter - De Gruyter Saur. p. 1715. ISBN 978-3-11-184511-1.
