= Georg Ehnes =

German politician

Member of the Bundestag; for Ansbach
- In office 17 October 1961 – 19 September 1972
- Preceded by: Friedrich Bauereisen
- Succeeded by: Otto Menth

Member of the Landtag of Bavaria; for Uffenheim, Rothenburg ob der Tauber
- In office 4 December 1958 – 9 October 1961
- Preceded by: Paul Nerreter
- Succeeded by: Heinrich Meier

Personal details
- Born: 27 September 1920 Wörnitz, Germany
- Died: 27 April 1991 (aged 70) Wörnitz, Germany
- Party: Christian Social Union

Georg Ehnes (27 September 1920 – 27 April 1991) is a German politician, representative of the Christian Social Union in Bavaria. He was a member of the Landtag of Bavaria.

== See also ==
- List of Bavarian Christian Social Union politicians
