= Peter Boroffka =

German politician (1932–1999)

Member of the Bundestag
- In office 6 October 1981 – 18 February 1987

Personal details
- Born: 14 May 1932 Potsdam
- Died: 24 December 1999 (aged 67)
- Party: CDU

Peter Boroffka (May 14, 1932 – December 24, 1999) was a German politician of the Christian Democratic Union (CDU) and former member of the German Bundestag.

== Life ==
Boroffka joined the CDU in 1960. From 1971 to 1985 Boroffka was a member of the Berlin House of Representatives. On 6 October 1981, he was sent to the German Bundestag as a Berlin member of parliament, succeeding Franz Amrehn. He resigned from the Bundestag in 1987.

== Literature ==
Herbst, Ludolf; Jahn, Bruno (2002). Vierhaus, Rudolf (ed.). Biographisches Handbuch der Mitglieder des Deutschen Bundestages. 1949–2002 [Biographical Handbook of the Members of the German Bundestag. 1949–2002] (in German). München: De Gruyter - De Gruyter Saur. p. 1715. ISBN 978-3-11-184511-1.
