= Carl-Dieter Spranger =

German politician (born 1939)

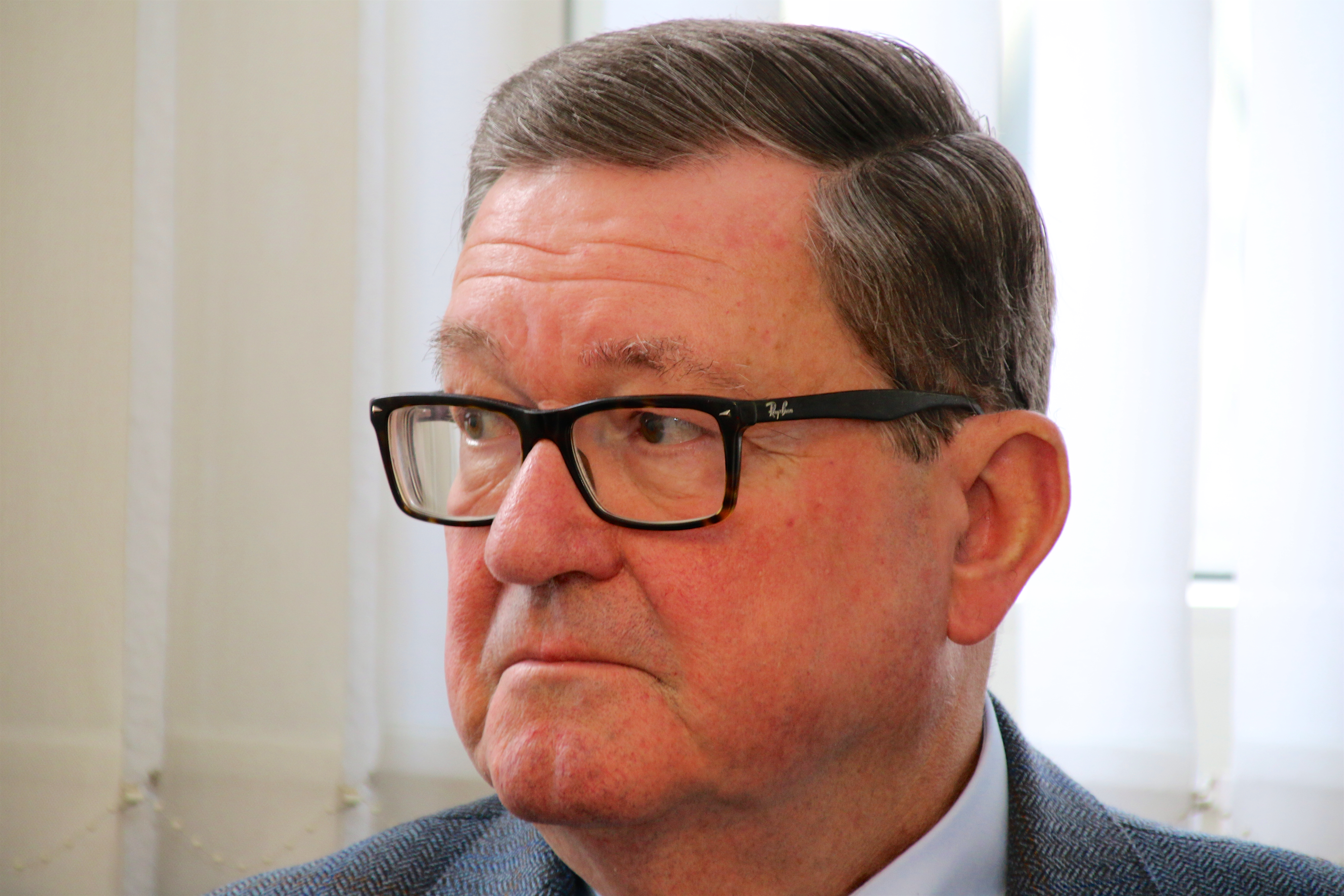
- Spranger in 2015

Minister of Economic Cooperation and Development
- In office 18 January 1991 – 26 October 1998
- Chancellor: Helmut Kohl
- Preceded by: Jürgen Warnke
- Succeeded by: Heidemarie Wieczorek-Zeul

Member of the Bundestag; for Ansbach
- In office 13 December 1972 – 17 October 2002
- Preceded by: Otto Menth
- Succeeded by: Josef Göppel

Personal details
- Born: 28 March 1939 (age 87) Leipzig, Germany
- Party: Christian Social Union
- Children: 3

Carl-Dieter Spranger (born 28 March 1939) is a German politician of the CSU.

He served as the Minister of Economic Cooperation and Development from 1991 to 1998. He is married and has three children.
