= Wolfram Bergerowski =

German politician

Member of the Bundestag
- In office 4 November 1980 – 29 March 1983

Personal details
- Born: 14 March 1936 Ludwigsburg
- Died: 2 June 2009 (aged 73)
- Party: FDP

Wolfram Bergerowski (14 March 1936 – 2 June 2009) was a German politician of the Free Democratic Party (FDP) and former member of the German Bundestag.

== Life ==
Wolfram Bergerowski joined the FDP in 1968 and was a member of the state executive of the party in Baden-Württemberg. From 1971 to 1980, he was a member of the Ludwigsburg district council and from 1976 to 1980 he was also a member of the Baden-Württemberg state parliament. He was elected to the state parliament via the second mandate in the Ludwigsburg constituency. From 1980 to 1983, he was then a member of the German Bundestag via the State List of Baden-Württemberg. In the Bundestag he was a member of the Committee on Legal Affairs, the Committee on Petitions and the Committee on Internal German Relations.

== Literature ==
Herbst, Ludolf; Jahn, Bruno (2002). Vierhaus, Rudolf (ed.). Biographisches Handbuch der Mitglieder des Deutschen Bundestages. 1949–2002 [Biographical Handbook of the Members of the German Bundestag. 1949–2002] (in German). München: De Gruyter - De Gruyter Saur. p. 1715. ISBN 978-3-11-184511-1.
