= Helmut Buschbom =

German politician

Member of the Bundestag
- In office 16 June 1981 – 20 December 1990

Personal details
- Born: 24 April 1921 Thale
- Died: 16 January 2017 (aged 95) Berlin, Germany
- Party: CDU

Helmut Buschbom (April 24, 1921 – January 16, 2017) was a German politician of the Christian Democratic Union (CDU) and former member of the German Bundestag.

== Life ==
Buschbom had been a member of the CDU since 1957. Helmut Buschbom succeeded Richard von Weizsäcker in the German Bundestag on 16 June 1981 and was a member until the end of the 11th parliamentary term on 22 December 1990.

== Literature ==
Herbst, Ludolf; Jahn, Bruno (2002). Vierhaus, Rudolf (ed.). Biographisches Handbuch der Mitglieder des Deutschen Bundestages. 1949–2002 [Biographical Handbook of the Members of the German Bundestag. 1949–2002] (in German). München: De Gruyter - De Gruyter Saur. p. 1715. ISBN 978-3-11-184511-1.
