= Karl Becker (politician, born 1923) =

German politician (1923–2002)

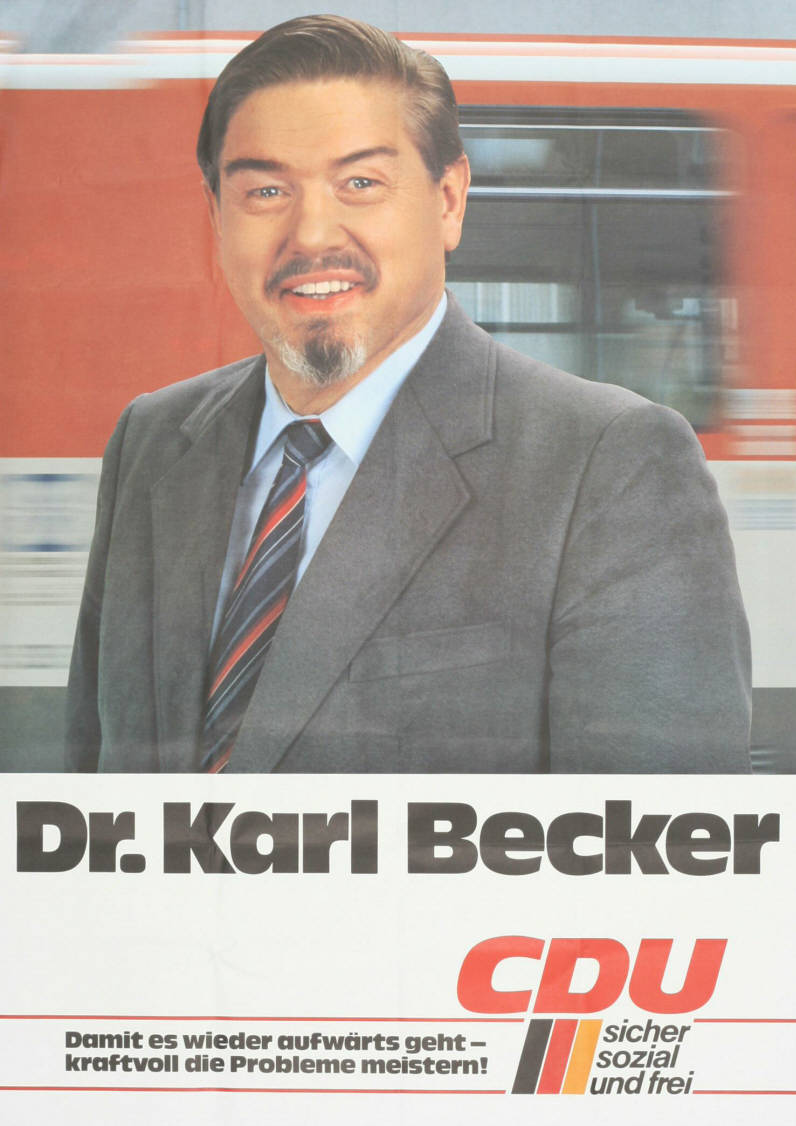
- Karl Becker's candidate poster for the 1983 federal election

Member of the Bundestag; from Hesse
- In office 13 September 1982 – 20 December 1990
- Preceded by: Hans-Joachim Jentsch
- Succeeded by: Multi-member district
- Constituency: State list (1982–1983); Frankfurt am Main II (1983–1990)
- In office 14 December 1976 – 4 November 1980
- Preceded by: Fred Zander
- Succeeded by: Fred Zander
- Constituency: Frankfurt am Main II

Personal details
- Born: 20 September 1923 Flörsheim am Main, Germany
- Died: 3 May 2002 (aged 78) Frankfurt, Germany
- Party: Christian Democratic Union
- Children: 2
- Occupation: Internist

Karl Becker (20 September 1923 – 3 May 2002) was a German politician of the Christian Democratic Union (CDU) and former member of the German Bundestag.

== Political career ==
Becker became a member of the CDU in 1969. In the 1976 federal elections, he was elected to the German Bundestag via the Frankfurt am Main II constituency, of which he was a member until 1980. From 13 September 1982, when he succeeded Hans-Joachim Jentsch, he was again a member of the Bundestag until 1990. From 1983 to 1990 he again represented the constituency of Frankfurt II in parliament.

== Literature ==
Herbst, Ludolf; Jahn, Bruno (2002). Vierhaus, Rudolf (ed.). Biographisches Handbuch der Mitglieder des Deutschen Bundestages. 1949–2002 [Biographical Handbook of the Members of the German Bundestag. 1949–2002] (in German). München: De Gruyter - De Gruyter Saur. p. 1715. ISBN 978-3-11-184511-1.
