= Rolf Böhme =

German politician (1934–2019)

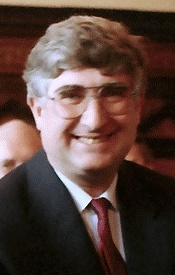
Rolf Böhme, 1987

Rolf Böhme (6 August 1934, Konstanz – 12 February 2019) was a German politician and mayor of the southwestern city of Freiburg for twenty years, between 1982 and 2002.

He is a former member of the Social Democratic Party. Before becoming mayor, he sat in the German parliament (Bundestag), between 1972 and 1982.
