= Rainer Offergeld =

German politician

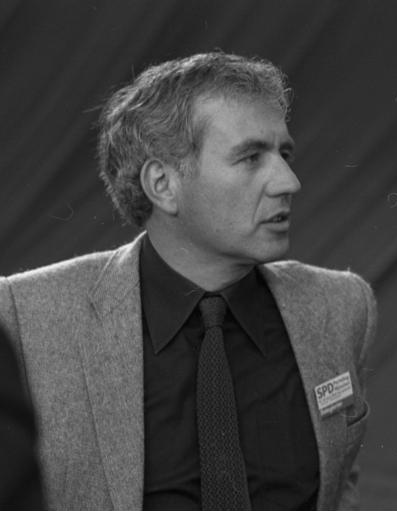
- Offergeld in 1982

Minister of Economic Cooperation
- In office 16 February 1978 – 1 October 1982
- Prime Minister: Helmut Schmidt
- Preceded by: Marie Schlei
- Succeeded by: Jürgen Warnke

Personal details
- Born: 26 December 1937 (age 88) Genoa, Italy
- Party: Social Democratic Party

Rainer Offergeld (born 26 December 1937) is a German politician. He was minister of Economic Cooperation from 1978 to 1982. Offergeld was mayor of Lörrach from 1984 to 1995.
