= Marie Schlei =

German politician (1919–1983)

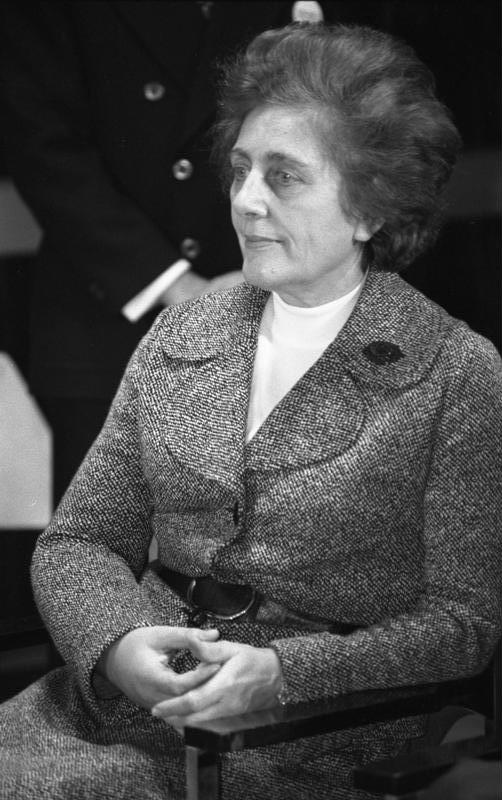
- Marie Schlei in 1975

Minister of Economic Cooperation
- In office 15 December 1976 – 6 February 1978
- Chancellor: Helmut Schmidt
- Preceded by: Egon Bahr
- Succeeded by: Rainer Offergeld

Personal details
- Born: Marie Stabenow; 26 November 1919 Reetz/Neumark, Weimar Germany
- Died: 21 May 1983 (aged 63) West Berlin, West Germany
- Party: Social Democratic Party
- Children: 1

Marie Schlei (née: Stabenow; 26 November 1919 – 21 May 1983) was a German politician and a member of Social Democratic Party (SPD). She served as minister of economic cooperation from 1976 to 1978, being the first female head of the ministry.

== Early life and education ==
She was born Marie Stabenow in Reetz, Pommern, on 26 November 1919. She attended secondary school and worked in various jobs, including saleswoman, postal clerk and local government clerk. She fled from Pomerania in 1945 and settled first in the Weserbergland and then in Berlin.

== Career and activities ==
Schlei began to work as a teacher in Berlin and became a school administrator of a school in the Berlin's Wedding quarter. Next she worked as a school inspector.

Schlei joined the SPD in 1949. She was elected to the Bundestag for the party representing Berlin in 1969. She held the post until 1983. She was the parliamentary state secretary in the premier's office from 1974 to 1976.

Schlei was appointed minister of economic cooperation to the cabinet led by Prime Minister Helmut Schmidt on 15 December 1976, replacing Egon Bahr in the post. Her appointment was not welcomed by the German media due to being a woman. On 16 February 1978, she was replaced by Rainer Offergeld in the post.

== Personal life and death ==
She married in 1940, and her husband died in 1943 while fighting in World War II. She had a son from this marriage. Schlei died of cancer in West Berlin on 21 May 1983.

== Legacy ==
In 1984, the Marie Schlei Association was founded in Hamburg for her memory to help women in Africa, Asia and Latin America. The association develops projects to this end.
