= Federal Ministry for Economic Cooperation and Development =

Ministry of the Federal Republic of Germany

- Bundesministerium für wirtschaftliche Zusammenarbeit und Entwicklung

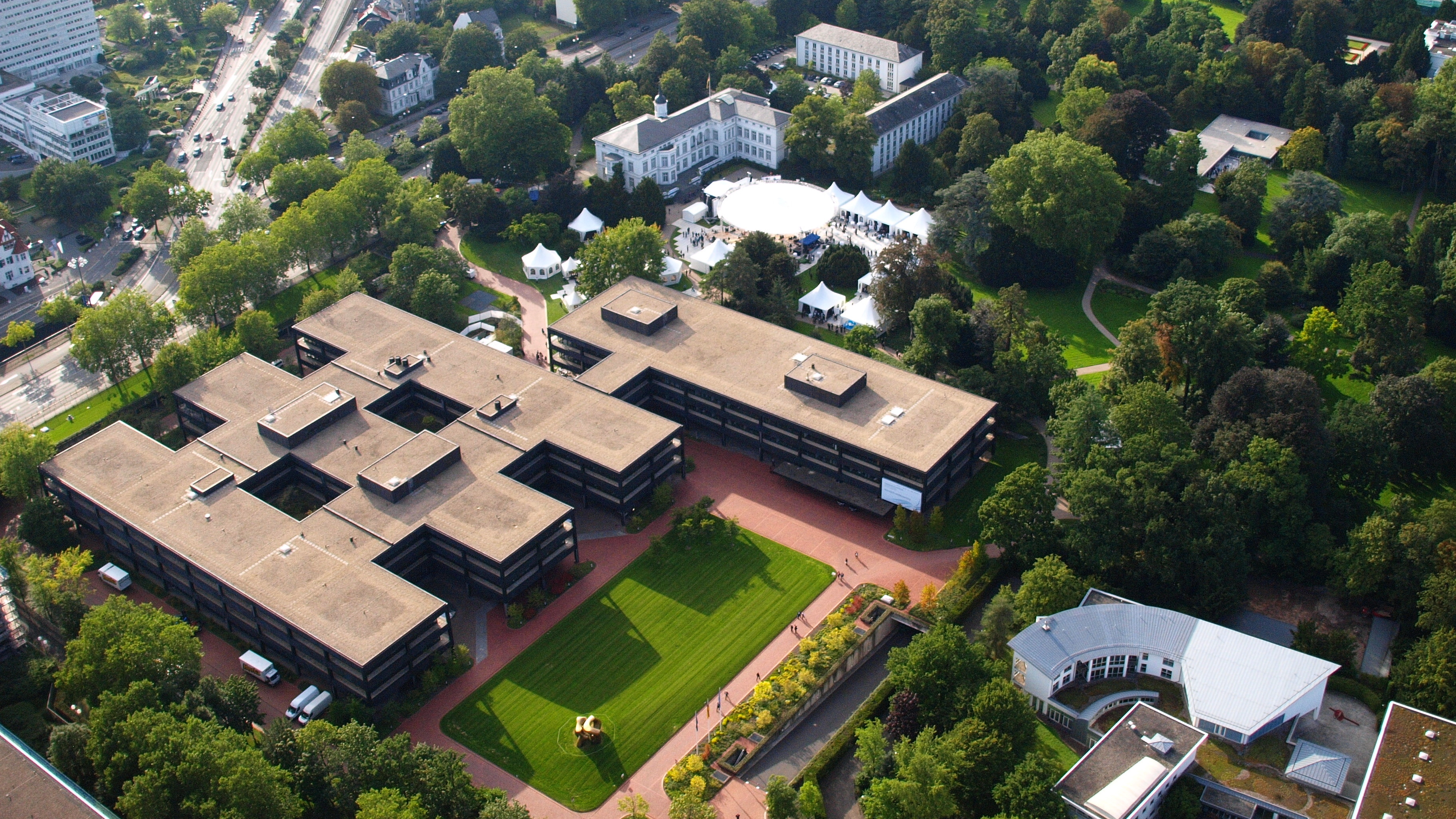
- Offices of the BMZ in the former Federal Chancellery in Bonn

Agency overview
- Formed: 14 November 1961
- Jurisdiction: Government of Germany
- Headquarters: Dahlmannstraße 4, 53113 Bonn
- Employees: approx. 1,100
- Annual budget: €9.94 billion (2025)
- Minister responsible: Reem Alabali-Radovan, Federal Minister for Economic Cooperation and Development
- Agency executives: Johann Saathoff, Parliamentary State Secretary; Bärbel Kofler, Parliamentary State Secretary; Niels Annen, State Secretary
- Website: www.bmz.de

The Federal Ministry for Economic Cooperation and Development (German: Bundesministerium für wirtschaftliche Zusammenarbeit und Entwicklung, pronounced [ˈbʊndəsminɪsˌteːʁiʊm fyːɐ̯ ˈvɪʁt.ʃaftlɪçə tsuˈzamənˌʔaʁbaɪt ʔʊnt ʔɛntˈvɪklʊŋ]; abbreviated BMZ) is a cabinet-level ministry of the Federal Republic of Germany. Its main office is at the former German Chancellery in Bonn with a second major office at the Europahaus in Berlin.

Founded in 1961, the Ministry works to encourage economic development within Germany and in other countries through international cooperation and partnerships. It cooperates with international organizations involved in development including the International Monetary Fund, World Bank, and the United Nations.

The BMZ was created in 1961 as a reflection of the growing prioritization of foreign aid beyond financial gain, a relatively unique choice at the time. Germany was a pioneer in establishing the BMZ, as most countries did not have established aid agencies for the explicit purpose of managing ODA. In the following decades, the BMZ increasingly prioritized sustainable development (SD) in policy discourse focusing on providing basic needs and explicitly incorporating Millennium Development Goals (MDGs). The MDGs were replaced with the Sustainable Development Goals (SDGs) upon the UN publication of Agenda 2030 in 2015. The BMZ strongly supported the reorientation led by the OECD towards tangible and measurable goals for sustainability.

In 2024 Germany was the second biggest donor of development cooperation after the United States, spending 32.4 billion USD, equivalent to 0.67% of GNI, on Official development assistance. Bilateral co-operation constitutes the bulk of Germany’s official development assistance (ODA), under the overall lead of the Federal Ministry for Economic Cooperation and Development (BMZ), while the Federal Foreign Office oversees humanitarian aid, crisis prevention, stabilisation and peace-building.

== List ==
Political Party: FDP CSU SPD

Name (Born–Died)		Portrait	Party	Term of Office		Chancellor (Cabinet)
Federal Minister for Economic Cooperation (1961–1993) Federal Minister for Economic Cooperation and Development (since 1993)
1	Walter Scheel (1919–2016)		FDP	14 November 1961	28 October 1966	Adenauer (IV • V); Erhard (I • II)
2	Werner Dollinger (1918–2008)		CSU	28 October 1966	30 November 1966	Kiesinger (I)
3	Hans-Jürgen Wischnewski (1922–2005)		SPD	1 December 1966	2 October 1968	Kiesinger (I)
4	Erhard Eppler (1926–2019)		SPD	16 October 1968	8 July 1974	Kiesinger (I); Brandt (I • II)
5	Egon Bahr (1922–2015)		SPD	8 July 1974	14 December 1976	Schmidt (I)
6	Marie Schlei (1919–1983)		SPD	16 December 1976	16 February 1978	Schmidt (II)
7	Rainer Offergeld (born 1937)		SPD	16 February 1978	1 October 1982	Schmidt (II • III)
8	Jürgen Warnke (1932–2013)		CSU	4 October 1982	11 March 1987	Kohl I • (II)
9	Hans Klein (1931–1996)		CSU	12 March 1987	21 April 1989	Kohl (III)
10	Jürgen Warnke (1932–2013)		CSU	21 April 1989	18 January 1991	Kohl (III)
11	Carl-Dieter Spranger (born 1939)		CSU	18 January 1991	26 October 1998	Kohl (IV • V)
12	Heidemarie Wieczorek-Zeul (born 1942)		SPD	27 October 1998	27 October 2009	Schröder (I • II); Merkel (I)
13	Dirk Niebel (born 1963)		FDP	28 October 2009	17 December 2013	Merkel (II)
14	Gerd Müller (born 1955)		CSU	17 December 2013	8 December 2021	Merkel (III • IV)
15	Svenja Schulze (born 1968)		SPD	8 December 2021	6 may 2025	Scholz (I)
16	Reem Alabali-Radovan (born 1990)		SPD	6 May 2025	Incumbent	Merz (I)
