= Jürgen Warnke =

German politician (1932–2013)

- Warnke in 1990

Minister of Economic Cooperation
- In office 21 April 1989 – 18 January 1991
- Chancellor: Helmut Kohl
- Preceded by: Hans Klein
- Succeeded by: Carl-Dieter Spranger
- In office 4 October 1982 – 11 March 1987
- Chancellor: Helmut Kohl
- Preceded by: Rainer Offergeld
- Succeeded by: Hans Klein

Minister of Transport
- In office 12 March 1987 – 21 April 1989
- Chancellor: Helmut Kohl
- Preceded by: Werner Dollinger
- Succeeded by: Friedrich Zimmermann

Member of the Bundestag; from Bavaria
- In office 20 October 1969 – 26 October 1998
- Preceded by: Multi-member district
- Succeeded by: Petra Ernstberger
- Constituency: State list (1969–1983); Hof (1983–1998)

Member of the Landtag of Bavaria; for Upper Franconia
- In office 7 December 1962 – 3 December 1970

Personal details
- Born: Jürgen Walter Franz Karl Warnke; 20 April 1932 Berlin, Germany
- Died: 27 April 2013 (aged 81) Selb, Germany
- Party: Christian Social Union
- Children: 6
- Education: University of Geneva

Jürgen Warnke (20 March 1932 – 27 April 2013) was a German lawyer and politician who served in various capacities at the Bundestag and German cabinets.

== Early life and education ==
Warnke was born in Berlin on 20 March 1932. His family were from Mecklenburg, and in 1945 settled in Upper Franconia. His father was a jurist and served as the chief executive of the association of ceramic industry.

He studied law and economics and held a PhD.

== Career ==
Warnke, a lawyer by profession, was a member of the Christian Social Union. He was a member of the Bavarian Parliament from 1962 to 1970. He entered the Bundestag in 1969 and represented the Hof district from 1983 to 1998. He served as a cabinet member in the governments led by the Prime Minister Helmut Kohl between 1982 and 1991. Warnke was first appointed minister of economic cooperation in 1982 and was in office until 1987. Then he became the minister of transport which he held from 1987 to 1989. Lastly he was reappointed minister of economic cooperation in a cabinet reshuffle in April 1989. His term ended in 1991. In 1998 he retired from politics.

He was also the managing director of the Bavarian chemical industry association and then the chief executive of the association of ceramic industry. In addition, he was on the council of the Evangelical Church of Germany.

== Personal life and death ==
Warnke was married and had six children. He began to live in Dagebüll on the North Sea after retiring from politics.

He died at the age of 81 in Selb on 27 April 2013. A funeral service for him was held in St. Andrew's Church in Selb with the attendance of German politicians and family members.

== Honors ==
Warnke was awarded the Federal Cross of Merit.

=== Foreign honor ===
- Malaysia: Honorary Commander of the Order of the Defender of the Realm (P.M.N.) (1986)
