= Olaf Feldmann =

German politician

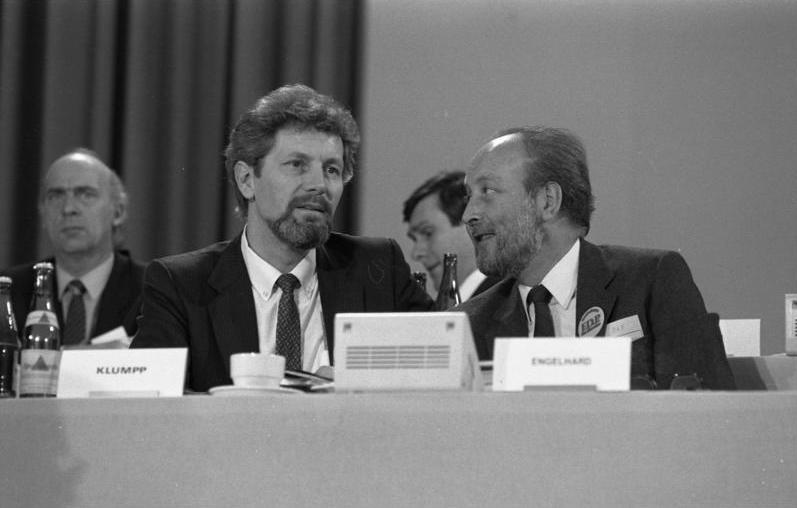
- Feldmann (middle) 1983 together with Hans A. Engelhard (right)

Member of the Bundestag
- In office 29 January 1981 – 26 October 1998

Personal details
- Born: 9 May 1937 (age 89) Elbing
- Party: FDP

Olaf Feldmann (born 9 May 1937) was a German politician of the Free Democratic Party (FDP) and former member of the German Bundestag.

== Life ==
On 29 January 1981 Feldmann joined the German Bundestag, where he sat as a member of parliament until 1998. He was the spokesman for tourism and disarmament policy of the FDP parliamentary group and deputy chairman of the Sports Committee.

== Literature ==
Herbst, Ludolf; Jahn, Bruno (2002). Vierhaus, Rudolf (ed.). Biographisches Handbuch der Mitglieder des Deutschen Bundestages. 1949–2002 [Biographical Handbook of the Members of the German Bundestag. 1949–2002] (in German). München: De Gruyter - De Gruyter Saur. p. 1715. ISBN 978-3-11-184511-1.
