= Hansjürgen Doss =

German politician

Member of the Bundestag
- In office 1981–2002

Personal details
- Born: 9 August 1936 (age 89) Münster, West Germany (now Germany)
- Party: CDU

Hansjürgen Doss (born 9 August 1936) is a German politician of the Christian Democratic Union (CDU) and former member of the German Bundestag.

== Life ==
Doss joined the CDU in 1965 and was elected to the state executive of the CDU Rhineland-Palatinate. Doss was a member of the city council of Mainz from 1979 to 1981. From January to August 1981, he was a member of the Rhineland-Palatinate state parliament. He was a member of the German Bundestag from 20 July 1981, when he succeeded Elmar Pieroth, who had resigned, until 2002. He was always elected to the Bundestag via the Rhineland-Palatinate state list. From 1990 to 2002, he was chairman of the parliamentary group for medium-sized businesses of the CDU/CSU parliamentary group and was a member of the group's executive committee.
