= Herbert Landau =

German jurist and former judge (born 1948)

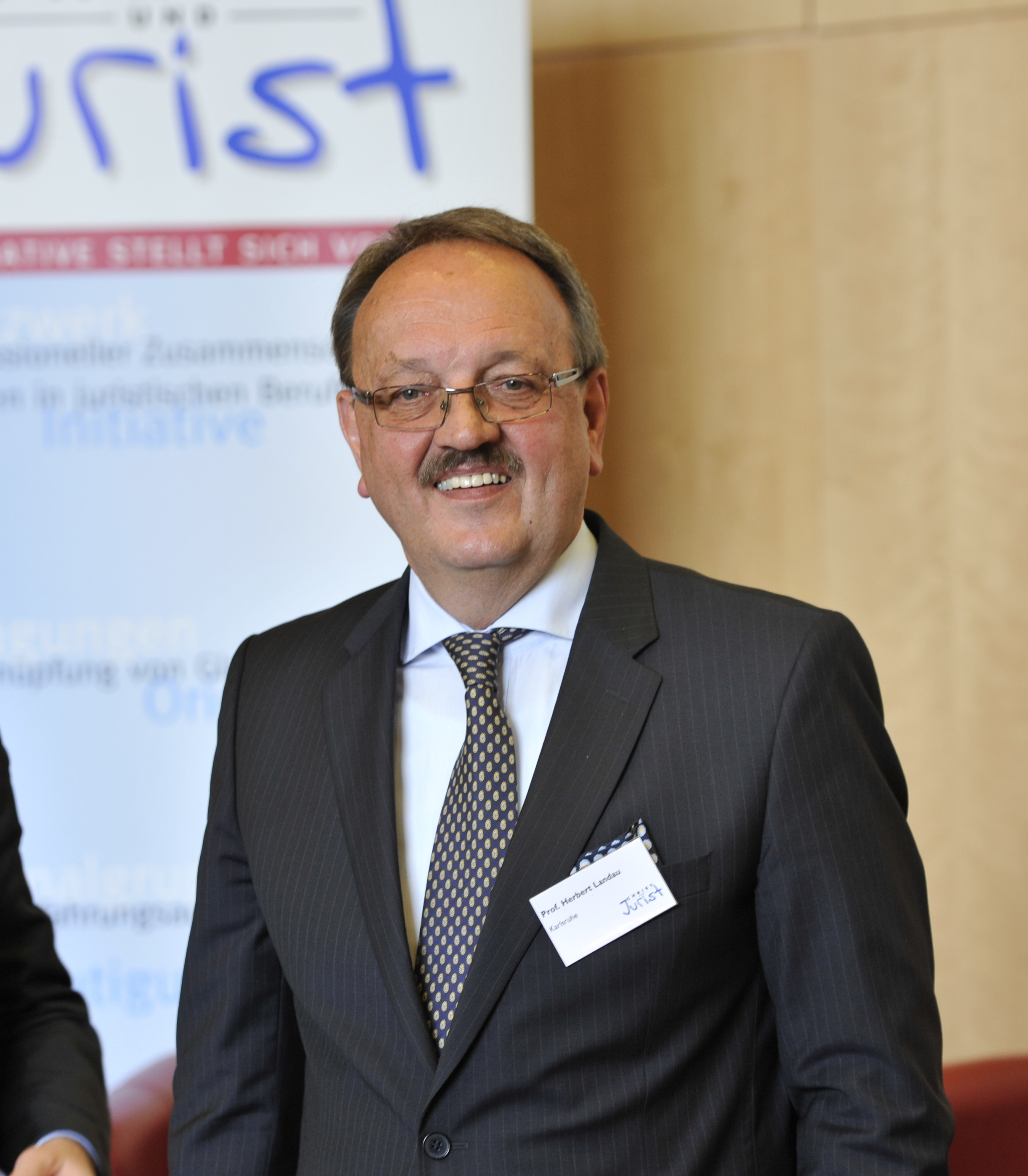
Herbert Landau

Herbert Landau (born 26 April 1948) is a German jurist and former judge of the Federal Constitutional Court of Germany.

== Early life and education ==
Landau was born in Wilnsdorf-Wilgersdorf. After completing an apprenticeship as a baker and confectioner in his parents' bakery (1966–1969), he performed his compulsory military service until 1970. He then studied social work at the Protestant University of Applied Sciences in Bochum (1970–1973) and worked as a social worker in youth services until 1976.

From 1974 to 1979, he studied law at the University of Giessen, where he was a scholar of the Konrad Adenauer Foundation. He passed his first state examination in 1979 and his second in 1982.

== Career ==
Landau entered the judicial service of the state of Hesse in 1982 and was appointed a judge for life in 1985. He initially served on secondment to the Federal Ministry of Justice and later to the administration of the Bundestag. In 1987, he became a judge at the District Court (Amtsgericht) in Dillenburg and served as a personal advisor to the Hessian minister of justice, Karl-Heinz Koch.

Between 1991 and 1996, he served as the chief public prosecutor at the Regional Court (Landgericht) in Limburg an der Lahn. In 1996, he was elected as a federal judge at the Federal Court of Justice (1st Criminal Senate). In 1999, he was appointed state secretary in the Hessian Ministry of Justice.

=== Federal Constitutional Court ===
On 23 September 2005, Landau was unanimously elected by the Bundesrat (on the proposal of the CDU/CSU) to the Federal Constitutional Court. He joined the Second Senate on 1 October 2005. He retired on 20 July 2016, upon reaching the age limit of 68. He was succeeded by Christine Langenfeld.

=== Post-judicial work ===
Since 2017, Landau has practiced law at a firm in Siegen, specializing in public and constitutional law, mediation, and arbitration.

In October 2016, the Saxon State Government appointed him to lead an expert commission investigating the "Albakr case." The commission was tasked with examining the police investigation and the subsequent suicide of terror suspect Jaber al-Bakr in a Leipzig prison cell. The final report, delivered in January 2017, criticized a "culture of lack of responsibility" and noted numerous errors by federal and state authorities.

== Academic work ==
Landau has been a lecturer at the University of Marburg since 2000 and was appointed an honorary professor there in 2006. In his academic work, he has argued that the administration of criminal justice is an essential part of the state's monopoly on violence and a core duty of the state. He is a co-editor of the legal journal Neue Zeitschrift für Strafrecht (NStZ).

In October 2016, Professor Landau was commissioned by the Saxon state government to head the expert commission ‘Police investigation and punishment of terrorist suicide bombers in the Albakr case’. This commission was set up to investigate the entire process, from the identification and failed arrest to the suicide of terror suspect Jaber Albakr on 12 October in a cell at Leipzig Prison. After three months of work, numerous site visits and almost 100 hearings with people from a wide range of federal and state authorities, the four-member Landau Commission presented its highly acclaimed final report to Minister President Stanislaw Tillich in Dresden on 24 January 2017 and explained its findings and recommendations to the public. In its report, it laments a ‘culture of incompetence’ and criticises numerous wrong decisions and rule violations by authorities at federal and state level.

== Personal life ==
Landau is married and has five children. He resides in Wilgersdorf.

== Honors ==
- 2016: Knight Commander's Cross (Great Cross of Merit with Star and Shoulder Ribbon)
- 2021: Wilhelm Leuschner Medal of the State of Hesse
