= Ansbach (electoral district) =

Federal electoral district of Germany

Coordinates: 49°10′52″N 10°36′24″E

240 Ansbach
- Electoral district for the Bundestag
- Ansbach in 2025
- State: Bavaria
- Population: 321,100 (2019)
- Electorate: 240,854 (2025)
- Major settlements: Ansbach; Weißenburg in Bayern; Gunzenhausen
- Area: 3,042.0 km^{2}

Current electoral district
- Created: 1949
- Party: CSU
- Member: Artur Auernhammer
- Elected: 2017, 2021, 2025

Ansbach is an electoral constituency (German: Wahlkreis) represented in the Bundestag. It elects one member via first-past-the-post voting. Under the current constituency numbering system, it is designated as constituency 240. It is located in western Bavaria, comprising the city of Ansbach and the districts of Landkreis Ansbach and Weißenburg-Gunzenhausen.

Ansbach was created for the inaugural 1949 federal election. Since 2017, it has been represented by Artur Auernhammer of the Christian Social Union (CSU).

== Geography ==
Ansbach is located in western Bavaria. As of the 2021 federal election, it comprises the independent city of Ansbach and the districts of Landkreis Ansbach and Weißenburg-Gunzenhausen.

== History ==
Ansbach was created in 1949. In the 1949 election, it was Bavaria constituency 30 in the numbering system. In the 1953 through 1961 elections, it was number 225. In the 1965 through 1998 elections, it was number 227. In the 2002 and 2005 elections, it was number 242. In the 2009 through 2021 elections, it was number 241. From the 2025 election, it has been number 240.

Originally, the constituency comprised the independent cities of Ansbach and Rothenburg ob der Tauber and the districts of Landkreis Ansbach, Feuchtwangen, Landkreis Rothenburg ob der Tauber, and Uffenheim. In the 1965 through 1972 elections, it lost the Feuchtwangen district while gaining the independent city of Schwabach and Landkreis Schwabach district. In the 1976 through 1987 elections, it comprised the city of Ansbach and Landkreis Ansbach district. It acquired its current borders in the 1990 election.

Election	No.	Name	Borders
1949	30	Ansbach	Ansbach city; Rothenburg ob der Tauber city; Landkreis Ansbach district; Landkreis Rothenburg ob der Tauber district; Feuchtwangen district; Uffenheim district
1953	225	Ansbach	Ansbach city; Rothenburg ob der Tauber city; Landkreis Ansbach district; Landkreis Rothenburg ob der Tauber district; Feuchtwangen district; Uffenheim district
1957	225	Ansbach	Ansbach city; Rothenburg ob der Tauber city; Landkreis Ansbach district; Landkreis Rothenburg ob der Tauber district; Feuchtwangen district; Uffenheim district
1961	225	Ansbach	Ansbach city; Rothenburg ob der Tauber city; Landkreis Ansbach district; Landkreis Rothenburg ob der Tauber district; Feuchtwangen district; Uffenheim district
1965	227	Ansbach	Ansbach city; Rothenburg ob der Tauber city; Schwabach city; Landkreis Ansbach district; Landkreis Rothenburg ob der Tauber district; Landkreis Schwabach district; Uffenheim district
1969	227	Ansbach	Ansbach city; Rothenburg ob der Tauber city; Schwabach city; Landkreis Ansbach district; Landkreis Rothenburg ob der Tauber district; Landkreis Schwabach district; Uffenheim district
1972	227	Ansbach	Ansbach city; Rothenburg ob der Tauber city; Schwabach city; Landkreis Ansbach district; Landkreis Rothenburg ob der Tauber district; Landkreis Schwabach district; Uffenheim district
1976	227	Ansbach	Ansbach city; Landkreis Ansbach district
1980	227	Ansbach	Ansbach city; Landkreis Ansbach district
1983	227	Ansbach	Ansbach city; Landkreis Ansbach district
1987	227	Ansbach	Ansbach city; Landkreis Ansbach district
1990	227	Ansbach	Ansbach city; Landkreis Ansbach district; Weißenburg-Gunzenhausen district
1994	227	Ansbach	Ansbach city; Landkreis Ansbach district; Weißenburg-Gunzenhausen district
1998	227	Ansbach	Ansbach city; Landkreis Ansbach district; Weißenburg-Gunzenhausen district
2002	242	Ansbach	Ansbach city; Landkreis Ansbach district; Weißenburg-Gunzenhausen district
2005	242	Ansbach	Ansbach city; Landkreis Ansbach district; Weißenburg-Gunzenhausen district
2009	241	Ansbach	Ansbach city; Landkreis Ansbach district; Weißenburg-Gunzenhausen district
2013	241	Ansbach	Ansbach city; Landkreis Ansbach district; Weißenburg-Gunzenhausen district
2017	241	Ansbach	Ansbach city; Landkreis Ansbach district; Weißenburg-Gunzenhausen district
2021	241	Ansbach	Ansbach city; Landkreis Ansbach district; Weißenburg-Gunzenhausen district
2025	240	Ansbach	Ansbach city; Landkreis Ansbach district; Weißenburg-Gunzenhausen district

== Members ==
The constituency has been held continuously by the Christian Social Union (CSU) since its creation. It was first represented by Friedrich Bauereisen from 1949 to 1961, followed by Georg Ehnes from 1961 to 1972. Carl-Dieter Spranger was then representative from 1972 to 2002, a total of eight consecutive terms. Josef Göppel then served from 2002 to 2017. Artur Auernhammer was elected in 2017 and re-elected in 2021 and 2025.

Election	Member	Party	%
1949	Friedrich Bauereisen	CSU	34.9
1953	Friedrich Bauereisen	CSU	51.1
1957	Friedrich Bauereisen	CSU	65.0
1961	Georg Ehnes	CSU	60.6
1965	Georg Ehnes	CSU	54.5
1969	Georg Ehnes	CSU	52.3
1972	Carl-Dieter Spranger	CSU	51.8
1976	Carl-Dieter Spranger	CSU	64.4
1980	Carl-Dieter Spranger	CSU	61.3
1983	Carl-Dieter Spranger	CSU	64.8
1987	Carl-Dieter Spranger	CSU	58.1
1990	Carl-Dieter Spranger	CSU	56.1
1994	Carl-Dieter Spranger	CSU	54.1
1998	Carl-Dieter Spranger	CSU	50.4
2002	Josef Göppel	CSU	56.4
2005	Josef Göppel	CSU	54.3
2009	Josef Göppel	CSU	47.4
2013	Josef Göppel	CSU	53.5
2017	Artur Auernhammer	CSU	44.3
2021	Artur Auernhammer	CSU	38.4
2025	Artur Auernhammer	CSU	41.8

== Election results ==
=== 2025 election ===
Federal election (2025): Ansbach
Notes:	Blue background denotes the winner of the electorate vote. Pink background denotes a candidate elected from their party list. Yellow background denotes an electorate win by a list member, or other incumbent. A ✓ or ✗ denotes status of any incumbent, win or lose respectively.						
Party	Candidate	Votes	%	±%	Party votes	%	±%
CSU	✓ Artur Auernhammer	84,718	41.8	▲3.4	75,746	37.3	▲4.2
AfD	Stefan Wigler	43,010	21.2	▲11.6	43,681	21.5	▲11.5
SPD	Daniel Mirlach	26,716	13.2	▼4.5	24,614	12.1	▼7.5
Greens	Sebastian Hermann Amler	18,247	9.0	▼2.2	19,216	9.5	▼2.2
FW	Markus Herbert Mooser	10.958	5.4	▼3.3	9,498	4.7	▼3.0
Left	Nadja Gschwendtner	9,432	4.7	▲2.7	10,146	5.0	▲2.4
BSW					7,345	3.6	
FDP	Franziska Kremer	5,372	2.6	▼4.2	6,859	3.4	▼5.1
APT					1,676	0.8	▼0.3
ÖDP	Kevin Settler	2,256	1.1	▼0.4	1,089	0.5	▼0.3
Volt	Markus Alexander Wolff	2,098	1.0		1,162	0.6	▲0.4
dieBasis					806	0.4	▼1.7
PARTEI					713	0.4	▼0.3
BP					257	0.1	▼0.1
BD					188	0.1	
Humanists					152	0.1	Steady
MLPD					34	0.0	Steady
Informal votes		1,082			707		
Total valid votes		202,807			203,182		
Turnout		203,889	84.7	▲5.5			
CSU hold	Majority	41,708	20.6	▼0.1			

=== 2021 election ===
Federal election (2021): Ansbach
Notes:	Blue background denotes the winner of the electorate vote. Pink background denotes a candidate elected from their party list. Yellow background denotes an electorate win by a list member, or other incumbent. A ✓ or ✗ denotes status of any incumbent, win or lose respectively.						
Party	Candidate	Votes	%	±%	Party votes	%	±%
CSU	✓ Artur Auernhammer	73,312	38.4	▼5.9	63,299	33.1	▼7.3
SPD	Harry Scheuenstuhl	33,819	17.7	▼0.6	37,642	19.7	▲2.6
Greens	Herbert Sirois	21,343	11.2	▲3.6	22,325	11.7	▲2.9
AfD	Daniel Lösch	18,418	9.6	▼0.9	19,142	10.0	▼1.8
FW	Sylvia Bogenreuther	16,592	8.7	▲2.2	14,738	7.7	▲4.3
FDP	Thomas Kestler	13,016	6.8	▲2.6	16,213	8.5	▲1.0
dieBasis	Markus Engelhardt	5,167	2.7		4,052	2.1	
Left	Erkan Dinar	3,798	2.0	▼4.1	4,904	2.6	▼4.1
Tierschutzpartei					2,218	1.2	▲0.3
ÖDP	Kilian Welser	2,902	1.5	▼0.8	1,518	0.8	▼0.4
PARTEI					1,312	0.7	0.0
Pirates	Markus Wanger	2,180	1.1		1,048	0.5	▲0.1
BP					523	0.3	0.0
Team Todenhöfer					408	0.2	
Unabhängige					367	0.2	
NPD	Maik Langen	447	0.2		359	0.2	▼0.2
Bündnis C					279	0.1	
Gesundheitsforschung					261	0.1	0.0
Volt					249	0.1	
V-Partei3					197	0.1	0.0
Humanists					145	0.1	
du.					101	0.1	
The III. Path					98	0.1	
DKP					42	0.0	0.0
MLPD					24	0.0	0.0
LKR					22	0.0	
Informal votes		1,514			1,022		
Total valid votes		190,994			191,486		
Turnout		192,508	79.2	▲2.9			
CSU hold	Majority	39,493	20.7	▼5.3			

=== 2017 election ===
Federal election (2017): Ansbach
Notes:	Blue background denotes the winner of the electorate vote. Pink background denotes a candidate elected from their party list. Yellow background denotes an electorate win by a list member, or other incumbent. A ✓ or ✗ denotes status of any incumbent, win or lose respectively.						
Party	Candidate	Votes	%	±%	Party votes	%	±%
CSU	Artur Auernhammer	81,431	44.3	▼9.0	74,425	40.4	▼7.3
SPD	Lutz Egerer	33,755	18.4	▼4.9	31,464	17.1	▼5.2
AfD	Wolfgang Dörner	19,396	10.5		21,734	11.8	▲8.2
Greens	Herbert Sirois	13,946	7.6	▲1.7	16,239	8.8	▲0.5
FW	Marco Meier	11,980	6.5	▲2.4	6,252	3.4	▲0.2
Left	Harald Weinberg	11,179	6.1	▲2.3	12,208	6.6	▲2.8
FDP	Johannes Dallheimer	7,661	4.2	▼0.4	13,825	7.5	▲2.9
ÖDP	Günther Brendle-Behnisch	4,244	2.3		2,131	1.2	0.0
Tierschutzpartei					1,585	0.9	▲0.2
PARTEI					1,209	0.7	
Pirates					812	0.4	▼1.5
NPD					788	0.4	▼0.8
BP					494	0.3	▼0.3
DIE VIOLETTEN	Bruno Walter	311	0.2	▼0.1			
DM					292	0.2	
Gesundheitsforschung					291	0.2	
V-Partei³					233	0.1	
DiB					178	0.1	
BGE					176	0.1	
MLPD					36	0.0	0.0
DKP					25	0.0	
BüSo					21	0.0	0.0
Informal votes		2,052			1,537		
Total valid votes		183,903			184,418		
Turnout		185,955	76.3	▲7.9			
CSU hold	Majority	47,676	25.9	▼4.2			

=== 2013 election ===
Federal election (2013): Ansbach
Notes:	Blue background denotes the winner of the electorate vote. Pink background denotes a candidate elected from their party list. Yellow background denotes an electorate win by a list member, or other incumbent. A ✓ or ✗ denotes status of any incumbent, win or lose respectively.						
Party	Candidate	Votes	%	±%	Party votes	%	±%
CSU	✓ Josef Göppel	87,922	53.3	▲6.0	78,640	47.6	▲7.5
SPD	Anette Pappler	38,331	23.2	▲1.3	36,690	22.2	▲2.9
Greens	Sina Doughan	9,665	5.9	▼2.4	13,771	8.3	▼1.8
FDP	Rainer Erdel	7,454	4.5	▼5.7	7,619	4.6	▼9.1
FW	Otto Sparrer	6,705	4.1		5,208	3.2	
Left	Peter Schlegel	6,202	3.8	▼1.7	6,368	3.9	▼3.3
AfD					5,950	3.6	
Pirates	Daniel Gruber	3,938	2.4	▲0.5	3,276	2.0	▼0.1
NPD		2,496	1.5	▼0.7	2,008	1.2	▼0.6
ÖDP					1,848	1.1	▼0.4
Tierschutzpartei					1,114	0.7	▲0.1
BP		1,522	0.9		860	0.5	▲0.2
REP					643	0.4	▼0.4
DIE FRAUEN					351	0.2	
DIE VIOLETTEN		433	0.3		239	0.1	▼0.1
PRO					177	0.1	
Party of Reason					156	0.1	
RRP		204	0.1		123	0.1	▼0.6
BüSo					33	0.0	0.0
MLPD					23	0.0	0.0
Informal votes		1,683			1,458		
Total valid votes		164,872			165,097		
Turnout		166,555	68.4	▼2.1			
CSU hold	Majority	49,591	30.1	▲4.6			

=== 2009 election ===
Federal election (2009): Ansbach
Notes:	Blue background denotes the winner of the electorate vote. Pink background denotes a candidate elected from their party list. Yellow background denotes an electorate win by a list member, or other incumbent. A ✓ or ✗ denotes status of any incumbent, win or lose respectively.						
Party	Candidate	Votes	%	±%	Party votes	%	±%
CSU	✓ Josef Göppel	80,239	47.4	▼6.9	68,128	40.1	▼6.9
SPD	Helga Koch	37,133	21.9	▼8.1	32,847	19.3	▼9.7
FDP	Rainer Erdel	17,346	10.2	▲6.2	23,222	13.7	▲5.9
Greens	Thomas Kestler	14,054	8.3	▲3.0	17,294	10.2	▲3.0
Left	Erkan Dinar	9,231	5.4	▲2.6	12,176	7.2	▲3.6
NPD	Doreen Langen	3,835	2.3	0.0	3,023	1.8	▲0.1
ÖDP	Hermann Schweiger	3,658	2.2		2,662	1.6	
Pirates	Birger Schmidt	3,248	1.9		3,512	2.1	
FAMILIE					1,520	0.9	▲0.2
REP					1,301	0.8	▼0.6
RRP					1,159	0.7	
Tierschutzpartei					1,061	0.6	
Independent	Bernd Dorst	692	0.4				
PBC					618	0.4	▼0.4
BP					553	0.3	▲0.1
DIE VIOLETTEN					400	0.2	
CM					187	0.1	
DVU					128	0.1	
BüSo					42	0.0	0.0
MLPD					37	0.0	0.0
Informal votes		2,553			2,119		
Total valid votes		169,436			169,870		
Turnout		171,989	70.5	▼6.8			
CSU hold	Majority	43,106	25.5	▲1.2			

=== 2005 election ===
Federal election (2005):Ansbach
Notes:	Blue background denotes the winner of the electorate vote. Pink background denotes a candidate elected from their party list. Yellow background denotes an electorate win by a list member, or other incumbent. A ✓ or ✗ denotes status of any incumbent, win or lose respectively.						
Party	Candidate	Votes	%	±%	Party votes	%	±%
CSU	✓ Josef Göppel	100,090	54.3	▼2.1	87,051	47.0	▼9.3
SPD	Helga Koch	55,329	30.0	▼0.1	53,775	29.1	▼0.6
Greens	Michael Sichelstiel	9,851	5.3	0.0	13,327	7.2	▲0.5
FDP	Klaus Korff	7,475	4.1	▼0.3	14,434	7.8	▲3.8
Left	Erkan Dinar	5,171	2.8	▲2.2	6,537	3.5	▲3.0
NPD	Michael Heiß	4,213	2.3		3,063	1.7	▲1.4
REP					2,482	1.3	▲0.6
PBC	Josef Memmel	2,214	1.2	▲0.5	1,483	0.8	▲0.4
Familie					1,244	0.7	
Feminist					584	0.3	▲0.2
GRAUEN					520	0.3	▲0.2
BP					405	0.2	▲0.1
BüSo					101	0.1	0.0
MLPD					101	0.1	
Informal votes		3,192			2,428		
Total valid votes		184,343			185,107		
Turnout		187,535	77.3	▼2.9			
CSU hold	Majority	44,761	24.3				
