= Franz Amrehn =

German politician

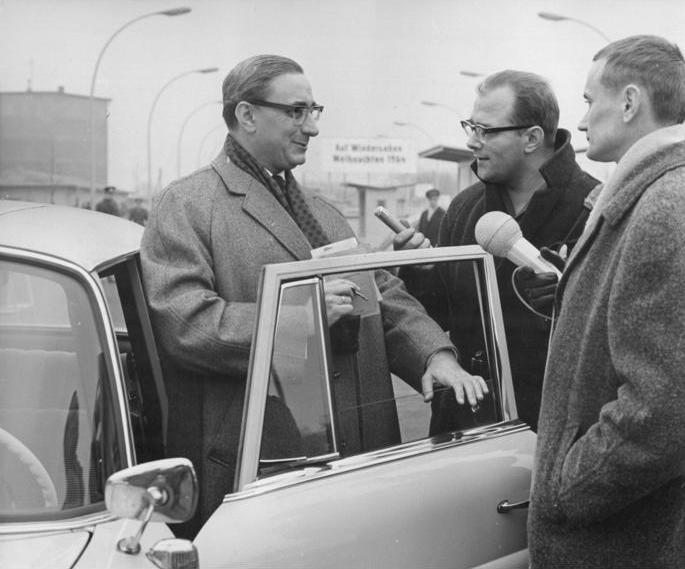
- Franz Amrehn (left) during a visit to East Berlin (1964)

Member of the Bundestag
- In office 20 October 1969 – 4 October 1981

Personal details
- Born: 23 November 1911 Berlin
- Died: 4 October 1981 (aged 69) Berlin, West-Germany
- Party: CDU
- Occupation: Lawyer

Franz Amrehn (23 November 1911 – 4 October 1981) was a German politician of the Christian Democratic Union (CDU) and member of the German Bundestag.

== Life ==
Amrehn joined the CDU in 1945 and was district councillor in the Berlin district of Steglitz from 1946 to 1948. In the 1950 election, he was elected to the Berlin House of Representatives, where he was vice president from 1952 to 1955. He was a member of the Chamber of Deputies until 1969, during which time he was the first state chairman of the CDU in Berlin from 1961 to 1969, having previously been second chairman for three years. From 1961 to 1973 he was also a member of the Federal Executive Committee.

After the 1954 elections, Otto Suhr (SPD) formed a grand coalition under SPD leadership. Amrehn was a member of the new senate as mayor. After the death of Otto Suhr on 30 August 1957 he provisionally assumed the duties of the governing mayor of Berlin until Willy Brandt was elected as Suhr's successor.

After the Bundestag elections in 1969, Amrehn was delegated to the German Bundestag by the Berlin House of Representatives. From 20 October 1969 until his death on 4 October 1981, he was a member of parliament for Berlin as a non-voting member. He was a full member of the Foreign Affairs Committee in all legislative periods.

== Literature ==
Herbst, Ludolf; Jahn, Bruno (2002). Vierhaus, Rudolf (ed.). Biographisches Handbuch der Mitglieder des Deutschen Bundestages. 1949–2002 [Biographical Handbook of the Members of the German Bundestag. 1949–2002] (in German). München: De Gruyter - De Gruyter Saur. p. 1715. ISBN 978-3-11-184511-1.
