= Artur Auernhammer =

German politician

Artur Auernhammer MdB
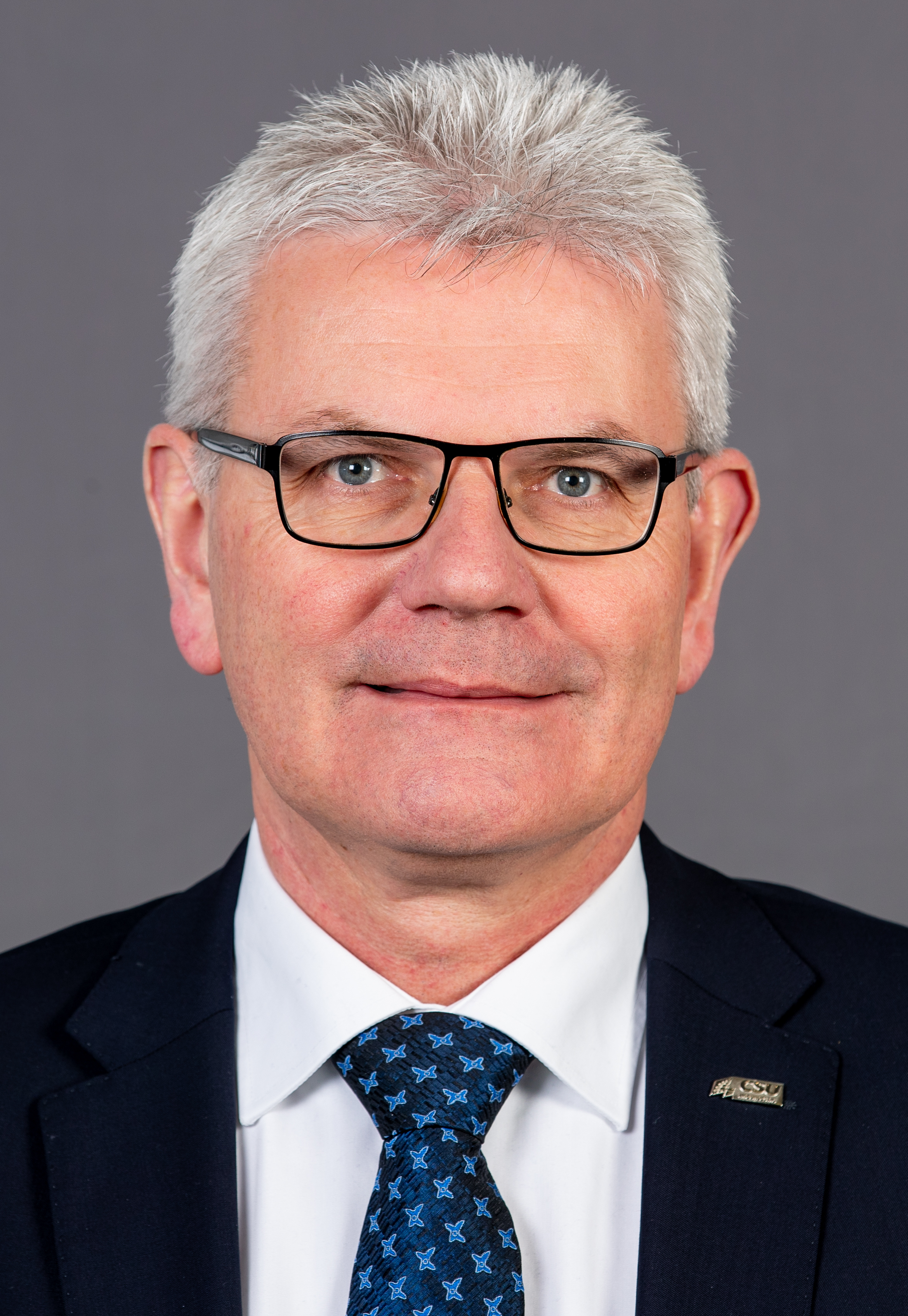
- Auernhammer in 2020

Member of the Bundestag; from Bavaria
- Incumbent
- Assumed office 22 October 2013
- Constituency: State list (2013–2017); Ansbach (2017–present)
- In office 29 July 2004 – 18 October 2005
- Preceded by: Albert Dess
- Succeeded by: Multi-member district
- Constituency: State list

Personal details
- Born: 9 March 1963 (age 63) Weißenburg in Bayern, West Germany
- Party: Christian Social Union
- Occupation: Farmer
- Website: artur-auernhammer.de

Artur Auernhammer (born 9 March 1963) is a German politician representative of the Christian Social Union in Bavaria (CSU). He has been a member of the German Bundestag since 2013 and chairman of the German Bioenergy Association (Bundesverband Bioenergie) since 2015.

== Education ==
After attending secondary school and the vocational college for agriculture, Auernhammer completed an agricultural apprenticeship. He then attended the agricultural college in Weißenburg in Bavaria and the higher agricultural college in Triesdorf. Auernhammer studied "Agriculture and Interest Representation" at the German Rural Youth Academy in Bonn-Röttgen and then took over his parents' farm in 1995. Auernhammer is now a state-certified farmer and master farmer on his parents' dairy farm, which he took over back in 1995.

== Political career ==
Auernhammer became a member of the Young Union of Germany (Junge Union Deutschlands) in 1993 and also of the CSU in 1994. From 1998 to 2013, he was district chairman of the CSU agricultural working group in Middle Franconia. From 2011 to 2017, he was deputy state chairman and also a founding member of the CSU's Working Group on Energy Transition (AKE). Artur Auernhammer is vice chairman of the CSU's Working Group on Food, Agriculture and Forestry (AG ELF).

Auernhammer has been a member of the Weißenburg-Gunzenhausen district council since 1996 and of the Weißenburg city council since 2002.

On 29 July 2004, he entered the German Bundestag to replace Albert Deß, who had resigned. However, he was not re-elected to the Bundestag in the 2005 Bundestag elections.

In the elections to the 18th German Bundestag on 22 September 2013, Auernhammer succeeded in entering the Bundestag again with list position 34. On 24 September 2017, he won the direct mandate for the electoral district of Ansbach with 44.3% of the first votes in the Bundestag election.

In the 19th legislative period, Artur Auernhammer is a full member of the Committee on Food and Agriculture and a full member of the Sports Committee. He is the CSU's agricultural policy spokesman in the Bundestag.

Between 2013 and 2017, Auernhammer served as deputy chairman of the Committee on the Environment, Nature Conservation, Building and Nuclear Safety (alongside chairwoman Bärbel Höhn).

In the negotiations to form a coalition government following the 2017 federal elections, Auernhammer was part of the working group on agriculture, led by Julia Klöckner, Christian Schmidt and Anke Rehlinger.

== Other activities ==
=== Corporate boards ===
- Raiffeisenbank Weißenburg, Member of the General Meeting
- Südfleisch Holding AG, Member of the Advisory Board
- Viehvermarktungsgenossenschaft Nordbayern, Member of the Board

=== Non-profit organization ===
- German Bioenergy Industry Association (BBE), Chairman of the Board

== See also ==
- List of Bavarian Christian Social Union politicians
