= Ingrid Matthäus-Maier =

German politician (born 1945)

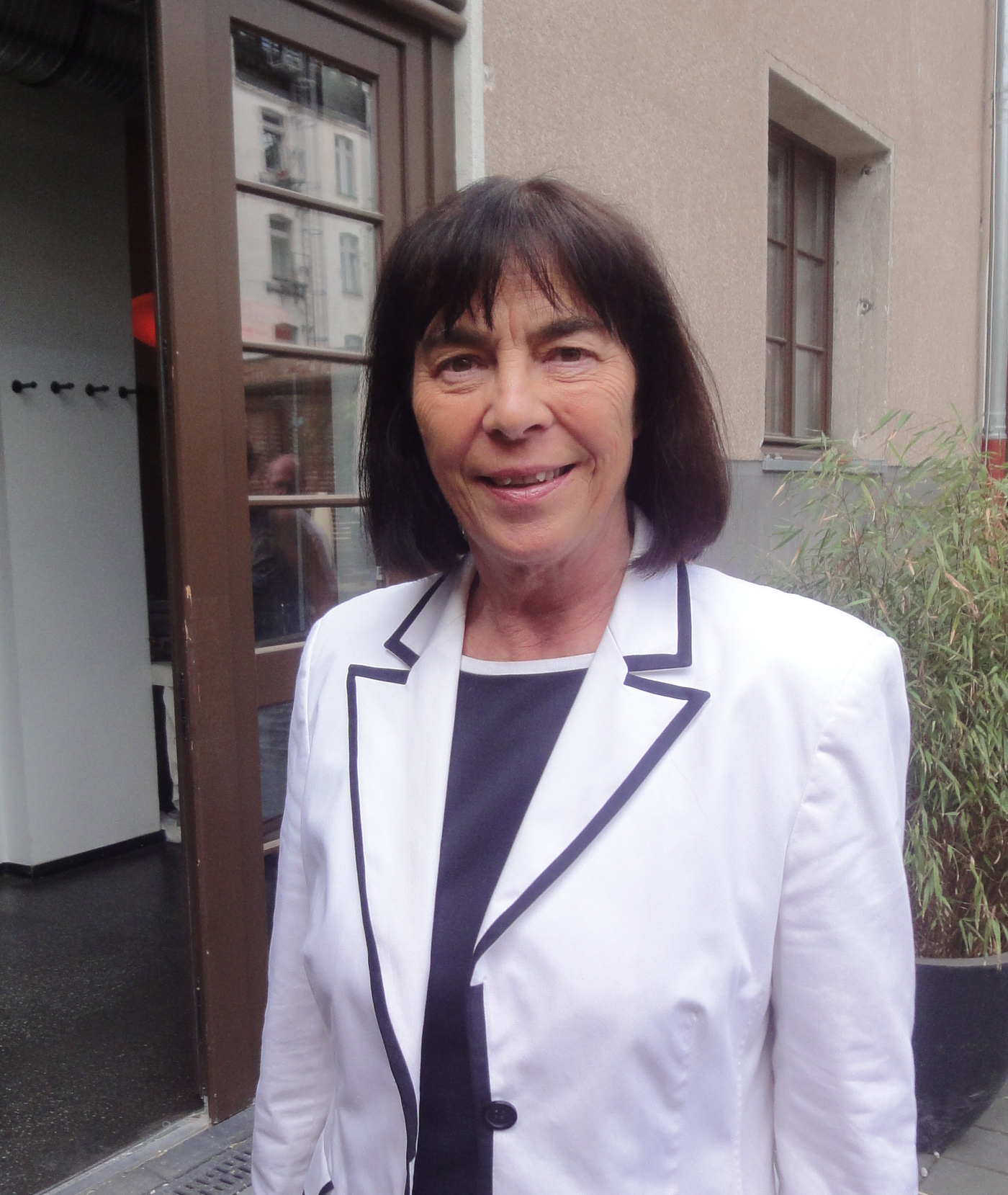
Ingrid Matthäus-Maier, 2012

Ingrid Matthäus-Maier (born 9 September 1945 in Werlte) is a German politician of the Social Democratic Party of Germany (SPD).

== Early life and education ==
In her childhood, Matthäus-Maier lived in Mülheim and went to school in Duisburg. In 1969, she joined JungdemokratInnen/Junge Linke. Matthäus-Maier studied German law in Gießen and Münster.

== Political career ==
From 1976 to 1999, Matthäus-Maier was a member of the German Bundestag. Initially, she was a member of the German political party FDP. From 1979 to 1982, she chaired the Finance Committee. In 1982, she left the FDP and joined the SPD. From 1988, she was her parliamentary group's deputy chair under the leadership of successive chairs Hans-Jochen Vogel, Hans-Ulrich Klose, Rudolf Scharping and Peter Struck.

== Life after politics ==
After she left the Bundestag, Matthäus-Maier became a member of the board of directors at Kreditanstalt für Wiederaufbau (KfW). In April 2008, after 18 months as chief executive, she resigned for health reasons and retired from the board of management at age 63. At the time, she was facing criticism over her handling of the crisis at IKB.

== Personal life ==
Matthäus-Maier is married to mathematician Robert Maier and has two children.
