= Helga Schuchardt =

German politician (born 1939)

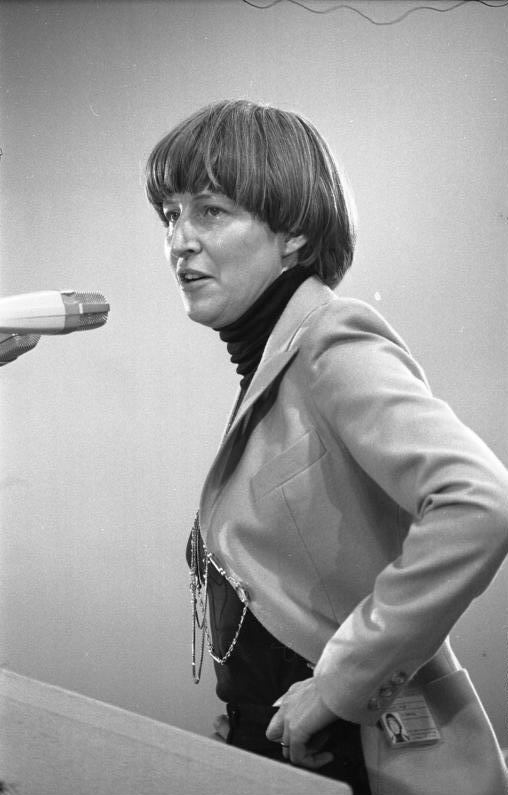
- Schuchardt in 1977

Member of the Bundestag
- In office 1972–1983

Personal details
- Born: 2 August 1939 (age 87) Hannover, Germany
- Party: FDP,
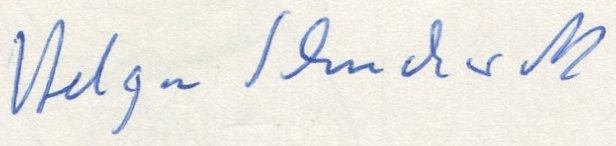
- Signature

Helga Schuchardt (born 2 August 1939 in Hannover) is a German politician and engineer.

== Early life and career ==
At the Private Berufsfachschule PTL Wedel Schuchardt became a technical engineer. From 1965 to 1972 she worked as an engineer for the German company Lufthansa.

== Political career ==
In 1965, Schuchardt became a member of the German party FDP. From 1972 to 1983 Schuchardt was a Member of the German Bundestag, where she served on the Committee on Education and Research, the Committee on Economic Cooperation and Development and the Sub-Committee on Humanitarian Aid. From 1975 to 1980, she served as chairwoman of the FDP in Hamburg.

In 1983, Schuchardt left the FDP and became a member of the Social Democratic Party (SPD). From 1983 to 1987 she served as State Minister (Senator) for Culture in the government of First Mayor of Hamburg Klaus von Dohnanyi in Hamburg. From 1990 to 1998 Schuchardt served as State Minister for Science and Culture in the government of Minister-President Gerhard Schröder in Lower Saxony.

== Other activities ==
- Volkswagen Foundation, Member of the Board of Trustees (1992–2002)
- Friedrich Naumann Foundation, Member of the Advisory Board (1978–1982)

== Personal life ==
From 1968 Schuchardt was married to Wolgang Schuchardt. Schuchardt outed herself as a lesbian and lives together with Inge Volk.
