= Christean Wagner =

German politician (1943–2025)

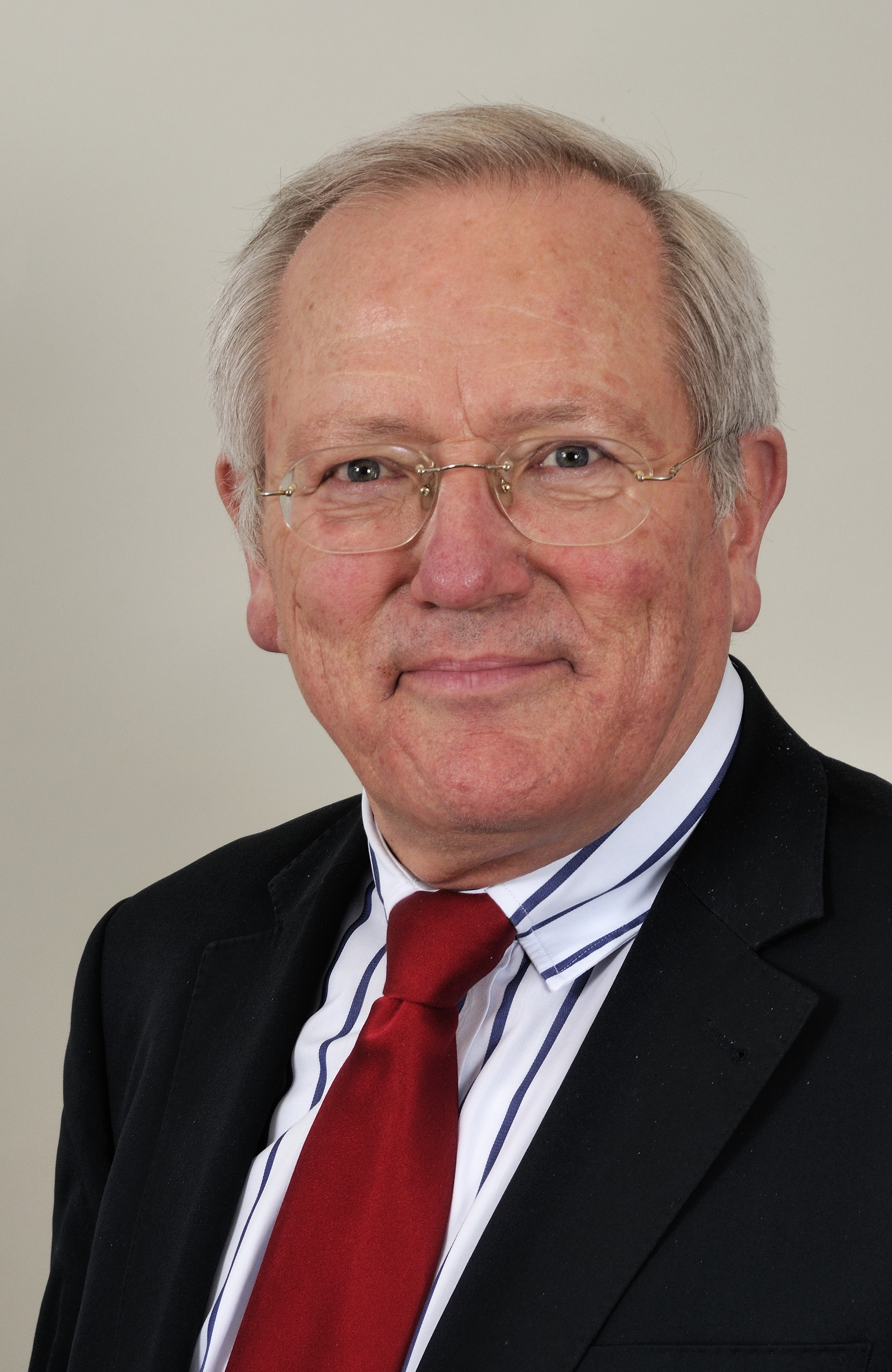
Christean Wagner (2013)

Christean Wagner (12 March 1943 – 4 July 2025) was a German politician for the Christian Democratic Union of Germany (CDU). He served as minister for Culture and Justice in the state of Hesse and was chair of the CDU fraction in the Hesse legislature.

== Life and career ==
Christean Wagner was, like his father, baptized in the Königsberg Cathedral. He studied law at the Philipps-Universität Marburg and Ruprecht-Karls-Universität Heidelberg. He concluded his studies with a national exam (Staatsexamen) and was promoted to Dr. iur. in 1972.

=== Political career ===
After having been City Manager in Holzminden in Lower Saxony from 1972 until 1975, he continued his career in local politics as Erster Kreisbeigeordneter (1975–1981) and Landrat (highest official of the district, 1981–1985) in the district Marburg-Biedenkopf and as chairman of the city council in Lahntal (1977–1981). He was the first Landrat in Hesse to introduce an environmental office. From 1989, he was a member of the Marburg-Biedenkopf district council.

In 1986–1987, Wagner was state secretary at the federal ministry for the environment and in 1987–1991, he was minister of culture in the state of Hesse. In the state parliamentary elections of 1991, he was elected to the Landtag (state parliament) and after the electoral victory of his party in 1999, he became the state's minister for justice.

On 15 November 2005, Wagner was elected to be the next chairman of the CDU fraction in the Hesse legislature as successor to Franz Josef Jung. Between 2007 and 2013, he was also chairman of the CDU/CSU-Fraktionsvorsitzendenkonferenz (the federal meeting of CDU/CSU fraction leaders). After the elections of 2013, he retired from the state legislature.

Wagner was in 2007 a key initiator of the Berliner Kreis in der Union, an informal group of state, federal and European CDU/CSU representatives that wants to increase the party's conservative and libertarian profile, to regain traction with former voters for the party and to modernize the party of Angela Merkel.

=== Other engagements ===
Wagner was a member of the student association ATV Marburg. He was a chairman of the Zentrum gegen Vertreibungen (Centre Against Expulsions) since 2018, where he succeeded its founder Erika Steinbach, who left the CDU over migration issues to join the right populist Alternative for Germany. The center focuses especially on documenting the expulsion of Germans after the Second World War.

=== Personal life and death ===
Wagner married thrice. His first marriage was to Roswitha Wagner in 1970, from whom he separated in 1999. There were multiple lawsuits before the court of Marburg and in the federal court between Wagner and his former inlaws. He died on July 4, 2025, at the age of 82.

== Political views ==
=== Education ===
Wagner was a known opponent of the concept of Gesamtschule, where the different secondary education types are offered in the same school. He advocated like Walter Wallmann for the freedom of parents to choose to send their children to a specific school type.

As chair of his fraction, Wagner spoke out in favor of tuition fees for long-term students and supported the introduction of tuition fees in general.

=== Justice ===
As minister for justice in Hesse, Wagner was the initiator of the electronic shackles (electronic tagging device) for some former criminals.

He also advocated for a harsher judicial system in Germany.

During the elections of 2008, he argued that foreigners who would insult Germans with "Scheiß-Deutscher" (shit-Germans), should be deported.

=== Profiling of the CDU ===
After Norbert Röttgen was fired in 2012 as federal minister for the environment, Wagner stated that he would like to see a sharper profile for the party: "Wir müssen uns auf unser C [christlich] besinnen und klare wirtschaftsliberale Akzente setzen." (We should think about the 'C' [Christian] and put clear emphasis on economic liberalism).

=== Biblical creationism in biology education ===
Wagner supported in 2007, together with Roland Koch, the publicly criticised project of Karin Wolff to introduce creationism as a component of biology classes. Many public outlets saw in this proposal an attempt to introduce creationism in schools of Hesse, after Wolff had previously stated to see no contradiction between evolution theory and the explanation in the Bible.

== Awards ==
In 1991, Wagner was awarded the Order of Merit of the Federal Republic of Germany (Bundesverdienstkreuz am Bande).
