= Bettina Wiesmann =

German politician (born 1966)

- Wiesmann in 2013

Member of the Bundestag; from Hesse
- In office 26 January 2024 – 25 March 2025
- Preceded by: Armin Schwarz
- Succeeded by: Multi-member district
- Constituency: State list
- In office 24 October 2017 – 26 October 2021
- Preceded by: Erika Steinbach
- Succeeded by: Omid Nouripour
- Constituency: Frankfurt am Main II

Member of the Landtag of Hesse; for Frankfurt am Main V
- In office 5 February 2009 – 31 October 2017
- Preceded by: Michael Paris
- Succeeded by: Bodo Pfaff-Greiffenhagen

Personal details
- Born: Bettina Margarethe Wiesmann; 20 October 1966 (age 59) West Berlin, West Germany
- Party: Christian Democratic Union
- Children: 4
- Education: Sciences Po (DEA); London School of Economics (MSc); University of Pittsburgh (MBA)

Bettina Margarethe Wiesmann (born 20 October 1966) is a German politician of the Christian Democratic Union (CDU). Born in West Berlin, she has served as a member of the Bundestag from the state of Hesse from 2017 to 2021 and again from 2024 to 2025.

== Political career ==
Wiesmann became a member of the Bundestag in the 2017 German federal election. In parliament, she was a member of the Committee on Families, Senior Citizens, Women and Youth.

In 2022, Wiesmann unsuccessfully ran for a seat on the CDU’s national board.

== Other activities ==
- Frankfurt School of Finance & Management, Member of the Advisory Board

== Political positions ==
In 2019, Wiesmann joined 14 members of her parliamentary group who, in an open letter, called for the party to rally around Angela Merkel and party chairwoman Annegret Kramp-Karrenbauer amid criticism voiced by conservatives Friedrich Merz and Roland Koch.
