= Willi Birkelbach =

German politician (1913–2008)

Willi Birkelbach CBE
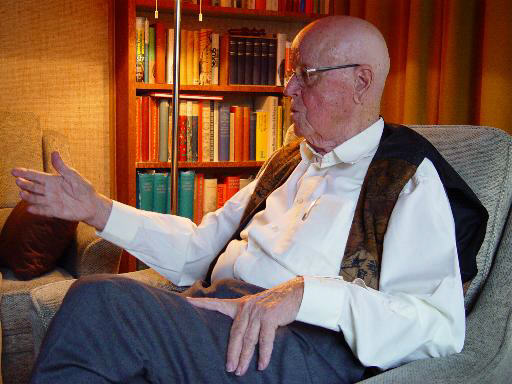
- Birkelbach in 2004

Member of the Bundestag; from Hesse
- In office 7 September 1949 – 30 September 1964
- Preceded by: Constituency established
- Succeeded by: Ladislaus Winterstein
- Constituency: Frankfurt/M II (1949–1953); State list (1953–1961); Frankfurt/M II (1961–1964)

Personal details
- Born: 12 January 1913 Frankfurt, Germany
- Died: 17 July 2008 (aged 95) Frankfurt, Germany
- Party: Social Democratic

Willi Birkelbach CBE (12 January 1913 – 17 July 2008) was a West German politician (SPD). He was a member of the West German Bundestag (national parliament) between 1949 and 1964. Between 1952 and 1964 he also served as an increasingly prominent Member of the European Parliament (and its precursor body).

In 1971 he became the first ever Ombudsman for Data protection in the State of Hessen. The title of the post has changed, most recently in Germany, to Datenschutzbeauftragter (loosely, "Data Protection officer"). Hessen was the first state in West Germany to appoint a "Datenschutzbeauftragter", which means that Willi Birkelbach was the first Data Protection Officer/Commissioner/Registrar in the German Federal Republic.

== Biography ==
=== Early years ===
Willi Birkelbach was born in Höchst (today part of Frankfurt am Main), the son of Johann Birkelbach (1880–1964) by his marriage to Luise Schäfer (1888–1978). Johann Birkelbach worked, at different stages, as a coachman and as a factory worker. He was an active trades unionist and participated, in his later years, in regional politics. Slightly unusually for the time, Willi Birkelnach was the child of a "mixed marriage": Johann Birkelbach was from a Catholic family while Luise Birkelbach was a Protestant.

Willi Birkelbach completed his schooling at a secondary school in 1932 and joined a company called "Marx und Hart" where between 1932 and 1935 he undertook an apprenticeship in business, with a particular focus on foreign trade and industrial accounting. Thus qualified he represented various German firms in Switzerland, France, England and Italy. Businesses for which he worked included "Röhm und Haas" in Darmstadt (1936–1938), Hochtief AG of Frankfurt (1938) and "Kulzer & Co", also of Frankfurt (1941–1942). There were two significant gaps in his employment record during the twelve National Socialist years which relate to his political involvement.

=== Middle years ===
In 1946 he came home to Frankfurt. He returned to "Kulzer & Co" where between 1946 and 1947 he was in charge of the bookkeeping. In 1947 he took over at the DGB (trades union congress) college for State of Hessen, located in Oberursel. He remained in this post till 1950/1951. There was nevertheless a significant break during 1948/49 when he undertook a study trip to the United States, which came with a bursary.

Between 1953 and 1958, he represented the IG Metall union as a member of the supervisory board at Mannesmann AG. Then, till 1978, he took a similar position at the Bochum Steel Works, serving between 1968 and 1978 as deputy board chairman.

== Politics ==
=== Under National Socialism ===
Still aged only 17, Willi Birkelbach joined the Social Democratic Party ("Sozialdemokratische Partei Deutschlands" / SPD) in 1930. Politics were already deeply polarised at the time, with the Reichstag gridlocked by two extremist political parties that would neither work with the mainstream moderate parties nor react to the logic of the 1932 national election results by entering into a Nazi-Communist coalition between themselves. In January 1933 matters nevertheless took a turn for the worse when the National Socialists took power and lost no time in transforming the country into a one-party dictatorship. Political activity - except in support of the government - was banned. Birkelbach, however, worked illegally between 1934 and 1938 for the Socialist Workers' Party ("Sozialistische Arbeiterpartei Deutschlands" / SAP) which had broken away from the mainstream SPD in 1931 in order to push, belatedly, for closer collaboration between Communists and Socialists so as to block a take-over by nationalist populists. On 10 October 1938, Birkelbach was arrested by the Gestapo. He faced the justice system and was charged with preparing to "commit high treason" ("Vorbereitung zum Hochverrat"), which was the usual charge under such circumstances. He was convicted and sentenced to a thirty-month jail term. He spent those thirty months in prisons in Butzbach and Münster. Slightly more than eighteen months following his release, on 15 November 1942, he was conscripted into punishment division 999 ("Strafdivision 999"), a recently created penal military unit intended for fighting in North Africa. However, the fortunes of war moved on, and by the time he was captured he had been sent to fight in Greece. He managed - possibly with others - to desert and join up with Greek partisans, whom he accompanied northwards into Albania. Here he was captured by the British. He spent approximately two years, between 1944 and 1946, as a Prisoner of war. The British took him to a prisoners' camp in Egypt. Most of the other prisoners were also German, and together they set up what they called a "desert university" ("Wüstenuniversität"), studying to prepare, Birkelbach later said, for a postwar return to democratic structures.

=== After 1945 ===
==== National Parliament ====
In August 1949, the newly launched West German Republic held the first democratic general election in which Germans had participated since 1932. Birkelbach was elected an SPD member of it, representing the Frankfurt south-east electoral district, gaining slightly less than 40% of the constituency vote and comfortably out-polling his CDU and FPD rival candidates. He remained a Bundestag member till retiring from the chamber on 30 September 1964. Due to the national election results during those fifteen years he was always in opposition, however.

==== European parliament ====
Between 1952 and 1964, he was also a member - and from 1959 to 1964 chairman - of the Socialist group in the European Parliament.

In December 1961, Birkelbach headed up a European Parliamentary Commission mandated to recommend the criteria for new member states. The resulting "Birkelbach Report" covered geographic and economic criteria, but it also extended to political considerations such as democracy and the rule of law. In January 1962 the report was accepted in a cross-party basis. Following the report Spain made a formal request for talks, Birkelbach became the first European Parliamentarian to pose an oral question to the commission, questioning the commission's position regarding the accession of non-democratic countries. A few months later the report was used to support the rejection of Francoist Spain as a membership candidate.

==== Party ====
Between 1954 and 1963, he was regional SPD (party) chairman for Hessen-South, and between 1954 and 1958 he was a member of the national party executive. Partly in response to the way in which the party seemed to be locked in permanent opposition on the national stage, and partly because developments in East Germany had led to "socialism" becoming confused in the minds of many with a Soviet expansionist foreign policy, the 1950s were a period of intense soul-searching within the SPD. That was crystallised in five years of relatively structured internal debate which resulted in the 1959 publication of the Godesberg Program which rejected the goal of replacing capitalism, instead adopting a commitment to "reform capitalism". Brikelbach himself is identified in some sources as one of the (many) authors of the report. Willi Birkelbach lined up with Wolfgang Abendroth, accepting the need for modernisation, but without abandoning the party's socialist core. By 1958 Birkelbach was finding himself increasingly at odds with the party leadership over the Godesberg process, and that year he did not seek re-election to the SPD national party executive.

He nevertheless remained actively engaged with the party. In 2005, now more than ninety years old, he was still appearing as a speaker in Frankfurt during the General Election campaign.

==== Other public offices ====
From 1964 to 1969, Birkelbach was employed as a secretary of state and, in effect, the head of the State Chancelry of the State of Hessen. During this time he employed Christel Guillaume as a senior typist-secretary, with a desk directly outside his own office. It later emerged that Christel Guillaume was working for East German intelligence, and in 1974 she was sentenced to an eight-year prison term for espionage. She was sent back to East Germany where she was feted as a peace-scout ("Kundschafterin des Friedens") in 1981 as part of a wider "spy-swap". Outside Germany she is better known to historians and commentators as the wife of Günter Guillaume, whose own espionage activities led to the political downfall of Chancellor Brandt.

Between 1966 and 1976, Birkelbach was a member of the broadcasting council of the Frankfurt-based public broadcaster, Hessischer Rundfunk, as a representative of the state government.

In 1971, Willi Birkelbach became the first ever Ombudsman for Data protection in the State of Hessen. The Data Protection Act for the state of Hessen, widely seen as the world's first statute on data protection, had been authored by a Frankfurt law professor called Spiros Simitis. Simitis was installed as Birkelbach's deputy and there was a widespread perception that Simitis was the real moving force in the new department, but Simitis, despite having been educated in West Germany, was Greek. (Greece was not yet a member of the European Community.) In 1975 Spiros Simitis belatedly obtained West German citizenship and took over as Chief Data Protection Officer for the State of Hessen. Birkelbach retired. But it was Birkelbach who enjoyed the distinction of being the first Data Protection Commissioner anywhere in the German Federal Republic.

== Awards and honours (selection) ==
- 1973 William Leuschner Medal from the State of Hessen
- 1991 Johnna Kirchner Medal
- 2001 Order of Merit of the Federal Republic of Germany
- 2005 Willy Brandt Medal of the SPD
- Honorary Commander of the Most Excellent Order of the British Empire
