= Frankfurt am Main II =

Federal electoral district of Germany

182 Frankfurt am Main II
- Electoral district for the Bundestag
- Frankfurt am Main II in 2025
- State: Hesse
- Population: 383,200 (2019)
- Electorate: 227,207 (2021)
- Major settlements: Frankfurt am Main (partial)
- Area: 163.2 km^{2}

Current electoral district
- Created: 1949
- Member: Vacant
- Elected: 2025

Frankfurt am Main II is an electoral constituency (German: Wahlkreis) represented in the Bundestag. It elects one member via first-past-the-post voting. Under the current constituency numbering system, it is designated as constituency 182. It is located in southern Hesse, comprising the eastern part of the city of Frankfurt am Main.

Frankfurt am Main II was created for the inaugural 1949 federal election. From 2021 to 2025, it was represented by Omid Nouripour of the Alliance 90/The Greens.

== Geography ==
Frankfurt am Main II is located in southern Hesse. As of the 2021 federal election, it comprises the Ortsbezirke of Innenstadt III, Bornheim/Ostend, Süd, West (only Schwanheim Ortsteil), Nord-Ost, Ost, Kalbach-Riedberg, Nieder-Erlenbach, Harheim, Nieder-Eschbach, and Bergen-Enkheim from the independent city of Frankfurt am Main.

== History ==
Frankfurt am Main II was created in 1949, then known as Frankfurt/M II. From 1965 through 1972, it was named Frankfurt II. In the 1976 election, it was named Frankfurt (Main) II. It acquired its current name in the 1980 election. In the 1949 election, it was Hesse constituency 16 in the numbering system. From 1953 through 1976, it was number 141. From 1980 through 1998, it was number 139. In the 2002 and 2005 elections, it was number 184. In the 2009 through 2021 elections, it was number 183. From the 2025 election, it has been number 182.

Originally, the constituency comprised the Stadtbezirke of Innenstadt, Gutleutviertel, Gallusviertel, Rebstock, Westend, Bockenheim, Rödelheim, Hausen, Praunheim, Heddernheim, Ginnheim, Eschersheim, and Niederursel from the city of Frankfurt am Main. In the 1976 through 1998 elections, it comprised the Stadtbezirke of Innenstadt, Gutleutviertel, Gallusviertel, Westend, Bockenheim, Heddernheim, Ginnheim, Eschersheim, Niederursel, Sachsenhausen, Niederrad, Goldstein-Ost, Altstadt, Bahnhofsviertel, Kalbach, and Dornbusch-West from the city of Frankfurt am Main. It acquired its current borders in the 2002 election.

Election	No.	Name	Borders
1949	16	Frankfurt/M II	Frankfurt am Main city (only Innenstadt, Gutleutviertel, Gallusviertel, Rebstock, Westend, Bockenheim, Rödelheim, Hausen, Praunheim, Heddernheim, Ginnheim, Eschersheim, and Niederursel Stadtbezirke)
1953	141	Frankfurt/M II	Frankfurt am Main city (only Innenstadt, Gutleutviertel, Gallusviertel, Rebstock, Westend, Bockenheim, Rödelheim, Hausen, Praunheim, Heddernheim, Ginnheim, Eschersheim, and Niederursel Stadtbezirke)
1957	141	Frankfurt/M II	Frankfurt am Main city (only Innenstadt, Gutleutviertel, Gallusviertel, Rebstock, Westend, Bockenheim, Rödelheim, Hausen, Praunheim, Heddernheim, Ginnheim, Eschersheim, and Niederursel Stadtbezirke)
1961	141	Frankfurt/M II	Frankfurt am Main city (only Innenstadt, Gutleutviertel, Gallusviertel, Rebstock, Westend, Bockenheim, Rödelheim, Hausen, Praunheim, Heddernheim, Ginnheim, Eschersheim, and Niederursel Stadtbezirke)
1965	141	Frankfurt II	Frankfurt am Main city (only Innenstadt, Gutleutviertel, Gallusviertel, Rebstock, Westend, Bockenheim, Rödelheim, Hausen, Praunheim, Heddernheim, Ginnheim, Eschersheim, and Niederursel Stadtbezirke)
1969	141	Frankfurt II	Frankfurt am Main city (only Innenstadt, Gutleutviertel, Gallusviertel, Rebstock, Westend, Bockenheim, Rödelheim, Hausen, Praunheim, Heddernheim, Ginnheim, Eschersheim, and Niederursel Stadtbezirke)
1972	141	Frankfurt II	Frankfurt am Main city (only Innenstadt, Gutleutviertel, Gallusviertel, Rebstock, Westend, Bockenheim, Rödelheim, Hausen, Praunheim, Heddernheim, Ginnheim, Eschersheim, and Niederursel Stadtbezirke)
1976	141	Frankfurt (Main) II	Frankfurt am Main city (only Innenstadt, Gutleutviertel, Gallusviertel, Westend, Bockenheim, Heddernheim, Ginnheim, Eschersheim, Niederursel, Sachsenhausen, Niederrad, Goldstein-Ost, Altstadt, Bahnhofsviertel, Kalbach, and Dornbusch-West Stadtbezirke)
1980	139	Frankfurt am Main II	Frankfurt am Main city (only Innenstadt, Gutleutviertel, Gallusviertel, Westend, Bockenheim, Heddernheim, Ginnheim, Eschersheim, Niederursel, Sachsenhausen, Niederrad, Goldstein-Ost, Altstadt, Bahnhofsviertel, Kalbach, and Dornbusch-West Stadtbezirke)
1983	139	Frankfurt am Main II	Frankfurt am Main city (only Innenstadt, Gutleutviertel, Gallusviertel, Westend, Bockenheim, Heddernheim, Ginnheim, Eschersheim, Niederursel, Sachsenhausen, Niederrad, Goldstein-Ost, Altstadt, Bahnhofsviertel, Kalbach, and Dornbusch-West Stadtbezirke)
1987	139	Frankfurt am Main II	Frankfurt am Main city (only Innenstadt, Gutleutviertel, Gallusviertel, Westend, Bockenheim, Heddernheim, Ginnheim, Eschersheim, Niederursel, Sachsenhausen, Niederrad, Goldstein-Ost, Altstadt, Bahnhofsviertel, Kalbach, and Dornbusch-West Stadtbezirke)
1990	139	Frankfurt am Main II	Frankfurt am Main city (only Innenstadt, Gutleutviertel, Gallusviertel, Westend, Bockenheim, Heddernheim, Ginnheim, Eschersheim, Niederursel, Sachsenhausen, Niederrad, Goldstein-Ost, Altstadt, Bahnhofsviertel, Kalbach, and Dornbusch-West Stadtbezirke)
1994	139	Frankfurt am Main II	Frankfurt am Main city (only Innenstadt, Gutleutviertel, Gallusviertel, Westend, Bockenheim, Heddernheim, Ginnheim, Eschersheim, Niederursel, Sachsenhausen, Niederrad, Goldstein-Ost, Altstadt, Bahnhofsviertel, Kalbach, and Dornbusch-West Stadtbezirke)
1998	139	Frankfurt am Main II	Frankfurt am Main city (only Innenstadt, Gutleutviertel, Gallusviertel, Westend, Bockenheim, Heddernheim, Ginnheim, Eschersheim, Niederursel, Sachsenhausen, Niederrad, Goldstein-Ost, Altstadt, Bahnhofsviertel, Kalbach, and Dornbusch-West Stadtbezirke)
2002	184	Frankfurt am Main II	Frankfurt am Main city (only Innenstadt III, Bornheim/Ostend, Süd, West (only Schwanheim Ortsteil), Nord-Ost, Ost, Kalbach-Riedberg, Nieder-Erlenbach, Harheim, Nieder-Eschbach, and Bergen-Enkheim Ortsbezirke)
2005	184	Frankfurt am Main II	Frankfurt am Main city (only Innenstadt III, Bornheim/Ostend, Süd, West (only Schwanheim Ortsteil), Nord-Ost, Ost, Kalbach-Riedberg, Nieder-Erlenbach, Harheim, Nieder-Eschbach, and Bergen-Enkheim Ortsbezirke)
2009	183	Frankfurt am Main II	Frankfurt am Main city (only Innenstadt III, Bornheim/Ostend, Süd, West (only Schwanheim Ortsteil), Nord-Ost, Ost, Kalbach-Riedberg, Nieder-Erlenbach, Harheim, Nieder-Eschbach, and Bergen-Enkheim Ortsbezirke)
2013	183	Frankfurt am Main II	Frankfurt am Main city (only Innenstadt III, Bornheim/Ostend, Süd, West (only Schwanheim Ortsteil), Nord-Ost, Ost, Kalbach-Riedberg, Nieder-Erlenbach, Harheim, Nieder-Eschbach, and Bergen-Enkheim Ortsbezirke)
2017	183	Frankfurt am Main II	Frankfurt am Main city (only Innenstadt III, Bornheim/Ostend, Süd, West (only Schwanheim Ortsteil), Nord-Ost, Ost, Kalbach-Riedberg, Nieder-Erlenbach, Harheim, Nieder-Eschbach, and Bergen-Enkheim Ortsbezirke)
2021	183	Frankfurt am Main II	Frankfurt am Main city (only Innenstadt III, Bornheim/Ostend, Süd, West (only Schwanheim Ortsteil), Nord-Ost, Ost, Kalbach-Riedberg, Nieder-Erlenbach, Harheim, Nieder-Eschbach, and Bergen-Enkheim Ortsbezirke)
2025	182	Frankfurt am Main II	Frankfurt am Main city (only Innenstadt III, Bornheim/Ostend, Süd, West (only Schwanheim Ortsteil), Nord-Ost, Ost, Kalbach-Riedberg, Nieder-Erlenbach, Harheim, Nieder-Eschbach, and Bergen-Enkheim Ortsbezirke)

== Members ==
The constituency was first represented by Willi Birkelbach of the Social Democratic Party (SPD) from 1949 to 1953, followed by Walter Leiske of the Christian Democratic Union (CDU) from 1953 to 1961. Former member Birkelbach won it back and served another term from 1961 to 1965. Brigitte Freyh of the SPD was then representative from 1965 to 1972, when she was succeeded by party fellow Fred Zander. Karl Becker of the CDU was representative for one term from 1976 to 1980, when former member Zander regained it for the SPD. Becker was then elected in 1983 and re-elected in 1987. Joachim Gres succeeded him in 1990 for two terms. Gudrun Schaich-Walch won the constituency for the SPD in 1998 and served one term; Rita Streb-Hesse held it for the SPD in 2002. Erika Steinbach of the CDU was representative from 2005 to 2017. Bettina Wiesmann of the CDU was elected in 2017. Omid Nouripour won the constituency for the Greens in 2021.

Election	Member	Party	%
1949	Willi Birkelbach	SPD	39.3
1953	Walter Leiske	CDU	39.3
1957	Walter Leiske	CDU	45.7
1961	Willi Birkelbach	SPD	42.6
1965	Brigitte Freyh	SPD	45.8
1969	Brigitte Freyh	SPD	52.1
1972	Fred Zander	SPD	51.8
1976	Karl Becker	CDU	45.3
1980	Fred Zander	SPD	44.4
1983	Karl Becker	CDU	48.1
1987	Karl Becker	CDU	45.6
1990	Joachim Gres	CDU	43.4
1994	Joachim Gres	CDU	45.3
1998	Gudrun Schaich-Walch	SPD	41.7
2002	Rita Streb-Hesse	SPD	35.6
2005	Erika Steinbach	CDU	37.3
2009	Erika Steinbach	CDU	35.8
2013	Erika Steinbach	CDU	36.3
2017	Bettina Wiesmann	CDU	32.4
2021	Omid Nouripour	GRÜNE	29.0
2025	Vacant (Note: Leopold Born (CDU) won with 27.4% but seat remained vacant due to insufficient second votes cover.)		

== Election results ==
=== 2025 election ===
Federal election (2025): Frankfurt am Main II
Notes:	Blue background denotes the winner of the electorate vote. Pink background denotes a candidate elected from their party list. Yellow background denotes an electorate win by a list member, or other incumbent. A ✓ or ✗ denotes status of any incumbent, win or lose respectively.						
Party	Candidate	Votes	%	±%	Party votes	%	±%
CDU	Leopold Born	52,042	27.4	▲4.9	47,486	24.9	▲6.7
Greens	✗ Omid Nouripour	50,303	26.4	▼2.5	39,503	20.7	▼4.8
SPD	Lena Voigt	35,099	18.5	▼4.9	32,775	17.2	▼5.1
Left	Michael Müller	18,794	9.9	▲3.7	25,783	13.5	▲6.7
AfD	John Csapó	17,451	9.2	▲4.6	17,799	9.3	▲4.6
FDP	Thorsten Lieb	8,768	4.6	▼6.8	12,532	6.6	▼8.1
BSW					8,413	4.4	New
Volt	Johannes Hauenschild	3,207	1.7	New	2,351	1.2	▼0.3
Tierschutzpartei					1,411	0.7	▼0.3
PARTEI	Michael Götz-Pijl	1,849	1.0	New	976	0.5	▼0.4
FW	Eric Pärisch	1,501	0.8	▼0.6	961	0.5	▼0.4
Independent	Yunus Emre	440	0.2	New			
BD	Christian Selbach	532	0.3	New	298	0.2	New
Humanists					225	0.1	0.0
MLPD	Meik Schoepping	224	0.1	0.0	67	<0.1	0.0
Informal votes		1,489			1,119		
Total valid votes		190,210			190,580		
Turnout		191,699	82.9	▲5.9			
CDU gain from Greens	Majority	1,739	1.0	N/A			

=== 2021 election ===
Federal election (2021): Frankfurt am Main II
Notes:	Blue background denotes the winner of the electorate vote. Pink background denotes a candidate elected from their party list. Yellow background denotes an electorate win by a list member, or other incumbent. A ✓ or ✗ denotes status of any incumbent, win or lose respectively.						
Party	Candidate	Votes	%	±%	Party votes	%	±%
Greens	Omid Nouripour	50,230	29.0	▲15.5	44,370	25.6	▲10.1
SPD	Kaweh Mansoori	40,431	23.3	▼2.6	38,777	22.3	▲2.7
CDU	✗ Bettina Wiesmann	38,995	22.5	▼9.9	31,660	18.2	▼8.5
FDP	Thorsten Lieb	19,766	11.4	▲3.3	25,530	14.7	▲0.5
Left	Achim Kessler	10,629	6.1	▼3.0	11,901	6.9	▼4.9
AfD	Joana Cotar	7,990	4.6	▼3.0	8,188	4.7	▼3.3
Volt					2,674	1.5	
Team Todenhöfer					1,965	1.1	
dieBasis	Konstantinos Marketakis	2,547	1.5		1,923	1.1	
Tierschutzpartei					1,754	1.0	▲0.1
PARTEI					1,565	0.9	▼0.3
FW	Dieter Breidt	2,478	1.4	▲0.8	1,512	0.9	▲0.4
Pirates					686	0.4	0.0
V-Partei3					201	0.1	▼0.1
Gesundheitsforschung					190	0.1	
Humanists					190	0.1	
Bündnis C					134	0.1	
ÖDP					128	0.1	▼0.1
DKP					87	0.1	0.0
NPD					76	0.0	▼0.1
LKR					56	0.0	
MLPD	Tufan Aydin	186	0.1	0.0	48	0.0	0.0
Bündnis 21					36	0.0	
Informal votes		1,752			1,353		
Total valid votes		173,252			173,651		
Turnout		175,004	77.0	0.0			
Greens gain from CDU	Majority	9,799	5.7				

=== 2017 election ===
Federal election (2017): Frankfurt am Main II
Notes:	Blue background denotes the winner of the electorate vote. Pink background denotes a candidate elected from their party list. Yellow background denotes an electorate win by a list member, or other incumbent. A ✓ or ✗ denotes status of any incumbent, win or lose respectively.						
Party	Candidate	Votes	%	±%	Party votes	%	±%
CDU	Bettina Wiesmann	55,221	32.4	▼3.9	45,731	26.8	▼7.1
SPD	Ulli Nissen	44,240	25.9	▼4.5	33,511	19.6	▼6.7
Greens	Omid Nouripour	23,026	13.5	0.0	26,415	15.5	▲0.1
Left	Monika Brigitte Cristann	15,523	9.1	▲3.0	20,059	11.7	▲3.6
FDP	Katharina Schreiner	13,877	8.1	▲4.7	24,336	14.3	▲7.3
AfD	Steffen Reichmann	13,033	7.6	▲4.4	13,737	8.0	▲3.2
PARTEI	Leo Fischer	3,221	1.9	▲1.2	2,065	1.2	▲0.6
Tierschutzpartei					1,577	0.9	
Pirates	Sebastian Alscher	1,226	0.7	▼1.1	762	0.4	▼1.7
FW	Karlheinz Grabmann	1,026	0.6	0.0	736	0.4	▼0.2
BGE					435	0.3	
V-Partei³					364	0.2	
ÖDP					295	0.2	
NPD					265	0.2	▼0.4
DM					250	0.1	
MLPD	Bernadette Leidinger-Beierle	176	0.1		114	0.1	0.0
DKP					91	0.1	
BüSo					30	0.0	0.0
Informal votes		1,824			1,620		
Total valid votes		170,569			170,773		
Turnout		172,393	77.0	▲4.1			
CDU hold	Majority	10,981	6.5	▲0.7			

=== 2013 election ===
Federal election (2013): Frankfurt am Main II
Notes:	Blue background denotes the winner of the electorate vote. Pink background denotes a candidate elected from their party list. Yellow background denotes an electorate win by a list member, or other incumbent. A ✓ or ✗ denotes status of any incumbent, win or lose respectively.						
Party	Candidate	Votes	%	±%	Party votes	%	±%
CDU	✓ Erika Steinbach	57,004	36.3	▲0.6	53,198	33.9	▲6.0
SPD	Ulli Nissen	47,854	30.5	▲1.2	41,360	26.3	▲4.8
Greens	Omid Nouripour	21,184	13.5	▼1.7	24,165	15.4	▼2.9
Left	Wolfgang Gehrcke	9,547	6.1	▼1.7	12,778	8.1	▼1.8
FDP	Christoph Schnurr	5,434	3.5	▼5.9	10,979	7.0	▼10.5
AfD	Erich Heinrich Heidkamp	5,155	3.3		7,669	4.9	
Independent	Michael Paris	4,682	3.0				
Pirates	Christian Bethke	2,858	1.8		3,426	2.2	▼0.2
PARTEI	Leo Fischer	1,155	0.7		1,006	0.6	
NPD	Günter Reinhard Ulrich	1,015	0.6	▼0.4	930	0.6	▼0.2
FW	Kai-Sören Kehrmann	988	0.6		932	0.6	
REP					235	0.1	▼0.3
PRO					125	0.1	
BüSo	Klaus Fimmen	101	0.1	▼0.2	87	0.1	▼0.1
SGP					69	0.0	
MLPD					54	0.0	0.0
Informal votes		2,937			2,901		
Total valid votes		156,977			157,013		
Turnout		159,914	72.9	▼0.9			
CDU hold	Majority	9,150	5.8	▼0.7			

=== 2009 election ===
Federal election (2009): Frankfurt am Main II
Notes:	Blue background denotes the winner of the electorate vote. Pink background denotes a candidate elected from their party list. Yellow background denotes an electorate win by a list member, or other incumbent. A ✓ or ✗ denotes status of any incumbent, win or lose respectively.						
Party	Candidate	Votes	%	±%	Party votes	%	±%
CDU	✓ Erika Steinbach	55,027	35.8	▼1.5	43,089	27.9	▼1.2
SPD	Ulli Nissen	45,074	29.3	▼4.5	33,243	21.5	▼8.3
Greens	Omid Nouripour	23,403	15.2	▼3.5	28,225	18.3	▲0.8
FDP	Christoph Schnurr	14,336	9.3	▲5.0	27,031	17.5	▲3.7
Left	Wolfgang Gehrcke	11,998	7.8	▲3.1	15,397	10.0	▲3.5
Pirates					3,722	2.4	
Tierschutzpartei	Friederike Prüll	2,077	1.3		1,503	1.0	▲0.1
NPD	Jörg Krebs	1,546	1.0	▼0.3	1,183	0.8	▼0.1
REP					651	0.4	▼0.2
BüSo	Klaus Fimmen	416	0.3		190	0.1	▲0.1
DVU					102	0.1	
MLPD					62	0.0	0.0
Informal votes		2,671			2,150		
Total valid votes		153,877			154,398		
Turnout		156,548	73.8	▼3.5			
CDU hold	Majority	9,953	6.5	▲2.9			

=== 2005 election ===
Federal election (2005):Frankfurt am Main II
Notes:	Blue background denotes the winner of the electorate vote. Pink background denotes a candidate elected from their party list. Yellow background denotes an electorate win by a list member, or other incumbent. A ✓ or ✗ denotes status of any incumbent, win or lose respectively.						
Party	Candidate	Votes	%	±%	Party votes	%	±%
CDU	Erika Steinbach	57,539	37.3	▲1.9	45,133	29.1	▼3.6
SPD	Frank Schmidt	52,063	33.7	▼1.9	46,265	29.9	▼4.1
Greens	Joschka Fischer	28,925	18.8	▼1.7	27,117	17.5	▼1.8
Left	Wolfgang Gehrcke	7,188	4.7	▲2.7	10,029	6.5	▲4.1
FDP	Hermann Schaus	6,591	4.3	▼0.1	21,432	13.8	▲5.2
NPD	Jörg Krebs	1,957	1.3		1,395	0.9	▲0.6
Tierschutzpartei					1,287	0.8	▲0.1
GRAUEN					979	0.6	▲0.4
REP					913	0.6	0.0
BüSo					111	0.1	0.0
SGP					105	0.1	
MLPD					82	0.1	
Informal votes		3,192			2,607		
Total valid votes		154,263			154,848		
Turnout		157,455	77.3	▼0.9			
CDU gain from SPD	Majority	5,476	3.6				
