= Thorsten Lieb =

German politician

Thorsten Lieb (born 3 January 1973) is a German lawyer and politician of the Free Democratic Party (FDP) who has been serving as a member of the Bundestag since 2021.

== Early life and education ==
Lieb was born 1973 in the West German town of Bad Kreuznach and studied law in order to become a lawyer.

== Political career ==
Lieb entered the liberal FDP in 1998. He later became the chairman of the FDP in Frankfurt.

Lieb ran unsuccessfully in the European elections of 2014 and 2019 but was elected to the Bundestag in 2021, representing the Frankfurt am Main II district. In parliament, he has since been serving on the Committee on Legal Affairs and its Subcommittee on European Law as well as on the Budget Committee and its Subcommittee on European Affairs. In 2022, he also joined the parliamentary body charged with overseeing a 100 billion euro special fund to strengthen Germany’s armed forces.

In addition to his committee assignments, Lieb has been co-chairing the German-Italian Parliamentary Friendship Group since 2022.
