= Helmut Link =

German politician (1927–2009)

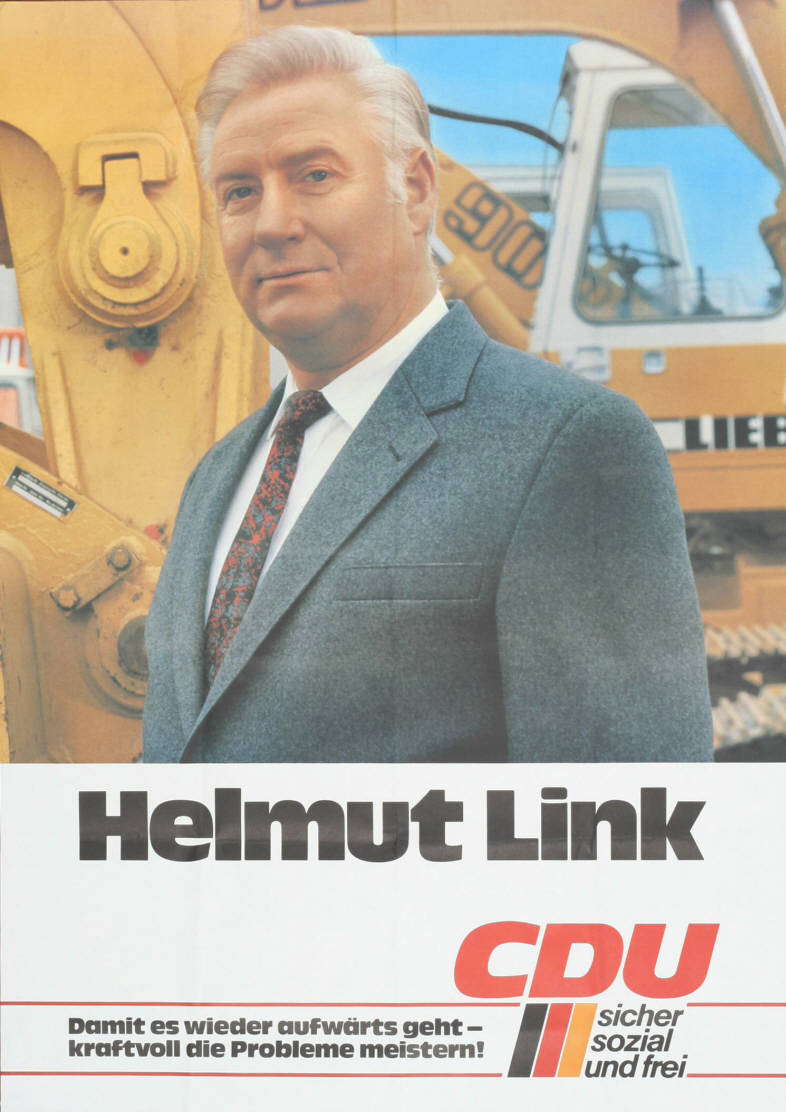
- Helmut Link on a candidate poster for the 1983 federal elections

Member of the Bundestag; from Hesse
- In office 20 October 1969 – 20 December 1990
- Preceded by: Multi-member district
- Succeeded by: Erika Steinbach
- Constituency: State list (1969–1983); Frankfurt am Main III (1983–1990)

Personal details
- Born: 6 February 1927 Frankfurt, Germany
- Died: 26 February 2009 (aged 82)
- Party: Christian Democratic Union
- Children: 1

Helmut Link (6 February 1927 – 26 February 2009) was a German politician of the Christian Democratic Union (CDU) and former member of the German Bundestag.

== Political career ==
Link joined the CDU in 1957 and was a member of the Frankfurt city council for the CDU from 1960 to 1969. In the 1969 federal elections Link was elected to the German Bundestag via the Hessian state list of the CDU. Link remained a member of the German Bundestag until 1990 and was initially always elected via the Hessian state list. In 1983 and 1987 he was elected directly in the Bundestag election district Frankfurt am Main III.

== Literature ==
Herbst, Ludolf; Jahn, Bruno (2002). Vierhaus, Rudolf (ed.). Biographisches Handbuch der Mitglieder des Deutschen Bundestages. 1949–2002 [Biographical Handbook of the Members of the German Bundestag. 1949–2002] (in German). München: De Gruyter - De Gruyter Saur. p. 1715. ISBN 978-3-11-184511-1.
