= Peter Glotz =

German politician (1939–2005)

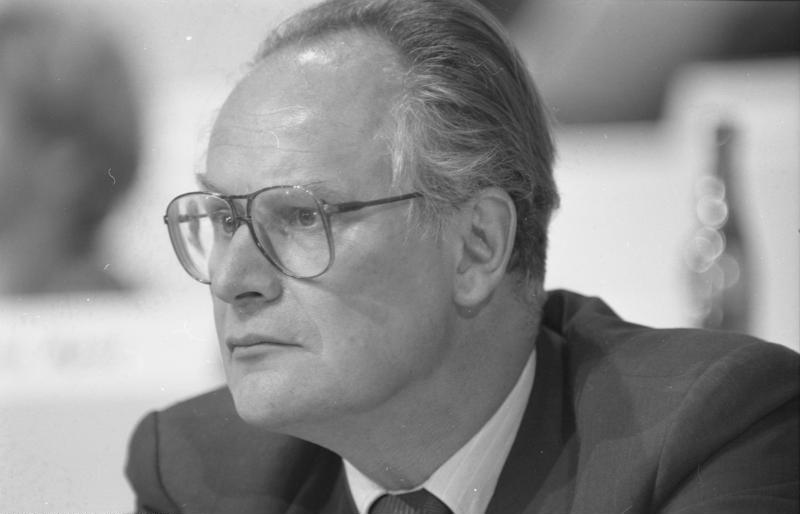
- Peter Glotz

Member of the Bundestag
- In office 1972–1977
- In office 1983–1996

Secretary of State of the Federal Minister for Education and Research
- In office 1974–1977

Senator for Science and Research in the state of Berlin
- In office 1977–1981

Secretary general of the SPD
- In office 1981–1987

Personal details
- Born: 6 March 1939 Cheb, Czechoslovakia
- Died: 25 August 2005 (aged 66) Zürich, Switzerland
- Party: SPD

Peter Glotz (6 March 1939 – 25 August 2005) was a German social democratic politician and social scientist.

== Biography ==
Peter Glotz was born in Cheb, Czechoslovakia, to a German father and a Czech mother. His father, an insurance clerk joined the Nazi Party and administered a small "Aryanized" Jewish factory in Prague. His family was expelled from Czechoslovakia in September 1945 and settled in Franconia. He studied Journalism, Philosophy, Germanistics, and Sociology at LMU Munich and the University of Vienna, and became a doctor of philosophy in 1968.

Glotz became director of LMU Munich in 1969 and a member of the Landtag of Bavaria in 1970. He was a member of the German parliament from 1972 to 1977 and a parliamentary state secretary of the Federal Minister for Education and Research from 1974 until 1977.

From 1977 to 1981 Glotz was a senator for science and research in the state of Berlin, and became a member of the parliament again in 1983, resigning in 1996. He was secretary general of the SPD from 1981 to 1987. Glotz then became founding director of the University of Erfurt (1996–1999) and professor of communication sciences.

From January 2000 until he died in Zürich, Glotz was a Professor of media and society at the University of St. Gallen in Switzerland. In 2002, he was a representative of the German Chancellor to the European Convention. With Erika Steinbach, he was chairman of the Centre Against Expulsions Foundation.

== Selected works ==
- Der Weg der Sozialdemokratie – the author takes on the ardent young socialists in his constituency
- Die deutsche Rechte, Eine Streitschrift, DVA
- Der Irrweg des Nationalstaats. Europäische Reden an ein deutsches Publikum, DVA
- Manifest für eine Neue Europäische Linke, Wolf Jost Siedler Verlag, Berlin 1985 – Manifesto for a new European left
- “Democracy? The Threatened Utopia: An Interview with Norberto Bobbio”. Telos 82 (Winter 1989–90). New York: Telos Press.
- Die Linke nach dem Sieg des Westens, DVA 1992
- Die beschleunigte Gesellschaft: Kulturkämpfe im digitalen Kapitalismus, Kindler 1999
- Von Analog nach Digital: Unsere Gesellschaft auf dem Weg zur digitalen Kultur, Huber 2000
- Ron Sommer: Der Weg der Telekom, Hoffmann und Campe 2001
- Die Vertreibung – Böhmen als Lehrstück, Ullstein 2003
