= Wolfgang Gehrcke =

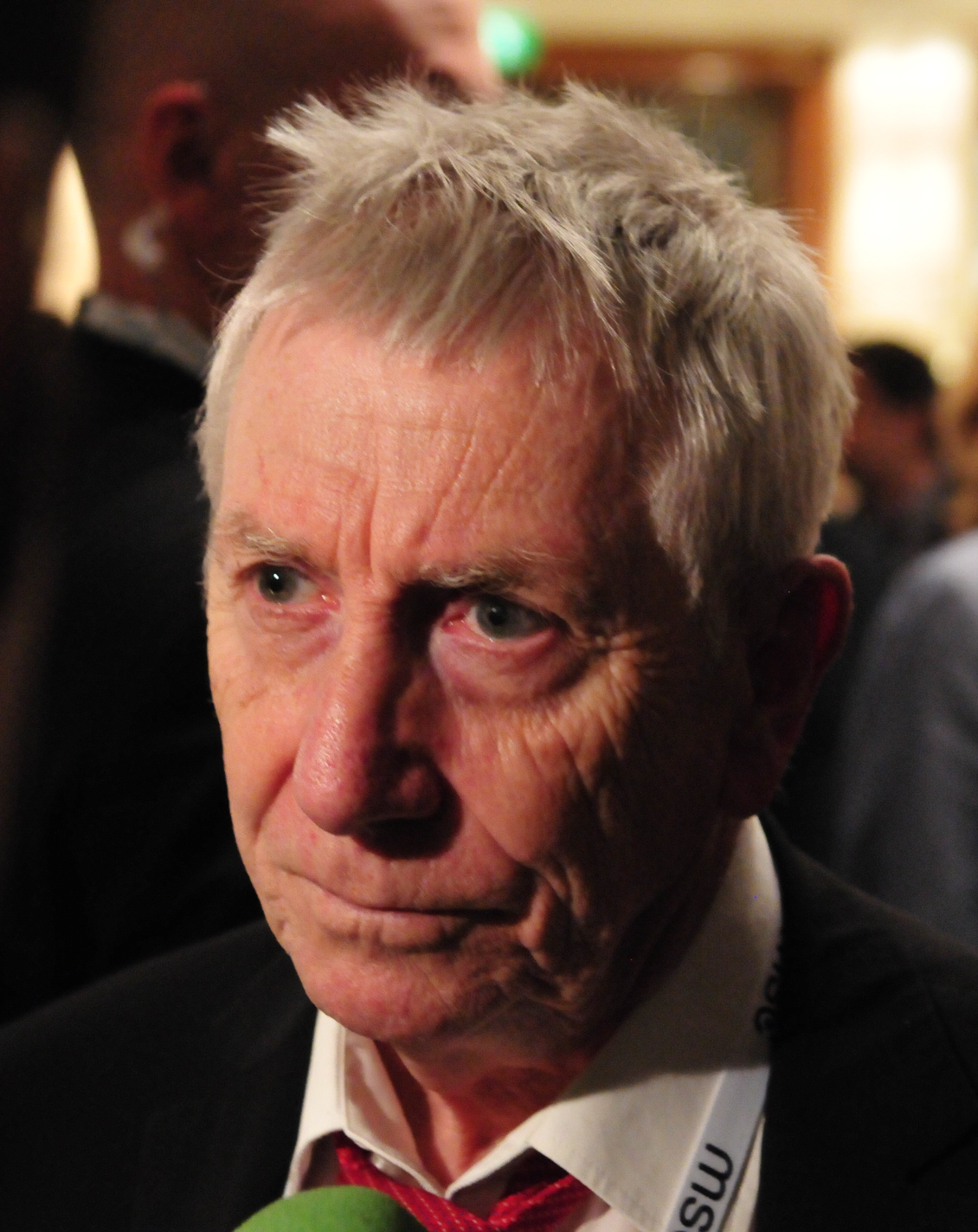
Gehrke in 2015

Wolfgang Gehrcke (born 8 September 1943 in Boos, Bavaria) is a German left-wing politician. Starting in the 1980s, he has held many high positions in his political parties and has been a member of the Bundestag from 1998 to 2002 and again from 2005 to 2017 after a brief year in the Landtag of Brandenburg.

== Life ==
Wolfgang Gehrcke was born 8 September 1943 in Reichau in Boos, Bavaria. From 1950 to 1959, he visited the Volksschule and studied administration from 1959 to 1961, working in such a position at the Bundesagentur für Arbeit (Federal Employment Agency) until 1968. In the following years, he worked in various professional activities in publishing, as a journalist and in political functions.

=== Political career ===
Gehrke joined the Communist Party of Germany (KPD) in 1961, shortly after it had been officially banned in 1956 and was then an underground organisation. He co-founded the Socialist German Workers Youth (SDAJ), of which he was the deputy chairman from 1968 to 1974, then federal chairman until 1979. In, Gehrke was a founding member of the German Communist Party (DKP), the KPD's de facto successor organisation to the KPD. From 1973 to 1989, he was in the DKP's party executive, at times member of the executive committee. From 1981 to 1989, he was the district chairman of the DKP Hamburg, before leaving the DKP in 1990 to join the Party of Democratic Socialism (PDS). In that party, he was the federal managing director (from 1991 to 1993), the deputy federal chairman (from 1993 to 1998), and later spokesman for foreign policy and international cooperation. In 2004, he was a founding member of the Party of the European Left.

In the 1980s and 1990s he was involved in political activism in various movements, including the Easter March movement, the peace movement, being committed to German-German youth relations and cooperation between youth organisations from Eastern and Western Europe.

==== Elections ====
Gehrke was a member of the German Bundestag for a total of 16 years, standing for the constituency of Frankfurt am Main II. He first became a member of the 14th German Bundestag (1998-2002) in the 1998 federal election. He lost his seat in the 2002 election but was re-elected in 2005 - to the 16th Bundestag. He retained his seat in the following two elections (the 17th in 2009, the 18th in 2013) until he decided not to seek re-election in the 19th Bundestag election in 2017. During his time in the parliament, he was most notably Chairman of the Committee on Foreign Affairs (2005+).

=== Other affiliations ===
Gehrke is a member of ver.di.

== Personal life ==
An atheist, he is married and has a daughter.
