= Guillaume affair =

Espionage case

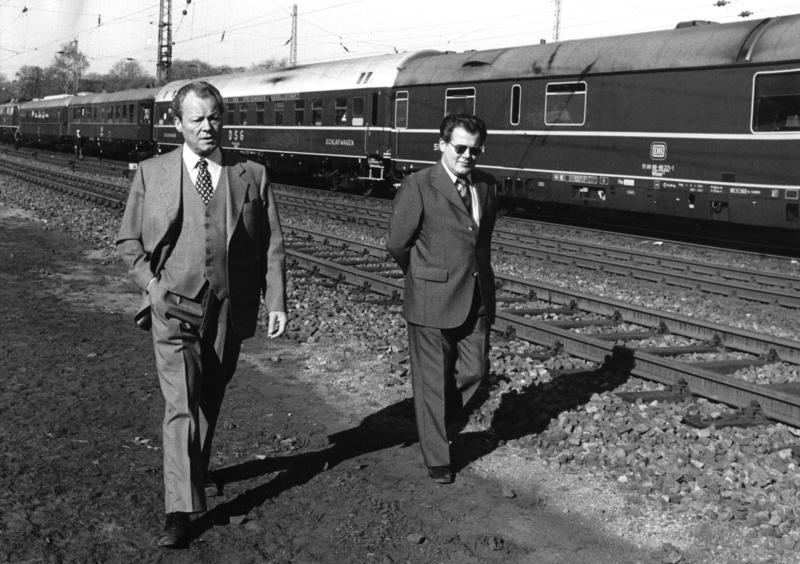
Brandt and Guillaume, 1974

The Guillaume affair (German: Guillaume-Affäre) was an espionage scandal in Germany during the Cold War. The scandal revolved around the exposure of an East German spy within the West German government and had far-reaching political repercussions in Germany, the most prominent being the resignation of West German Chancellor Willy Brandt in 1974.

Around 1973, West German security organizations received information that one of Brandt's personal assistants, Günter Guillaume, was a spy for the East German state. Brandt was asked to continue work as usual, and he agreed, even taking a private vacation with Guillaume. Guillaume was arrested on 24 April 1974.

Guillaume had been a spy for East Germany, supervised by Markus Wolf, head of the Main Intelligence Administration of the East German Ministry for State Security (Stasi). Brandt resigned as Chancellor on 6 May 1974, although he remained the chairman of the Social Democratic Party of Germany (SPD) and led the party until 1987. According to Vasili Mitrokhin, when the KGB found out about Guillaume, they ordered Wolf to pull him out because Brandt had been a good friend to the Soviet Union and they wanted him to stay in power.

== Exposure ==
Guillaume was exposed due to congratulations sent to the Guillaume couple by the HVA in the 1950s. On 1 February 1956, birthday greetings were sent to "Georg", via agent radio on 6 October 1956 birthday greetings were sent to "Chr.", and in mid-April 1957 was sent the message "Congratulations on your second son!" (referring to his newborn son Pierre). The Federal Intelligence Service (BND) was able to decipher these radio messages and archived them. Based on these records, Guillaume's identity was later established beyond doubt, as was his former work for the HVA. In February 1973, senior civil servant Heinrich Schoregge from the Cologne Office for the Protection of the Constitution (BfV) was dealing with three espionage cases in which Guillaume was involved.

== Brandt resignation ==
Brandt was succeeded as Chancellor by fellow SPD member Helmut Schmidt who, unlike Brandt, belonged to the right wing of his party. For the rest of his life, Brandt remained suspicious that his fellow SPD members and longtime rival Herbert Wehner had been scheming for his downfall, but evidence for this seems scant.

Aside from internecine intrigue within the SPD, the finger of blame for Brandt's fall was also pointed at the East German leadership. Some speculated that the East German regime under Erich Honecker had intentionally used Guillaume to engineer Brandt's downfall. Brandt's policy of Ostpolitik had made him a hero and symbol of hope for national and family reunification in the East. Therefore, from Honecker's view, Brandt's popularity in East Germany represented a threat to the regime. In his memoirs, Brandt noted Honecker's denial of complicity in his downfall, adding "whatever one may think of that." Stasi-head Markus Wolf stated after German reunification that the resignation of Brandt had never been intended, and that the affair had been one of the biggest mistakes of the East German secret service. The affair is widely considered to have been a trigger for Brandt's resignation, not a fundamental cause. Instead, Brandt, dogged by scandal relating to serial adultery, and struggling with alcohol and depression, as well as the economic fallout of the 1973 oil crisis, seemed prepared to step down. As Brandt himself later said, "I was exhausted, for reasons which had nothing to do with the process going on at the time."

== Aftermath and depictions in popular culture ==
Guillaume was eventually released and sent to East Germany in 1981 in exchange for Western intelligence agents caught by the Eastern Bloc. Back in East Germany, Guillaume was celebrated as a hero, and given a job in the training of spies. He published his autobiography, Die Aussage (The Statement) in 1988. The story of Brandt and Guillaume is told in the play Democracy, by Michael Frayn. The play follows Brandt's career, from his election to Guillaume's imprisonment. It examines Guillaume's dual identity as trusted personal assistant to the West German chancellor and Stasi spy and examines his conflict as his duty to West Germany's enemies clashes with his genuine love and admiration for the chancellor.

In 2003, Brandt's son, Matthias Brandt, took the part of Guillaume in the film Im Schatten der Macht ("In the Shadow of Power") by German filmmaker Oliver Storz. The film deals with the Guillaume affair and Brandt's resignation. Matthias Brandt caused a minor controversy in Germany when it was publicized that he would take the part of the man who betrayed his father and made him resign in 1974. Earlier in 1974 – when the Brandts and the Guillaumes took a vacation to Norway together – it was Matthias, then twelve years old, who was the first to discover that Guillaume and his wife 'were typing mysterious things on typewriters the whole night through'.
