= Democracy (play) =

Play by Michael Frayn

Souvenir programme from the Royal National Theatre's production in London

Democracy is a play by Michael Frayn which premiered in London at the Royal National Theatre on September 9, 2003. Directed by Michael Blakemore, and starring Roger Allam as Willy Brandt and Conleth Hill as Günter Guillaume, it won the Evening Standard and Critics' Circle awards for Best Play.

Democracy premiered on Broadway at the Brooks Atkinson Theatre on November 18, 2004, and ran for 173 performances. It was nominated for the Tony Award and Drama Desk Award as Best Play.

It has also been staged in Copenhagen, Oslo, Stockholm, Helsinki (2005), Wellington, Vancouver, Toronto and Moscow (2016).

A revival of the play, directed by Paul Miller at Sheffield's Crucible Theatre, transferred to London's Old Vic Theatre in 2012.

The play, based on actual events, deals with the decision West German chancellor Willy Brandt had to make about exposing the Communist spy Günter Guillaume who worked as his secretary and had heard some of the state's most important secrets.

== Original London cast ==
- Willy Brandt – Roger Allam
- Hans-Dietrich Genscher – Nicholas Blane
- Ulrich Bauhaus – Paul Broughton
- Horst Ehmke – Jonathan Coy
- Günther Nollau – Christopher Ettridge
- Helmut Schmidt – Glyn Grain
- Reinhard Wilke – Paul Gregory
- Günter Guillaume – Conleth Hill
- Arno Kretschmann – Steven Pacey
- Herbert Wehner – David Ryall

== Original Broadway cast (principals) ==
- Willy Brandt – James Naughton
- Günter Guillaume – Richard Thomas
- Arno Kretschmann – Michael Cumpsty
- Herbert Wehner – Robert Prosky
- Reinhard Wilke – Terry Beaver
- Helmut Schmidt – John Dossett

== Awards and nominations ==
=== Original Broadway production ===
Year	Award	Category	Nominee	Result
2005	Drama Desk Award	Outstanding Play		Nominated
2005	Tony Award	Best Play		Nominated
