= Omid Nouripour =

German-Iranian politician

Omid Nouripour MdB
- امید نوری‌پور
- Nouripour in 2023

Vice President of the Bundestag (on proposal of the Alliance 90/The Greens group)
- Incumbent
- Assumed office 25 March 2025
- President: Julia Klöckner
- Preceded by: Katrin Göring-Eckardt

Leader of Alliance 90/The Greens
- In office 29 January 2022 – 17 November 2024 Serving with Ricarda Lang
- Deputy: Pegah Edalatian; Heiko Knopf; Marc Urbatsch
- Preceded by: Robert Habeck
- Succeeded by: Felix Banaszak

Member of the Bundestag; from Hesse
- Incumbent
- Assumed office 1 September 2006
- Preceded by: Joschka Fischer
- Constituency: State list (2006–2021); Frankfurt am Main II (2021–2025); State list (2025–present)

Personal details
- Born: 18 June 1975 (age 51) Tehran, Imperial State of Iran
- Citizenship: Germany; Iran
- Party: Alliance 90/The Greens
- Children: 1
- Education: University of Mainz (no degree)

Omid Nouripour (German pronunciation: [ˈoːmɪt ˈnuːʁipuːɐ̯]; Persian: امید نوری‌پور [oˈmiːd nuːɾiːˈpuːɾ]; born 18 June 1975) is a German-Iranian politician who has been serving as Vice President of the Bundestag since 2025. A member of Alliance '90/The Greens, he has been serving as a member of the Bundestag since 2006, representing the state of Hesse. From 2022 to 2024, he also served as co-leader of Alliance 90/The Greens, alongside Ricarda Lang.

Earlier in his career, Nouripour was his parliamentary group's spokesman on foreign affairs, and is a member of the Committee on Foreign Affairs and the Finance Committee. He is of Iranian background and moved to Germany as a child.

== Early life and education ==
Nouripour was born in Tehran. In 1988, aged 13, Nouripour immigrated to Frankfurt, West Germany, with his family. He studied German, political science, law, sociology, philosophy and economics at the University of Mainz, but did not earn a degree.

In 2002, Nouripour became a German citizen. Because Iran does not allow its citizens to relinquish their citizenship, that country considers him an Iranian citizen as well.

== Political career ==
Nouripour was elected to the German Federal Parliament in 2006 as the second member of Iranian descent (after Michaela Noll-Tadjadod), taking the vacated seat of the former Foreign Minister Joschka Fischer. He has since been representing the Frankfurt am Main II district and was re-elected in 2009, 2013, 2017 and 2021.

Nouripour was a member of the Committee on Foreign Affairs from 2014 to 2022 and of the Finance Committee from 2021 to 2022. He also served on the Committee on Human Rights and Humanitarian Aid from 2014 until 2017. He has written widely on migration.

In July 2015, Nouripour joined Germany’s Foreign Minister Frank-Walter Steinmeier on a trip to Cuba. It was the first time a German foreign minister had visited Cuba since the German reunification in 1990.

In addition to his committee assignments, Nouripour was the chairman of the German-Ukrainian Parliamentary Friendship Group from 2018 to 2021.

In the negotiations to form a so-called traffic light coalition of the Social Democrats (SPD), the Green Party and the FDP following the 2021 federal elections, Nouripour led his party's delegation in the working group on foreign policy, defence, development cooperation and human rights; his co-chairs from the other parties were Heiko Maas and Alexander Graf Lambsdorff.

On 29 January 2022, Nouripour was elected unopposed at co-chair of the Greens, along with Ricarda Lang. They succeeded Annalena Baerbock and Robert Habeck, who stepped down after joining the Scholz cabinet. Following a series of election defeats on the state level, Lang and Nouripour announced their resignation in September 2024.

Following the 2025 national elections, Nouripour won an internal vote against Katrin Göring-Eckardt and Claudia Roth to become the Green Party's candidate to become one of the vice-presidents of the German Parliament. In March 2025 he was elected Deputy President of the Bundestag.

== Political positions ==
=== Military procurement ===
In 2011, Nouripour accused the aerospace company EADS of strong-arming European governments into agreeing to fund the Airbus A400M Atlas by falsely suggesting the Franco-German-led company might otherwise collapse.

=== Relations with the Middle East and the Arab world ===
Speaking on the 2012 Bahraini uprising, Nouripour commented that "[a]s the kingdom of Saudi Arabia is supporting the state-repression inside Bahrain, Iran acts as the protector of the Shia."

In a study sent to the German foreign minister Guido Westerwelle in May 2012, Nouripour and Hans-Josef Fell proposed that Germany should help Iran expand renewable energy sources to solve the conflict over the nation’s nuclear program and prevent a war in the region. Under the umbrella of the German parliaments’ sponsorship program for human rights activists, Nouripour has been raising awareness for the work of the persecuted Iranian lawyer Nasrin Sotoudeh since 2012.

When Turkey formally asked NATO in November 2012 to set up missiles on its border with Syria due to growing concern about spillover from the civil war, Nouripour warned against Germany and NATO "letting themselves be drawn into the Syria conflict with no basis in international law." However, he later voted for posting two German Patriot missile batteries to help bolster security along Turkey's border with Syria in the context of the NATO-backed operation Active Fence in 2015.

For years Nouripour opposed listing the Lebanese militant group Hezbollah as a terrorist organization. Only after the 2012 Burgas bus bombing, he stated that “it’s now time to isolate Hezbollah.”

In 2013 Nouripour co-sponsored an initiative at the German Bundestag aimed at singling out products from Israeli settlements in the West Bank with a labeling system.

In May 2014 and February 2016, Nouripour visited the Zaatari refugee camp in Jordan to learn more about the plight of Syrians fleeing the violence in the Syrian civil war that had been going on since 2011.

Until 2020, Nouripour sat on the advisory board of the German Palestinian Society (Deutsch-Palästinensische Gesellschaft), which supports the Boycott, Divestment and Sanctions movement (BDS), which was designated as anti-semitic by the German Bundestag in May 2019. In the 2019 parliamentary debate on BDS, Nouripour criticised BDS actions like the call for a boycott of the 2019 Eurovision Song Contest in Tel Aviv.

=== Relations with the African continent ===
On Somalia, Nouripour has a mixed voting record. He has supported Operation Atalanta (2009, 2010, 2011 and 2018) but for a period of time regularly abstained from votes on extending the mandate for the mission (2012, 2013, 2014 and 2015). He also voted against German participation in EUTM Somalia (2014 and 2016), and abstained in 2015. After reports in 2010 that the German company Asgaard had signed a deal with a Somali warlord to provide security services, Nouripour accused the German government of not doing enough in the past to regulate private security firms.

== Other activities ==
- Atlantik-Brücke, Member of the Board
- Berghof Foundation, Member of the Advisory Council
- European Council on Foreign Relations (ECFR), Member
- German Africa Foundation, Member of the Board
- German Association for Small and Medium-Sized Businesses (BVMW), Member of the Political Advisory Board (since 2022)
- German Institute for International and Security Affairs (SWP), Member of the Council
- German-Mozambican Society, Member of the Advisory Board
- Inter-Parliamentary Alliance on China (IPAC), Member
- World Vision Deutschland, Member of the Board of Trustees
- Center for International Peace Operations (ZIF), Member of the Supervisory Board (2009-2013)
- Das Progressive Zentrum, Member of the Circle of Friends (–2021)
