= Erika Steinbach =

German politician (born 1943)

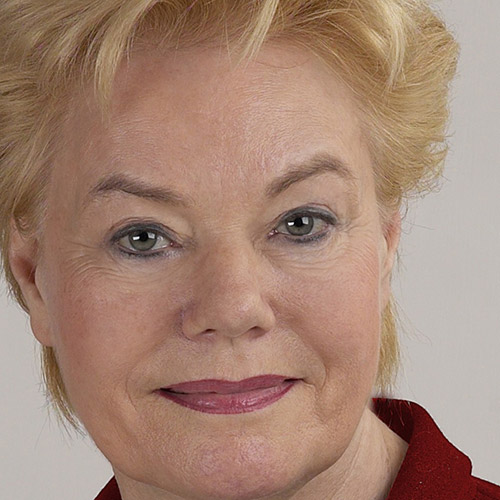
- Steinbach in 2014

Member of the Bundestag; from Hesse
- In office 20 December 1990 – 24 October 2017
- Preceded by: Helmut Link
- Succeeded by: Bettina Wiesmann
- Constituency: Frankfurt am Main III (1990–1998); State list (1998–2005); Frankfurt am Main II (2005–2017)

Personal details
- Born: Erika Hermann; 25 July 1943 (age 83) Rahmel, Germany
- Party: Alternative for Germany (since 2022)
- Other political affiliations: CDU (1974–2017)
- Spouse: Helmut Steinbach (m. 1972; died 2019)
- Committees: Committee on Human Rights and Humanitarian Aid (2005–2017)
- Website: www.erika-steinbach.de

Erika Steinbach (born 25 July 1943) is a German right-wing politician. She previously served as a member of the Bundestag from 1990 until 2017.

She was a member of the Christian Democratic Union from 1974 to 2017, and served as a member of the CDU national board from 2000 to 2010, as a member of the leadership of the CDU/CSU parliamentary group and as the CDU/CSU's spokeswoman on human rights and humanitarian aid 2005–2017. Steinbach belonged to the socially conservative wing of the CDU and opposes abortion and same-sex marriage. During the European migrant crisis, Steinbach was critical of Chancellor Merkel's policies: in January 2017 she left the CDU over the migrant issue, from then on sitting as an independent member of the Bundestag. She did not stand in the September 2017 federal election, therefore leaving the Bundestag. Instead, Steinbach has publicly endorsed the Alternative für Deutschland (AfD), though she did not become a member of the right-wing populist party. In 2018 Steinbach became President of the Desiderius-Erasmus-Stiftung, a political foundation affiliated with the AfD. A long-time member of the German-Israeli Association, Steinbach is also known for pro-Israeli views, and has often criticized the German Foreign Office for voting in favour of anti-Israeli resolutions at the UN.

In addition to her parliamentary activity, Steinbach was president of the Federation of Expellees from 1998 to 2014. Erika Steinbach studied music and was a member of concert orchestras before becoming a politician.

== Early life ==
Steinbach's father, Wilhelm Karl Hermann, was born in Hanau (Hesse, western-central Germany), but his family had their origins in Lower Silesia. In 1941 he was stationed in Rumia (German: Rahmel), a village in the Second Polish Republic, which was occupied by Nazi Germany in 1939 as part of the newly created province of Reichsgau Danzig-West Prussia. Wilhelm Karl Hermann served there as an airfield technician as a Luftwaffe Sergeant. Steinbach's mother, Erika Hermann (née Grote), was ordered to work in the town after the annexation as a Luftwaffenhelfer. Steinbach was born there as Erika Hermann.

In January 1944, her father was deployed to the Eastern Front. In January 1945 during East Prussian Offensive of the Soviet Army, Steinbach's mother together with her children, fled to Schleswig-Holstein in northwestern Germany. In 1948 the family moved to Berlin, where Steinbach's grandfather had become mayor of one of the districts.

In 1949, Wilhelm Karl Hermann returned from Soviet captivity. In 1950, the family moved to Hanau, Hesse where Steinbach finished her education and started studying the violin. In 1967 she had to abandon her music career due to a damaged finger. In 1972, she married Helmut Steinbach, the conductor of a local youth symphonic orchestra. Steinbach graduated from a school of civil administration and moved to Frankfurt, where she started working for a Communal Evaluation Office.

== Political career ==
=== Career in the CDU, Member of Parliament ===
In 1974 she joined the Frankfurt branch of the CDU. In 1977 she was elected a member of the Frankfurt City Council and held that post until 1990.

She was elected a member of the Bundestag in 1990, for the constituency of Frankfurt am Main III representing that until 1998. Since 2005, she has represented the constituency of Frankfurt am Main II. In 1990 she voted against the German–Polish Border Treaty (1990). In 1997 she criticized the approval of the Czech-German Declaration of Reconciliation.

Since 2005, she has been a member of the German parliamentary Committee on Human Rights and Humanitarian Aid and spokesperson for human rights and humanitarian aid of the CDU/Christian Social Union fraction. She is also a deputy member of the parliamentary Committee for the Interior. Since 2000, she has been a member of the national board of the CDU (German, CDU-Bundesvorstand).

In 2009, she was offered the position of Secretary of State in the Federal Ministry of Education and Research, but declined.

=== Federation of Expellees ===
Steinbach joined the German Federation of Expellees in 1994. In May 1998 she was elected President of the organization, and was re-elected in 2000, 2002, 2004, 2006, 2008 and 2010. The Federation of Expellees claims to have 1.3 million members. This figure was disputed in January 2010 by the German news service DDP, which reported an actual membership of 550,000.

The German Federal Expellee Law of 1953 defines as expellee all German nationals and ethnic Germans with a primary residence outside post-war Germany, who lost this residence in the course of the World War II-related flight and expulsions.

Steinbach has distanced herself from the Prussian Trust, that aggressively seeks restitution of German properties in Poland.

Steinbach represents the Federation of Expellees on the board of the national broadcasting company ZDF.

=== Centre Against Expulsions ===
Erika Steinbach is the founder, along with Peter Glotz, of the foundation Centre Against Expulsions (German: Zentrum gegen Vertreibungen), which is working to establish a museum for the victims of "Flight, displacements, forced resettlements and deportations all over the world in the past century", a project of the German federal government on initiative and with participation of the Federation of Expellees. The museum will contain a permanent exhibition to document expulsions including the expulsion of Germans after World War II.

The federal government established the federal foundation "Flucht, Vertreibung, Versöhnung" which is intended to be the basis of a future museum. The Federation of Expellees is entitled to appoint some of the board member, although they need to be confirmed by the cabinet.

On 4 March 2009 the Federation of Expellees decided not to nominate Steinbach to the council and instead left one seat unoccupied, after the Social Democratic Party of Germany (SPD) threatened to veto Steinbach's appointment to the board. On 19 October 2009, after the SPD was ousted from government and replaced by a liberal-conservative coalition dominated by Steinbach's party, Steinbach announced her intention to take the seat at the board. However, objections against her were subsequently also raised by the new foreign minister Guido Westerwelle of the liberal Free Democratic Party. However, Steinbach is supported by her own party and the CSU, both of which have called upon Westerwelle to give up his resistance, and have cited earlier statements by Westerwelle where he had praised Steinbach a few years ago.

In 2006 she was involved in an exhibition on the expulsions in Europe in the 20th century. The exhibition deals with expulsions of German, Armenians, Poles, Turks, Greeks, Latvians, Karelians, Ukrainians, Italians and other peoples – topics many Europeans are unfamiliar with.

=== International human rights activism ===
As the CDU/CSU spokeswoman for human rights, Erika Steinbach is involved in a number of activities promoting human rights worldwide.

She was an expert speaker at the International Cuba Conference of the International Society for Human Rights in 2006.

=== Franz Werfel Human Rights Award ===
Together with Peter Glotz, she was the primary initiator of the Franz Werfel Human Rights Award, and serves as a jury member together with Otto von Habsburg, Klaus Hänsch and Otto Graf Lambsdorff among others. It has been awarded every second year since 2003 in the Frankfurt Paulskirche. The 2009 recipient was Herta Müller.

=== Membership of the CDU national board ===
Steinbach was a member of the CDU national board from 2000 to September 2010, when she chose to resign from the position following a controversy over comments about the German invasion of Poland. Steinbach, in support of other members of her expellee organization, said that the German attack on Poland was just a response to Poland's mobilization, resulting in criticism of her. Steinbach's resignation was met with mixed feelings within the CDU/CSU. Some members were worried that her departure could cause a split, and a formation of a new right wing party in Germany.

=== End of CDU membership ===
Steinbach left the CDU in January 2017, stating that Chancellor Angela Merkel's decisions during the European migrant crisis, which she called a violation of the German law, prompted her decision. She did not run in the 2017 federal election.

=== Affiliation with the AfD ===
After leaving the CDU, Steinbach became informally associated with the AfD. In 2018 Steinbach became President of the Desiderius-Erasmus-Stiftung, a political foundation affiliated with the AfD. As President of the foundation, Steinbach has also advocated pro-Israeli views.

=== Interest in language ===
Steinbach was member of the Goethe-Institut from 1994 to 2002. She is also member of the Verein Deutsche Sprache.

== Political positions ==
Erika Steinbach was considered conservative within the CDU in most fields of policy, belonging to the initiators of the Berliner Kreis in der Union. Her work as a member of parliament focuses on human rights, and she is a strong critic of human rights violations in communist countries around the world. She is also a strong supporter of the process of European integration.

Steinbach endorses the Charter of the German expellees of August 1950.

=== Social policy ===
Erika Steinbach holds conservative views on social policy and opposes abortion and same-sex marriage, which sometimes has caused controversy.

=== Immigration ===
Since the onset of the European migrant crisis, Steinbach has been one of the most vocal critics of Chancellor Merkel's refugee policies. This resulted in her leaving the CDU in January 2017; she said that allowing so many people into Germany for months without identifying them properly went "against our laws and against EU treaties" and that she could no longer support the CDU.

== Perception ==
Erika Steinbach is much more widely known in Poland and the Czech Republic than in Germany. According to Cordell and Wolff (2005), the political importance the Federation of Expellees has in German politics is overestimated in Poland and the Czech Republic because of its disproportional media presence in those countries and campaigns of "aggressively nationalist politicians".

=== Criticism ===
Steinbach's public pronouncements have been criticized by late President of Poland Lech Kaczyński for causing a deterioration in German-Polish relations. Steinbach has a negative reputation in Poland. One example of this was a 2003 cover montage of Polish news magazine Wprost that depicted her riding Chancellor Gerhard Schröder while wearing an SS uniform. In 2007 Gazeta Wyborcza, a popular newspaper in Poland, reproduced a leaflet presenting Steinbach in the succession of the Teutonic Knights and the Nazis, and repeated claims of the full compensations never paid to Poland for losses caused by Nazi Germany.

Polish ambassador to Germany, Marek Prawda, Poland's Foreign Minister Radosław Sikorski and Polish Prime Minister Donald Tusk expressed unease with Steinbach's appointment to the board of the Center against Expulsions in February 2009. Władysław Bartoszewski, an Auschwitz survivor who is Poland's commissioner on relations with Germany, said that giving Mrs Steinbach a seat on the board would be akin to the Vatican appointing a Holocaust denier like Richard Williamson to manage relations with Israel. On 16 September 2010, Steinbach attested Bartoszewski "a bad character" on German TV. At the time the Polish foreign minister, Radosław Sikorski, privately warned Berlin that allowing Mrs Steinbach's appointment would shake German-Polish relations "to their foundations". "Do people whose families lived there for generations want to be identified with a person like Mrs. Steinbach, who came to our country with Hitler and had to leave it with Hitler too?" Sikorski said in Brussels on 23 February 2009, referring to Steinbach's father having moved to German-occupied Poland during the war and asked her to follow the example of President Horst Köhler, who was born within a family of wartime German settlers in Poland and never considered himself an expellee. The fact that Steinbach represents a person born to a German officer stationed in occupied Poland has been described as one of the essential issues for Poles.

Václav Havel, the former president of the Czech Republic and anti-communist dissident, was said to refuse to speak to Steinbach due to the positions taken by the Federation of Expellees under her leadership.

According to an editorial in the Kölner Stadt-Anzeiger, the Polish criticism may be part of an "anti-German campaign" in which Steinbach has become the "enemy stereotype" and "demonization of Steinbach is a kind of reason of state". The way she is portrayed to the Polish public has been described by some German editorial writers as having "hysteric features" or a "psychosis". Some German media blame members of Law and Justice for having used her as a "hate figure" in internal politics to counter Donald Tusk ignoring Steinbach's "real views".

=== Lecture controversy ===
In May 2008 Steinbach started a series of lectures about the "German settlement in Eastern Central Europe" at the University of Potsdam. However demonstrations by left-wing students who protested against Steinbach's allegedly revisionist views on German history by throwing water filled balloons and blocking the entrances compelled her to cancel the further lectures. On 11 June 2008, a full meeting of the students council decided (with 146 against 7 votes) to protect the right of freedom of opinion and speech and invited Steinbach again, if necessary under police protection. The local Mayor, supported by several political parties, expressed his displeasure about the incident and requested that the university council invite Steinbach again.

== Honours ==
On 9 July 2009, she was awarded the Bavarian Order of Merit by Prime Minister of Bavaria Horst Seehofer for her work for the rights of the victims of the Expulsion.
