= Günter Guillaume =

Stasi officer (1927–1995)

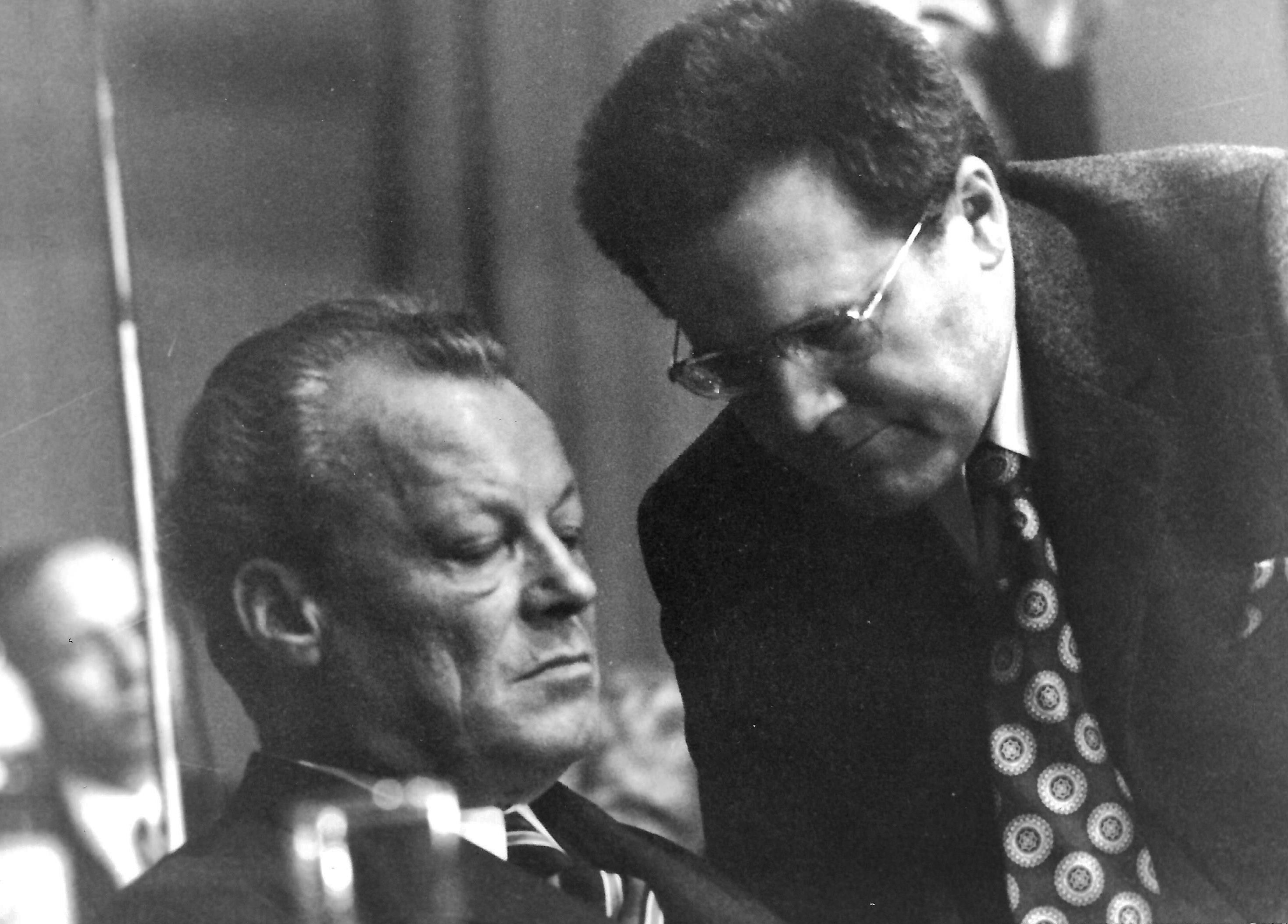
- Guillaume (right) with West German chancellor Willy Brandt, 1972–1974
- Born: Günter Karl Heinz Guillaume; 1 February 1927; Berlin, Prussia, Weimar Republic
- Died: 10 April 1995 (aged 68); Petershagen-Eggersdorf, Brandenburg, Germany
- Resting place: Parkfriedhof Marzahn; 52.5485°N 13.5415°E, Berlin
- Occupations: Intelligence agent; secretary of West German chancellor Willy Brandt
- Years active: 1956–1974
- Known for: Infiltration of West German government
- Political party: NSDAP (1944–45); SED (from 1952); SPD (from 1957)
- Criminal charge: Treason
- Criminal penalty: 13 years in prison
- Criminal status: Pardoned 1 October 1981
- Spouses: Christel Guillaume (m. 1951; div. 1981) Elke Bröhl (m. 1990)
- Children: Pierre Boom
- Military career
- Allegiance: Greater German Reich; German Democratic Republic
- Branch: Luftwaffe
- Service years: 1944–1945; 1956–1990
- Rank: Oberst
- Conflicts: World War II
- Awards: Order of Karl Marx

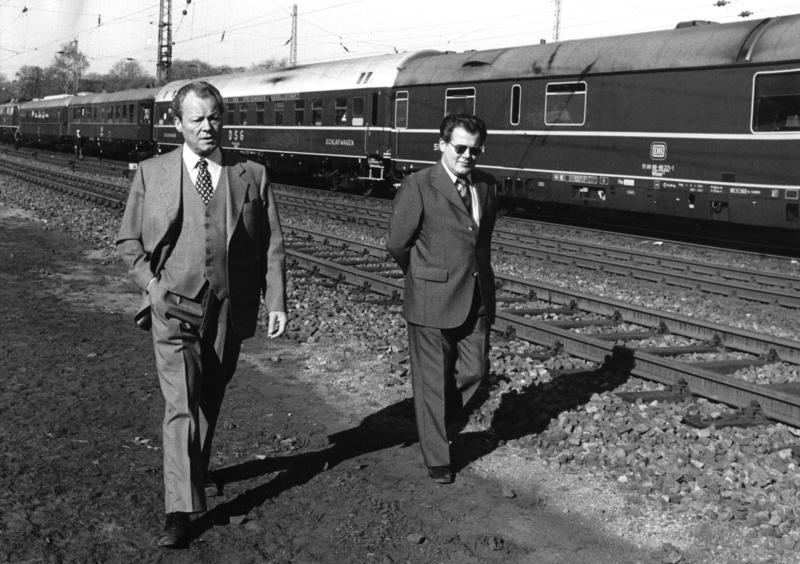
Willy Brandt with Guillaume, 1974

Günter Guillaume (1 February 1927 – 10 April 1995) was an East German spy who gathered intelligence as an agent for East Germany's secret service, the Stasi, in West Germany. Guillaume became West German chancellor Willy Brandt's secretary, and his discovery as a spy in 1973 led to Brandt's downfall in the Guillaume affair.

== Early life ==
Günter Karl Heinz Guillaume was born on 1 February 1927 at 31 Choriner Straße in Prenzlauer Berg, then a working-class district of Berlin. He was the only child of Karl Ernst Guillaume, a pianist who played in bars and theatres, where he provided background music for silent films, and Johanna Old Pauline (née Loebe), a hairdresser. His parents, who had married four months before Günter's birth, were both native to Berlin. Due to the combination of the Great Depression and the introduction of sound films, the Guillaumes suffered financial hardship. These experiences made the extremist policies being presented by Adolf Hitler and Nazi Party attractive to Karl Guillaume, and he joined in March 1934. Guillaume was conscripted as a Flakhelfer in 1944. On 17 January 1944, Guillaume applied for admission to the NSDAP and was admitted on 20 April of the same year (membership number 9,709,880).

== Career ==
In 1956, he and his wife Christel, also a Stasi agent, emigrated to West Germany on Stasi orders to penetrate and spy on West Germany's political system. Rising through the hierarchy of the Social Democratic Party of Germany, he became a close aide to West German chancellor Willy Brandt. In 1974, West German authorities discovered that Guillaume was spying for the East German government. The resulting scandal, the Guillaume Affair, led to Brandt's resigning the chancellorship. On 15 December 1975, Guillaume was sentenced to 13 years in prison for treason; his wife Christel, to eight years.

In 1981, Guillaume was returned to East Germany in exchange for Western spies caught by the Eastern Bloc. Christel, who had returned earlier that year, divorced him. He was awarded the Order of Karl Marx. In East Germany, Guillaume was received and celebrated as a hero, worked as a spy trainer, and in 1988 published his autobiography Die Aussage ("The Statement").

In 1990, Guillaume married his second wife, nurse Elke Bröhl. Guillaume and East German spymaster Markus Wolf said that Willy Brandt's downfall was not intended, and that the affair was among the Stasi's biggest mistakes. After Die Wende and German reunification, the reunified Germany granted Guillaume immunity from any further prosecutions. Guillaume was called as a witness for the prosecution in Markus Wolf's trial for treason in 1993. In his testimony, he claimed he "could barely remember details of events stretching back over forty years" and in response to most questions put by the prosecution and the presiding judge, Guillaume only referred them to his autobiography.

== Death ==
Guillaume died of a heart attack and a stroke on 10 April 1995 in Petershagen/Eggersdorf, near Berlin. Guillaume's first wife died on 20 March 2004.

== In culture ==
The Brandt-Guillaume story is told in the play Democracy by Michael Frayn. It follows Brandt's political career as West Germany's first left-leaning chancellor in 40 years, and his fall because of his assistant. It portrays Guillaume as in conflict by spying on Brandt while growing to admire him.

== Notes and references ==
=== References ===
- Michels, Eckar (2013). Guillaume, der Spion: eine deutsch-deutsche Karriere [Guillaume, the spy: a German-German career] (in German). Berlin: Ch. Links Verlag. ISBN 978-3-86153-708-3.
