= Ulli Nissen =

German politician (born 1959)

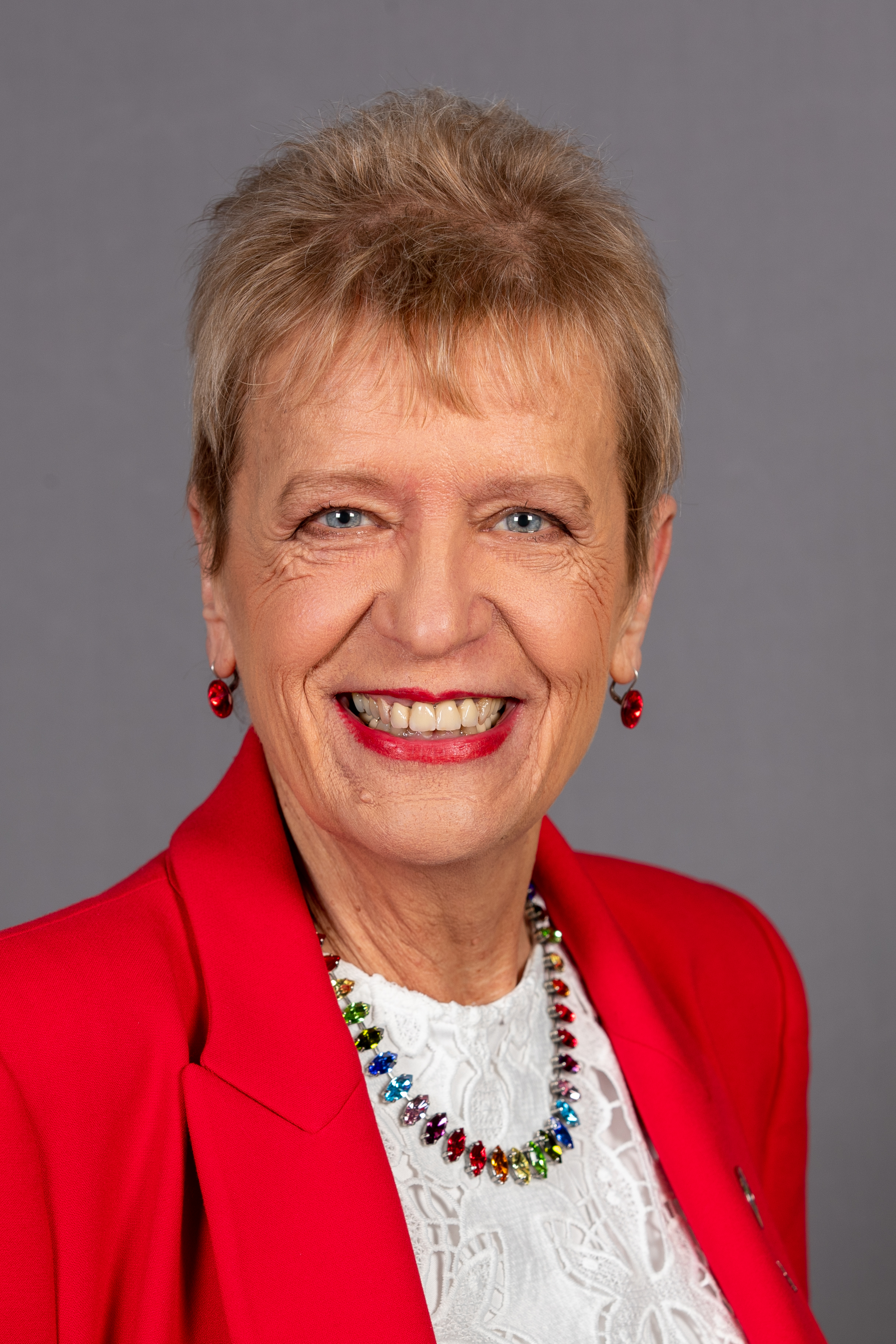
- Ulli Nissen in 2020

Member of the Bundestag
- Incumbent
- Assumed office 2013

Personal details
- Born: 16 June 1959 (age 66) Essen, West Germany (now Germany)
- Party: SPD

Ulli Nissen (born 16 June 1959) is a German politician of the Social Democratic Party (SPD) who has been serving as a member of the Bundestag from the state of Hesse since 2013.

== Political career ==
Born in Essen, North Rhine-Westphalia, Nissen became member of the Bundestag in the 2013 German federal election, representing Frankfurt. She is a member of the Committee on Construction, Housing, Urban Development and Communities and the Committee on Environment, Nature Conservation and Nuclear Safety.

== Other activities ==
- 1. FFC Frankfurt, Member
- German United Services Trade Union (ver.di), Member
- Pro Asyl, Member
