= Centre Against Expulsions =

Planned Nazi German documentation centre

The Centre Against Expulsions (German: Zentrum gegen Vertreibungen, ZgV) was a planned German documentation centre for expulsions and ethnic cleansing, particularly the expulsion of Germans after World War II. There were three different phases of expulsion: the fleeing of an oncoming Red Army, 'wild expulsions' before the end of the war, and those sanctioned as a result of the Potsdam Treaty.'

Since March 19, 2008 the name of the project is Sichtbares Zeichen gegen Flucht und Vertreibung.

The project was initiated by the Federation of Expellees, who dedicated a "Foundation Centre Against Expulsions" to the centre. This foundation is based in Wiesbaden, and headed by CDU politician and president of the Federation of Expellees, Erika Steinbach. The other head of the foundation was SPD politician Peter Glotz who died in 2005. The head of the foundation ZgV since 2018 is Christean Wagner, a politician of the Christian Democratic Union in Germany.

Since late 2008, the project is forwarded by the Federal Republic of Germany, when the federal government and parliament passed a law calling for the constitution of a Foundation German Historical Museum subordinate to the federal government, which in turn shall hold a Foundation Flight, Expulsion, Reconciliation which shall take on the actual documentation in Berlin. The project has been subject to criticism, especially in Poland.

== "Foundation Centre Against Expulsions" of the Federation of Expellees ==
The Federation of Expellees (German: Bund der Vertriebenen, BdV) is the German non-governmental head organization of various organized groups of German refugees and expellees. The federation is committed to document the post- World War II flight and expulsion of Germans as well as other forced displacements, and maintains an exhibition for this purpose shown in changing locations of Germany. To expand this exhibition and to find a permanent place for it, the Federation of Expellees set up the "Foundation Centre Against Expulsions" (German: Stiftung Zentrum gegen Vertreibungen, ZgV)) on 6 September 2000.

=== Objectives ===
The foundation Centre Against Expulsions defines four objectives:

1. To document the history of settlement, culture, post-World War II deportation and expulsion, forced labour, torture, and later emigration of Germans from various countries of Central, Eastern and Southeastern Europe, in a modern museum. The museum shall provide room for the documentation and "additional space for sadness, sympathy and forgiveness" in a requiem rotunda.
2. To document and to evaluate the impact of the integration of millions of uprooted Germans into the post-World War II German society.
3. To document the "expulsion and genocide of other peoples, especially in Europe", arguing that "displacement, expulsion and genocide can never be justified, [...] are always a crime, contradicting human rights and carried out by following the archaic thinking of the bloody vendetta."
4. To donate a Franz Werfel Human Rights Award to people who "sharpen the sense of responsibility through their actions is one of the foundation's tasks".

== "Foundation Flight, Expulsion, Reconciliation" ==
On 11 November 2005, the largest German political parties SPD and CDU signed a coalition. One stated goal of the coalition is the establishment of a centre termed "Visible Sign" (German: Sichtbares Zeichen).

On 3 September 2008 the German federal government passed a law calling for the establishment of a center against expulsions in the Deutschlandhaus building of the Anhalter Bahnhof site in Berlin-Kreuzberg. The law passed the German parliament and was enacted on 29 December 2008. The center is to be run by a "Foundation Flight, Expulsion, Reconciliation" (German: Stiftung Flucht, Vertreibung, Versöhnung) subordinate to the governmental "Foundation German Historical Museum" (German: Stiftung Deutsches Historisches Museum).

=== "Foundation German Historical Museum" of the German federal government ===
The purpose of this foundation is stated in §16 of the above-mentioned law as follows:

(1) The purpose of the non-autonomous foundation is to ensure in the spirit of reconciliation the remembrance of flight and expulsion in the 20th century in the historical context of the Second World War and the Nazi expansion and extermination policy and their aftermaths.

(2) This purpose shall be fulfilled especially by the following measures:

- (2.1) Establishment, maintenance and expansion of a permanent exhibition documenting flight and expulsion in the 20th century, the historical background and contexts as well as the European dimension and effects.
- (2.2) Development of singular exhibitions for special aspects of the overall context.
- (2.3) Distribution of research results and scientific findings.
- (2.4) Gathering, documentation and scientific evaluation of respective sources and materials, also and especially eyewitness accounts.
- (2.5) Cooperation with German and international museums and research centers.

== People and supporters ==
The scientific advisory board includes or included Jörg Baberowski, Arnulf Baring, Peter Becher, Lothar Gall, Bernhard Graf, Helga Hirsch, Walter Homolka, Eckart Klein, Hilmar Kopper, Rudolf Kucera, Otto Graf Lambsdorff, Horst Möller, Christoph Pan, Rüdiger Safranski, Christoph Stölzl, Christian Tomuschat, Krisztián Ungváry, Georg Wildmann, Michael Wolffsohn, Alfred-Maurice de Zayas and Zoran Ziletic.

The United Nations' first High Commissioner for Human Rights Dr. José Ayala Lasso, German chancellor Angela Merkel, Nobel literature laureate and Holocaust survivor Imre Kertész, Joachim Gauck, Milan Horáček, former Austrian crown prince Otto von Habsburg, and historians such as Guido Knopp, Hungarian novelist György Konrád, and Christian Tomuschat, have also voiced their support for the centre.

== Criticism ==
In a petition initiated by Hans Henning Hahn, Eva Hahn, Alexandra Kurth, Samuel Salzborn and Tobias Weger in 2003, signed by several hundred people, primarily German, Czech, and Polish historians, opponents of the proposed form of Centre expressed concerns the centre would "establish and popularize a one-sided image of the past, without historical context", and see the dangers of "de-contexualizing the past" and "ethnification of social conflicts". German-Jewish writer Ralph Giordano withdrew his initial support for the same reason, but defended Steinbach against the latest personal accusations from Poland, which he called defamation. Former German Foreign minister Joschka Fischer said "This can't be a museum of German war victims. Germans can't point fingers at others".

=== Criticism in Poland ===
Critics in Poland oppose the idea of the centre claiming that it would equate German suffering with that of the Jews and Poles and will suggest a moral equivalence between the victims of war and their oppressors. Marek Edelman, the last living leader of Warsaw Ghetto Uprising, criticized the project as nationalistic, arrogant and serving to realize political ambitions of the backers of the project. According to Edelman other nations subject to German expulsions didn't establish any comparable monuments, even as they faced a harsher fate than Germans.

The Polish government opposes the involvement of Erika Steinbach in any issues related to Polish-German history and at the same time supports an international net of centers dedicated to remembrance of totalitarian regimes and their victims called "European Network Remembrance and Solidarity".

== See also ==
- Expulsion of Germans after World War II
- Flight and expulsion of Germans from Poland during and after World War II
