= Maas-Schwalm-Nette Nature Park =

Nature park in North Rhine-Westphalia, Germany

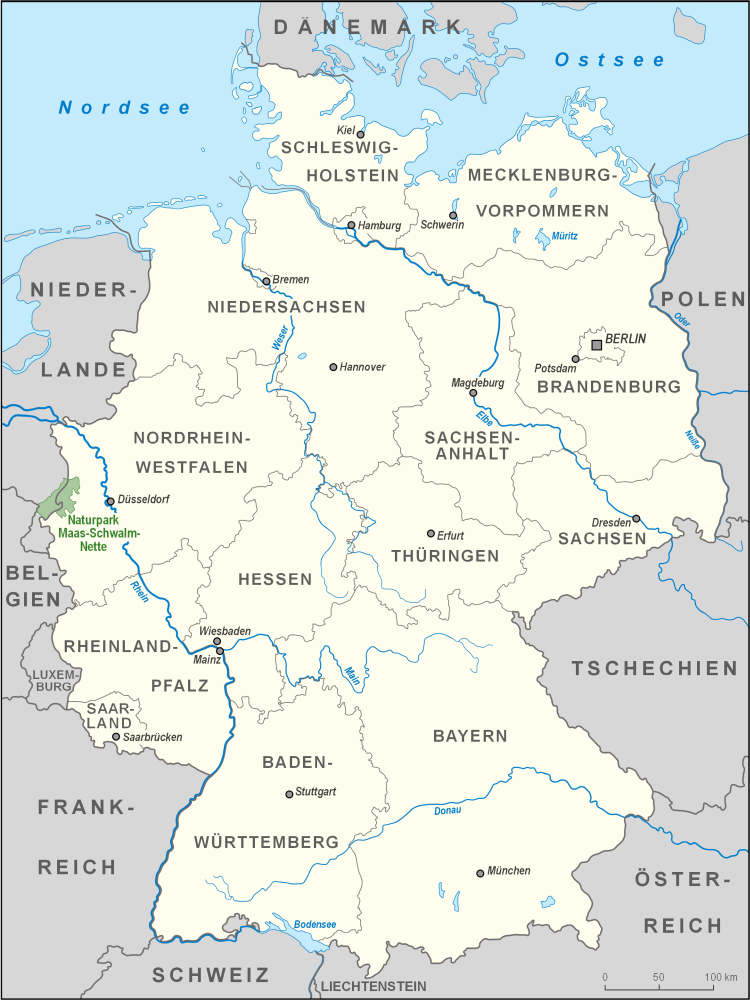
Location of the Maas-Schwalm-Nette Nature Park

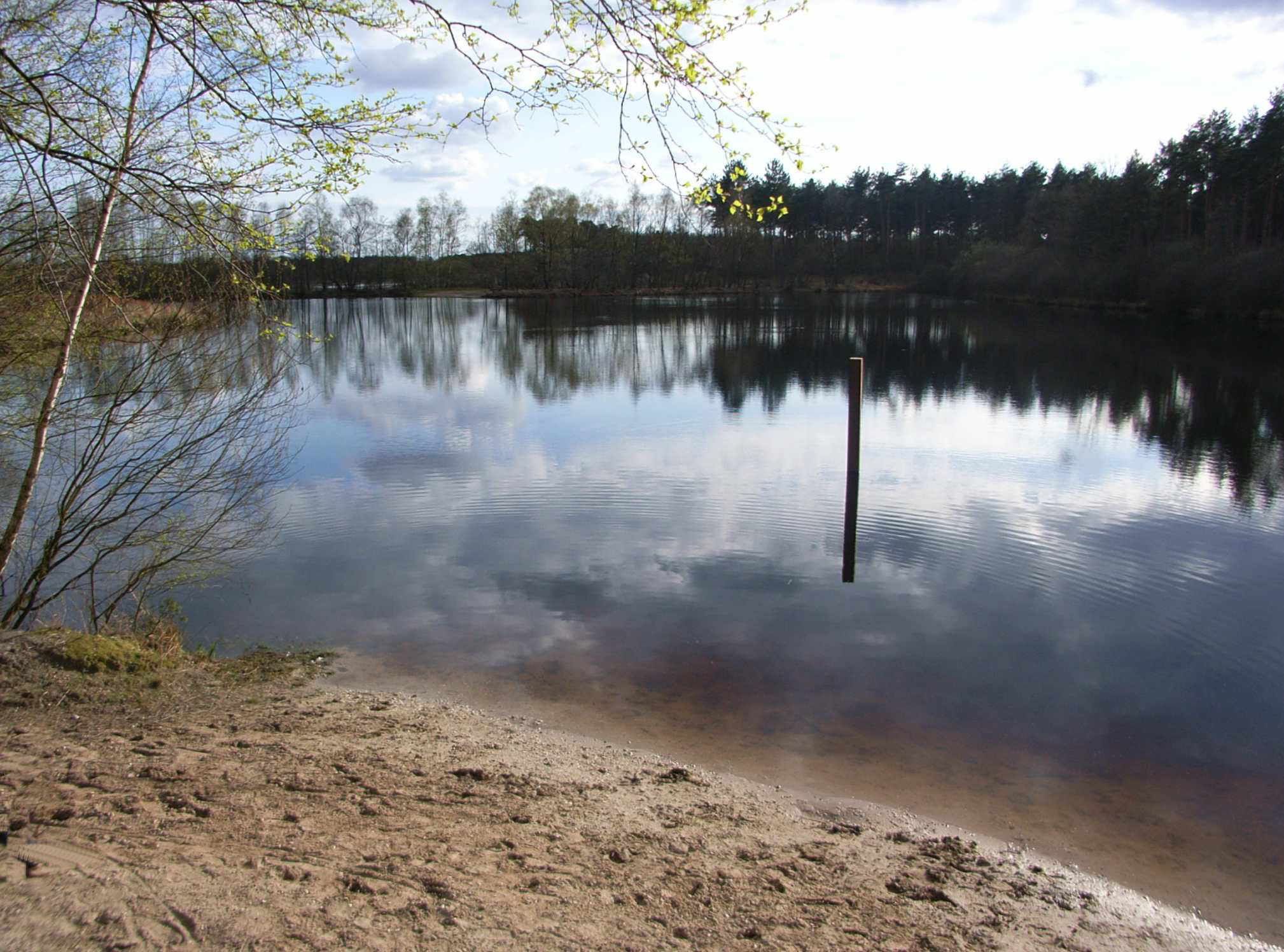
Lake on the Dutch-German border

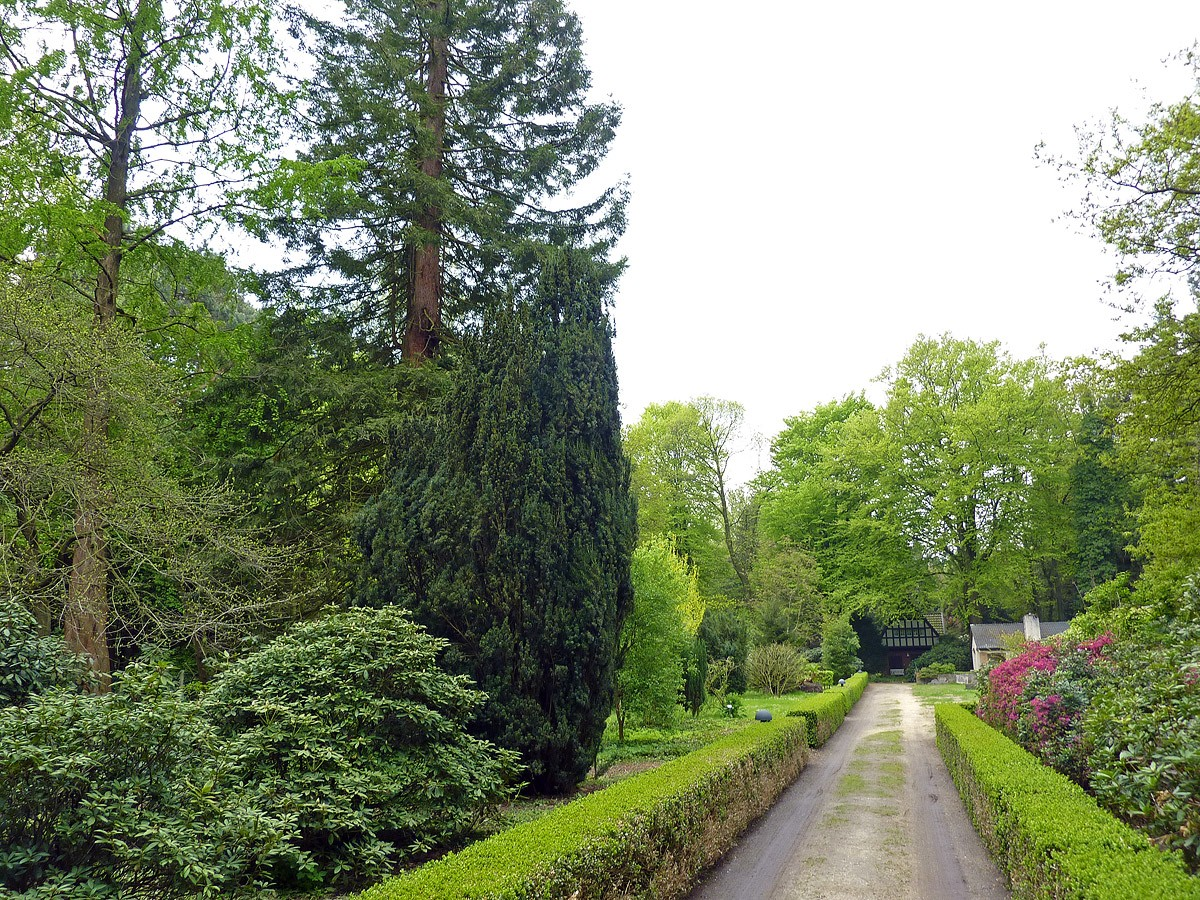
Entrance to the Kaldenkirchen Sequoia Farm

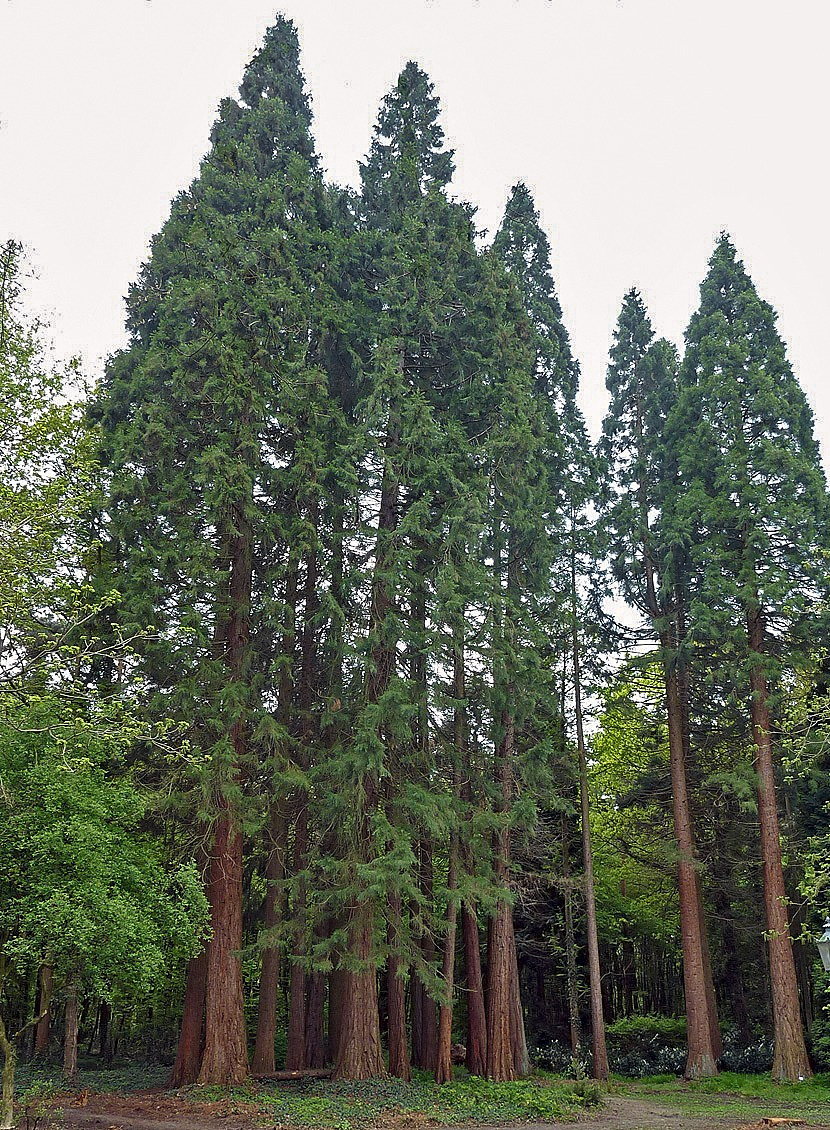
Giant sequoias in the Sequoia Farm

The Maas-Schwalm-Nette Nature Park (German: Naturpark Maas-Schwalm-Nette; Dutch: Grenspark Maas-Swalm-Nette) or NMSM is a cross-border nature park in Germany and the Netherlands, which was founded in 2002. It is a regionally important recreation area.

== Description ==
The park has an area of 870 km^{2}. Its name comes from the major rivers that flow through it, the Maas (English: Meuse), Schwalm and Nette.

The park is often confused with the Naturpark Maas-Schwalm-Nette (Schwalm-Nette Nature Park) which was founded in 1965 and has been integrated into the NMSN since 2002.

It covers an area that includes the counties of Kleve, Viersen and Heinsberg as well as the town of Mönchengladbach in Germany and in the municipalities of Roermond, Roerdalen, Venlo, Echt-Susteren, Leudal and Maasgouw in the Netherlands.

Within the Maas-Schwalm-Nette Nature Park is the nature reserve of Krickenbecker Seen with its four lakes that were formed by peat cutting. On the territory of Niederkrüchten lies the only juniper heath of the Lower Rhine Region, surrounded by the Elmpter Schwalmbruch. The Kaldenkirchen Border Forest (Nettetal) with its arboretum, the Sequoia Farm and the geo-hydrological water garden are also parts of the park.

21 visitor centres provide information about the landscape, art, nature, culture and history of the park. Numerous excursions and activities are also offered.

Its water balance was and is affected by the brown coal open-cast pits south of Mönchengladbach. After the Garzweiler I pit had been exhausted, work began on Garzweiler II. It slowly approached Mönchengladbach until it reached the Bundesautobahn 46.

In 2022, RWE AG, the Federal Ministry for Economic Affairs and Energy (minister was Robert Habeck), and the Ministry of Economic Affairs, Industry, Climate Protection and Energy of the State of North Rhine-Westphalia agreed to end lignite mining in the Rhenish mining area by 2030, rather than between 2035 and 2038 as originally planned.

== Information centres ==
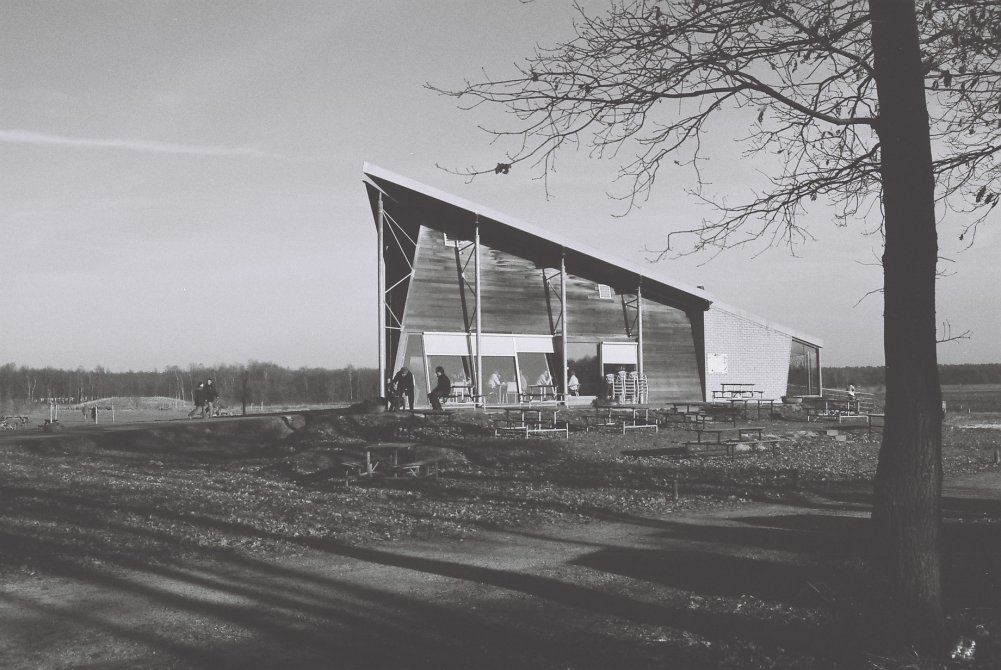
Visitor Centre, De Meinweg National Park

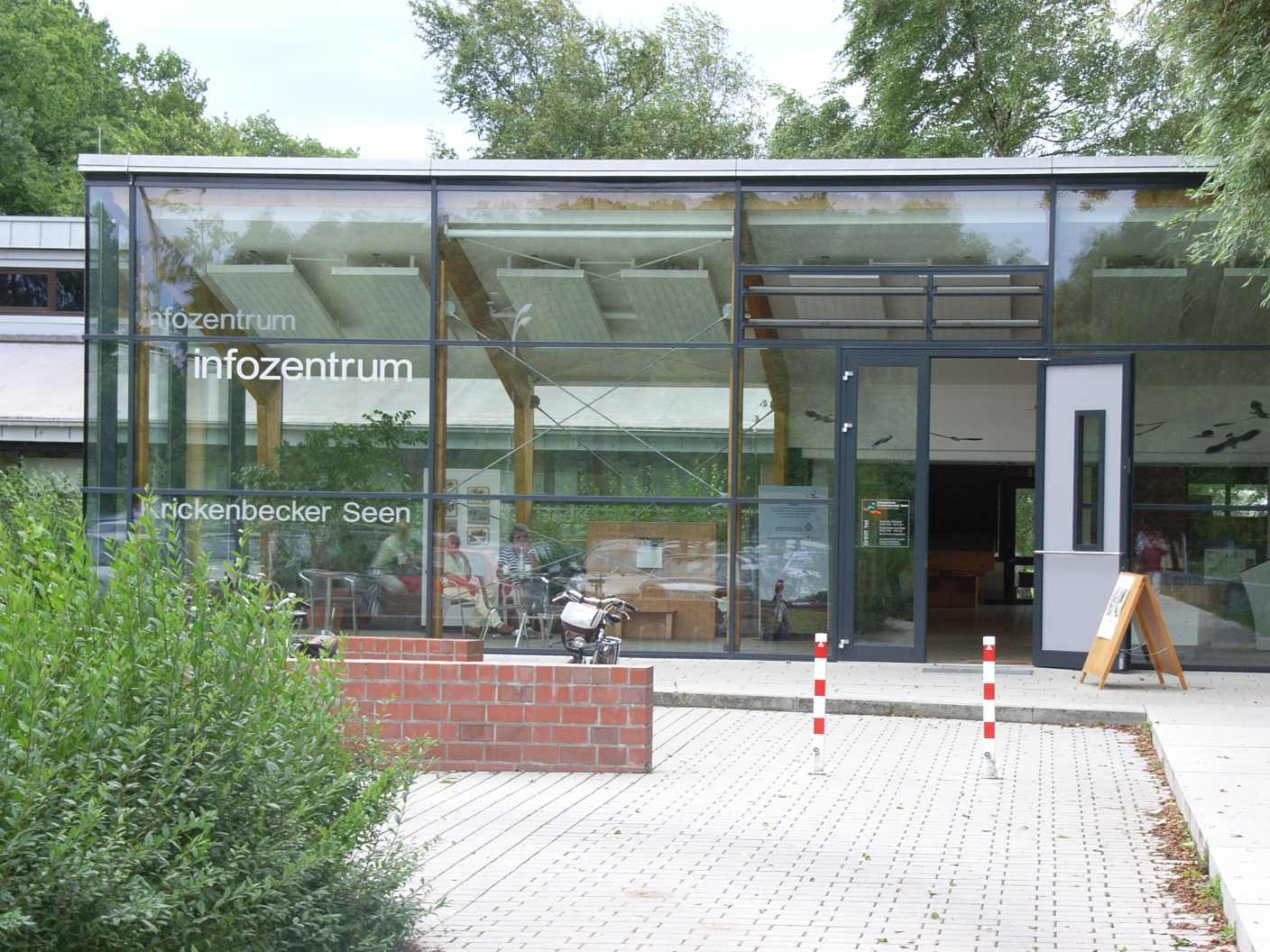
Information centre in Nettetal-Hinsbeck (Hombergen)

- in Germany
  - Haus Püllen nature park centre in Wachtendonk
  - Krickenbecker Seen information centre near Nettetal-Hinsbeck
  - Nature park information point at Brüggen Castle
  - Wildenrath Nature Park Centre near Wegberg
- in the Netherlands
  - Groote Heide information centre near Venlo
  - Visitor centre of the De Meinweg National Park near Herkenbosch

== Nature reserve facilities ==
- NABU nature reserve centre (Naturschutzhof) in Nettetal-Sassenfeld
- NABU nature reserve station at Haus Wildenrath

== Museums and other facilities ==
- in Germany
  - Lower Rhine Open-Air Museum in Grefrath
  - Die Scheune Textile Museum in Nettetal-Hombergen
  - Landschaftshof Baerlo in Nettetal-Leutherheide with "green classroom"
  - Geo-hydrological water garden in Nettetal-Kaldenkirchen
  - Kaldenkirchen Sequoia Farm – arboretum
  - Hunting and natural history museum, Brüggen Castle, Brüggen
  - Schrofmühle mill in Wegberg-Rickelrath
  - Beecker Flax Museum in Beeck (Wegberg)
- in the Netherlands
  - Kinderboerderij Hagehof near Venlo, a farm for children
  - Botanische Tuin, Jochum-Hof in Steyl has hiesige plants and a Mediterranean garten
  - Visitor centre Towana en keramiekcentrum Tiendschuur in Tegelen offers insights into the hiesige manufacture of pottery
  - De Kookboerderij en De Historische Groentehof in Beesel; a cooking studio in an old farmyard
  - St. Elisabethshof NME Centre en Strekkmuseum Leudal in Haelen with local history museum
  - The Roerstreek Museum in Roermond with inter alia archaeological finds
  - Das Bijen visitor centre in Mariahoop provides information on the world of bees

== Film ==
- Bilderbuch Germany: Der Nature parks Maas-Schwalm-Nette. Documentary, 45 min., a film by Tilman Jens, produced by: WDR, first broadcast: 8 July 2007, Contents

== See also ==
- List of nature parks in Germany
- List of lakes of Germany
