= Kranenbach =

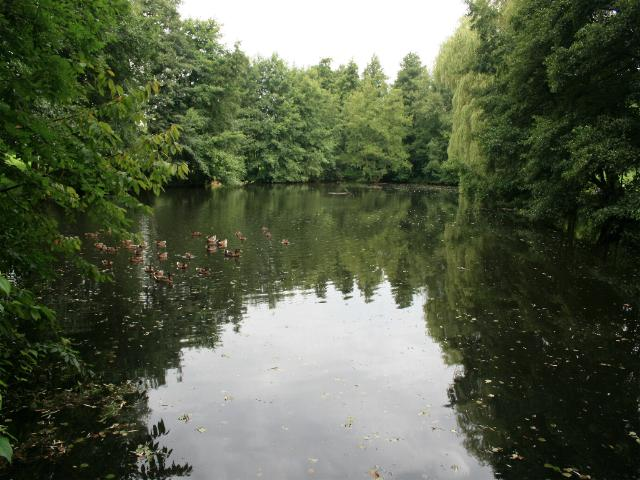
- Millpond of the Hausermühle mill

Location
- Country: Germany
- State: North Rhine-Westphalia
- District: Viersen
- Reference no.: DE: 2848

Physical characteristics
- Source
  - location: By the Vennbachhof near Ungerath (Schwalmtal)
  - coordinates: 51°11′04″N 6°17′14″E
  - elevation: ca. 60 m above sea level (NN)
- Mouth
  - location: By the Borner Mühle into the Schwalm
  - coordinates: 51°14′29″N 6°12′12″E
  - elevation: ca. 40 m above sea level (NN)
- Length: 9.463 km (5.880 mi)
- Basin size: 48.917 km^{2} (18.887 sq mi)

Basin features
- Progression: Schwalm→ Meuse→ North Sea

The Kranenbach is an orographically right-hand tributary of the Schwalm in the Lower Rhine county of Viersen.

Its source is in the vicinity of Vennbachhof near Ungerath (in the municipality of Schwalmtal) at a height of around 60 m above NN. The stream has a length of just under 9.5 kilometres and empties into the Schwalm by the mill of Borner Mühle at a height of about 40 m above NN.. The Kranenbach picks up the waters of the Haversloher Bach (1.5 kilometres long), the Heidweiher Bach (1.5 kilometres long), the Vogelsrather Bach (1.7 kilometres long), the Schageher Bach (1.4 kilometres long) and the Berggraben which has a length of 2.3 kilometres.

The Kranenbach was canalized in the years 1925/26. Its care and maintenance is the responsibility of the Schwalmverband, which has its head office in Brüggen.

== Mills ==
There are a number of former water mills on the Kranenbach:

- Hausermühle, Schwalmtal, Waldniel
- Schierer Mühle, Schier
- Pletschmühle, Amern
- Hüttermühle, Amern
