= Waldniel =

- Ortsteil of Schwalmtal
- Coat of arms

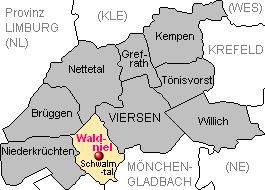
- Location of Waldniel within Viersen district
- Interactive map of Waldniel
- Location within Germany Location within North Rhine-Westphalia
- Coordinates: 51°12′47″N 6°16′23″E
- Country: Germany
- State: North Rhine-Westphalia
- Admin. region: Düsseldorf
- District: Viersen
- Municipality: Schwalmtal

Population (2020-12-31)
  - Total: 11,750
- Time zone: UTC+01:00 (CET)
  - Summer (DST): UTC+02:00 (CEST)
- Postal codes: 41366

Waldniel (Limburgish: Wádneel) is a village, part of the municipality Schwalmtal in the district Viersen, North Rhine-Westphalia, Germany. It has 11,750 inhabitants (December 2020).

== History ==
The first humans lived at the location of the modern Waldniel in the Neolithic (2000 v. Chr.) In 1020, this place was first mentioned in a document.

== Geography ==
The Kranenbach flows through Waldniel.

== Notable residents ==
- Albin Windhausen (1863–1946), painter
- Josef Windhausen (1888–1946), local politician (CDU)
- Heinz Küppenbender (1901–1989), manager
- Ludwig Gabriel Schrieber (1907–1975), sculptor, painter and draughtsman
- Ernst van Aaken (1910–1984), sports physician and trainer
- Rudi Fuesers (1928–2010), trombonist of modern jazz
- Herbert Dörenberg (born 1945), football coach and former professional footballer
- Stefan Berger (born 1969), Member of Parliament, Landtag of North Rhine-Westphalia
- Bernhard Rösler (1906–1973), entrepreneur, honorary citizen of the municipality of Schwalmtal (1972)
- Joachim "Joko" Winterscheidt (born 1979), actor and presenter (grew up in Waldniel)
- Karl Oelers (1913–1971), manufacturer
