= Landesburg =

Type of castle

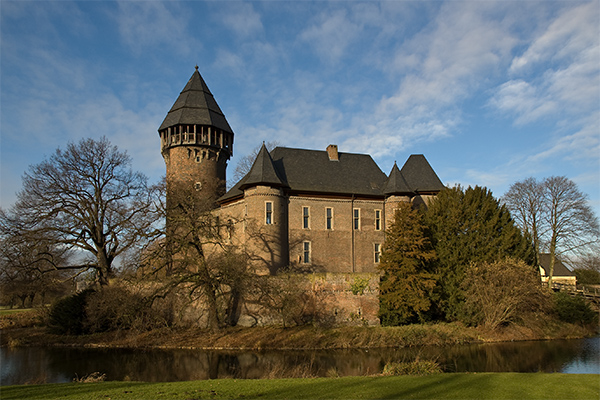
Electoral Cologne's Landesburg at Linn was built to defend against Cleves, Moers and Berg

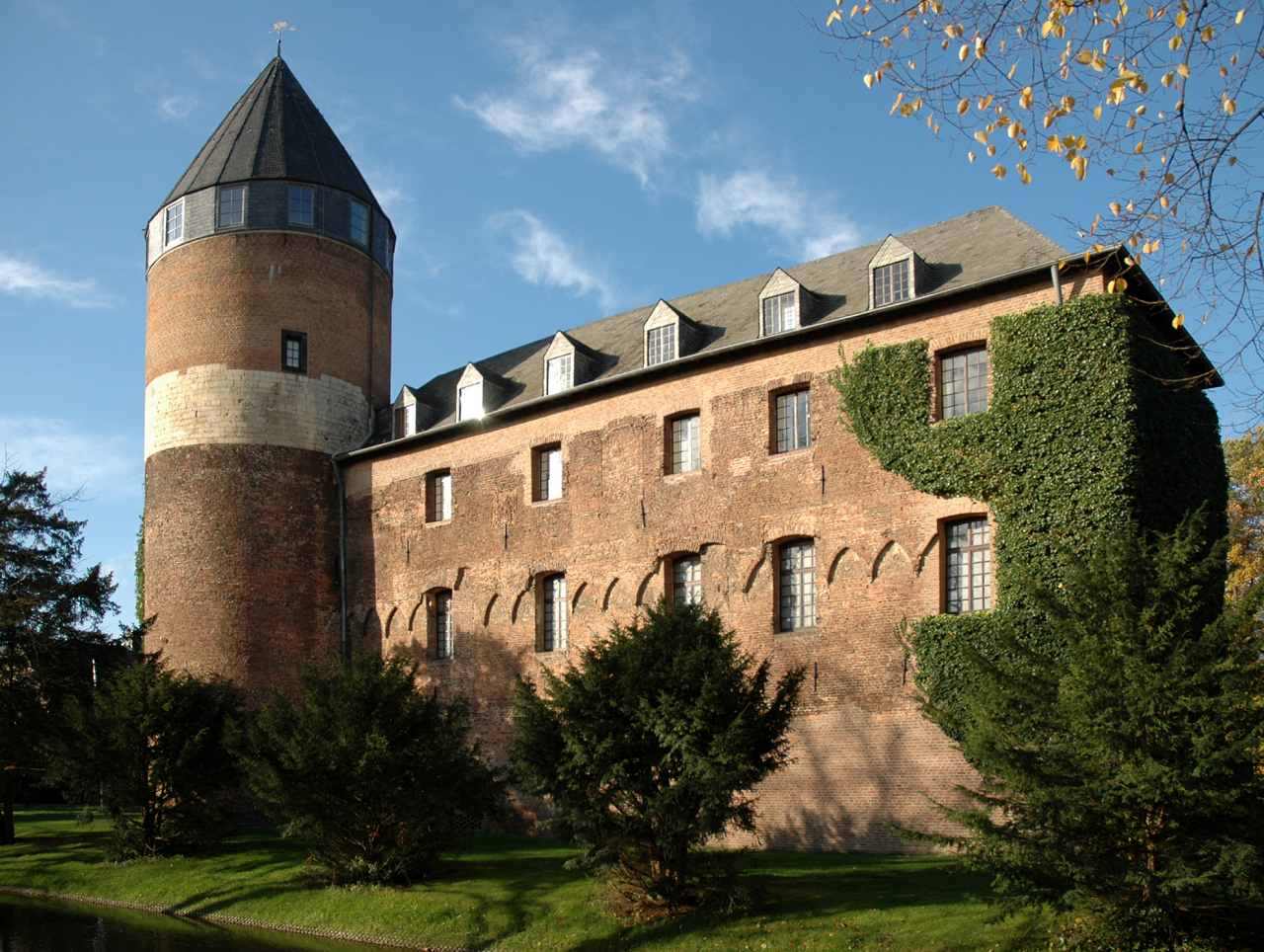
The Landesburg of Brüggen secured the Duchy of Jülich in the north

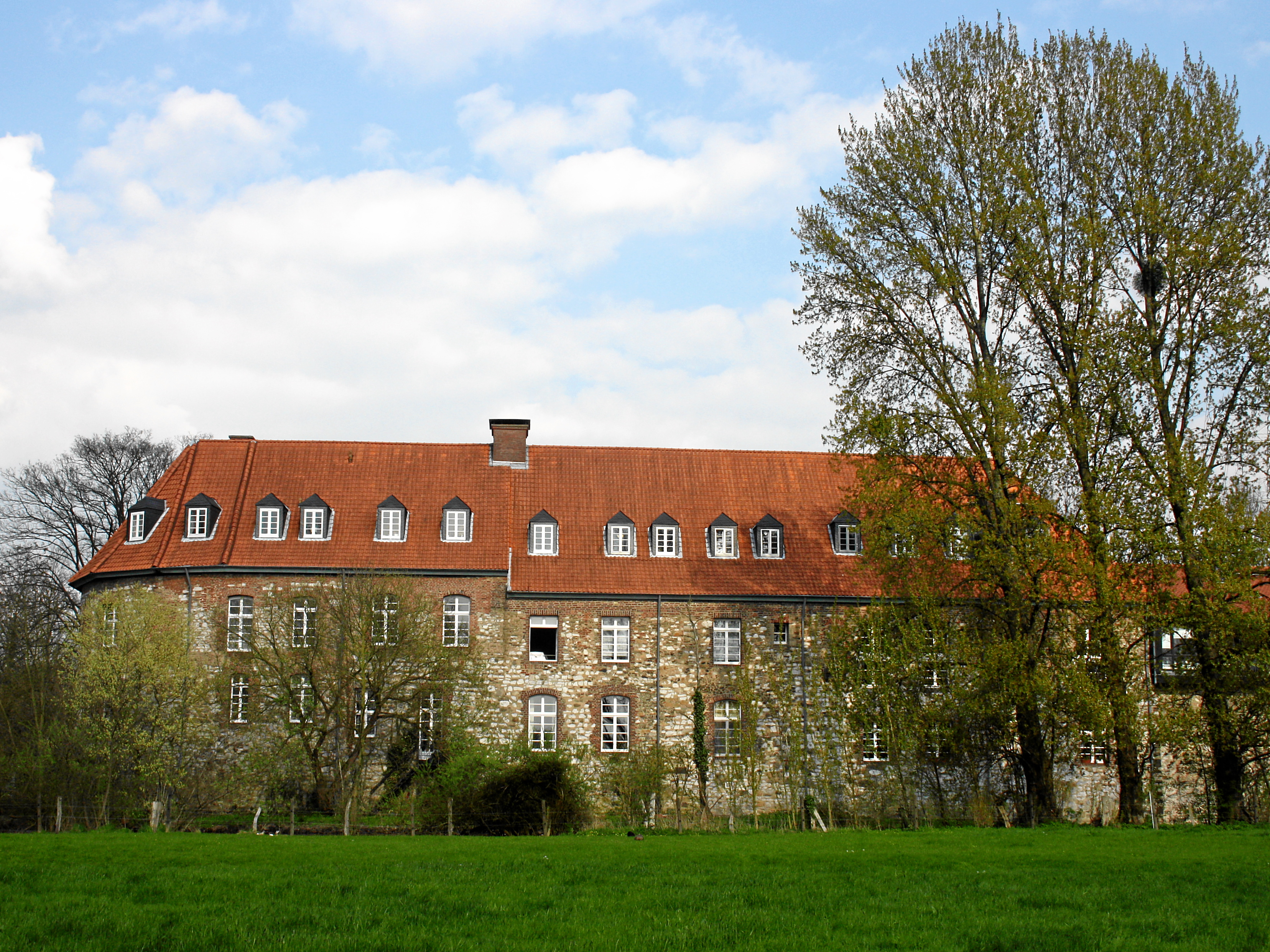
The northernmost bastion of the counts of Berg: the Landesburg of Angermund

A Landesburg or landesherrliche Burg ("sovereign castle", "state castle" or "stately castle") was a castle that a territorial lord, such as a prince-bishop, duke or prince built for the defence or expansion of his sovereign estates. They were thus the central and most important castles of the great princely territories. The Landesburgen were usually the property of the territorial lord, but they sometimes referred to castles that he did not own, but were available to him as a safe house (Offenhaus). The large castles of the 8th to 10th centuries, east of the Rhine and outside the towns were often described as Landesburgen because they performed important functions in the control of the state.

== History ==
The emergence of Landesburgen began in the Late Middle Ages and was a result of the decline of royal centralised power and the associated displacement of power "from former great territories to regional territories". In the early stages of this development regional lords used their allodial castles as a means of forming and preserving contiguous territories. In this connexion such fortifications took on the function of a territorial castle (Territorialburg). An example is Zülpich Castle, which was built by the archbishops of Cologne to secure their estates from attack by the counts of Jülich. Often Landesburgen were used as counter-castles (Gegenburgen) to the fortifications of neighbouring and rival territorial lords.

Landesburgen were thus a cornerstone of dynastic politics and central to the exercise of political-military power. To achieve the latter, Landesburgen were usually assigned to a permanent cadre of castellans (Burgmannen) and associated troops who thus acted as a garrison. In addition to their importance as an instrument of territorial policy the Landesburgen were given a central role in the administration of the land and the dispensation of justice, typically by being home to a chancery and a treasury. If the sovereign tasked a representative, such as a burgrave or Amtmann, to safeguard regional territorial sovereignty, he would use the castle as a residence and seat of local government. In such cases, it was referred to as an Amtsburg ("administrative castle"), which was the administrative centre of the administrative districts that emerged in the late medieval period. However, if the sovereign prince stayed at the castle - albeit only temporarily - it became known as a Residenzburg or "residence castle". In such a case, it would be enhanced by appropriate representational buildings such as a great hall or a palas to be able to accommodate the emperor and his retinue for a limited time. Illustrative examples of such residence castles are the Electorate of Cologne's Lechenich Castle, Jülich's Brüggen Castle and the castles of Angermund in the eponymous quarter of Düsseldorf and Windeck Castle, which belonged to the Count of Berg.

Several Landesburgen had still other functions: they served as a mints, toll castles, supply depots or harbour castles, and were therefore of great financial and economic importance, not just for the surrounding castle estates, settlements and towns, but also for the whole princely territory. After the expansion of territory in the large principalities, many Landesburgen served primarily to securing their borders. The archbishops of Cologne, for example, surrounding their whole territory with strong border fortresses. For example, Linn Castle was built in today's Krefeld to counter the predations of the dukes of Cleves, the counts of Moers and the counts of Berg. Kempen Castle protected the Electorate of Cologne's area to the northwest, while Lechenich and Zülpich were built to defend against the strongest rival of the Electorate of Cologne, the counts of Jülich. Andernach Castle, however, was built for the defence of the state against the Electorate of Trier.

Landesburgen emerged in the 14th century and were often built on the foundations of earlier fortifications that had been destroyed or fallen into ruin. These castles were typically much larger than their predecessors. They were constantly expanded and modernized in order to be prepared for the latest weapons technology and to meet the needs of the time. Landesburgen were often integrated into the fortifications of a town or city, using and reinforcing the existing defences. This is clearly visible in, for example, the castles of Andernach, Kempen and Rheinbach.

== Literature ==
- Horst Wolfgang Böhme, Reinhard Friedrich, Barbara Schock-Werner (eds.): Wörterbuch der Burgen, Schlösser und Festungen. Philipp Reclam, Stuttgart 2004, ISBN 3-15-010547-1, pp. 175, 241.
- Stefan Frankewitz: Geldrische Landesburgen vom 13. bis zum Ende des 15. Jahrhunderts. In: Johannes Stinner, Karl-Heinz Tekath (eds.): Gelre – Geldern – Gelderland. Geschichte und Kultur des Herzogtums Geldern . Verlag des Historischen Vereins für Geldern und Umgebung, Geldern, 2001, ISBN 3-921760-35-6, pp. 185–204.
- Richard Klapheck: Die Baukunst am Niederrhein. Vol. 1. Düsseldorf, 1915/1916, pp. 46–66 (online).
- Hanns Ott: Rheinische Wasserburgen. Geschichte – Formen – Funktionen. Weidlich, Wurzburg, 1984, ISBN 3-8035-1239-5, pp. 133–171.
