= Hariksee =

Lake in Schwalmtal, North Rhine-Westphalia, Germany

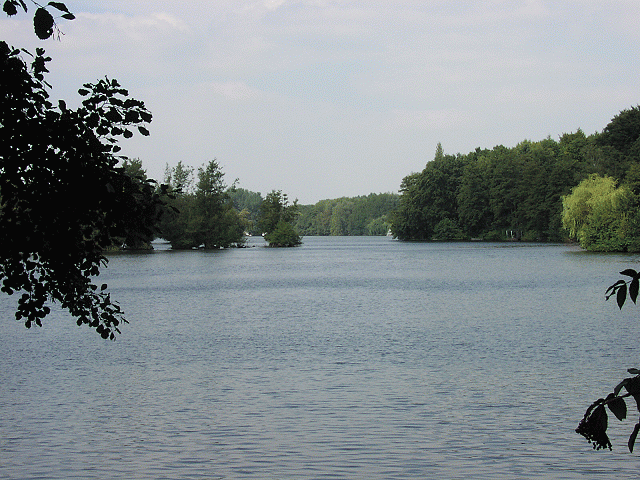
- View of the Hariksee (2003)

- Location within North Rhine-Westphalia
- Location: Niederrhein, North Rhine-Westphalia
- Coordinates: 51°13′20″N 6°13′25″E
- Primary inflows: Schwalm
- Primary outflows: Schwalm
- Basin countries: Germany
- Surface area: 0.2 km^{2} (0.077 sq mi)

The Hariksee is a lake in the Niederrhein ("Lower Rhine" region in North Rhine-Westphalia, Germany. It has a surface area of 0.2 km^{2}. The River Schwalm flows through the lake.
