= Grefrath =

- Municipality
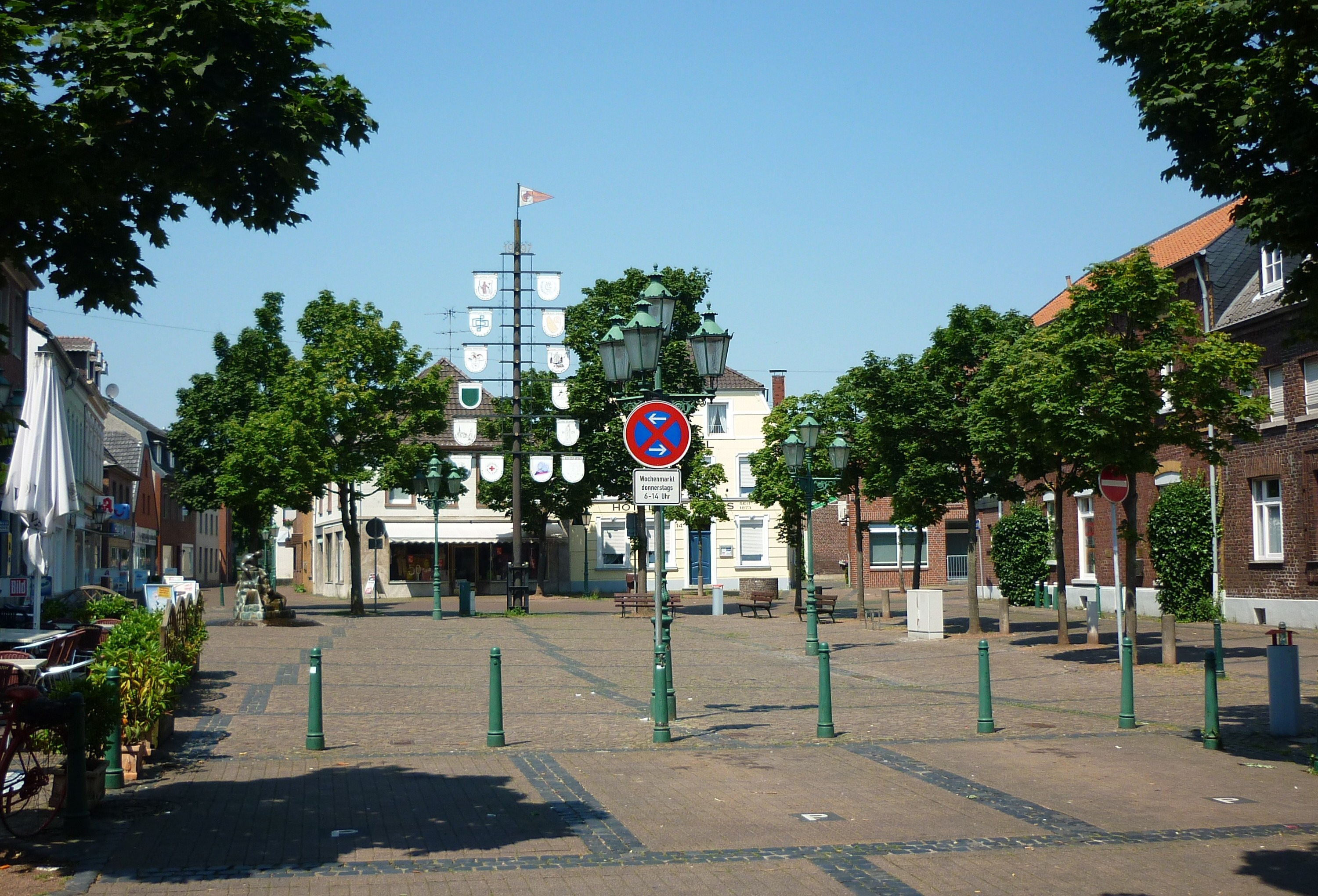

- Coat of arms

- Location of Grefrath within Viersen district
- Interactive map of Grefrath
- Location within Germany Location within North Rhine-Westphalia
- Coordinates: 51°20′N 6°20′E
- Country: Germany
- State: North Rhine-Westphalia
- Admin. region: Düsseldorf
- District: Viersen
- Subdivisions: 4

Government
  - Mayor (2020–25): Stefan Schumeckers (CDU)

Area
  - Total: 30.98 km^{2} (11.96 sq mi)
- Elevation: 32 m (105 ft)

Population (2025-12-31)
  - Total: 15,050
  - Density: 485.8/km^{2} (1,258/sq mi)
- Time zone: UTC+01:00 (CET)
  - Summer (DST): UTC+02:00 (CEST)
- Postal codes: 47929
- Dialling codes: 0 21 58
- Vehicle registration: VIE
- Website: www.grefrath.de

Grefrath (German pronunciation: [ˈɡʁeːfʁaːt]) is a municipality in the district of Viersen, in the western part of North Rhine-Westphalia, Germany.

It is situated in the Lower Rhineland region (German: Niederhein), which is located between the river Rhine and the borderline between Germany and the Netherlands.

== Geography ==
The river Niers crosses through the municipality from the south to the north.

The villages of Grefrath and Vinkrath are located on the westerly bank of the small river, whereas Oedt and Mülhausen are situated on the easterly bank.

Towns and municipalities adjoining Grefrath are (clockwise, beginning in the north):

- Wachtendonk
- Kempen
- Tönisvorst
- Viersen
- Nettetal

The nearest bigger cities are Mönchengladbach (15 km [9.3 mi] to the south-south-east), Krefeld (15 km [9.3 mi] to the east) and Venlo (15 km [9.3 mi] to the west).

== History ==
The town of Grefrath was first mentioned in 1177, at that time bearing the name of Greverode. This stands for "The Earls' Clearing" (German: Rodung der Grafen). .

In 1243 Grefrath was acquired by the county of Geldern (since 1339: duchy of Geldern) to which it belonged for the next centuries. In 1543 the duchy of Geldern was given to the Burgundian Netherlands, also called the Spanish Netherlands after the division of the House of Habsburg.

During the Eighty Years' War, in which the Seventeen Provinces (predecessor of today's Netherlands) fought for their independence from Spain, Grefrath continued to belong to Spain along with the southerly part of the duchy of Geldern. Following the conclusion of the Treaty of Utrecht in 1713, the Spanish part of the duchy of Geldern was added to Prussia.

In the course of the French Revolutionary Wars, Grefrath was occupied by the French in 1794. It became an official part of the French territory in 1801, belonging to the department Roer. After the defeat of Napoleonic France, the left Lower Rhineland region was returned to Prussia as a result of the Congress of Vienna in 1815, and Grefrath was assigned to what later became the Kempen District (Kreis Kempen).

Over a century later, when the country of Prussia was finally dissolved, Grefrath became a part of the newly created German federal state of North Rhine-Westphalia. In 1970, the municipalities of Grefrath (including the villages of Grefrath and Vinkrath) and Oedt (including the villages of Oedt and Mülhausen) were united.

The United States Army's 507th U.S. Army Artillery Detachment was activated in 1970 and was assigned to the 5th U.S. Army Artillery Group. This detachment consisted of four teams, Alpha Team was headquartered in Grefrath, Germany. These teams were responsible for the security and maintenance of the Nike Hercules missile and was the only nuclear-armed surface-to-air weapon operational with the US Army.

507th Arty Det	TEAM	LOCATION	UNIT SUPPORTED	COMMENTS
	HQ	Grefrath	9th Missile Wing	The 9 Missile Wing was a Dutch-speaking Wing with Flemish personnel
	A Team	Grefrath	56th Squadron	
	B Team	Kaster	53rd Squadron	
	C Team	Kapellen	55th Squadron	
	D Team	Xanten	54th Squadron	
	E Team	Fort Bliss, TX		Never deployed to Germany

== Population ==
Historical population

Year	Pop.	±% p.a.
1965	12,921	—
1970	13,436	+0.78%
1975	13,400	−0.05%
1980	13,759	+0.53%
1985	13,810	+0.07%
1990	14,442	+0.90%
1995	15,447	+1.35%

Year	Pop.	±% p.a.
2000	15,945	+0.64%
2005	15,929	−0.02%
2010	15,564	−0.46%
2015	14,914	−0.85%
2020	14,759	−0.21%
2025	15,050	+0.39%

Source: Landesdatabank Nordrhein-Westfalen

== Notable people ==
- Josef Heinen (1929–1988), sprinter
- Paul Veltrup (born 2001, fencer
- Clemens Weiss (born 1955), artist
