= Schwalm (Meuse) =

River in Germany and the Netherlands

Schwalm Swalm
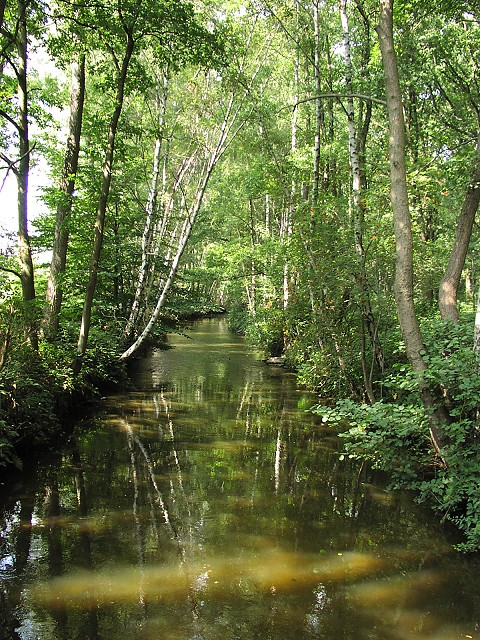
- Near Hariksee, Germany

Location
- Countries: Germany; Netherlands

Physical characteristics
- Source
  - location: near Wegberg
  - elevation: ±85 m (279 ft)
- Mouth
  - location: Meuse near Swalmen
  - coordinates: 51.2486°N 6.0102°E
- Length: 45.3 km (28.1 mi)
- Basin size: 269 km^{2} (104 sq mi)

Basin features
- Progression: Meuse→ North Sea

The Schwalm (German, pronounced [ʃvalm])) or Swalm (Dutch, pronounced [ˈsʋɑlm]), is a small river in Germany and the Netherlands, tributary to the river Meuse. Its source is near Wegberg, in the district Heinsberg, south-west of Mönchengladbach, in North Rhine-Westphalia (Germany). The Schwalm flows through Wegberg and Brüggen before flowing into the Meuse across the border with the Netherlands, in Swalmen. Its total length is 45 km.

== Sources ==
The original source region has since become an area of carr with poor water quality. The water of the Schwalm comes mainly from Rheinbraun's waste water pits. This brown coal open cast mine is required to feed the waste water into the surface water. Otherwise it would fill the mine, which is up to 230 metres deep.This is achieved by means of shafts (Schlitzschächten) through which the water flows back into the groundwater. If it were not for these shafts, the rivers Niers and Schwalm would long since have dried up. This would also destroy the mixed alder and ash wet woodland typical of the region.

== Course ==
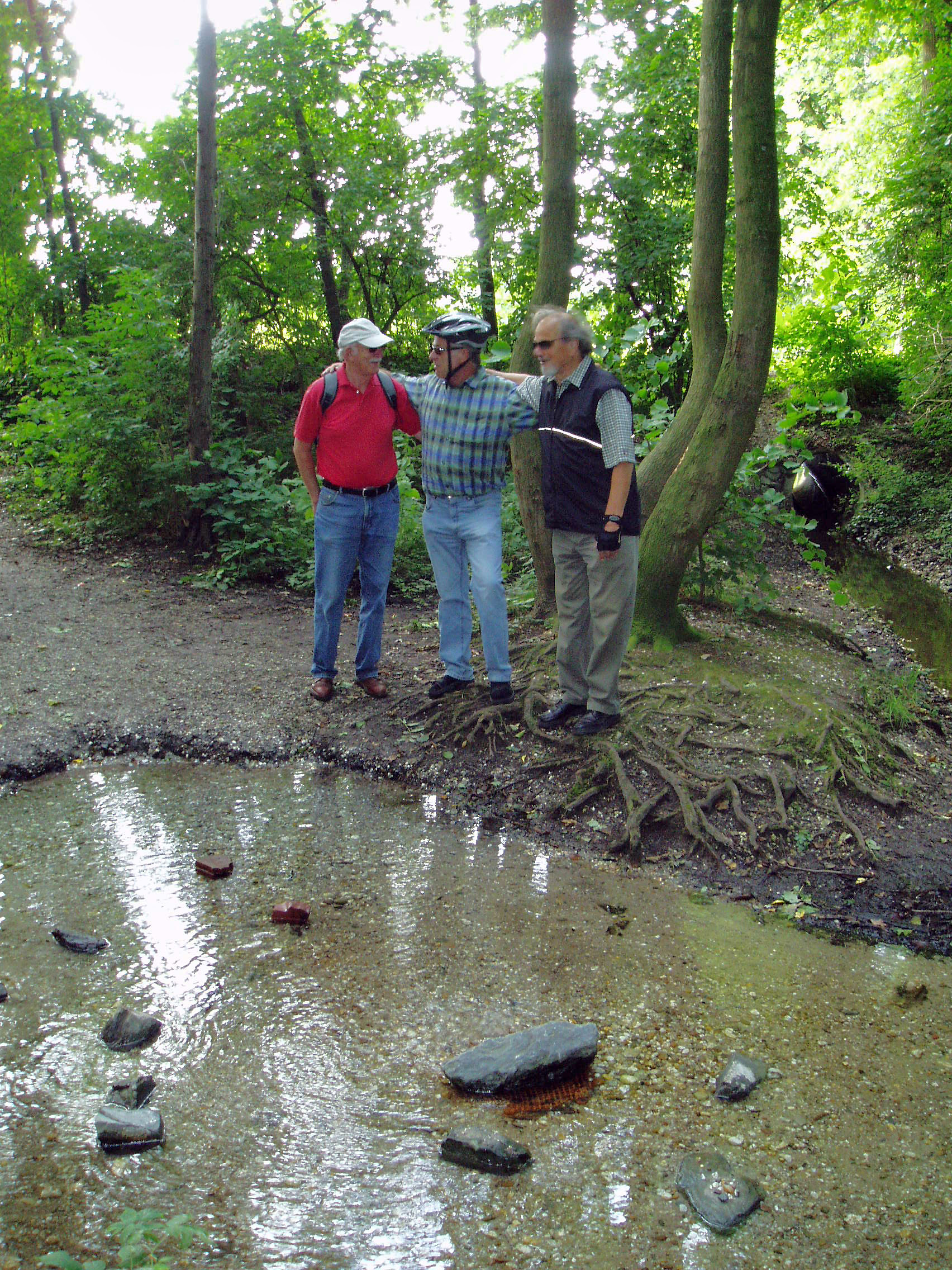
The source of the Schwalm

The source of the Schwalm is in a wetland area south of the German village of Wegberg-Tüschenbroich at an elevation of about 85 m above NN. From there the river flows mainly through the Maas-Schwalm-Nette Nature Park, its riverbed running between the rivers Rur, Nette and Niers.

Of its total length from this source to its mouth on the Meuse, near the village of Swalmen at about 12 m above NN, 13 kilometres of the river run through Dutch territory.

Parts of the river which, for example, run past the villages of Wegberg, Niederkrüchten, Schwalmtal, Brüggen-Born, Brüggen and Swalmen, form natural meanders.

The catchment area of the Schwalm is 268.7 square kilometres, of which around 27 square kilometres lie in the Netherlands.

== Tributaries ==
- Beeckbach
- Mühlenbach
- Knippertzbach
- Kranenbach
- Elmpter Bach

== Flora and fauna ==
The carr and heath/bog areas along the Schwalm provide a diverse habitat for fauna and flora. Frogs, dragonflies, damselflies, bluethroat, kingfisher and golden oriole are to be found as are water crowfoot, bog myrtle and other rare plants. brown trout, barbel and chub are at home in the river; along the river banks are also various members of the eter water rat family.
