= Martin Vincentz =

German politician (born 1986)

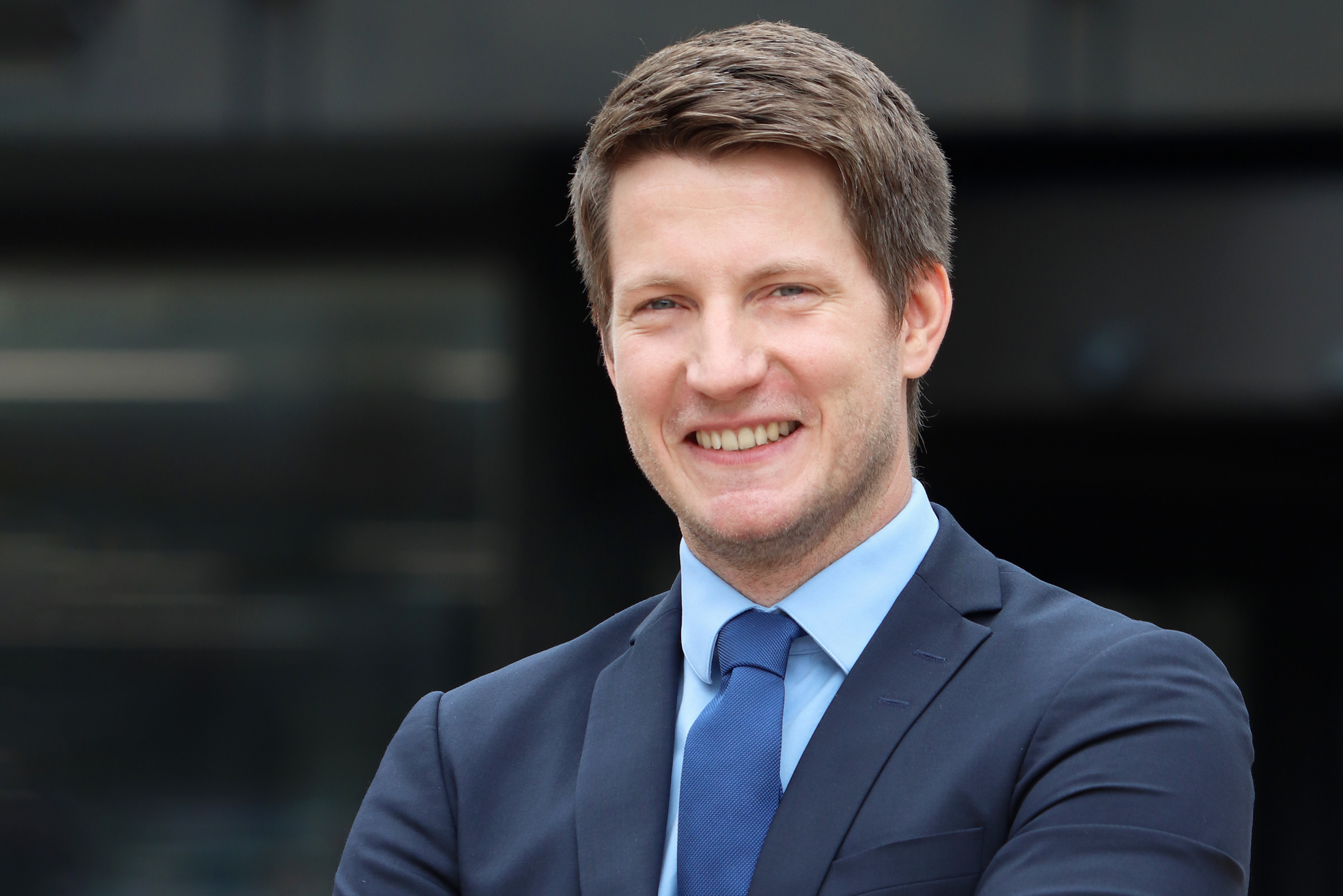
- Vincentz in 2022

Member of the Landtag of North Rhine-Westphalia
- Incumbent
- Assumed office 1 June 2017

Personal details
- Born: 22 April 1986 (age 39) Tönisvorst
- Party: Alternative for Germany (since 2014)

Martin Vincentz (born 22 April 1986 in Tönisvorst) is a German politician serving as a member of the Landtag of North Rhine-Westphalia since 2017. He has served as chairman of the Alternative for Germany in North Rhine-Westphalia and as group leader of the party in the Landtag since 2022.
