= Herbert Dörenberg =

German footballer

Personal information
- Date of birth: 27 August 1945
- Place of birth: Waldniel, Germany
- Position: Midfielder

Senior career*
Years	Team	Apps	(Gls)
1967–1972	Opel Rüsselsheim		
1972–1978	SV Darmstadt 98		
1978–1979	VfR Bürstadt		

Managerial career
- 1979–1980: VfR Bürstadt
- 1980–1983: 1. FSV Mainz 05
- 1983–1985: Eintracht Frankfurt II
- 1986–1989: SpVgg 05 Bad Homburg
- 1989–1990: SV Wehen
- 1990–1993: FSV Frankfurt
- 1994–1995: Sportfreunde Eisbachtal
- 1996–1997: SpVgg 05 Bad Homburg
- 1997–1998: FSV Frankfurt
- * Club domestic league appearances and goals

Herbert Dörenberg (born 27 August 1945) is a retired German football midfielder and later manager.
