= Wegberg =

- Town
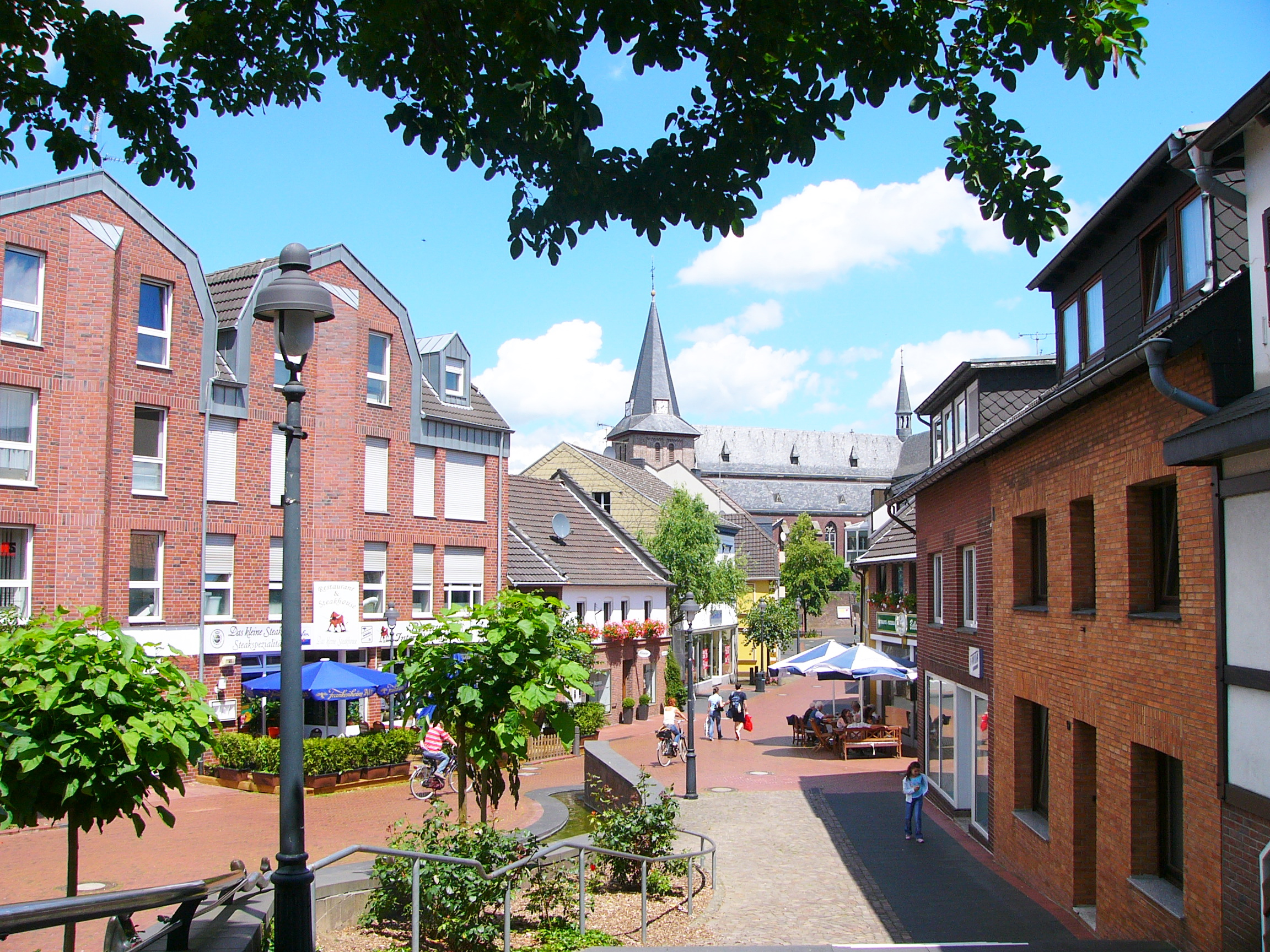
- Main street and pedestrian zone in Wegberg

- Flag Coat of arms

- Location of Wegberg within Heinsberg district
- Interactive map of Wegberg
- Location within Germany Location within North Rhine-Westphalia
- Coordinates: 51°08′30″N 6°16′45″E
- Country: Germany
- State: North Rhine-Westphalia
- Admin. region: Köln
- District: Heinsberg
- Subdivisions: 40

Government
  - Mayor (2020–25): Michael Stock (SPD)

Area
  - Total: 84.34 km^{2} (32.56 sq mi)
- Elevation: 61 m (200 ft)

Population (2025-12-31)
  - Total: 28,001
  - Density: 332.0/km^{2} (859.9/sq mi)
- Time zone: UTC+01:00 (CET)
  - Summer (DST): UTC+02:00 (CEST)
- Postal codes: 41844
- Dialling codes: 02434
- Vehicle registration: HS, ERK, GK
- Website: www.wegberg.de

Wegberg (German pronunciation: [ˈveːkbɛʁk]; Limburgish: Berk [ˈbæʀ(ə)k]) is the northernmost town in the district of Heinsberg in North Rhine-Westphalia, Germany.

== Geography ==
Wegberg is situated between Mönchengladbach in the northeast and Erkelenz in the southeast; the town of Rheindahlen is to the east. The city lies in the Naturpark Maas-Schwalm-Nette, a nature and wildlife park hugging the border to the Netherlands. Its name derives from the three rivers that define its boundaries.

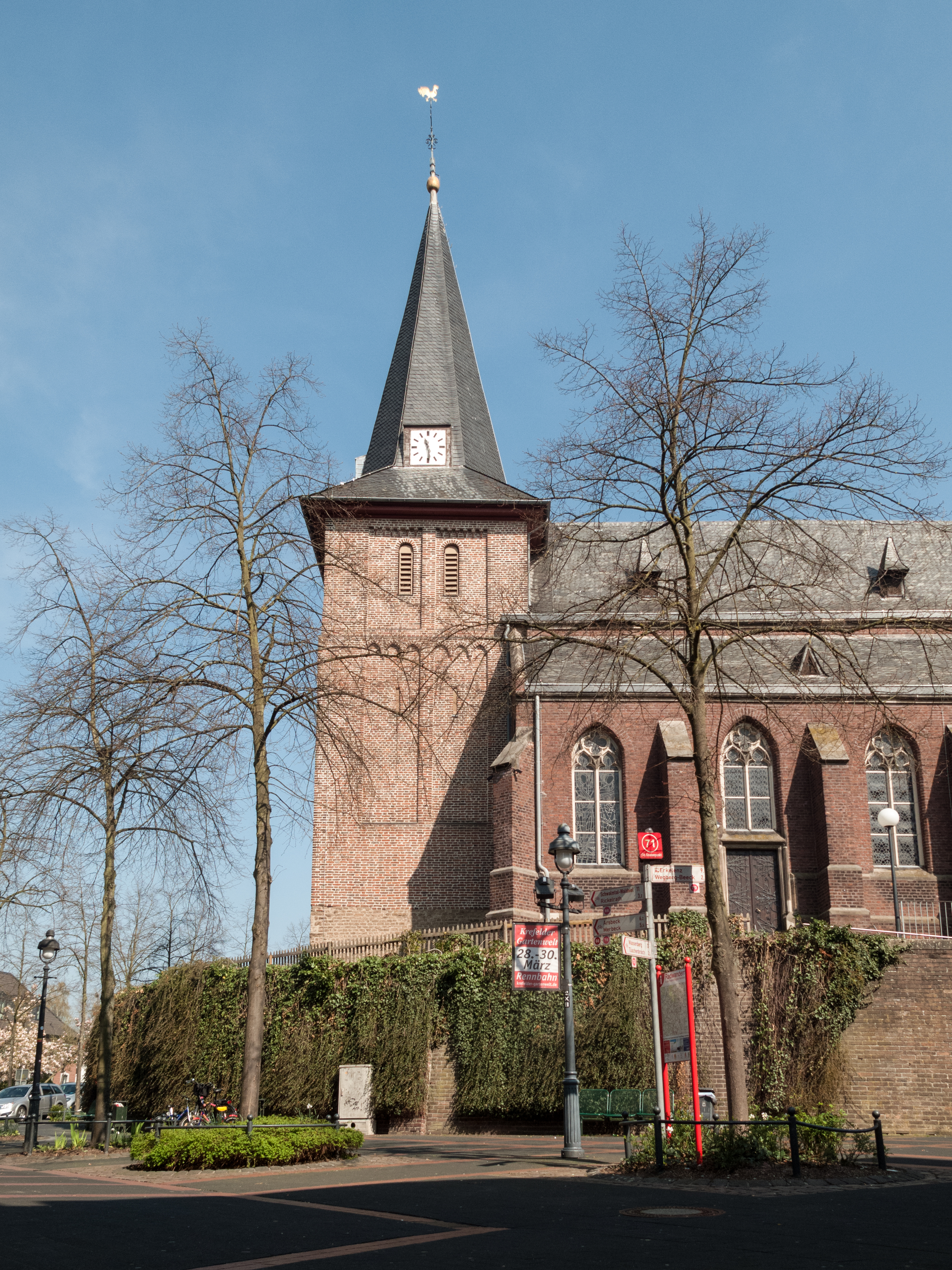
Church: die Pfarrkirche Sankt Peter und Paul

== History ==
The first mention of Wegberg under the name of Berck is in a document dating from during the reign of Otto I, dated 966.

Its modern-day name appeared around the 14th century, and derives from the city's location on an old Roman road.

The many castles and defense structures (the so-called Motten, sngl. Motte) that dot the area in whole or as ruins are indications of a history of martial as well as raiding forays in and around Wegberg. One infamous stronghold that remains the focal point of many anecdotes is the castle of a robber baron located in nearby Gripekoven. The castle with its walls and swampy trenches was deemed impregnable until 1354, when it was successfully besieged and razed. Today, only a small hill hints at its former location.

From 1543 on, Wegberg was divided between the duchy of Geldern (Guelders) and the duchy of Jülich. The border ran across the city, formed by the rivers Schwalm and Beeckbach. In this period, Wegberg effectively had two mayors. Only in 1816, after the district fell to Prussia, was the division removed. In 1935 the two townships of Wegberg and Beeck were merged.

The city as it exists today emerged from the restructuring of cities and municipalities of 1972, and on July 5, 1973, Wegberg was granted the right to use the official name Stadt Wegberg ("City of Wegberg").

== Population ==
Historical population

Year	Pop.	±% p.a.
1965	20,098	—
1970	22,152	+1.97%
1975	24,184	+1.77%
1980	24,645	+0.38%
1985	24,553	−0.07%
1990	25,445	+0.72%
1995	26,989	+1.19%

Year	Pop.	±% p.a.
2000	28,543	+1.13%
2005	29,580	+0.72%
2010	29,100	−0.33%
2015	27,827	−0.89%
2020	28,130	+0.22%
2025	28,001	−0.09%

Source: Landesdatabank Nordrhein-Westfalen

== Things of note ==
Eight kilometers of the city's border are also the national border of Germany and the Netherlands.

The local Flachsmuseum ("Flax Museum") depicts the legacy of flax in the city's agricultural history.

The Museum für europäische Volkstrachten shows regional costumes of Europe.

The township of Wildenrath is home to a permanent exhibition, titled "Bionic".

The River Schwalm features many historic watermills, many of which are in good shape and often used as hotels or restaurants.

Special mention must be made of the Grenzlandring ("border-region ring"). Completed in 1938 or 1939 for World War II strategic reasons, the 9 km long egg-shaped oval road that circles Wegberg and its neighboring township Beeck gained international renown as a racing track with its five events between 1948 and 1952, attracting up to 300,000 spectators. The Grenzlandring was falsely claimed by some German media to be the world's fastest racing track until a fatal accident happened on 31 August 1952 (in which 13 or 14 spectators were killed and another 42 wounded), putting an immediate end to its use. Today, it serves in distributing road traffic away from the inner city, minimizing congestion and there is nothing left that reminds of its rather short motor sports history.

Wegberg was the home of an RAF hospital from 1953 to 1996. The RAF Hospital Wegberg was a hospital located in Wegberg, near the Holtmühlenweiher with its ancient watermill called Holtmühle. It was opened as a fully functioning general hospital in 1953 and closed in 1996. A small mental health unit remained and the offices were used for the administration of the British Forces Germany Health Service. These facilities moved to JHQ Rheindahlen and the hospital buildings and grounds were handed over to the German authorities in October 2010.

The hospital's motto is "Inter Fera Salus" and its crest is a wild boar passant overlaid with a Staff of Asclepius.

The former RAF Wildenrath airfield also belongs to Wegberg and has been converted to train testing grounds for Siemens.

== International relations ==
Wegberg is twinned with:

- Echt-Susteren, Netherlands
- Maaseik, Belgium

== Notable people ==
- Udo Pastörs (born 1952), German politician (NPD)
- David Phillips (born 1963), Welsh footballer
- Alan Neilson (born 1972), Welsh footballer
- Nicole Faraday (born 1976), British actress and singer
- Chris Clarkson MP (born 1982), British politician (Conservative)
- Simon Carlton Rhodes (born 1965), Rugby Union Coach
