= Brüggen Castle =

Coordinates: 51°14′25″N 6°11′09″E

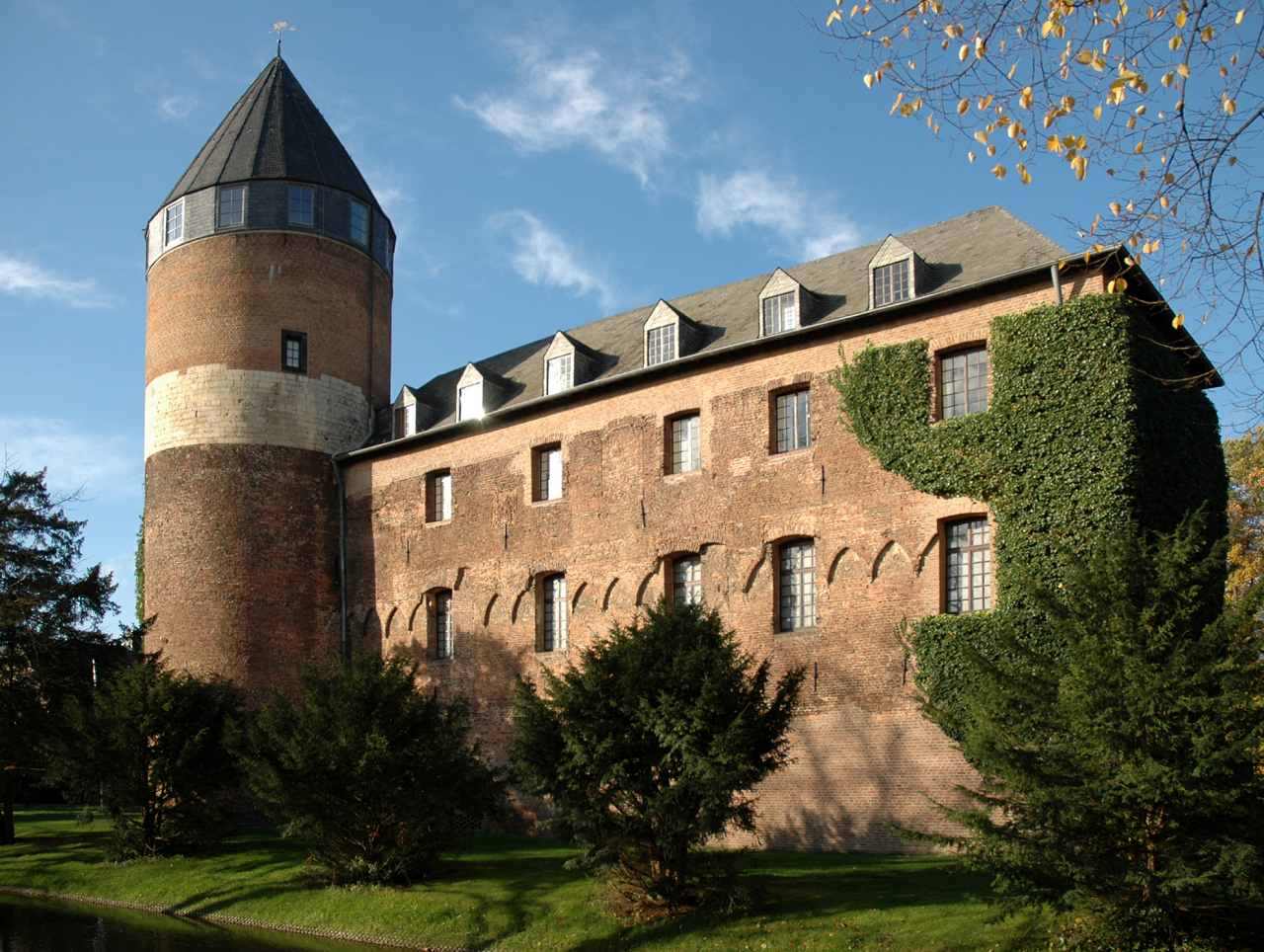
Brüggen Castle from the east

Brüggen Castle (German: Burg Brüggen) is a water castle in the southeastern part of the Lower Rhine municipality of Brüggen in North Rhine-Westphalia. It was the most important castle in the north of the Duchy of Jülich.

The castle was built by the Count of Kessel in the 13th century to guard a ford over the River Schwalm. In the early 14th century it went into the possession of the dukes of Jülich, who had the existing building replaced by a quadrangular castle made from brick. After the occupation of Brüggen in 1794 by Napoleonic troops it was confiscated and resold by the French government to a private individual at the beginning of the 19th century. Today part of the castle houses a hunting and natural history museum.

== Literature ==
- Paul Clemen (ed.): Die Kunstdenkmäler des Kreises Kempen. L. Schwann, Düsseldorf, 1891 (Die Kunstdenkmäler der Rheinprovinz. Vol.1, Part 1), pp. 23–27 (online)
- Bernhard Gondorf, Werner Otto: Burgen und Schlösser. Höhepunkte niederrheinischer Baukunst. Mercator, Duisburg, 1991, ISBN 3-87463-172-9, p. 53.
- Manfred A. Jülicher: Burg Brüggen im Wechsel der Geschichte. Eigenverlag, Niederkrüchten 1979.
- Gregor Spohr: Wie schön hier, zu verträumen. Schlösser am Niederrhein. Pomp, Bottrop/Essen, 2001, ISBN 3-89355-228-6, pp. 14–17.
- Jens Wroblewski; André Wemmers (2001). Theiss-Burgenführer Niederrhein [Theiss Castle Guide Lower Rhine] (in German). Stuttgart: Konrad Theiss. pp. 40–41. ISBN 3-8062-1612-6.
