= Tönisvorst =

- Town
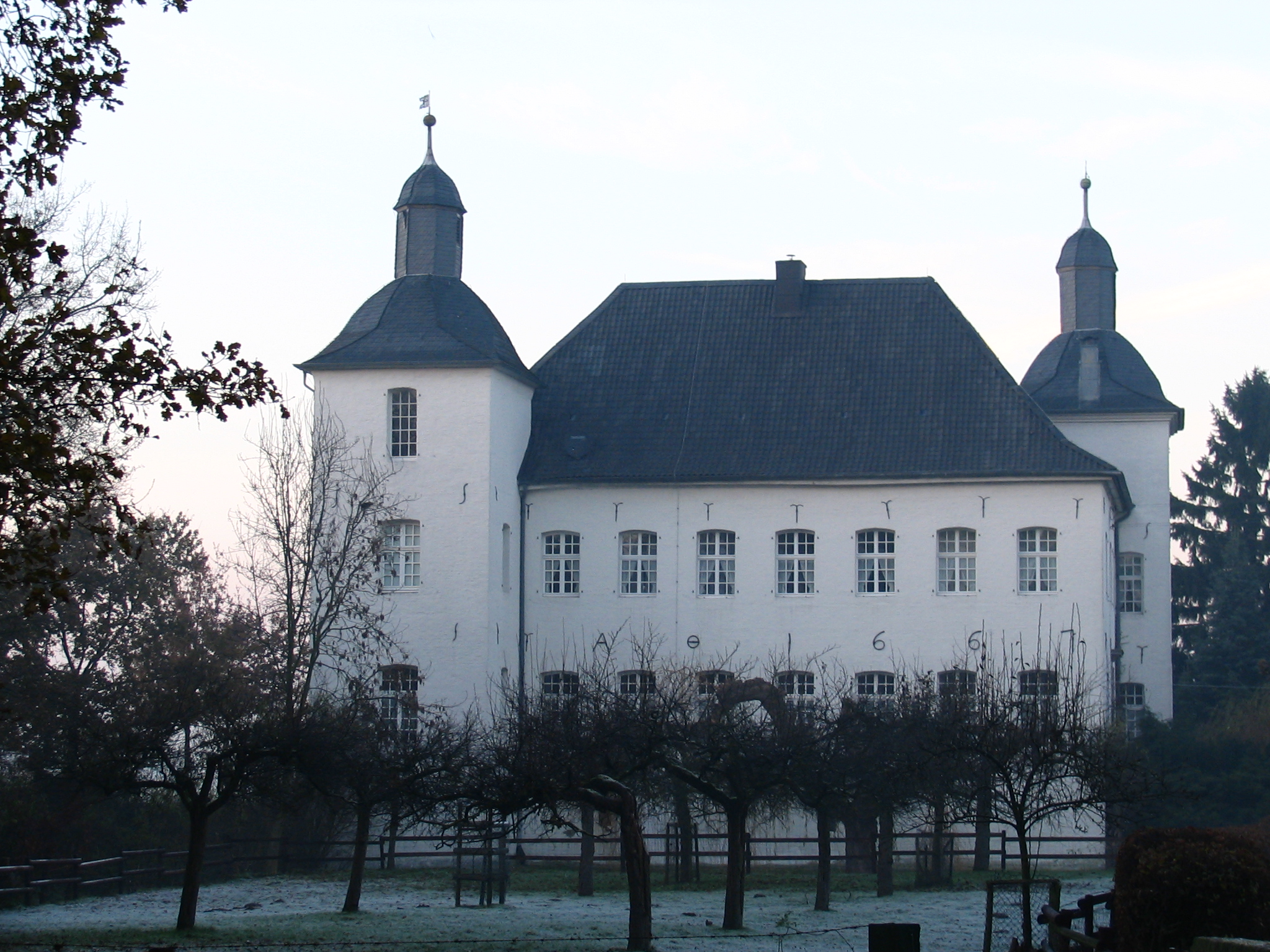
- Castle

- Flag Coat of arms

- Location of Tönisvorst within Viersen district
- Interactive map of Tönisvorst
- Location within Germany Location within North Rhine-Westphalia
- Coordinates: 51°19′15″N 6°29′35″E
- Country: Germany
- State: North Rhine-Westphalia
- Admin. region: Düsseldorf
- District: Viersen
- Subdivisions: 2

Government
  - Mayor (2020–25): Uwe Leuchtenberg (SPD)

Area
  - Total: 44.34 km^{2} (17.12 sq mi)
- Elevation: 36 m (118 ft)

Population (2025-12-31)
  - Total: 29,296
  - Density: 660.7/km^{2} (1,711/sq mi)
- Time zone: UTC+01:00 (CET)
  - Summer (DST): UTC+02:00 (CEST)
- Postal codes: 47918
- Dialling codes: 0 21 51 (St. Tönis); 0 21 56 (Vorst)
- Vehicle registration: VIE
- Website: www.toenisvorst.de

Tönisvorst (German: [ˈtøːnɪsˌfɔʁst, ˌtøːnɪsˈfɔʁst]) is a town in the district of Viersen, in North Rhine-Westphalia, Germany. It is situated approximately 5 km west of Krefeld. The town is particularly known for its apple cultivation and orchards, and bears the official nickname Apfelstadt am Niederrhein ("Apple Town on the Lower Rhine").

On 25 July 2019, weather stations in Duisburg-Baerl and Tönisvorst both recorded temperatures of 41.2 °C (106.2 °F), which is the 6th highest temperature to have ever been recorded in Germany.

== Population ==
Historical population

Year	Pop.	±% p.a.
1965	18,605	—
1970	19,872	+1.33%
1975	21,994	+2.05%
1980	22,225	+0.21%
1985	22,070	−0.14%
1990	24,844	+2.40%
1995	28,385	+2.70%

Year	Pop.	±% p.a.
2000	30,347	+1.35%
2005	30,238	−0.07%
2010	29,699	−0.36%
2015	29,296	−0.27%
2020	29,249	−0.03%
2025	29,296	+0.03%

Source: Landesdatabank Nordrhein-Westfalen

== Historical monuments ==
- Das alte Rathaus, St. Tönis
- Der Mertenshof, St. Tönis
- Schluff (steam locomotive), St. Tönis
- Haus Raedt, Vorst
- Haus Brempt, Vorst
- Haus Neersdonk, Vorst
- Haus Donk, Vorst
- Der Gelleshof

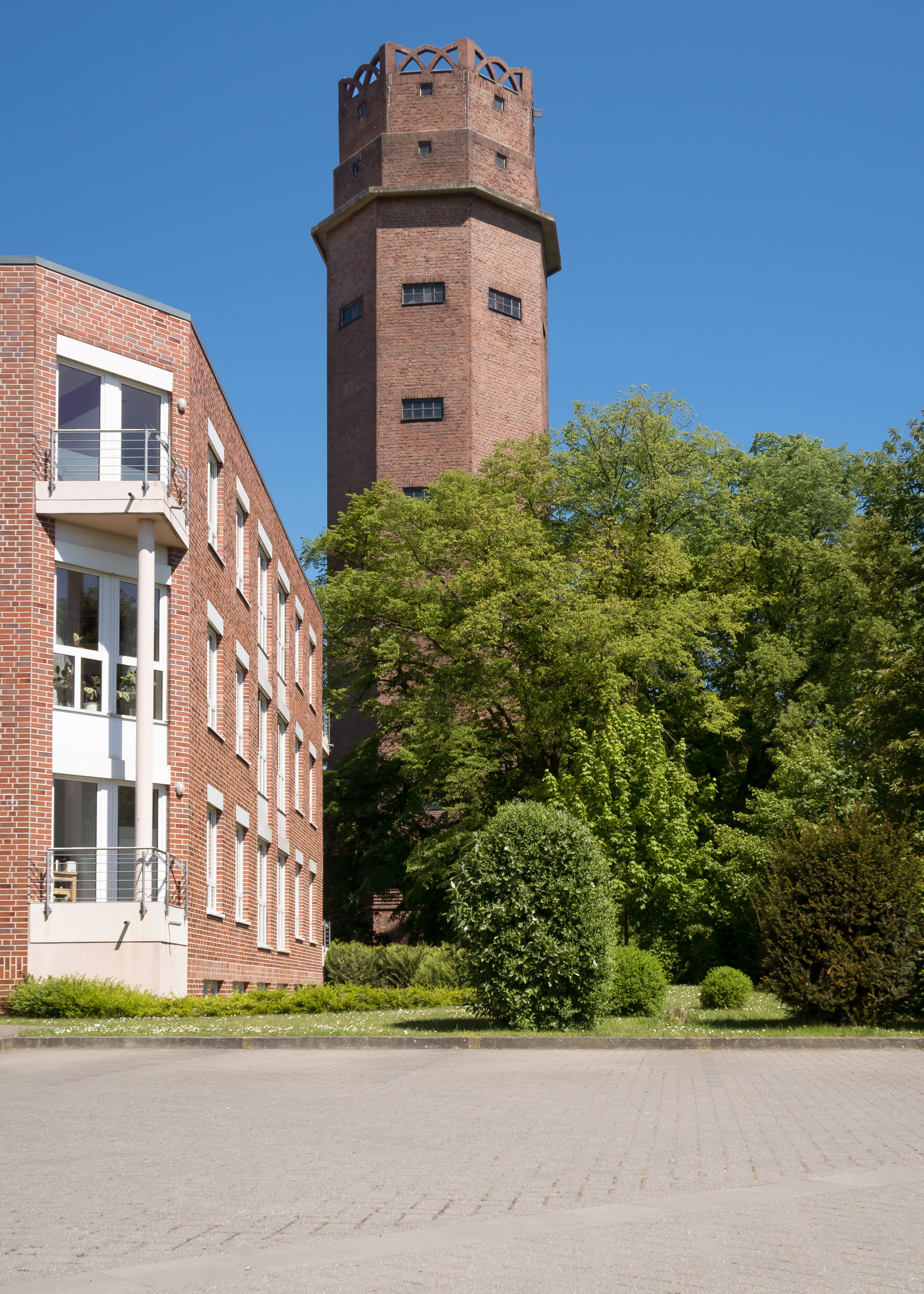
Sankt Tönis, tower: der Wasserturm

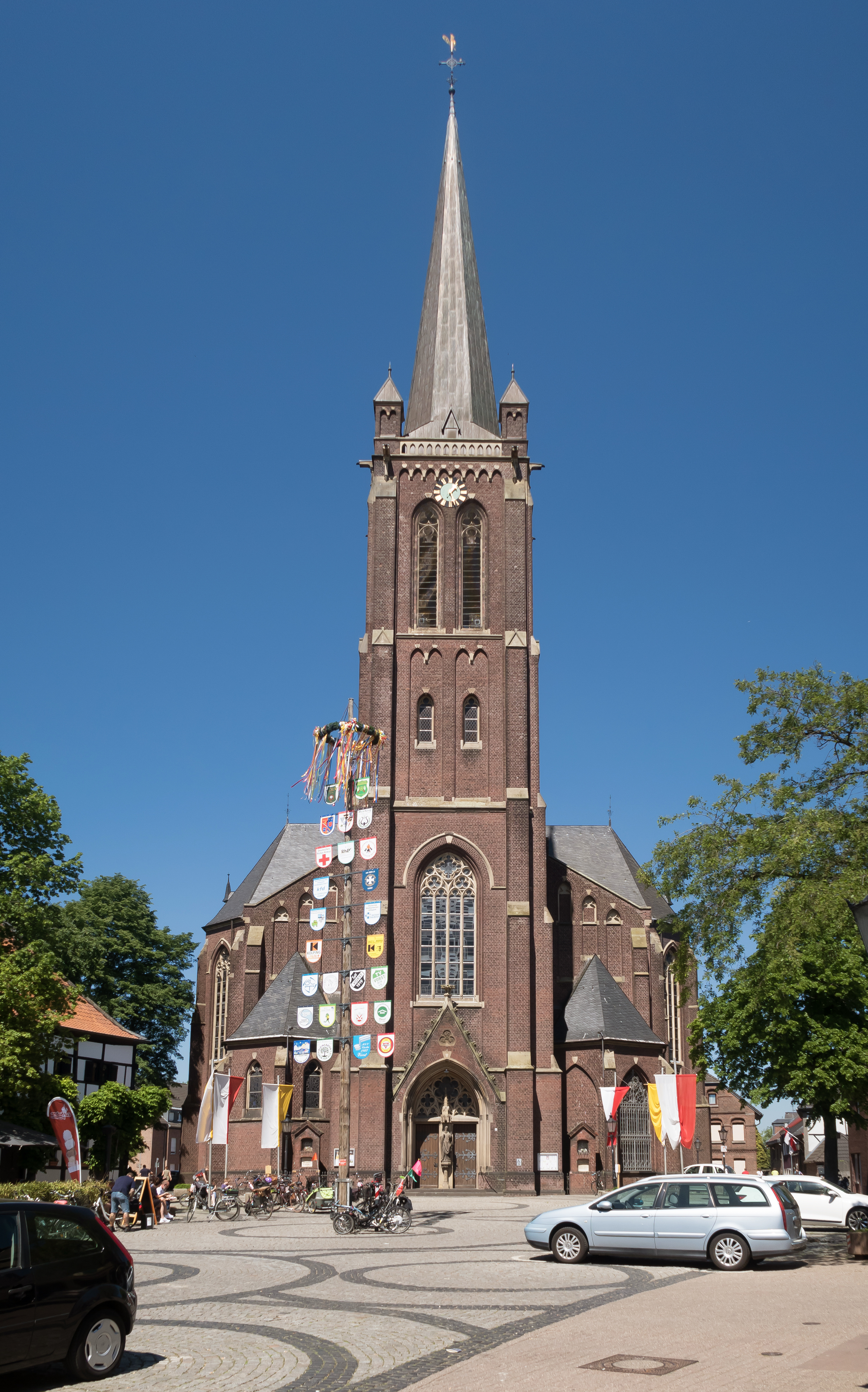
Vorst, church: Pfarrkirche Sankt Godehard

== Twin towns – sister cities ==
Tönisvorst is twinned with:

- Laakdal, Belgium
- Sées, France
- Staré Město, Czech Republic

== Notable people ==
- Hans Junkermann (born 1934), racing cyclist
- Klaus Abbelen (born 1960), racing driver and former executive director of Abbelen GmbH
- Tobias Levels (born 1986), footballer
- Martin Vincentz (born 1986), politician
- Lea Schüller (born 1997), footballer for the Germany national team
- Tim Stützle (born 2002), professional ice hockey player
