= Nette (Niers) =

River in Germany

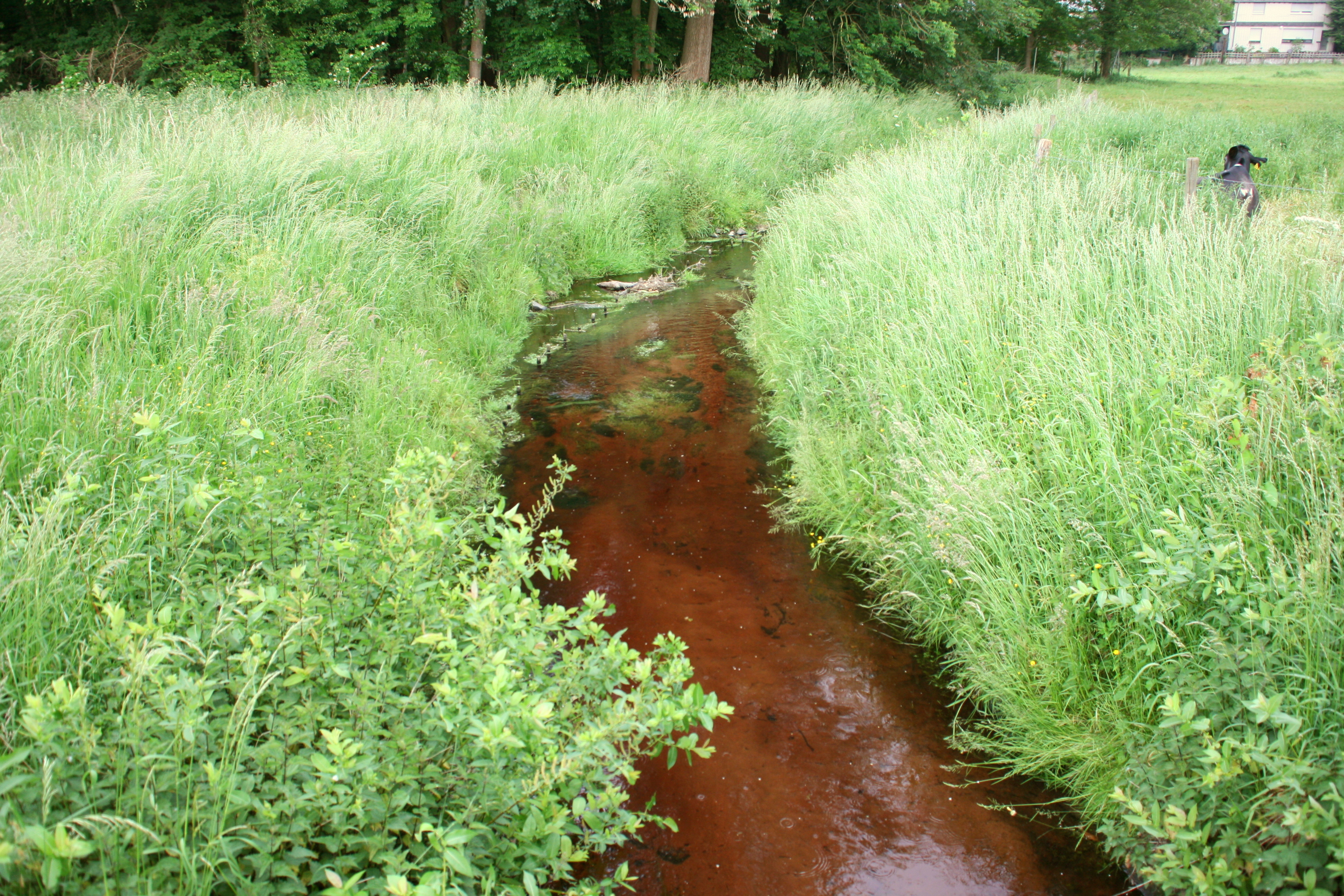
- Nette in Boisheim

Location
- Country: Germany
- State: North Rhine-Westphalia

Physical characteristics
- Source
  - location: North Rhine-Westphalia
- Mouth
  - location: Niers
  - coordinates: 51.4144°N 6.3237°E
- Length: 28.3 km (17.6 mi)
- Basin size: 166 km^{2} (64 sq mi)

Basin features
- Progression: Niers→ Meuse→ North Sea

The Nette (German pronunciation: [ˈnɛtə]) is a small river in North Rhine-Westphalia, Germany, a left tributary of the Niers. It rises near Dülken, a borough of Viersen. The Nette flows through Viersen-Boisheim and Nettetal before reaching the Niers in Wachtendonk. Its total length is 28 kilometres (17 mi); its drainage area is 166 km^{2} (64 sq mi).

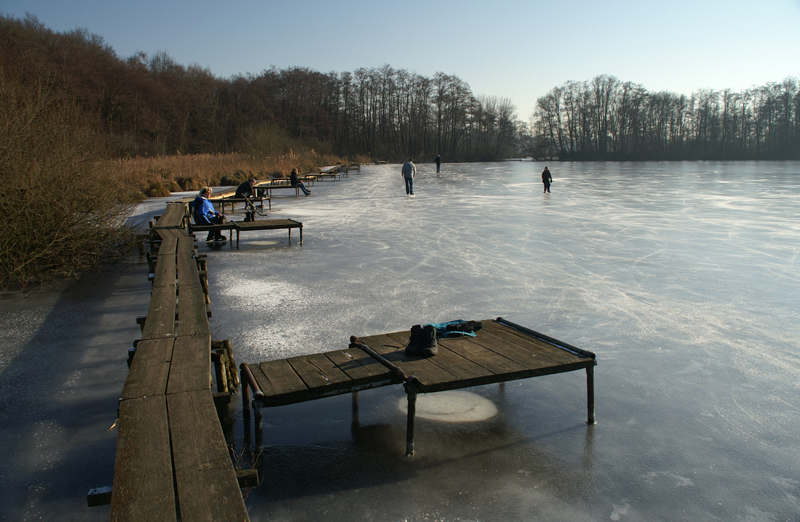
The Poelvennsee in Winter

== Lakes ==
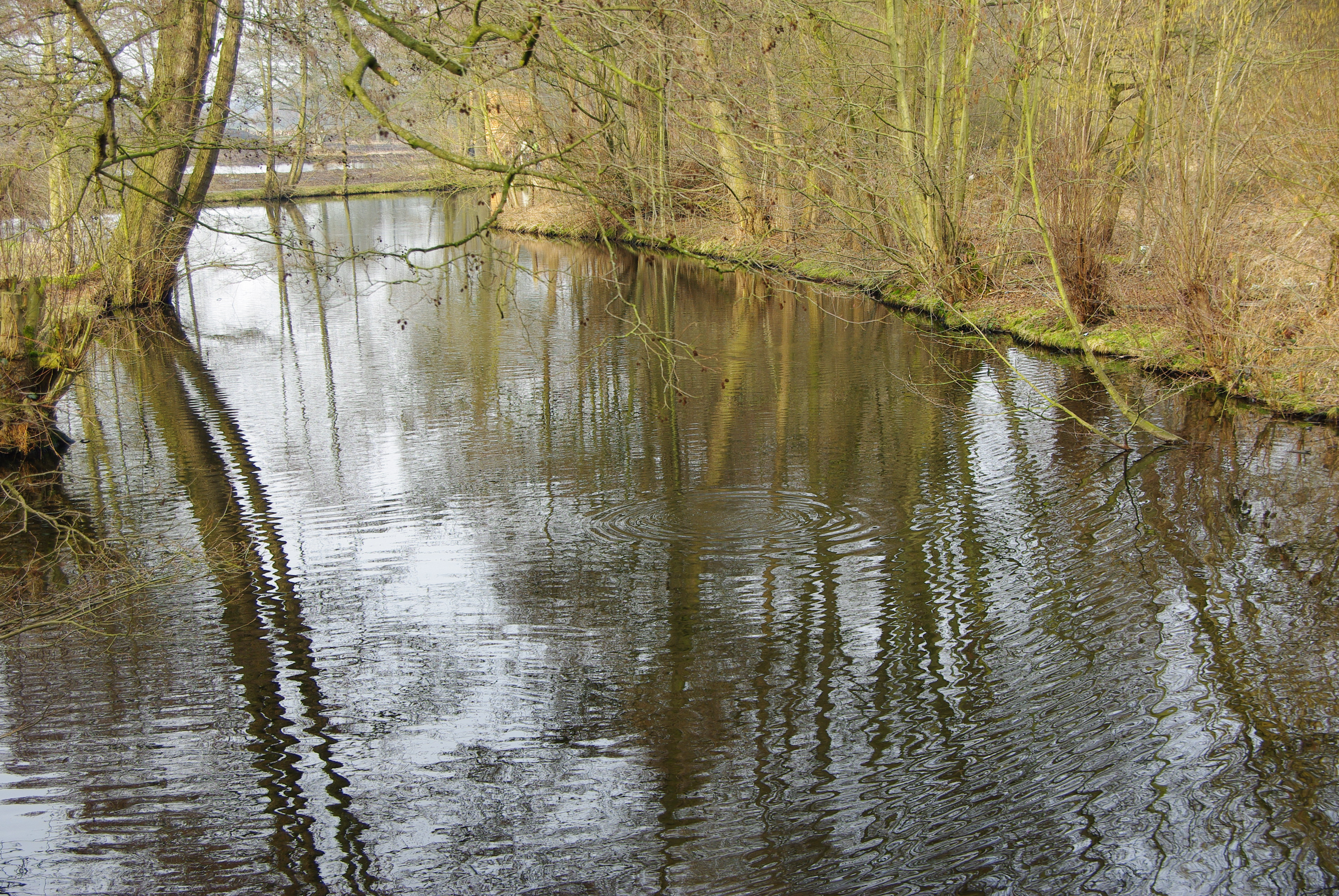
The Nette between Großer de Wittsee and Schrolik

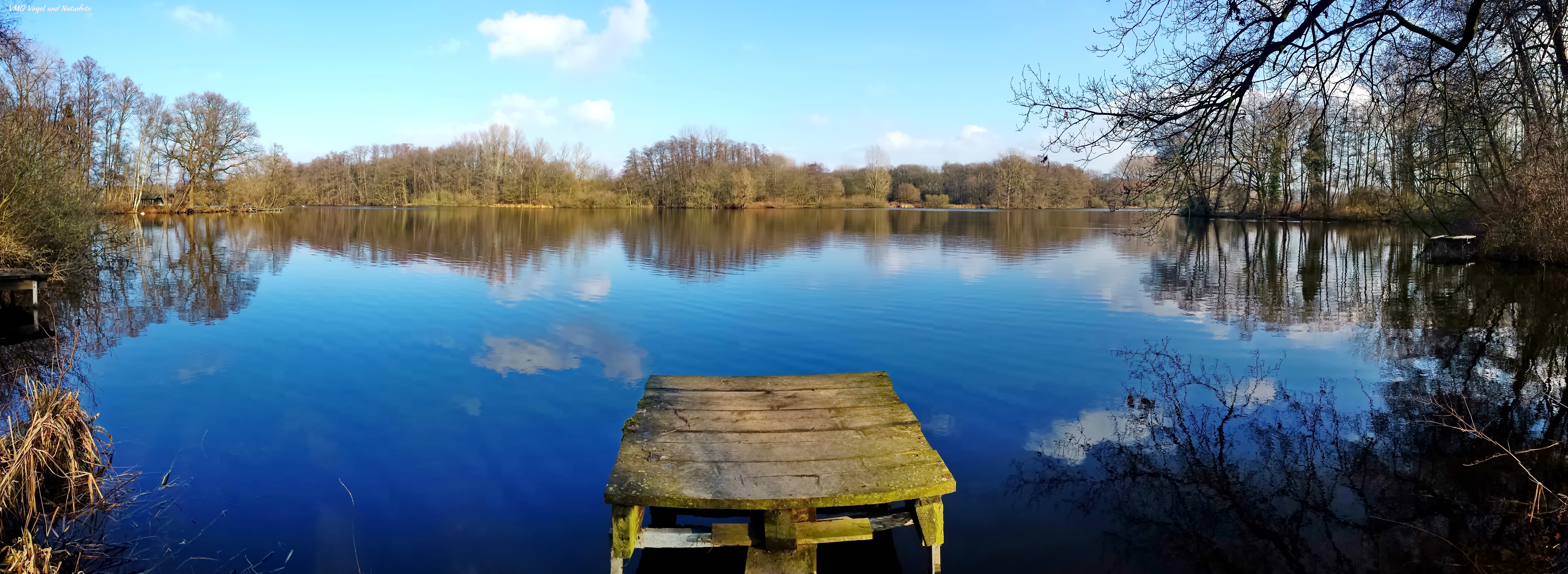
Großer de Wittsee

The Nette passes nine lakes on its way to Wachtendonk

- Kleiner Breyeller See c. 5.3 ha
- Großer Breyeller See c. 9.2 ha
- Nettebruch c. 13.2 ha
- Windmühlenbruch c. 6 ha
- Ferkensbruch c. 4.5 ha
- Kleiner de Wittsee c. 4.5 ha
- Großer de Wittsee c. 22.5 ha
- Schrolik c. 15.5 ha
- Poelvennsee c. 24.5 ha

The Maas-Schwalm-Nette Nature Park is named after the river.
