= Brüggen, Germany =

Brüggen
- Municipality
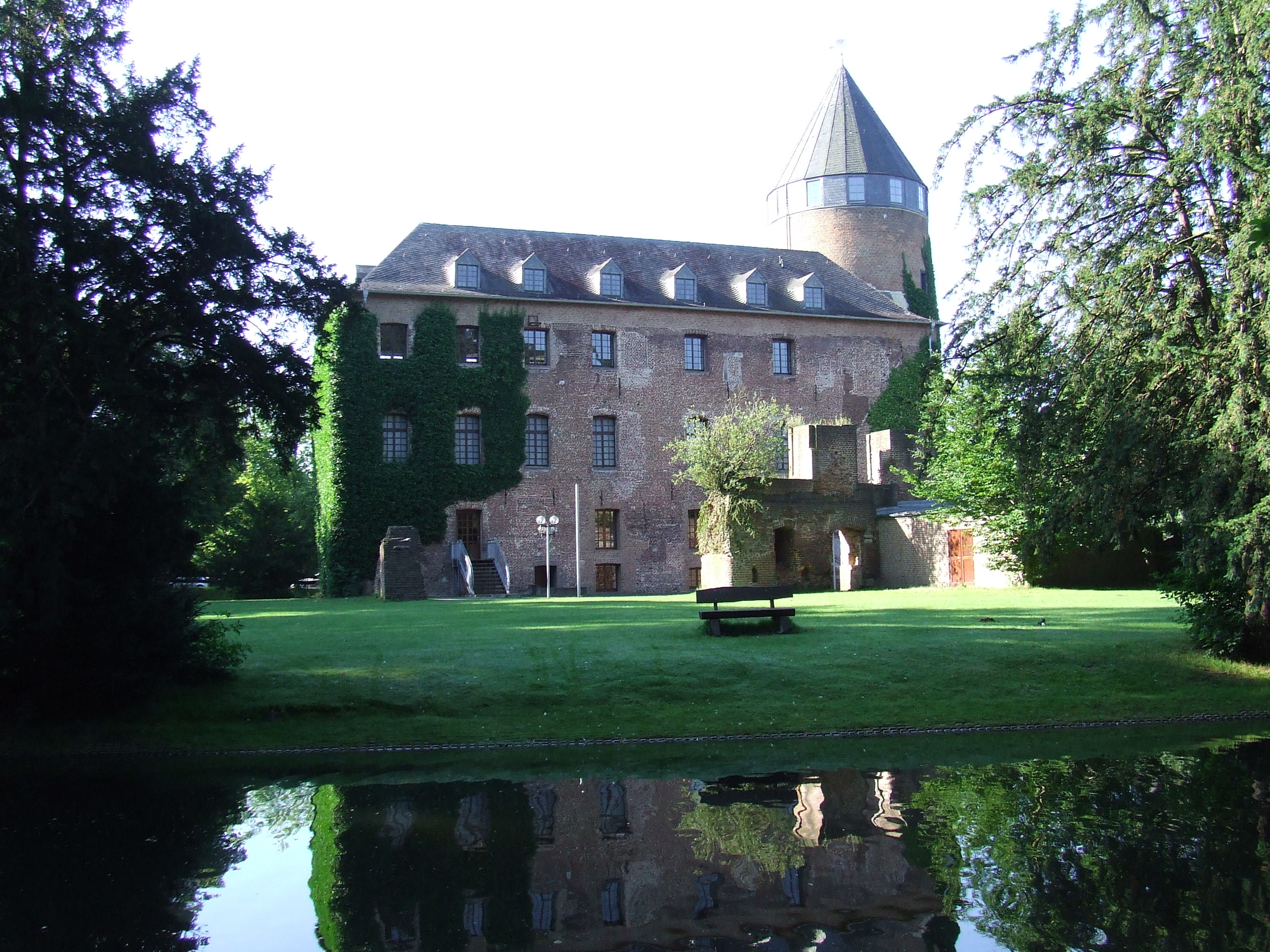
- Brüggen Castle

- Coat of arms

- Location of Brüggen within Viersen district
- Interactive map of Brüggen
- Location within Germany Location within North Rhine-Westphalia
- Coordinates: 51°14′30″N 06°10′56″E
- Country: Germany
- State: North Rhine-Westphalia
- Admin. region: Düsseldorf
- District: Viersen
- Subdivisions: 3

Government
  - Mayor (2020–25): Frank Gellen (CDU)

Area
  - Total: 61.2 km^{2} (23.6 sq mi)
- Elevation: 50 m (160 ft)

Population (2025-12-31)
  - Total: 16,204
  - Density: 265/km^{2} (686/sq mi)
- Time zone: UTC+01:00 (CET)
  - Summer (DST): UTC+02:00 (CEST)
- Postal codes: 41379
- Dialling codes: 0 21 63; 0 21 57 (Bracht)
- Vehicle registration: VIE (until 1975: KK)
- Website: www.brueggen.de

Brüggen (German pronunciation: [ˈbʁʏɡn̩]) is a municipality in the district of Viersen, in North Rhine-Westphalia, Germany. It is situated near the border with the Netherlands, on the river Schwalm, approx. 15 km south of Venlo, 11 km east of Swalmen (Roermond) and 20 km north-west of Mönchengladbach.

== Division of the town ==
Brüggen consists of 3 subdivisions

- Brüggen
- Born
- Bracht

== Population ==
Historical population

Year	Pop.	±% p.a.
1965	10,713	—
1970	11,832	+2.01%
1975	12,019	+0.31%
1980	12,401	+0.63%
1985	12,677	+0.44%
1990	13,504	+1.27%
1995	14,929	+2.03%

Year	Pop.	±% p.a.
2000	15,863	+1.22%
2005	16,211	+0.43%
2010	15,871	−0.42%
2015	15,648	−0.28%
2020	15,934	+0.36%
2025	16,204	+0.34%

Source: Landesdatabank Nordrhein-Westfalen

== Mayors ==
- Frank Gellen (CDU): since 2014
- Gerhard Gottwald: 1989–2014

== Sights ==
- Brüggen Castle
- Natural History Museum (Naturkundemuseum): since 1979 Brüggen Castle has been home to a regional hunting and natural history museum with a nature park information point.
- Schwalmpforte, a former town gate
- St. Nicholas' Church
- Old Abbey of the Knights of the Cross (Kreuzherrenkloster)
- Born Mill (Borner Mühle)
- Brüggen Mill (Brüggener Mühle)
- Schloss Dilborn
- Old toll house with Rentei (~treasury)
- Nature and Wildlife Park (Natur und Tierpark Brüggen)
- New Jewish Cemetery
- Old Jewish Cemetery

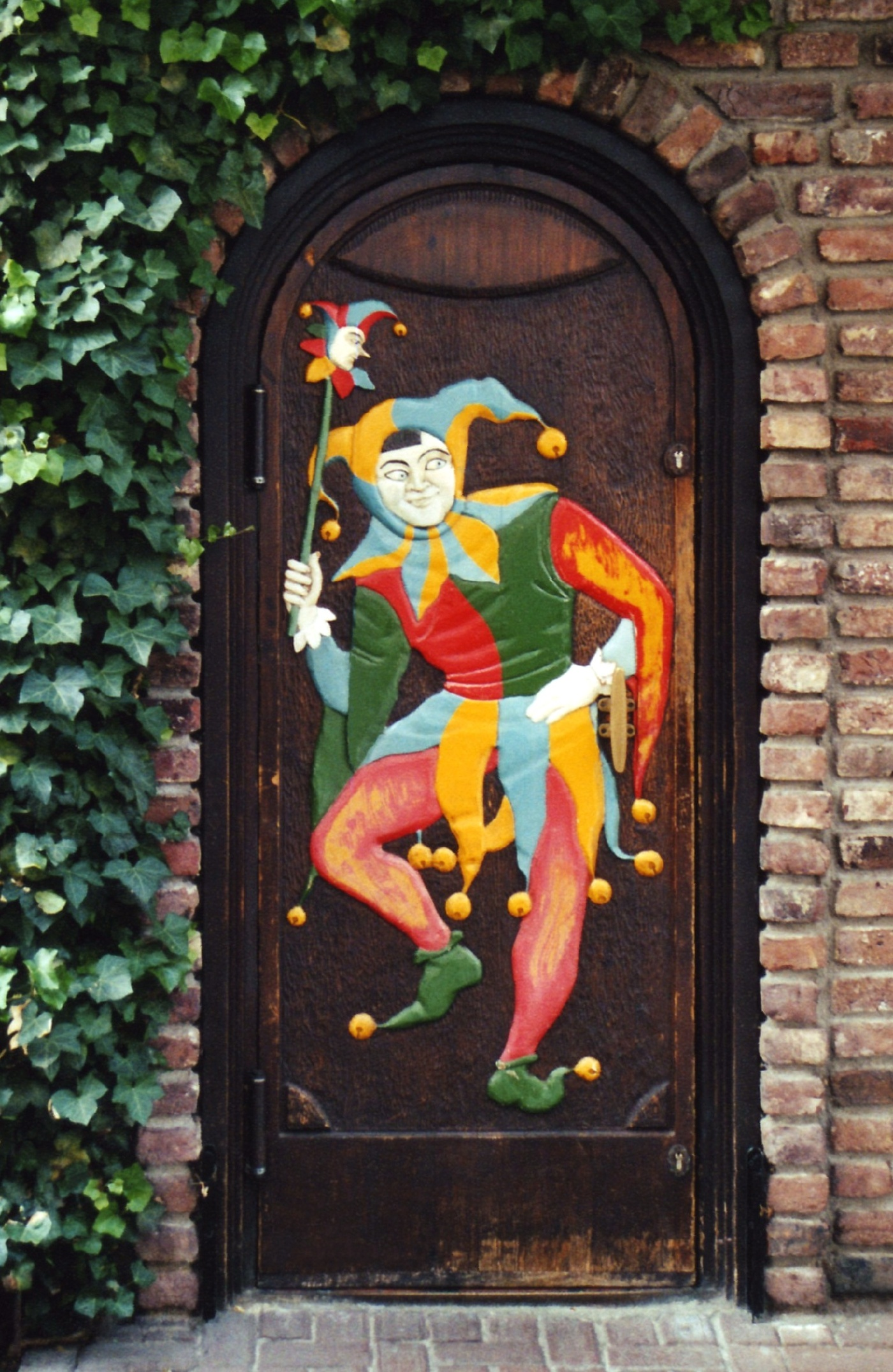
A jester on the entrance door of the Kaschemme, a pub-café in Brüggen's old town

== Climate ==
Climate in this area has mild differences between highs and lows, and there is adequate rainfall year-round. The Köppen Climate Classification subtype for this climate is "Cfb" (Marine West Coast Climate/Oceanic climate).

Climate data for Brüggen, Germany
Month	Jan	Feb	Mar	Apr	May	Jun	Jul	Aug	Sep	Oct	Nov	Dec	Year
Mean daily maximum °C (°F)	4 (39)	5 (41)	9 (49)	13 (56)	17 (63)	21 (69)	22 (72)	22 (71)	19 (66)	14 (58)	8 (47)	6 (42)	13 (56)
Mean daily minimum °C (°F)	0 (32)	−1 (31)	2 (36)	4 (40)	8 (46)	11 (52)	13 (56)	13 (55)	11 (52)	7 (45)	4 (39)	2 (36)	6 (43)
Average precipitation mm (inches)	64 (2.5)	56 (2.2)	43 (1.7)	46 (1.8)	64 (2.5)	69 (2.7)	84 (3.3)	84 (3.3)	76 (3)	46 (1.8)	64 (2.5)	64 (2.5)	760 (29.8)
Source: Weatherbase

== See also ==
- Royal Air Force Station Brüggen

== Personalities ==
- Simon Jentzsch (born 1976), footballer
