= Wachtendonk =

- Municipality
- Flag Coat of arms

- Location of Wachtendonk within Kleve district
- Interactive map of Wachtendonk
- Location within Germany Location within North Rhine-Westphalia
- Coordinates: 51°24′33″N 6°20′16″E
- Country: Germany
- State: North Rhine-Westphalia
- Admin. region: Düsseldorf
- District: Kleve
- Subdivisions: 2

Government
  - Mayor (2020–25): Paul Robert Hoene

Area
  - Total: 48.17 km^{2} (18.60 sq mi)
- Elevation: 29 m (95 ft)

Population (2025-12-31)
  - Total: 8,154
  - Density: 169.3/km^{2} (438.4/sq mi)
- Time zone: UTC+01:00 (CET)
  - Summer (DST): UTC+02:00 (CEST)
- Postal codes: 47669
- Dialling codes: 0 28 36
- Vehicle registration: KLE
- Website: www.wachtendonk.de

Wachtendonk (German pronunciation: [ˈvaxtn̩dɔŋk]) at the confluence of Niers River and Nette River is a municipality in the district of Kleve in North Rhine-Westphalia, Germany. It is located west of the Rhine halfway between Duisburg and Venlo at the Dutch border. Its name means 'bailiff's Donk'.

== Population ==
Historical population

Year	Pop.	±% p.a.
1965	5,753	—
1970	5,862	+0.38%
1975	5,749	−0.39%
1980	5,772	+0.08%
1985	6,087	+1.07%
1990	6,392	+0.98%
1995	7,185	+2.37%

Year	Pop.	±% p.a.
2000	7,576	+1.07%
2005	7,841	+0.69%
2010	7,888	+0.12%
2015	8,189	+0.75%
2020	8,107	−0.20%
2025	8,154	+0.12%

Source: Landesdatabank Nordrhein-Westfalen

== Gallery ==
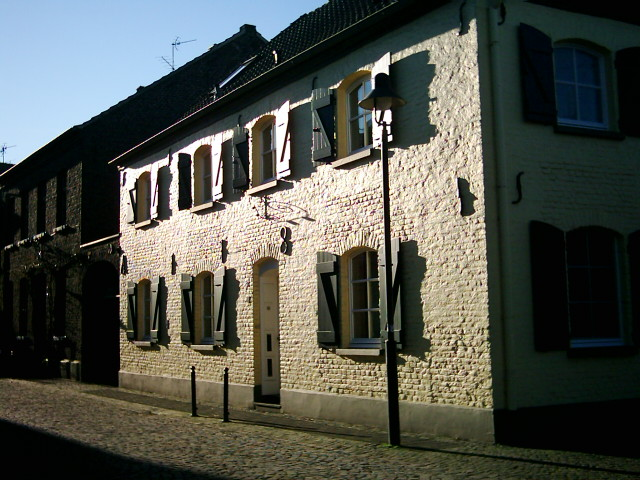
Feldstrasse

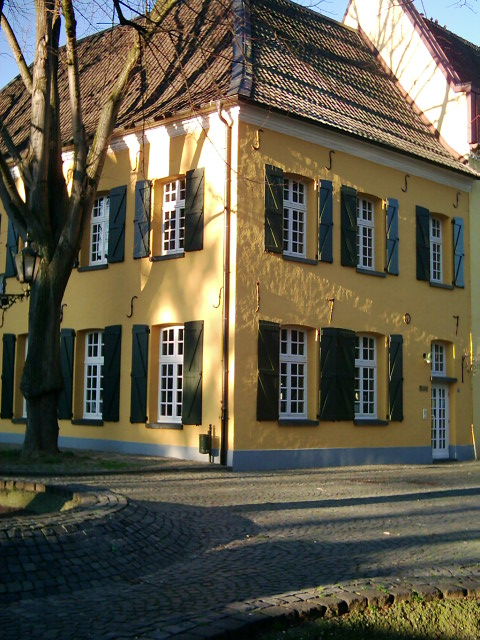
Old Monastery 'Thal Josaphat'

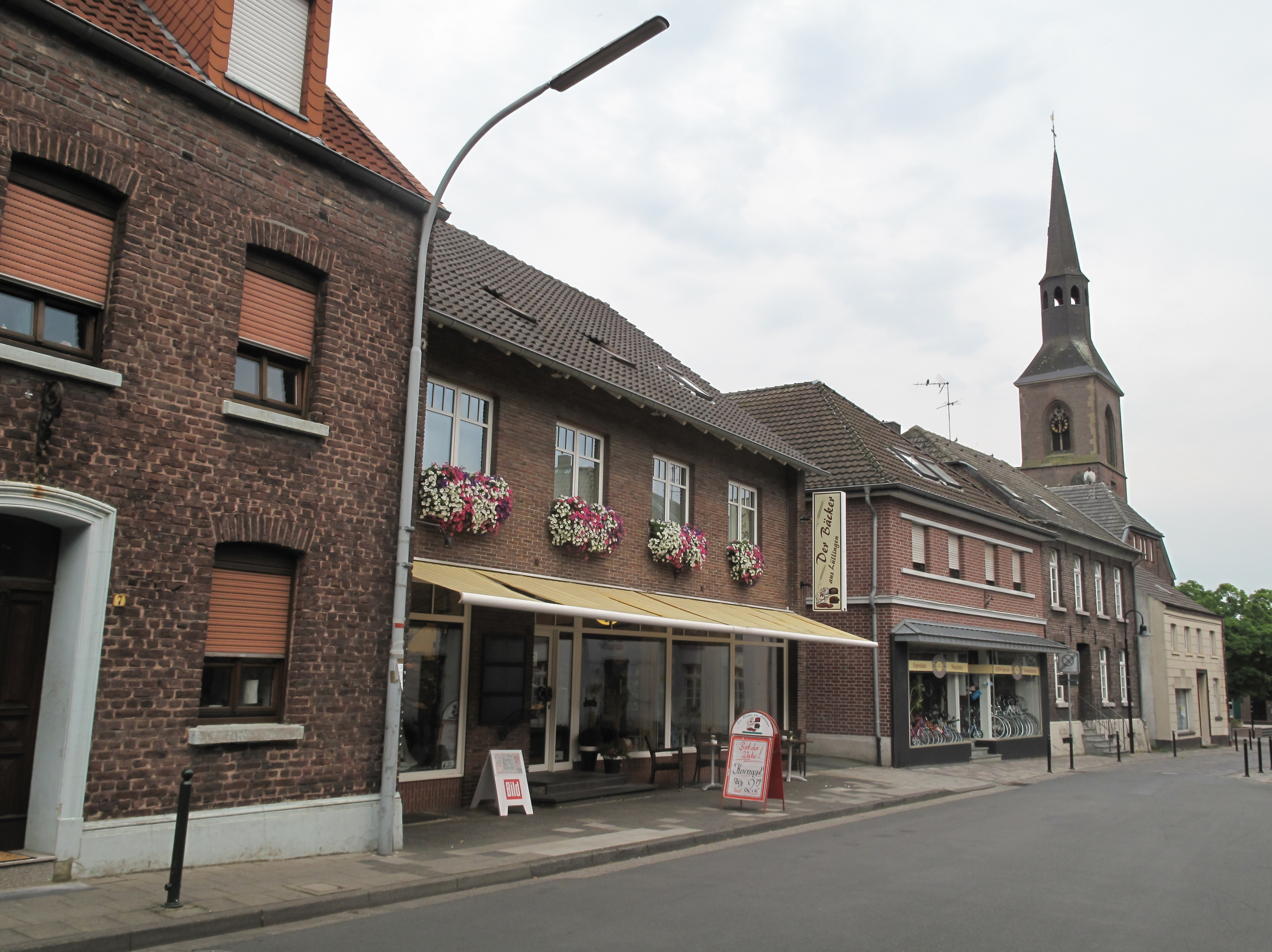
Wankum, church (Sankt Martin Kirche) in the street
