= Schwalmtal, North Rhine-Westphalia =

Schwalmtal
- Municipality
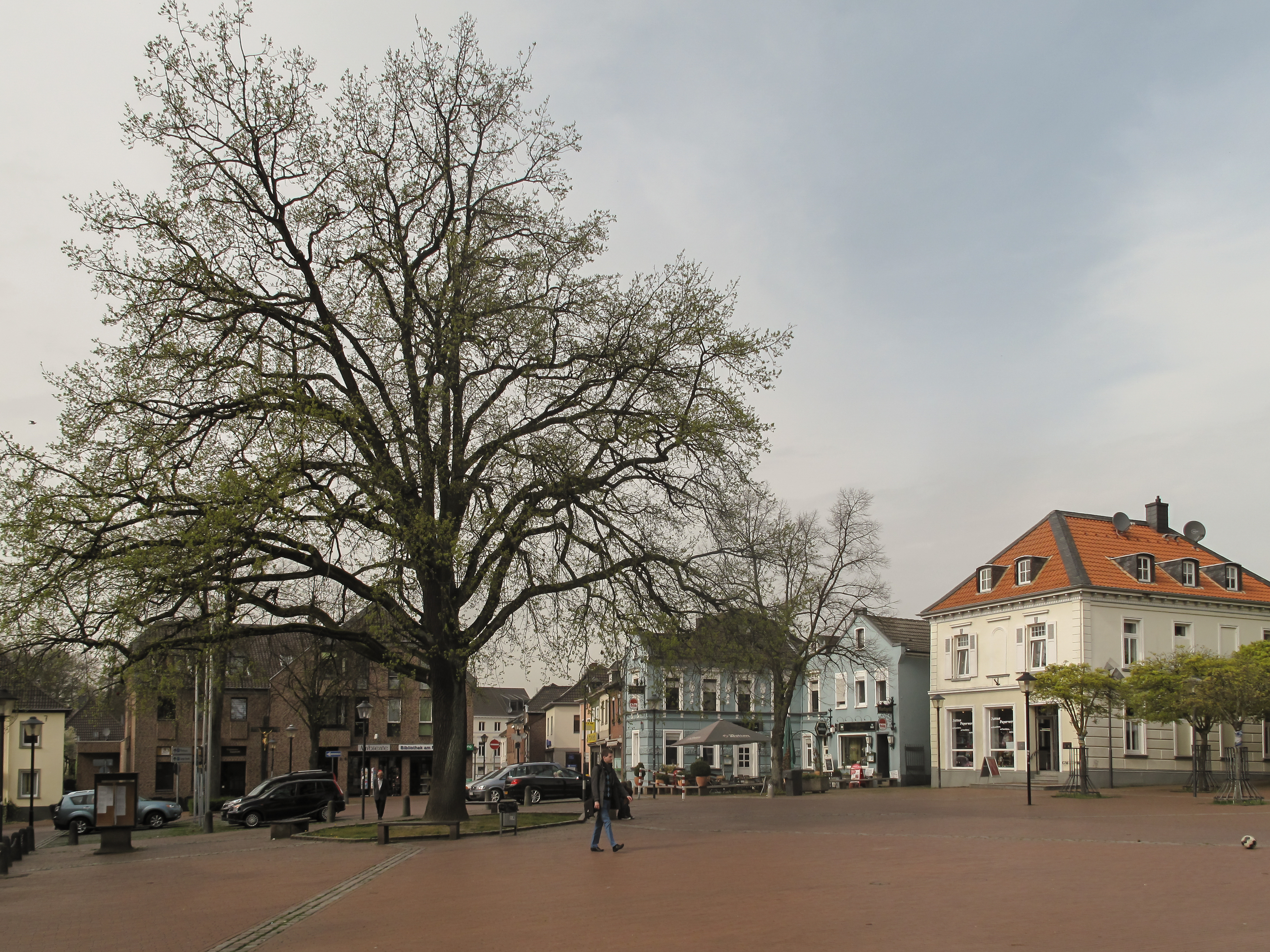

- Coat of arms

- Location of Schwalmtal within Viersen district
- Interactive map of Schwalmtal
- Location within Germany Location within North Rhine-Westphalia
- Coordinates: 51°13′21″N 6°15′45″E
- Country: Germany
- State: North Rhine-Westphalia
- Admin. region: Düsseldorf
- District: Viersen
- Subdivisions: 2

Government
  - Mayor (2020–25): Andreas Gisbertz (CDU)

Area
  - Total: 48.11 km^{2} (18.58 sq mi)
- Elevation: 60 m (200 ft)

Population (2025-12-31)
  - Total: 18,833
  - Density: 391.5/km^{2} (1,014/sq mi)
- Time zone: UTC+01:00 (CET)
  - Summer (DST): UTC+02:00 (CEST)
- Postal codes: 41366
- Dialling codes: 0 21 63
- Vehicle registration: VIE
- Website: www.schwalmtal.de

Schwalmtal (German pronunciation: [ˈʃvalmˌtaːl], lit. 'Schwalm Valley') is a municipality in the district of Viersen, in North Rhine-Westphalia, Germany. It is named after the river Schwalm, which flows through the area. Schwalmtal is situated approximately 12 km west of Mönchengladbach.

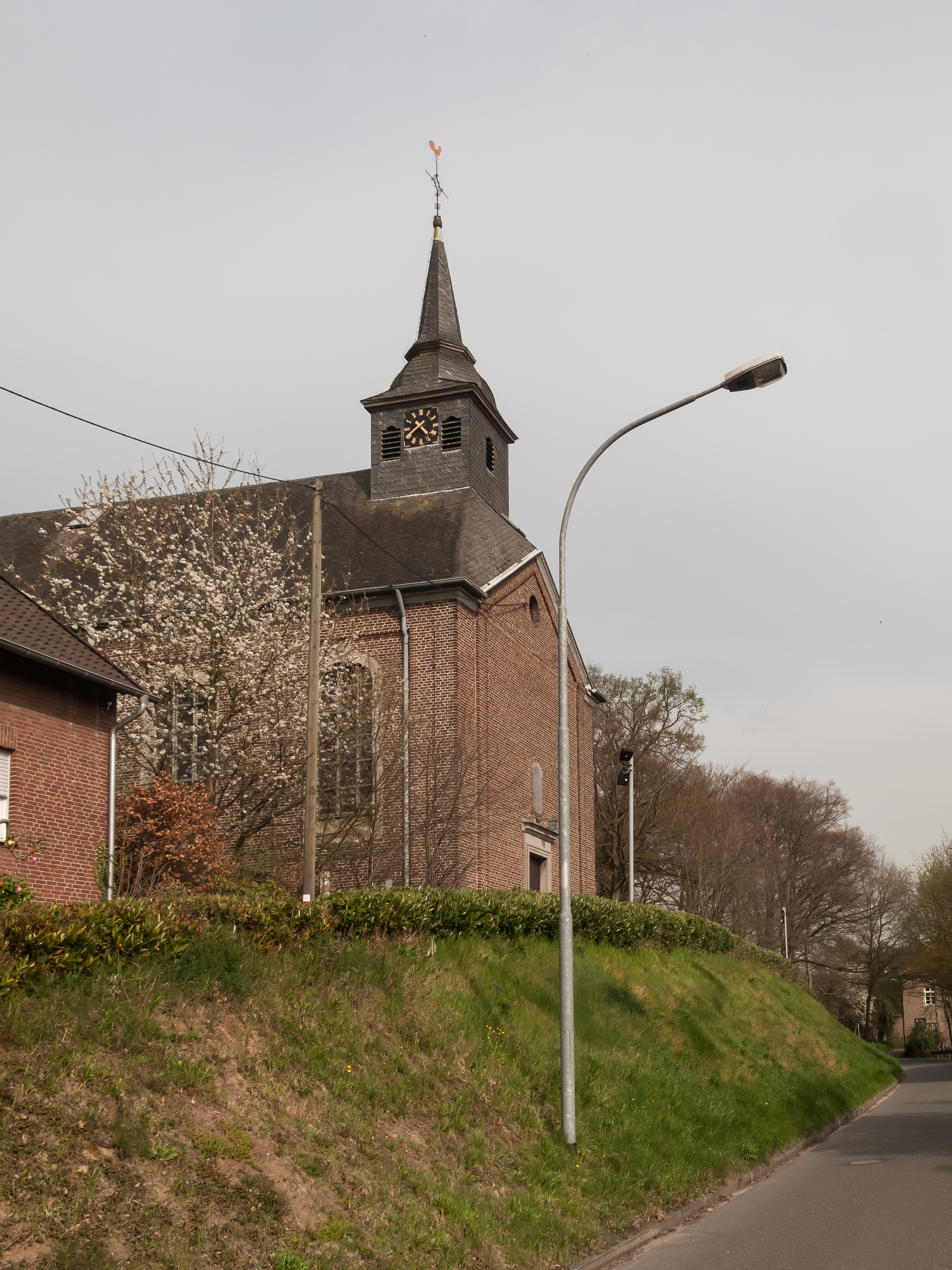
Lüttelforst's church; the Catholic Parish "Sankt Jakobus"

== Population ==
Historical population

Year	Pop.	±% p.a.
1965	13,776	—
1970	14,125	+0.50%
1975	14,397	+0.38%
1980	14,361	−0.05%
1985	14,779	+0.58%
1990	15,271	+0.66%
1995	17,116	+2.31%

Year	Pop.	±% p.a.
2000	19,177	+2.30%
2005	19,279	+0.11%
2010	19,012	−0.28%
2015	19,139	+0.13%
2020	19,012	−0.13%
2025	18,833	−0.19%

Source: Landesdatabank Nordrhein-Westfalen
