= Lower Rhine region =

Geographic region

Coordinates: 51°34′40″N 6°34′09″E

The Lower Rhine region in North Rhine-Westphalia in Germany

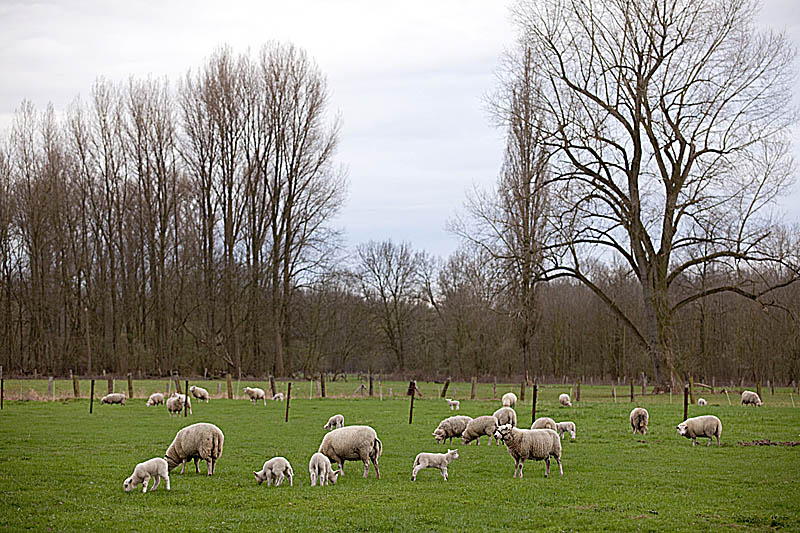
Niederrhein scenery

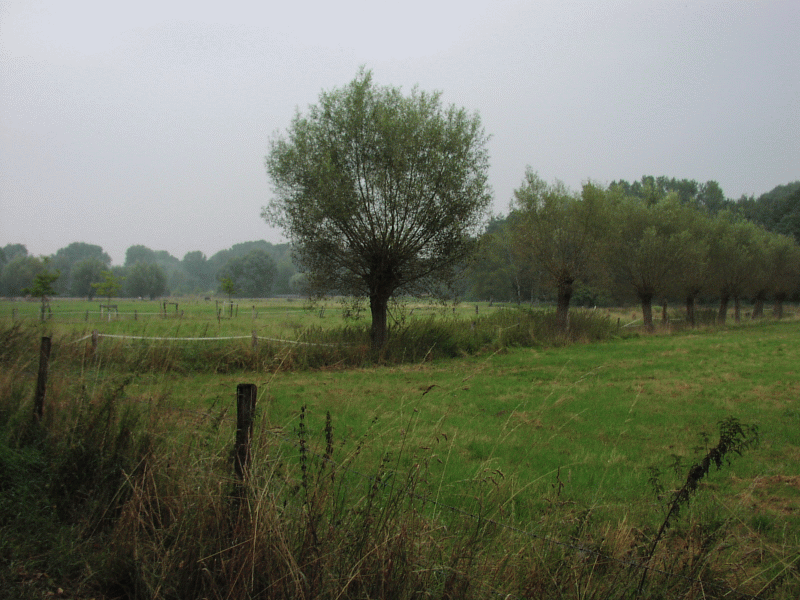
Niederrhein

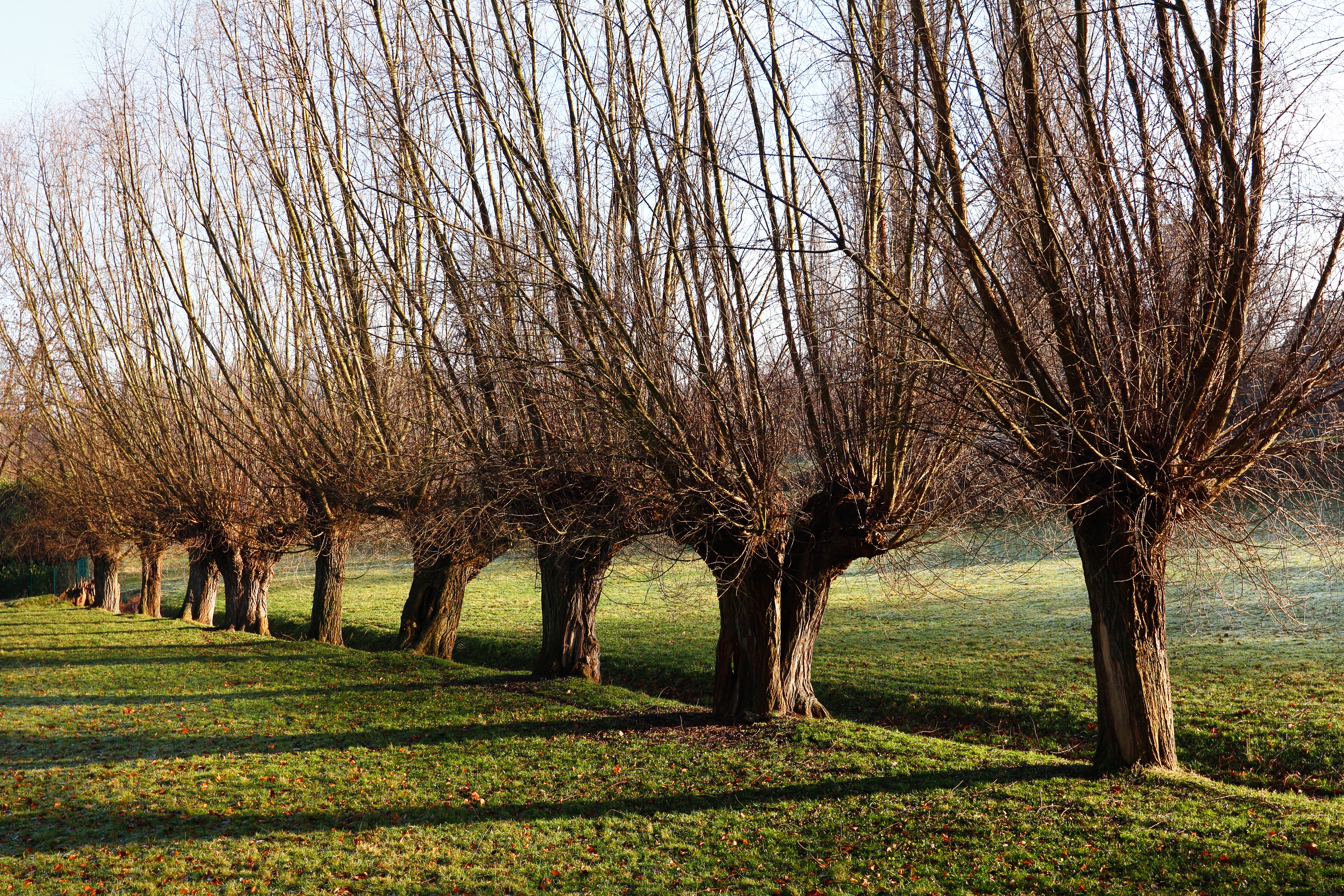
Pollard willows are characteristic trees of the lower Rhine region.

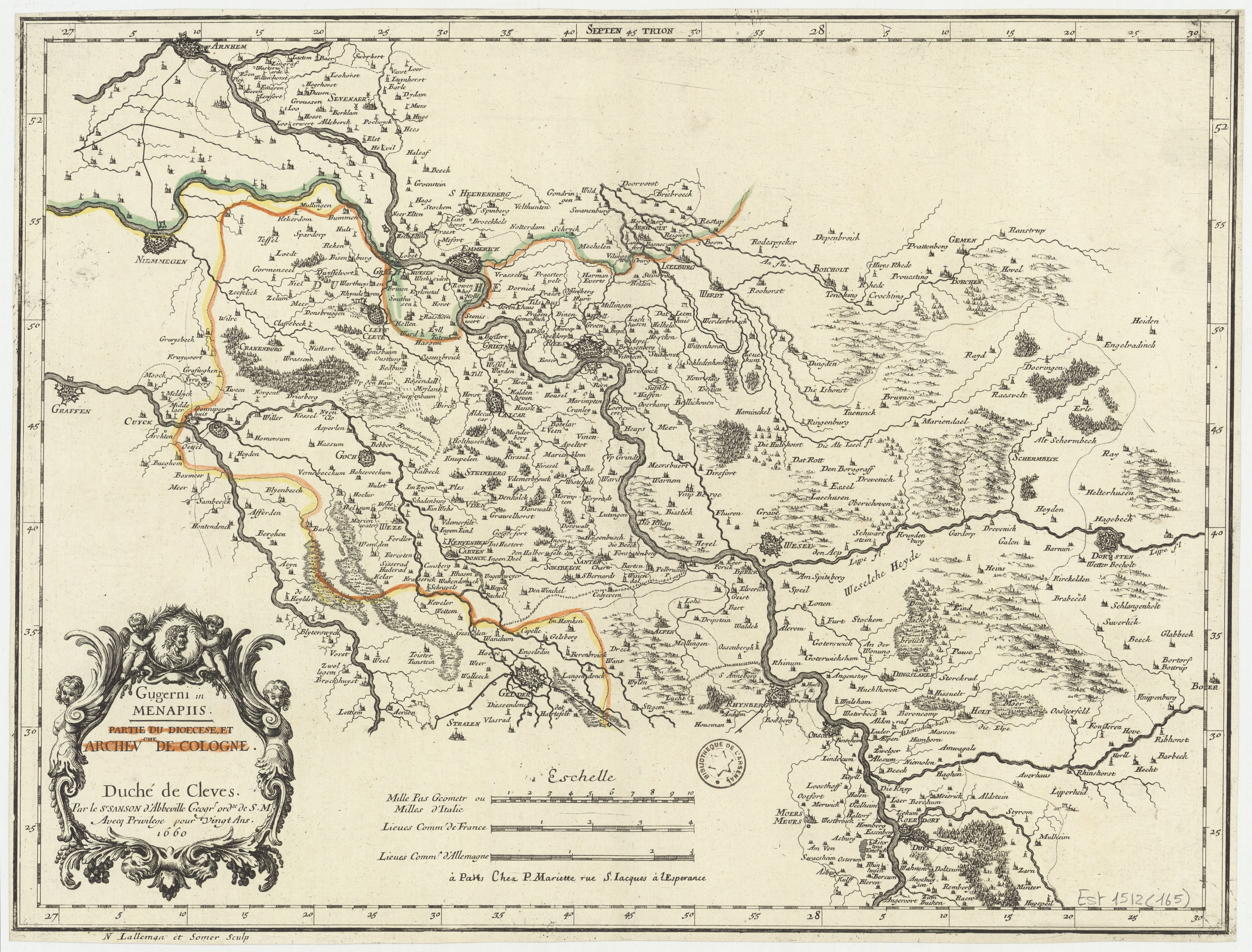
Historic map of the Duchy of Cleves, 1660

The Lower Rhine region or Niederrhein (German pronunciation: [ˈniːdɐˌʁaɪn]) is a region around the Lower Rhine section of the river Rhine in North Rhine-Westphalia, Germany, between approximately Oberhausen and Krefeld in the East and the Dutch border around Kleve in the West. As the region can be defined either geographically, linguistically, culturally, or by political, economic and traffic relations throughout the centuries, as well as by more recent political subdivisions, its precise borders are disputable and occasionally may be seen as extending beyond the Dutch border.

A cultural bond of the German Lower Rhine region is its Low Franconian language, specifically the Kleverlandish dialect (German: Kleverländisch, Dutch: Kleverlands), which includes the Dutch dialects just across the border. In the region's southeastern portion Bergish is spoken. Other typicalities of the area include the predominantly Catholic background as well as the Rhenish Carnival tradition.

The area basically covers the districts of Kleve, Wesel, Viersen and Neuss as well as the independent cities of Duisburg, Mönchengladbach and Krefeld. While disputable, Oberhausen and Düsseldorf may also be seen as part of the Lower Rhine region.

The Lower Rhine region's landscape is mostly flat green grassland with wide views of the horizon. Sights include the historic town centers of Kleve and Xanten, as well as Xanten's Roman archeological museum, the castle "Schloss Moyland" in Bedburg-Hau or the Catholic pilgrimage town of Kevelaer.

== See also ==
- Regierungsbezirk Düsseldorf Government region
- Weeze Airport
