= Viersen (district) =

Coordinates: 51.27°N 6.4°E

- District
- Flag Coat of arms
- Country: Germany
- State: North Rhine-Westphalia
- Adm. region: Düsseldorf
- Capital: Viersen

Government
  - District admin.: Andreas Coenen (CDU)

Area
  - Total: 563.29 km^{2} (217.49 sq mi)

Population (31 December 2024)
  - Total: 297,857
  - Density: 528.78/km^{2} (1,369.5/sq mi)
- Time zone: UTC+01:00 (CET)
  - Summer (DST): UTC+02:00 (CEST)
- Vehicle registration: VIE, KK
- Website: www.kreis-viersen.de

Viersen (German pronunciation: [ˈfiːɐ̯zn̩]) is a Kreis (district) in the west of North Rhine-Westphalia, Germany. Neighboring districts are Cleves, Wesel, district-free Krefeld, Neuss, district-free Mönchengladbach, Heinsberg and the Dutch province of Limburg.

== History ==
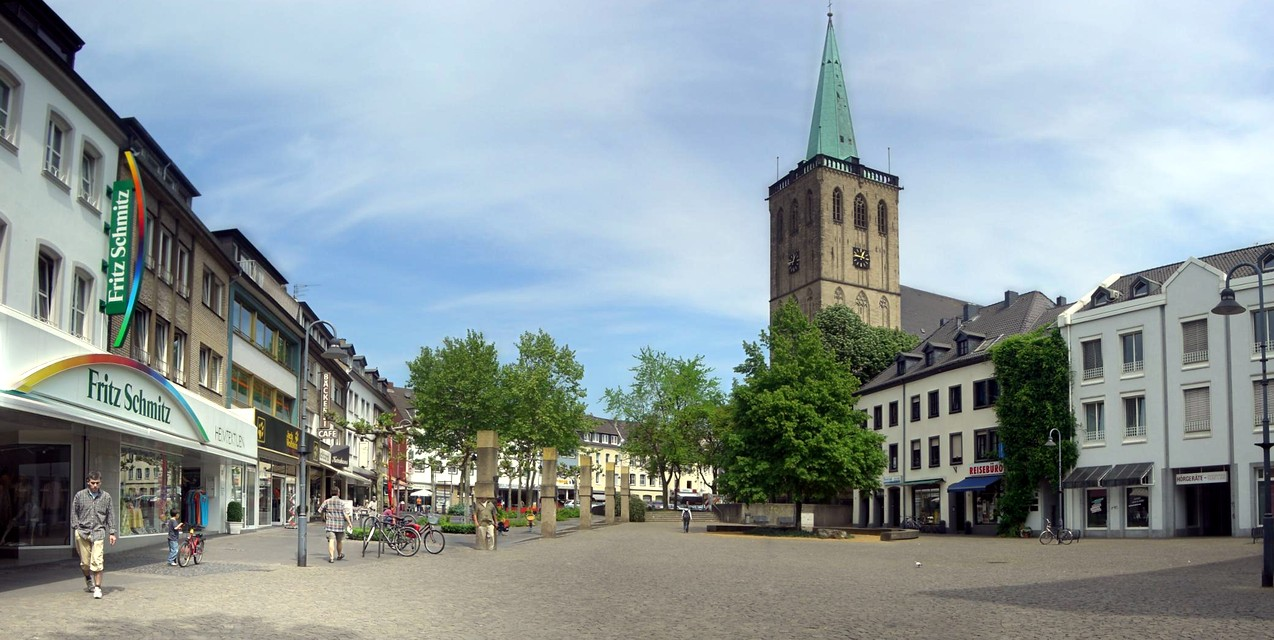
Panoramic view of the Remigius square in Viersen.

In 1816, the new Prussian government created the district of Kempen. Originally belonging to the Regierungsbezirk Kleve which was dissolved in 1822, Kempen has since then belonged to Düsseldorf. In 1929 the district was enlarged significantly and renamed Kempen-Krefeld.

In 1975 the district again changed its borders and was renamed Viersen even though Kempen remained the capital. Viersen city replaced Kempen as the capital in 1984.

== Twin Cities ==
The district Viersen has been twinned with Cambridgeshire in the United Kingdom since 1983.

== Geography ==
The district is located in the lowlands between the rivers Rhine and Meuse. The highest elevation is at Süchtelner Höhen with 90.7 m (298 ft), whereas the lowest is at Pielbruch with 28.6 m (94 ft).

== Coat of arms ==
The top of the coat of arms shows the black cross of the Cologne bishops, as the district used to belong to the clerical state Cologne. The golden lion on blue ground is the symbol of the duchy of Guelders; the black lion on golden ground the symbol of the duchy of Jülich.

== Cities and municipalities ==
Clickable map of towns and municipalities in the district

district-depending municipalities
- Brüggen

16.211 inhabitants

- Grefrath

15.929 inhabitants

- Niederkrüchten

15.457 inhabitants

- Schwalmtal

19.279 inhabitants

medium district-depending cities
- Kempen

36.323 inhabitants

- Nettetal

42.434 inhabitants

- Tönisvorst

30.238 inhabitants

- Willich

51.939 inhabitants

large district-depending cities
- Viersen

76.330 inhabitants

based on data from: 31 December 2005
