= Helmut Linssen =

German politician

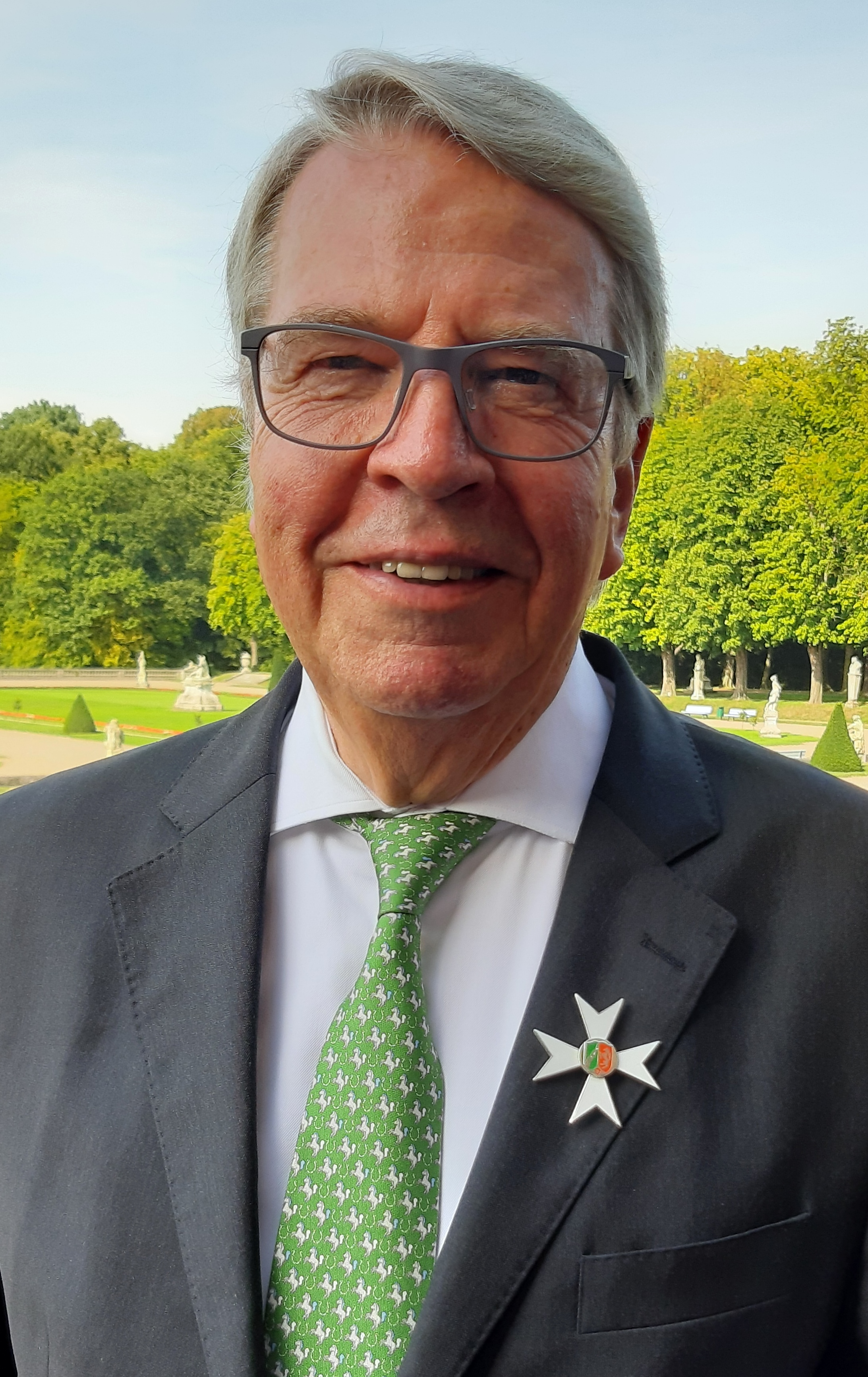
Helmut Linssen (2019) with the Order of Merit of the State of North Rhine-Westphalia

Helmut Linssen (born June 21, 1942, in Krefeld) is a German politician (CDU). From June 24, 2005, to July 15, 2010, he was finance minister of the state of North Rhine-Westphalia, immediately afterwards federal treasurer of the CDU. On February 6, 2014, following increasing pressure after his tax haven deals became known, he announced his retirement.

== Education and career ==
Linssen comes from a Catholic conservative family in the Lower Rhine region. After graduating from the humanistic high school of the district and the city of Geldern in 1961, he completed a commercial apprenticeship in wholesale and foreign trade as well as in import and export in Hamburg. Linssen then studied economics and social sciences at the University of Hamburg and LMU Munich. He completed his studies in 1968 with a degree in business administration and was awarded a Dr. re. pole. Ph.D. During his studies and afterwards he worked as a self-employed businessman in the medium-sized family business, Heinrich Linssen KG in Geldern, an agricultural wholesale business founded by his father in 1925, which in 1994 became BSL – Biesterfeld Scheibler Linssen GmbH & Co. KG in Hamburg merged.

== Political career ==
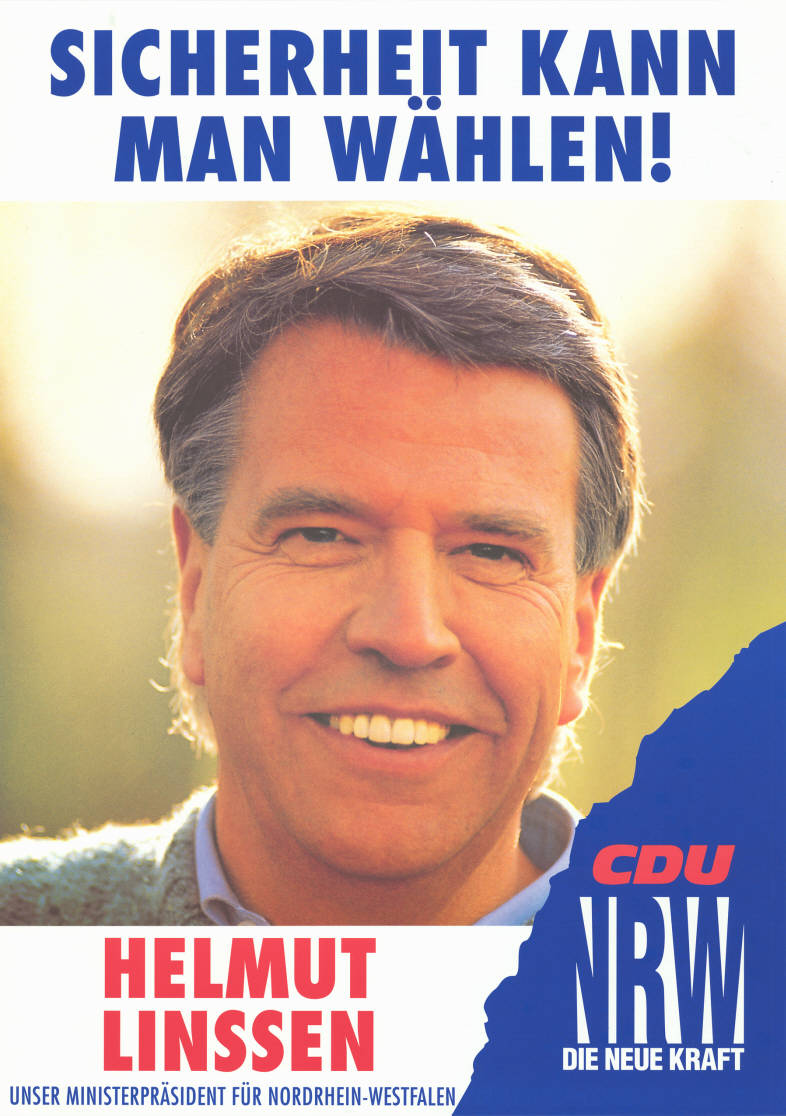
Election poster with Linssen as the top candidate for the state elections in North Rhine-Westphalia in 1995

Linssen joined the CDU in 1972 and was on the council of his hometown of Geldern (Lower Rhine) from 1975 to 1980. In 1980, he entered the North Rhine-Westphalian state parliament for the first time. He represented the Kleve I constituency, which today includes the municipalities of Geldern, Issum, Kalkar, Kerken, Kevelaer, Rheurdt, Straelen, Uedem, Wachtendonk and Weeze. From 1987 to 1991 he was the general secretary of the CDU North Rhine-Westphalia and from 1990 to 1999 chairman of the parliamentary group the CDU parliamentary group. As such, he also served as leader of the opposition in the state parliament. In the 1995 state elections, he ran as the top candidate against the then Prime Minister of North Rhine-Westphalia and later Federal President Johannes Rau, but was unable to assert himself against him.

In January 1999, Linssen applied to be the state chairman of the CDU in North Rhine-Westphalia. The post had become vacant due to Norbert Blüm's resignation. In addition to Linssen, the former State Secretary in the Federal Building Ministry, Christa Thoben, and the former Federal Minister Jürgen Rüttgers applied for the chair. The latter narrowly prevailed against Linssen. From 2000 to 2005 he was 1st Vice President of the State Parliament of North Rhine-Westphalia and Chairman of the Committee on Economics, SMEs and Technology.
