= Schaephuysen =

- Village / locality of Rheurdt
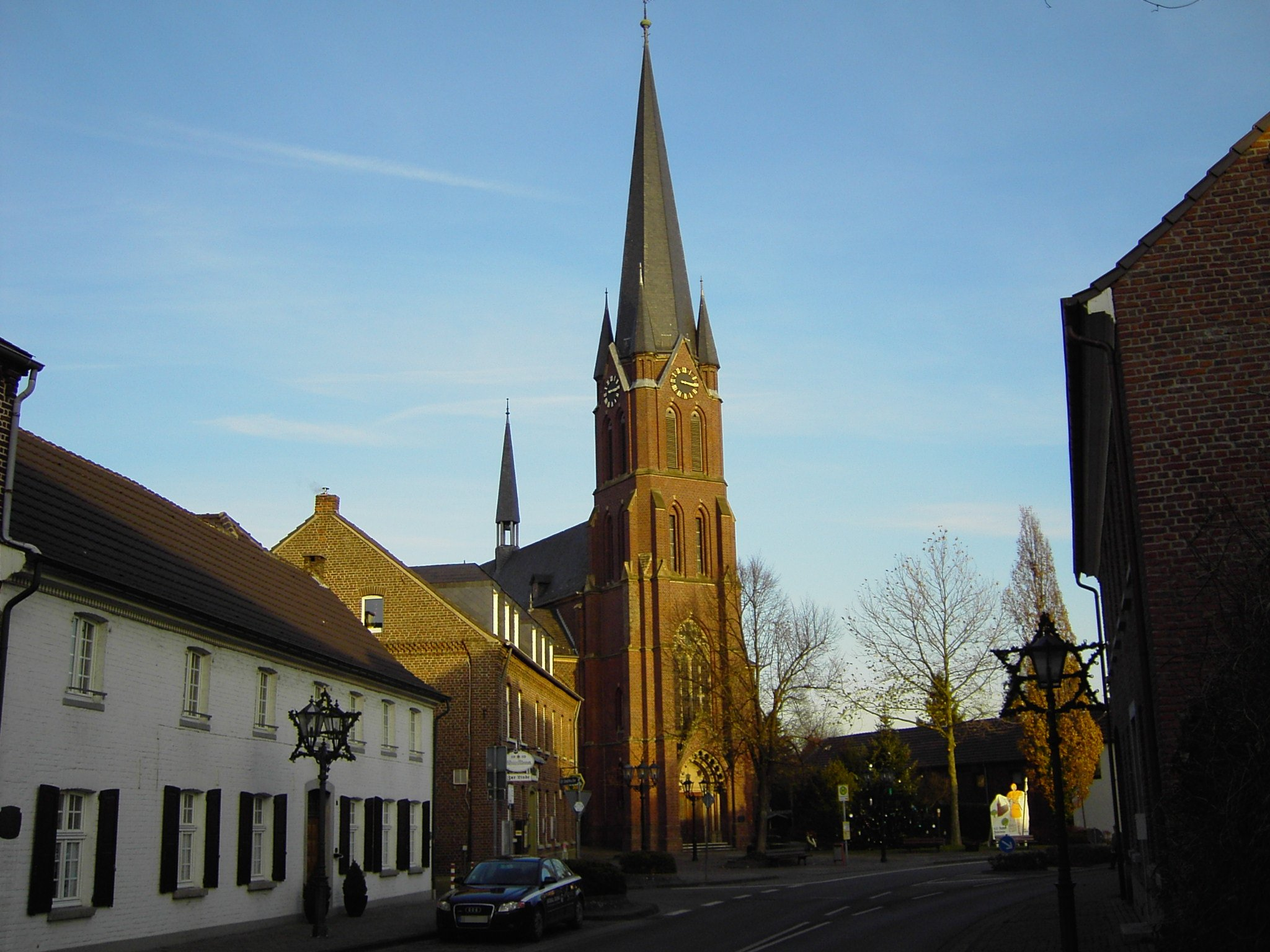
- Catholic parish church of St. Hubertus

- Coat of arms
- Interactive map of Schaephuysen
- Location within Germany Location within North Rhine-Westphalia
- Coordinates: 51°26′32″N 6°29′02″E
- Country: Germany
- State: North Rhine-Westphalia
- Admin. region: Düsseldorf
- District: Kleve
- Town: Rheurdt
- Time zone: UTC+01:00 (CET)
  - Summer (DST): UTC+02:00 (CEST)
- Postal codes: 02845

Schaephuysen is a village in the municipality Rheurdt in the district Kleve in North Rhine-Westphalia, Germany.

The village is part of the Niederrhein region and includes the hamlets Neufeld, Saelhuysen-Finkenberg, and Lind.

The Catholic parish church of St. Hubertus, built in 1896 in Neo-Gothic style, is one of the main landmarks of the village.

== History ==
Schaephuysen originally belonged to the Duchy of Guelders until 1713, before passing to Prussia. Between 1798 and 1814 it was under French administration, during which it formed a mairie in the canton of Moers in the Arrondissement of Krefeld within the Roer Department.

After the Congress of Vienna in 1814, the region became part of Prussia again. Schaephuysen was assigned to the district of Rheinberg in 1816, to the district of Geldern in 1823, and later to the district of Moers in 1857. The French mairie was replaced by a Prussian Bürgermeisterei.

On 1 July 1969, Schaephuysen was incorporated into the municipality of Rheurdt.

== Notable people ==
- Viktor Josef Dammertz (1929–2020), Benedictine abbot and Bishop of Augsburg

== Gallery ==
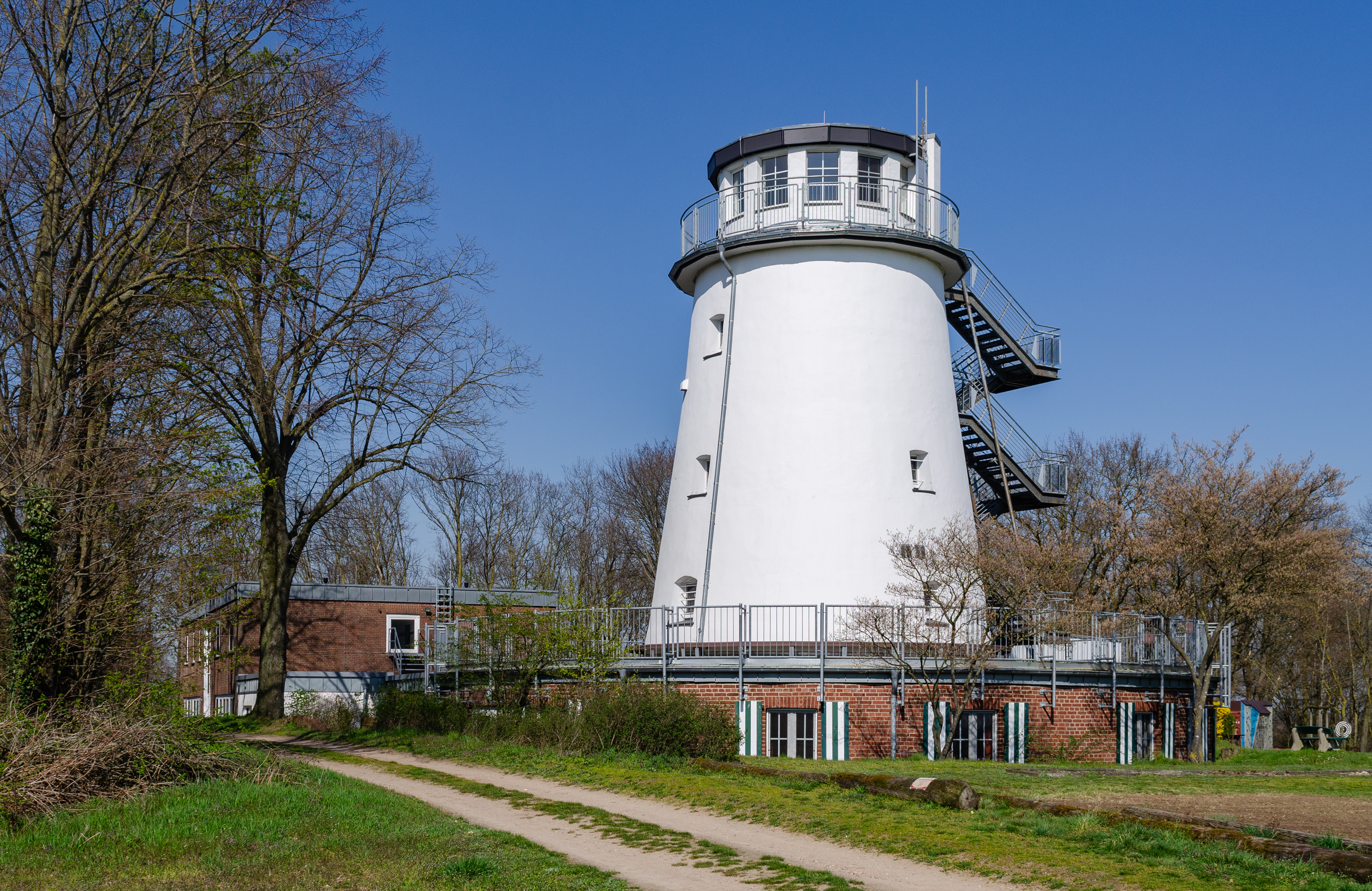
Former Windmill, now the St. Michaelturm Youth Education Center

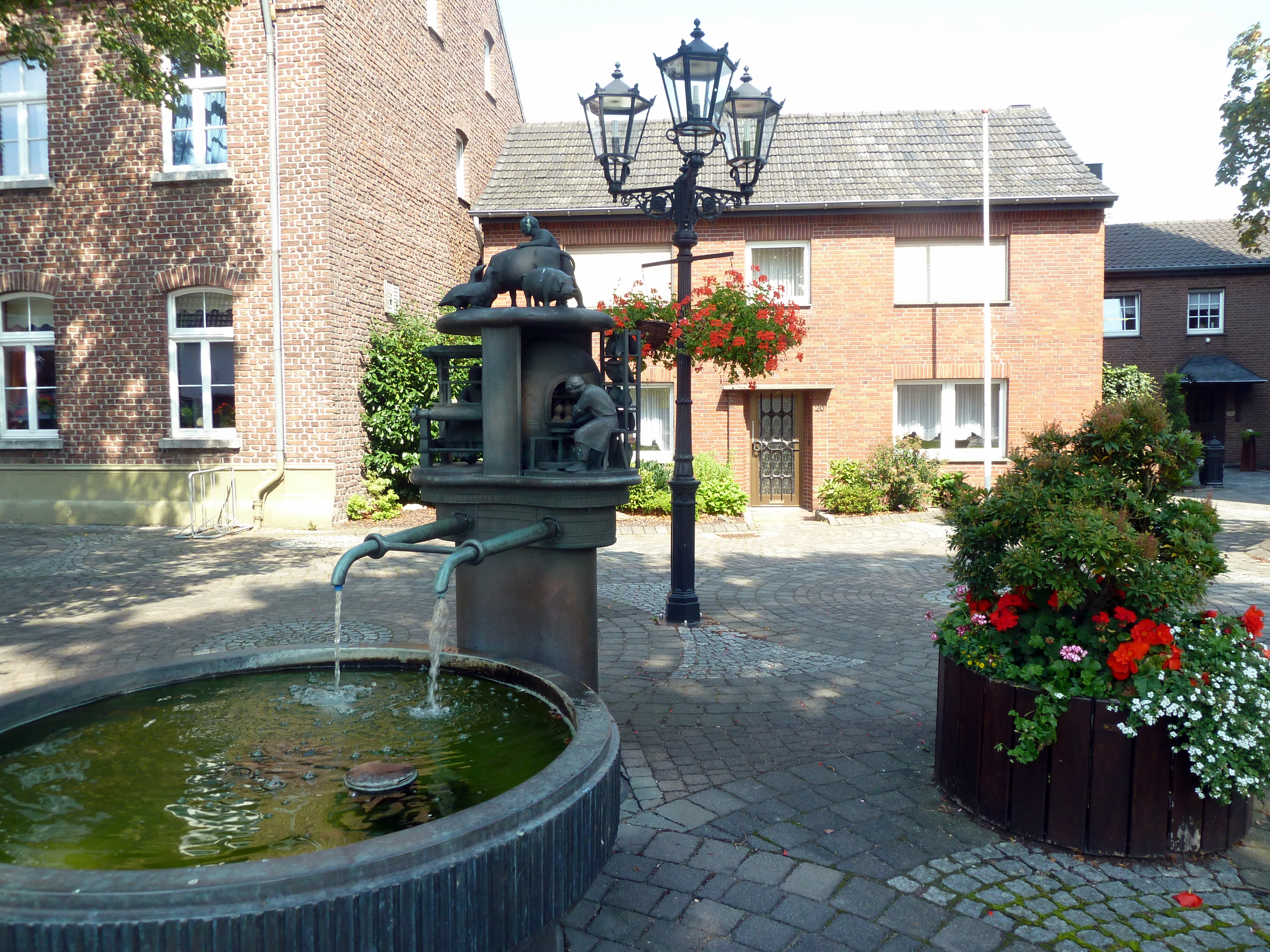
Fountain

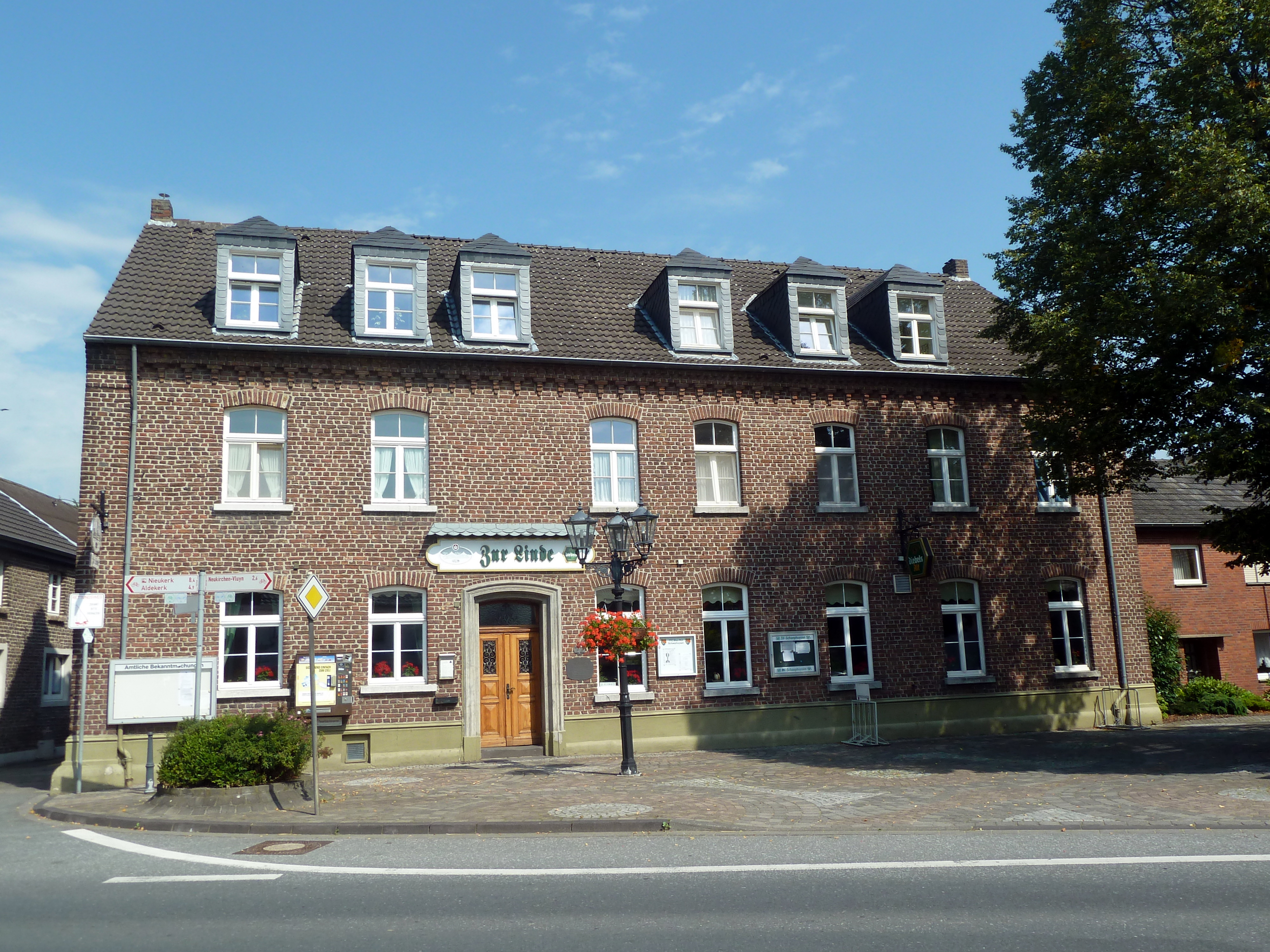
Restaurant

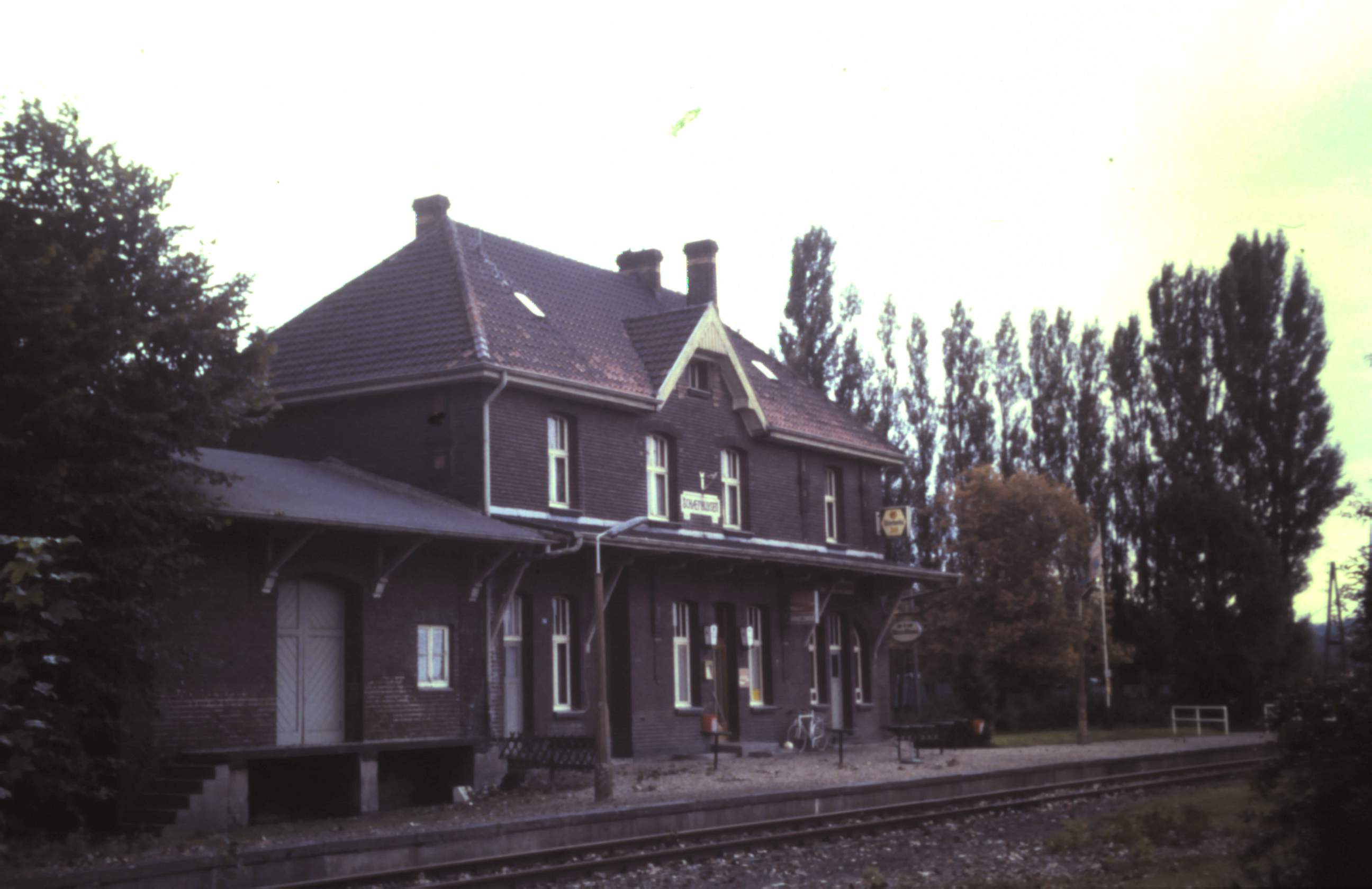
Train station 1986

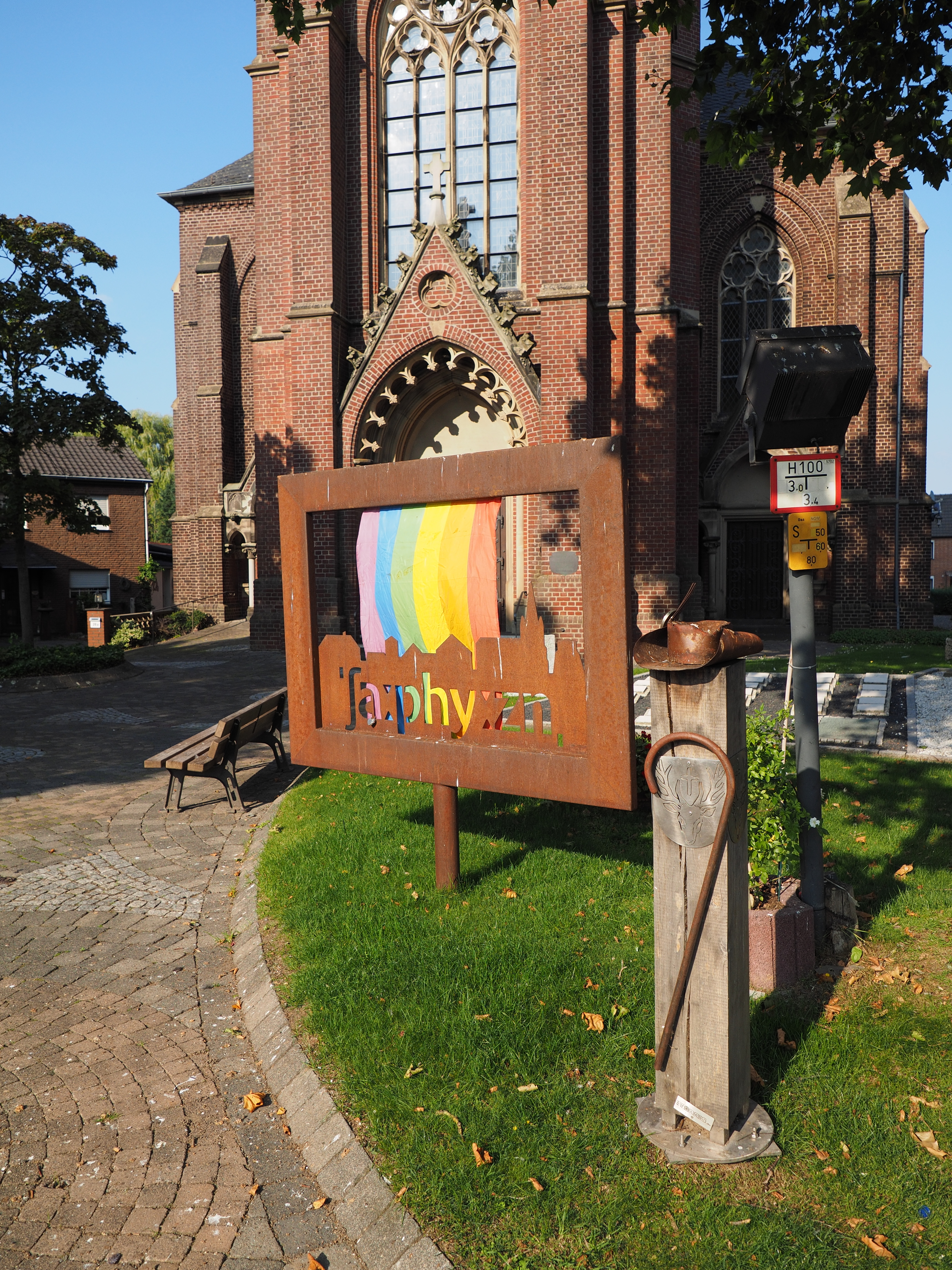
St. Hubertus
