= Pinkus Müller =

Brewery in Münster, Germany

Brauerei Pinkus Müller
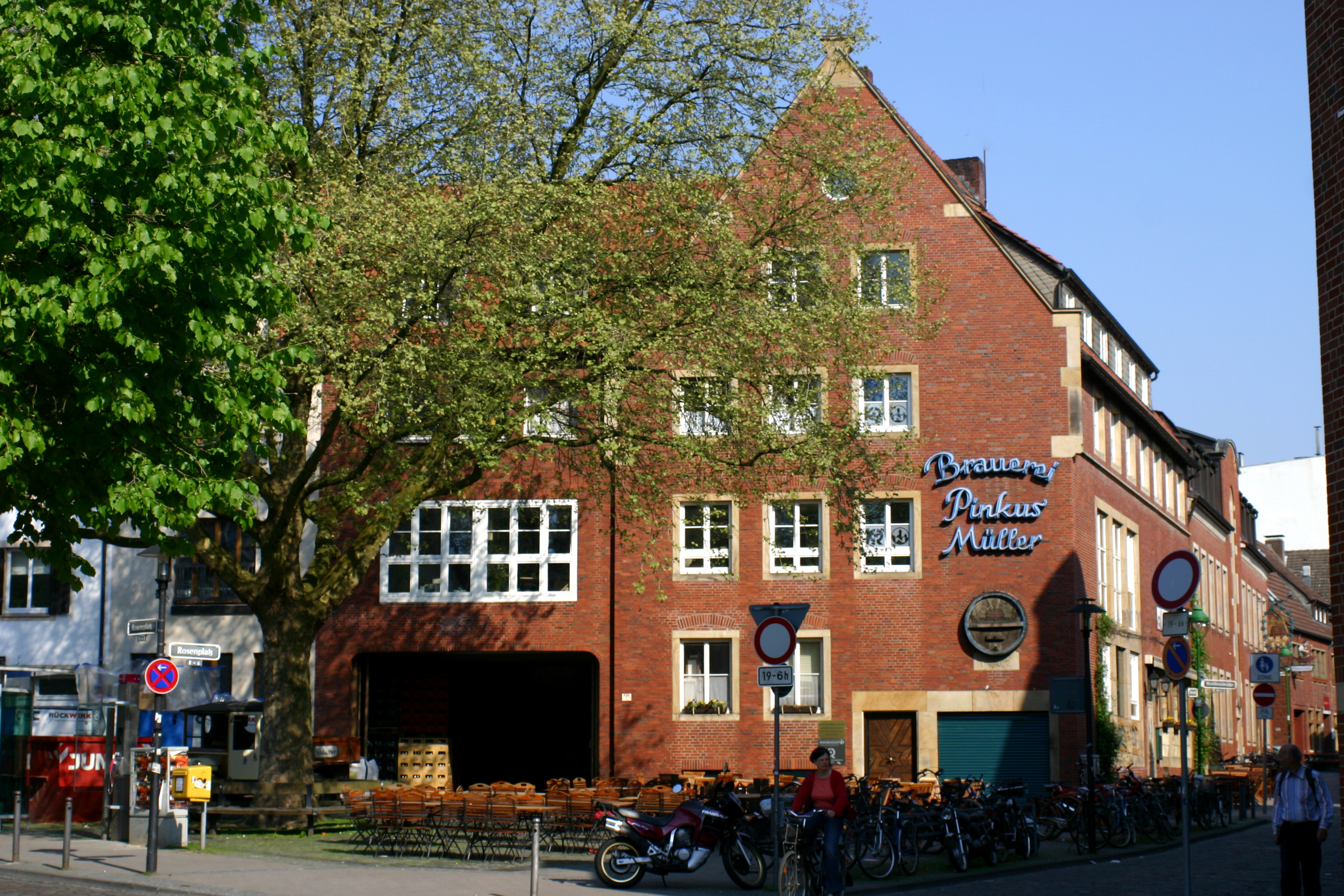
- Interactive map of Brauerei Pinkus Müller
- Type: GmbH & Co. KG
- Location: Münster, Germany
- Coordinates: 51°57′56″N 7°37′18″E
- Opened: 1816
- Annual production volume: 20,000 hectolitres (17,000 US bbl)
- Website: pinkus.de

Pinkus Müller is a German brewery based in the Northern Germany town of Münster. The Pinkus-Müller brewery traces its origins to the arrival of Johannes Müller (1792–1870) in Münster from his hometown of Hildebrandshausen in 1816. After marrying Friederika Cramer they opened a bakery and a brewery. In 1866 the bakery was closed and a malthouse was opened instead. In the following hundred years the brewery and the pub were expanded. In 1993 a bottling plant was opened in the neighbouring city of Laer. It is the only brewery left in Münster from the original 150 breweries.

== Products ==
- Pinkus Alt
- Pinkus Special
- Hefeweizen
- Pinkus Pils
- Pinkus Leicht
- Pinkus Jubilate
- Müllers Malz
- Pinkus Honig Malz
- Pinkus Alkoholfrei
- Demeter Lagerbier
