= Altbier =

Style of beer

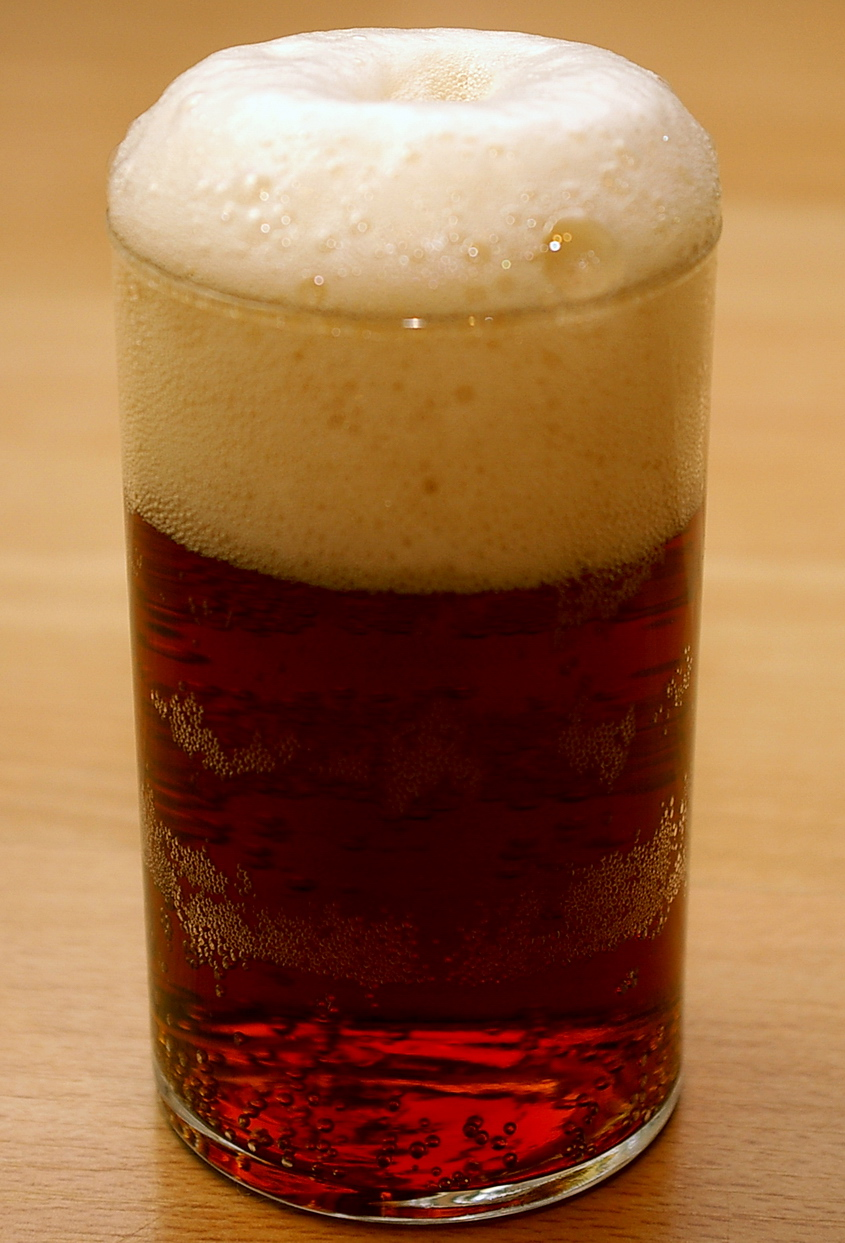
A Diebels Alt

Altbier (German: [ˈaltˌbiːɐ̯], lit. 'old beer') is a style of beer brewed in the Rhineland, especially around the city of Düsseldorf, Germany. It is a copper coloured beer whose name comes from it being top-fermented, an older method than the bottom fermentation of lagers.

== Characteristics ==
Altbier is usually a dark, copper colour. It is fermented at a moderate temperature using a top-fermenting yeast—which gives its flavour some fruitiness. Because Altbier is then matured at a cooler temperature, its flavour is more akin to lager beer styles than is the norm for top-fermented beers (such as British pale ale). It generally has an ABV between 4.3% and 5.5%.

== Altbier in Germany ==
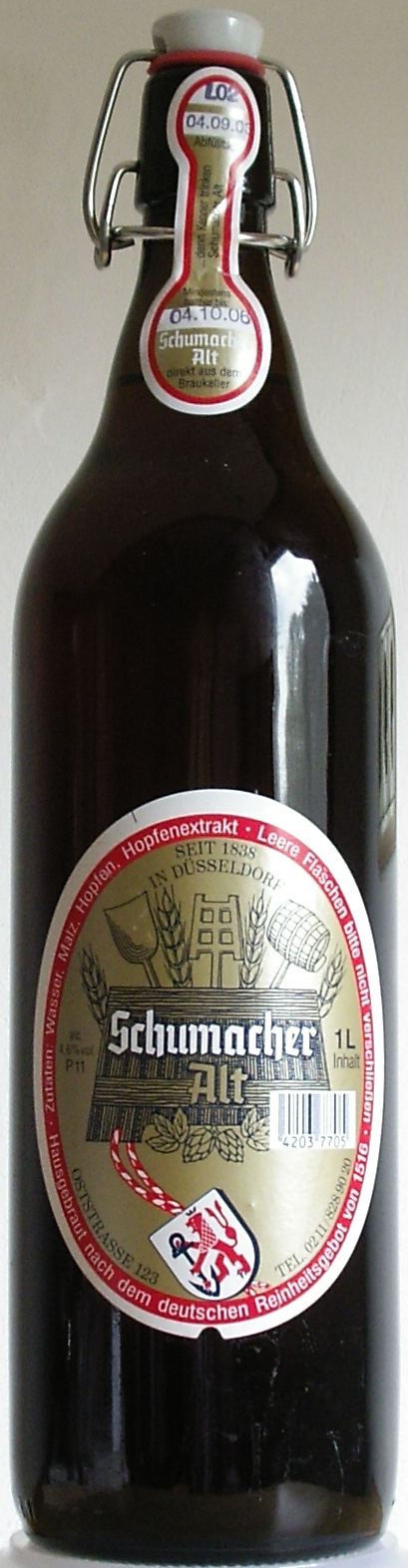
Schumacher Alt

The first producer to use the name Altbier—to contrast its top-fermenting beer with the bottom-fermenting kinds—was the Schumacher brewery of Düsseldorf, that opened in 1838. Mass-market brewers of Altbier include Diebels and the Radeberger Gruppe under the brands Schlösser Alt and Hansa Alt. These are complemented by small breweries in Düsseldorf and other nearby cities.

Some Altbier breweries have a tradition of producing a stronger version, called sticke alt, coming from a local dialect word meaning "secret". Originally made as a special reserve beer intended for the brewers' own consumption, today it is generally a seasonal or special occasion brew.

There exists a regional rivalry between the drinkers of Altbier in the Düsseldorf area and the drinkers of Kölsch beer in the Cologne (Köln) area.

== Production ==
A beer variety associated with the Lower Rhine region, Altbier is especially found in Düsseldorf, Krefeld, and Mönchengladbach.

=== Producers in Düsseldorf ===
There are seven bars in Düsseldorf which brew Altbier on the premises:

- Füchschen
- Kürzer
- Schumacher
- Schlüssel
- Uerige
- Alter Bahnhof (Gulasch Alt)
- Brauhaus Joh Albrecht (Johann Albrecht Alt)

Füchschen, Uerige, Schlüssel and Kürzer are all brewed and sold in the Altstadt (Old Town). Schumacher is between the Altstadt and the main train station (Hauptbahnhof), although it also has a pub in the Altstadt, Im Goldenen Kessel, across the street from Schlüssel.

Each brewpub produces a seasonal "Sticke" variant in small quantities, though the names vary: Schlüssel spells it "Stike", without the "c", while Schumacher calls its special beer "Latzenbier", meaning "slat beer", possibly because the kegs from which it was poured had been stored on raised shelves. Füchschen's seasonal is its Weihnachtsbier (Christmas beer), available in bottles starting mid-November, and served in the brewpub on Christmas Eve.

=== Producers outside Düsseldorf ===
Altbier brewed outside Düsseldorf includes that produced by the Diebels brewery in Issum, the Gleumes brewery in Krefeld, the Bolten brewery in Korschenbroich, the Warsteiner brewery in Warstein (that owns the brand "Frankenheim Alt", originally brewed in Düsseldorf), and the Fiege brewery in Bochum.

Altbier is somewhat similar to Cologne's native beer style Kölsch, being warm-fermented at a lower temperature than British ales, and Altbier proper is also brewed as "Ehrenfelder Alt", in Cologne's smallest brewery "Braustelle".

Pinkus Müller brewery in Münster produces an Altbier which is quite different to the Düsseldorf style, being pale and slightly tart.

=== Producers outside Germany ===
Altbier has been produced in the city of Venlo in the Netherlands since at least 1753. Venlo is on the border to Germany approximately 50 km (30 miles) from Düsseldorf. The beer was produced up until the Second World War, but then had a hiatus until its revival in 1983. It is produced by the Lindeboom brewery, who bought the recipe in 2001.

Altbier is brewed in small quantities in Austria, Switzerland, Hungary, Liechtenstein, the UK, the United States, Canada, Australia by Tooheys in Sydney New South Wales, New Zealand, Japan, South Africa, Norway, Brazil and Australia.

Versions of altbier are brewed in the United States, though not always to traditional recipes, with Widmer Brothers often considered the first American brewer to produce the style.

== See also ==
- List of beer styles
- German beer
