= Bolten-Brauerei =

German brewery

Privatbrauerei Bolten GmbH & Co. KG
- Type: GmbH & Co. KG
- Location: Korschenbroich, North Rhine-Westphalia, Germany Rheydter Strasse 138
- Coordinates: 51°11′0″N 6°29′57″E
- Opened: 1266
- Key people: Michael Hollmann (director)
- Annual production volume: 50,000 hectolitres (43,000 US bbl) in 2015
- Website: bolten-brauerei.de

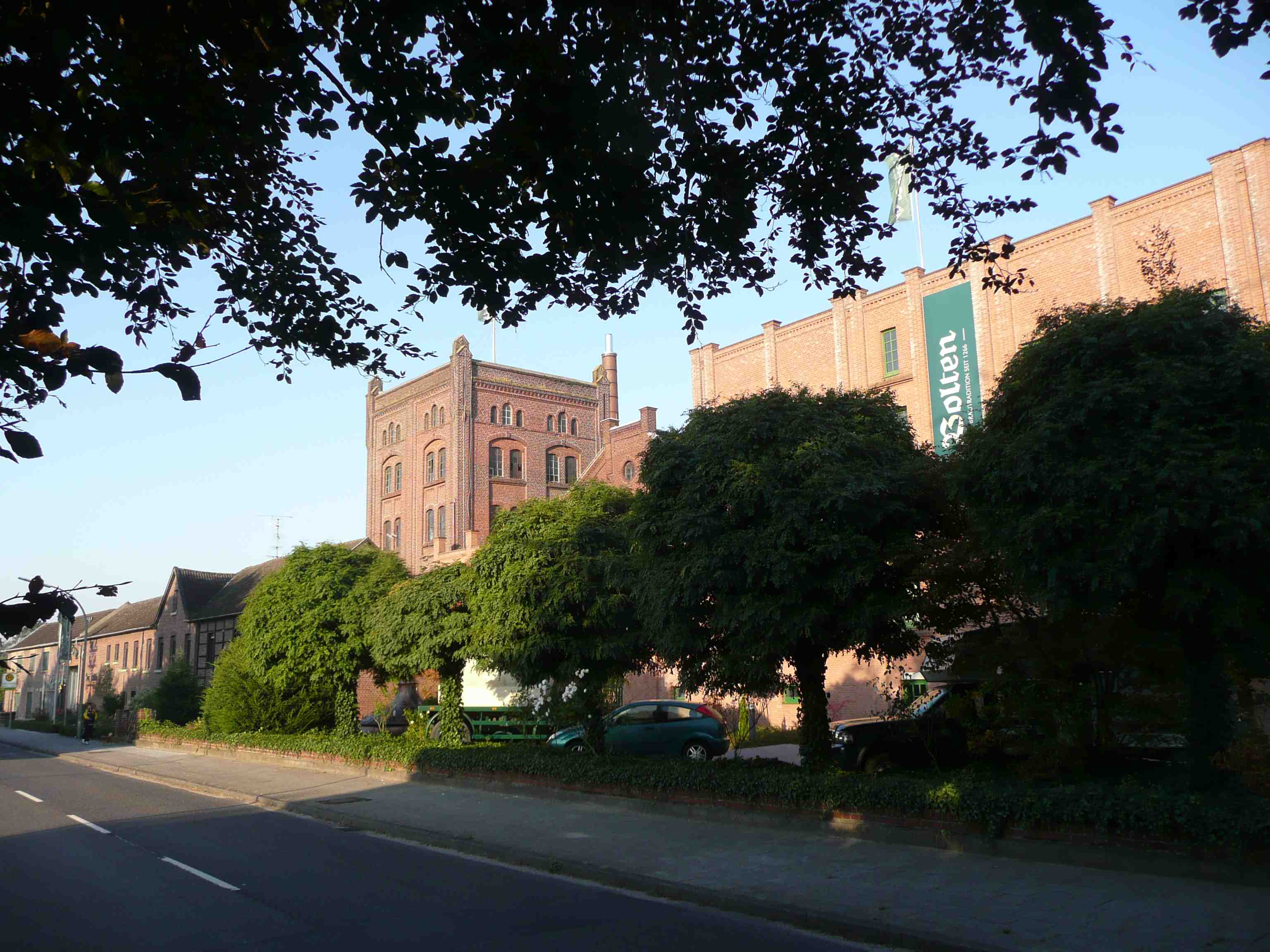
Historic buildings of Bolten Brauerei

Bolten-Brauerei is a brewery in North Rhine-Westphalia, Germany. It was founded in 1266 when the Lord of Myllendonk authorised the brewing of beer at the current site in Korschenbroich and claims to be the oldest altbier brewery in the world. In 2011 it produced about 50,000 hectoliters of beer.

== Products ==
As of 2019 the brewery produces two sorts of altbier named Alt and Ur-Alt (an unfiltered variant), a wheat beer Ur-Weizen, two bottom-fermentation, less hopped light beers Helles and Landbier (unfiltered), a heavily hopped pilsener named Natur Pilsener and a seasonal special dark beer Nikolaus Spezial during Advent, as well as Malz, a sweet, non-alcoholic malt beer.

== See also ==
- List of oldest companies
