= Diebels =

Trademarked beer label

Diebels Brewery Brauerei Diebels
- Type: GmbH & Co. KG
- Location: Issum, Germany
- Opened: 1878
- Key people: Ulrich Balzer; Jens Hösel; Frank Steffens; Rüdiger Röhnisch
- Annual production volume: 1,006,000 hectolitres (857,000 US bbl) in 2005
- Revenue: 42 million euros
- Employees: 234 (2008)

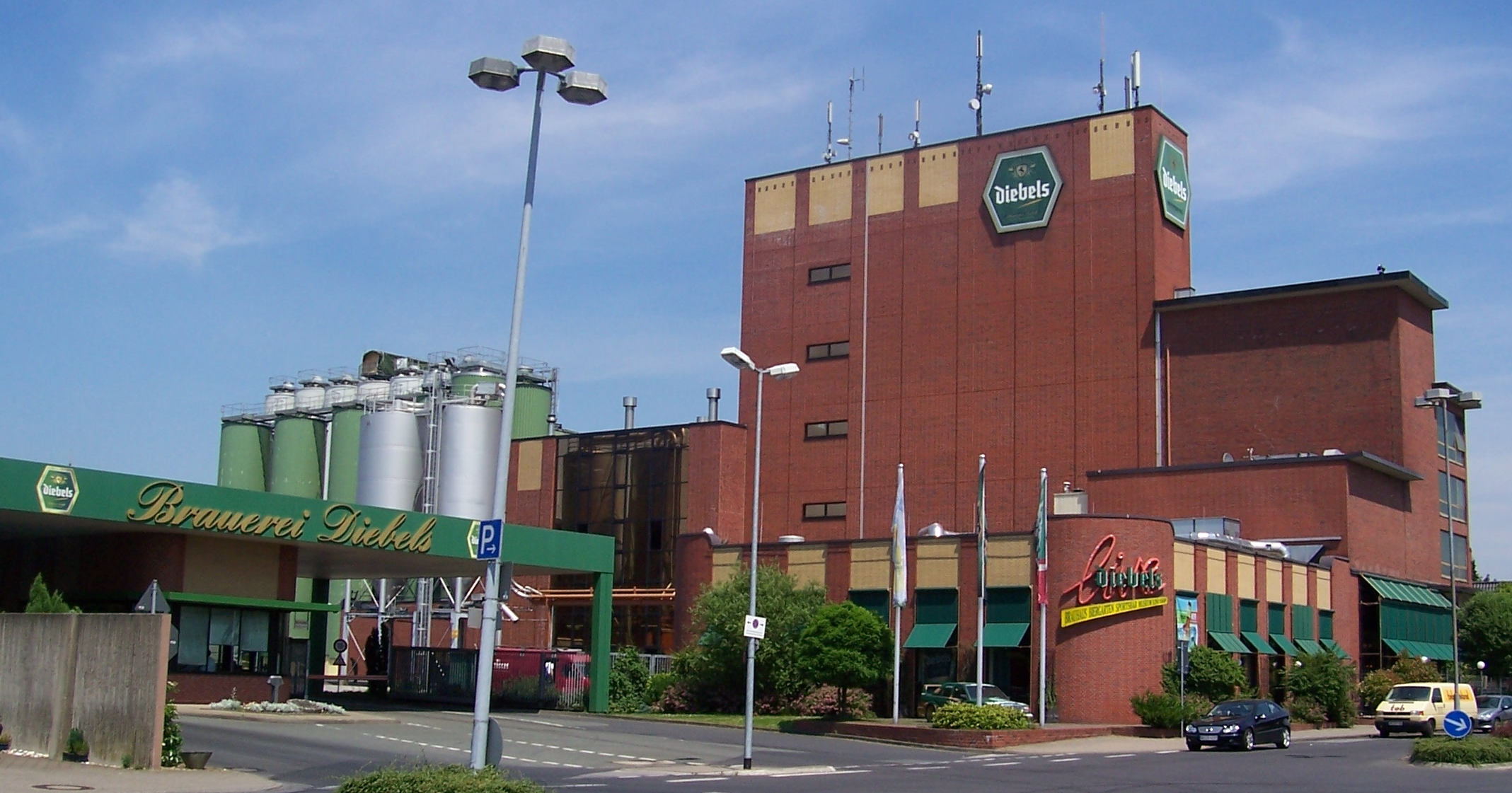
Diebels Brewery in Issum

Brauerei Diebels is a firm based in Issum on the Lower Rhine that manufactures various beer products. The company was a prominent shirt sponsor of the German Bundesliga clubs MSV Duisburg between 1977 and 1981 and Borussia Mönchengladbach during the 1990s.

In 2005 the company produced 1,006,000 hectoliters of beer. Compared to 2004, production fell by two percent, compared to 2001 by around 33 percent. With the introduction of a Diebels Pils in 2005, production could only be stabilized for a short time. In addition to the Diebels brands, various products from the Beck & Co. brewery, which also belongs to the Anheuser-Busch Inbev Group, are bottled in Issum. In 2016 only 350,000 hl of beer were produced.

Diebels was shirt sponsor of Borussia Mönchengladbach from 1994 to 1997 and of Fortuna Düsseldorf from 1993 to 1998. In addition, Diebels drove in the 1990s at the German Touring Car Championship with the Dane Kurt Thiim and Jörg van Ommen from Moers.

== History ==
The brewery was founded in 1878 by Krefelder Braumeister Josef Diebels in Issum. After 20 years, the brewery reached an annual production of 10,000 hectoliters in 1898. In 1928, 27 employees worked for Diebels and produced 24,500 hectoliters emissions. During the Second World War, there were only low destruction and the subsequent economic recovery was used to grow. In 1967, 175,000 hectoliters were produced emissions.

Up until the early 1970s, almost every beer common in Germany was brewed in the rather local brewery. The new strategy of the Diebels brewery became the Altbier specialist concept. Only a top-fermented Altbier was brewed and the Diebels brand was made known nationwide. This is how the rise to the largest German Altbier brewery with over 50 percent market share in Germany succeeded. Production reached 500,000 hectoliters as early as 1975 and 1,000,000 hectoliters six years later. In 1987, the Diebels brewery introduced the first alcohol-free Alt under the name Issumer Alt alcohol-free.

In the summer of 2001, the brewery, which had been private until then, was bought by the Interbrew Group for the equivalent of 100 million euros. After a brief affiliation with the Bremen brewery Beck & Co., the sales activities of all breweries in the InBev Group in Germany were brought together in 2003 in Interbrew Deutschland Vertriebs GmbH & Co KG.

After almost 30 years of complete specialization in Altbier, the Diebels brewery range was expanded again on February 13, 2005, as announced on October 8, 2004, to include a beer brewed in Pilsner style.

In January 2018, AB InBev announced its intention to sell Diebels together with the East German Hasseröder brewery to the financial investor CK Corporate Finance GmbH (CKCF) from Kronberg im Taunus (Hesse). The transaction was supposed to be completed by mid-2018, but fell through because the investor “failed to meet all contractual requirements to complete the transaction in mid-2018.” Discussions will continue with other potential buyers.

== Products ==
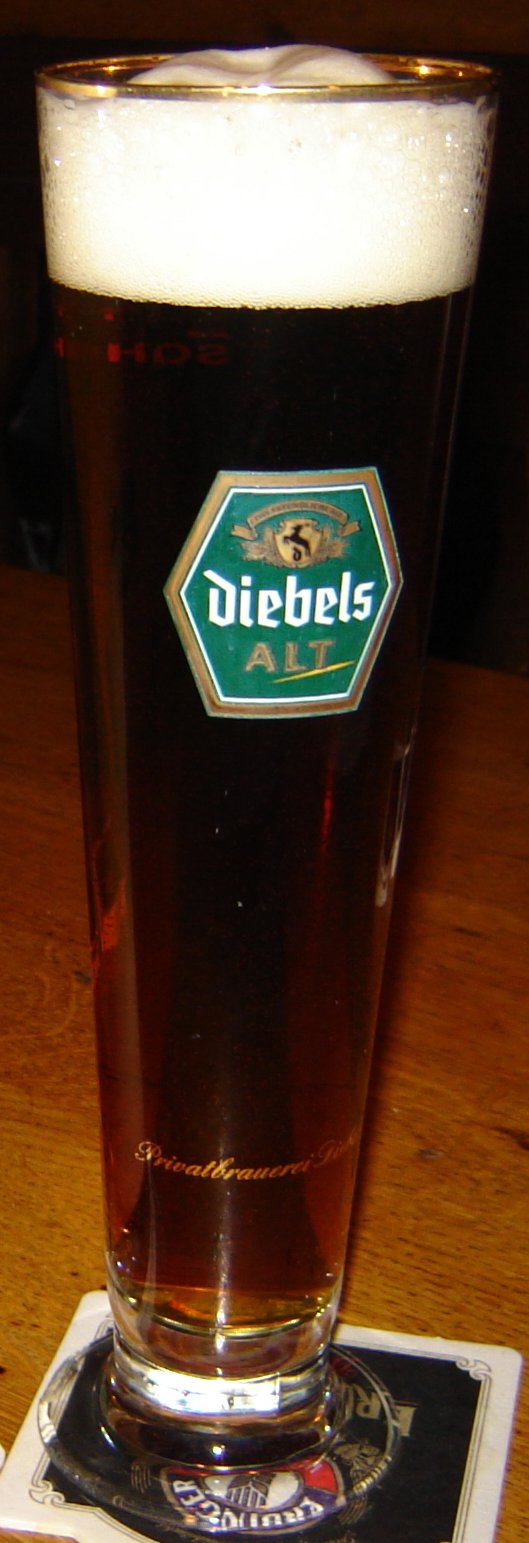
Diebels Alt

The following beers are currently sold under the Diebels label:

- Diebels – Altbier with an alcohol content of 4.9 percent by volume
- Diebels Alkoholfrei – alcohol-free variant of the Altbier
- Diebels Light – Altbier with 40 percent less alcohol
- Dimix – shandy based on Diebels Alt with cola
- Diebels Pils – a pilsner-type beer with an alcohol content of 4.9 percent by volume
- Dimix Erdbeer – shandy based on Diebels Alt with strawberry lemonade
