= 1995 North Rhine-Westphalia state election =

German state election

- 14 May 1995

All 221 seats in the Landtag of North Rhine-Westphalia, including 20 overhang and leveling seats 111 seats needed for a majority
- Turnout: 8,353,056 (64.0% ▼7.7 pp)
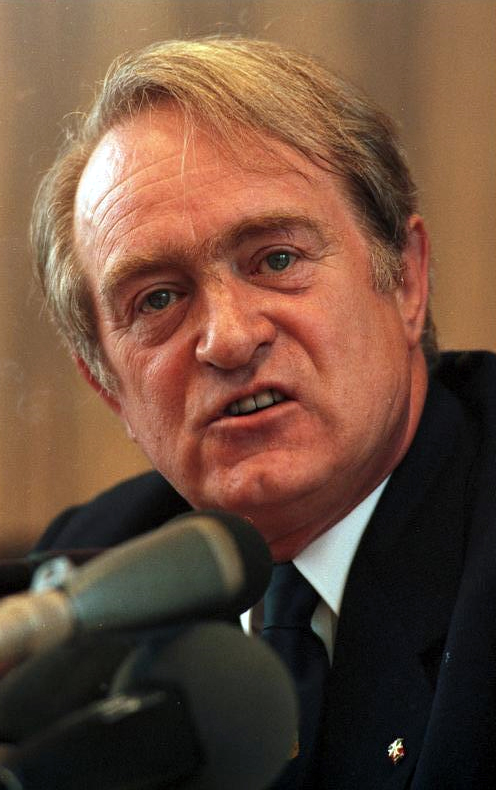

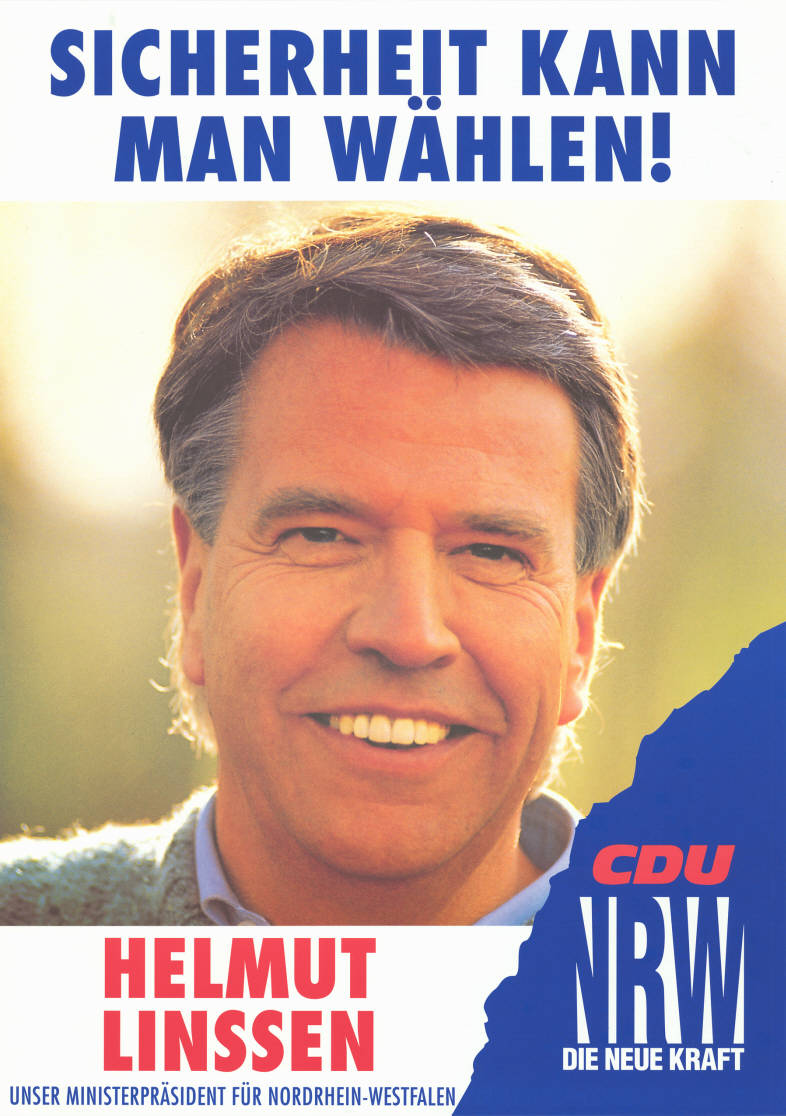

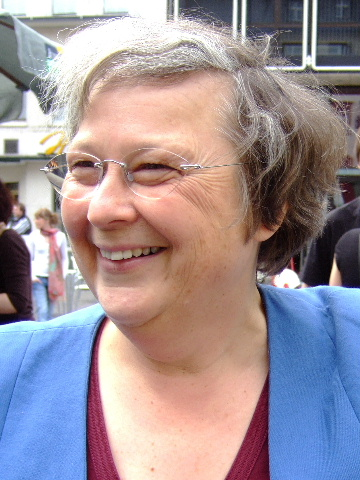

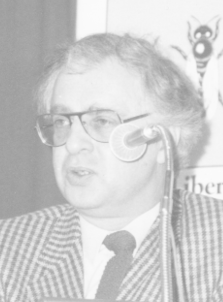
	First party	Second party
Candidate	Johannes Rau	Helmut Linssen
Party	SPD	CDU
Last election	122 seats, 50.0%	89 seats, 36.7%
Seats won	108	89
Seat change	▼14	0
Popular vote	3,816,639	3,124,758
Percentage	46.0%	37.7%
Swing	▼4.0 pp	▲1.0 pp
	Third party	Fourth party
Candidate	Bärbel Höhn	Achim Rohde
Party	Greens	FDP
Last election	12 seats, 5.0%	14 seats, 6.0%
Seats won	24	0
Seat change	▲12	▼14
Popular vote	830,861	332,634
Percentage	10.0%	4.0%
Swing	▲5.0 pp	▼1.8 pp
- Results for the single-member constituencies
Government before election
Fourth Rau cabinet
SPD
Government after election
Fifth Rau cabinet
SPD–Green

The 1995 North Rhine-Westphalia state election was held on 14 May 1995 to elect the 12th Landtag of North Rhine-Westphalia. The outgoing government was a majority of the Social Democratic Party (SPD), led by Minister-President Johannes Rau.

The SPD remained the largest party but lost its majority for the first time since 1980, declining to 46%. The opposition Christian Democratic Union (CDU) made small gains and took 37.7% of the vote. The Greens achieved a significant victory, doubling their vote share to 10% and winning 24 seats. Since the Free Democratic Party (FDP) fell below the 5% electoral threshold and lost representation, the Greens alone held the balance of power. They subsequently formed a coalition with the SPD.

== Electoral system ==
The Landtag was elected via mixed-member proportional representation. 151 members were elected in single-member constituencies via first-past-the-post voting, and fifty then allocated using compensatory proportional representation. A single ballot was used for both. The minimum size of the Landtag was 201 members, but if overhang seats were present, proportional leveling seats were added to ensure proportionality. An electoral threshold of 5% of valid votes is applied to the Landtag; parties that fall below this threshold are ineligible to receive seats.

== Background ==
In the previous election held on 13 May 1990, the SPD retained a reduced majority with just under 50% of the vote. The CDU failed to recoup their losses from the previous election and took 37%, while the FDP remained steady on 6% and the Greens narrowly surpassed 5% and won seats for the first time. The SPD won 121 of the 151 constituencies, necessitating the addition of leveling seats which boosted the Landtag to a record size of 237 members (later 239 after an election review). The SPD once again formed government alone and Johannes Rau continued as Minister-President.

== Parties ==
The table below lists parties represented in the 11th Landtag of North Rhine-Westphalia.

Name		Ideology	Lead candidate	1990 result	
Name		Ideology	Lead candidate	Votes (%)	Seats
SPD	Social Democratic Party of Germany; Sozialdemokratische Partei Deutschlands	Social democracy	Johannes Rau	50.0%	122 / 237
CDU	Christian Democratic Union of Germany; Christlich Demokratische Union Deutschlands	Christian democracy	Helmut Linssen	36.7%	89 / 237
FDP	Free Democratic Party; Freie Demokratische Partei	Classical liberalism	Achim Rohde	5.8%	14 / 237
GRÜNE	Alliance 90/The Greens; Bündnis 90/Die Grünen	Green politics	Bärbel Höhn	5.0%	12 / 237

== Campaign ==
The election followed the October 1994 federal election and March 1995 Hessian state election, both of which had seen victories for the incumbent government and significant gains for the Greens. In Hesse, the SPD suffered its worst result since 1946.

The CDU held a membership ballot to select their lead candidate. With 59.6% of votes, Landtag faction leader Helmut Linssen prevailed against MdB and state secretary Norbert Lammert.

Beside the influence of federal politics, where popular support for the Kohl government was declining due to growing economic difficulties, environmental issues dominated the campaign. Garzweiler II, a proposed lignite-mining project, was particularly contentious: the project, which would have involved forced resettlement of local residents, was generally supported by the SPD and firmly rejected by the Greens. The CDU opposition focused on topics such as education, domestic security and crime, and support for local industries, though their positions were not markedly different from those of the SPD. As such, most controversy during the campaign was between the SPD and the Greens.

== Results ==
Graph of the party split among 221 seats.
Party	Votes	%	+/–	Seats			
Party	Votes	%	+/–	Con.	List	Total	+/–
Social Democratic Party (SPD)	3,816,639	46.02	–3.96	108	0	108	–14
Christian Democratic Union (CDU)	3,124,758	37.67	+0.97	43	46	89	±0
Alliance 90/The Greens (GRÜNE)	830,861	10.02	+4.97	0	24	24	+12
Free Democratic Party (FDP)	332,634	4.01	–1.75	0	0	0	–14
The Republicans (REP)	65,509	0.79	–1.06	0	0	0	±0
The Grays – Gray Panthers (GRAUE)	58,155	0.70	New	0	0	0	New
Ecological Democratic Party (ÖDP)	21,159	0.26	–0.24	0	0	0	±0
Natural Law Party (Naturgesetz)	12,948	0.16	New	0	0	0	New
Human Environment Animal Protection Party (Tierschutzpartei)	9,936	0.12	New	0	0	0	New
German Communist Party (DKP)	6,008	0.07	+0.04	0	0	0	±0
Party of Bible-abiding Christians (PBC)	5,777	0.07	New	0	0	0	New
Statt Party (STATT)	3,034	0.04	New	0	0	0	New
Rhineland Party – The European Federalists (RP)	2,757	0.03	New	0	0	0	New
Civil Rights Movement Solidarity (BüSo)	850	0.01	New	0	0	0	New
Christian Centre (CM)	556	0.01	±0.00	0	0	0	±0
Drivers' and Citizens' Interest Party (APD)	516	0.01	New	0	0	0	New
Family Party of Germany (FAMILIE)	273	0.00	±0.00	0	0	0	±0
Independent Workers' Party (UAP)	152	0.00	New	0	0	0	New
Consciousness (Bewußtsein)	103	0.00	New	0	0	0	New
Humanist Party (HP)	40	0.00	New	0	0	0	New
Independents	1,570	0.02	–0.03	0	–	0	±0
Total	8,294,235	100.00	–	151	70	221	–16
Valid votes	8,294,235	99.30					
Invalid/blank votes	58,821	0.70					
Total votes	8,353,056	100.00					
Registered voters/turnout	13,041,964	64.05					
