= Kleve (district) =

Kleve Cleves
- District
- Flag Coat of arms
- Coordinates: 51°40′N 6°15′E
- Country: Germany
- State: North Rhine-Westphalia
- Adm. region: Düsseldorf
- Capital: Kleve (Cleves)

Government
  - District admin.: Christoph Gerwers (CDU)

Area
  - Total: 1,232.15 km^{2} (475.74 sq mi)

Population (31 December 2023)
  - Total: 321,491
  - Density: 260/km^{2} (680/sq mi)
- Time zone: UTC+01:00 (CET)
  - Summer (DST): UTC+02:00 (CEST)
- Vehicle registration: KLE, GEL
- Website: kreis-kleve.de

Kleve (Cleves in English use) or Kreis Kleve is a Kreis (local-government district) in the Lower Rhine region of northwestern North Rhine-Westphalia, Germany. Neighbouring districts are Borken, Wesel, and Viersen in Germany, and the Dutch provinces of Limburg and Gelderland.

== History ==
The district in its current borders was created in 1975 when the former district of Kleve and Geldern was merged with the Rees District towns of Emmerich and Rees and the Moers District municipality of Rheurdt.

The two precursor districts had been created in 1816 when the whole of the Rhineland became a province of Prussia. Territorially they corresponded roughly to the historic Duchies of Cleves and Guelders.

== Geography ==
The district is located in the lower valley of the Rhine, in the region where that river flows into the Netherlands.

== Coat of arms ==
The coat of arms, which was granted in 1983, combines the shields of the two constituent duchies.

The dexter side depicts the emblem of the dukes of Cleves: On a red (gules) field a white (argent) escutcheon (shield shape) with an eightfold fleur-de-lys (escarbuncle/metal shield reinforcement). The sinister side shows a golden (or) lion (in rampant position) on a blue (azure) field (background): the emblem of the dukes of Geldern.

== Towns and municipalities ==
Clickable map of towns and municipalities in the district

Towns (Städte)
1. Emmerich am Rhein
2. Geldern
3. Goch
4. Kalkar
5. Kevelaer
6. Kleve (Cleves)
7. Rees
8. Straelen
Municipalities (Gemeinden)
1. Bedburg-Hau
2. Issum
3. Kerken
4. Kranenburg
5. Rheurdt
6. Uedem
7. Wachtendonk
8. Weeze

== Gallery of churches in Kleve ==
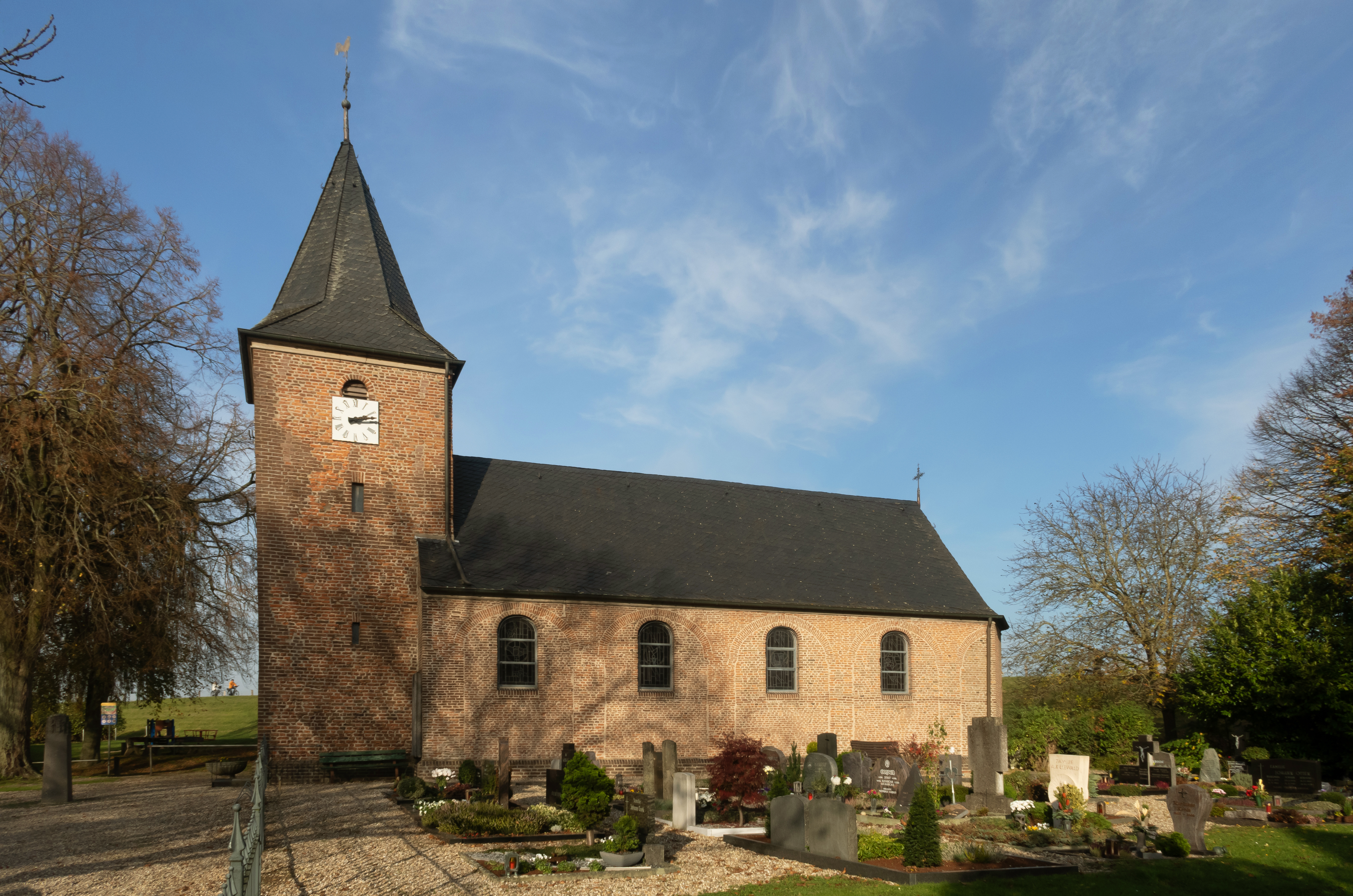
Bimmen, St. Martin

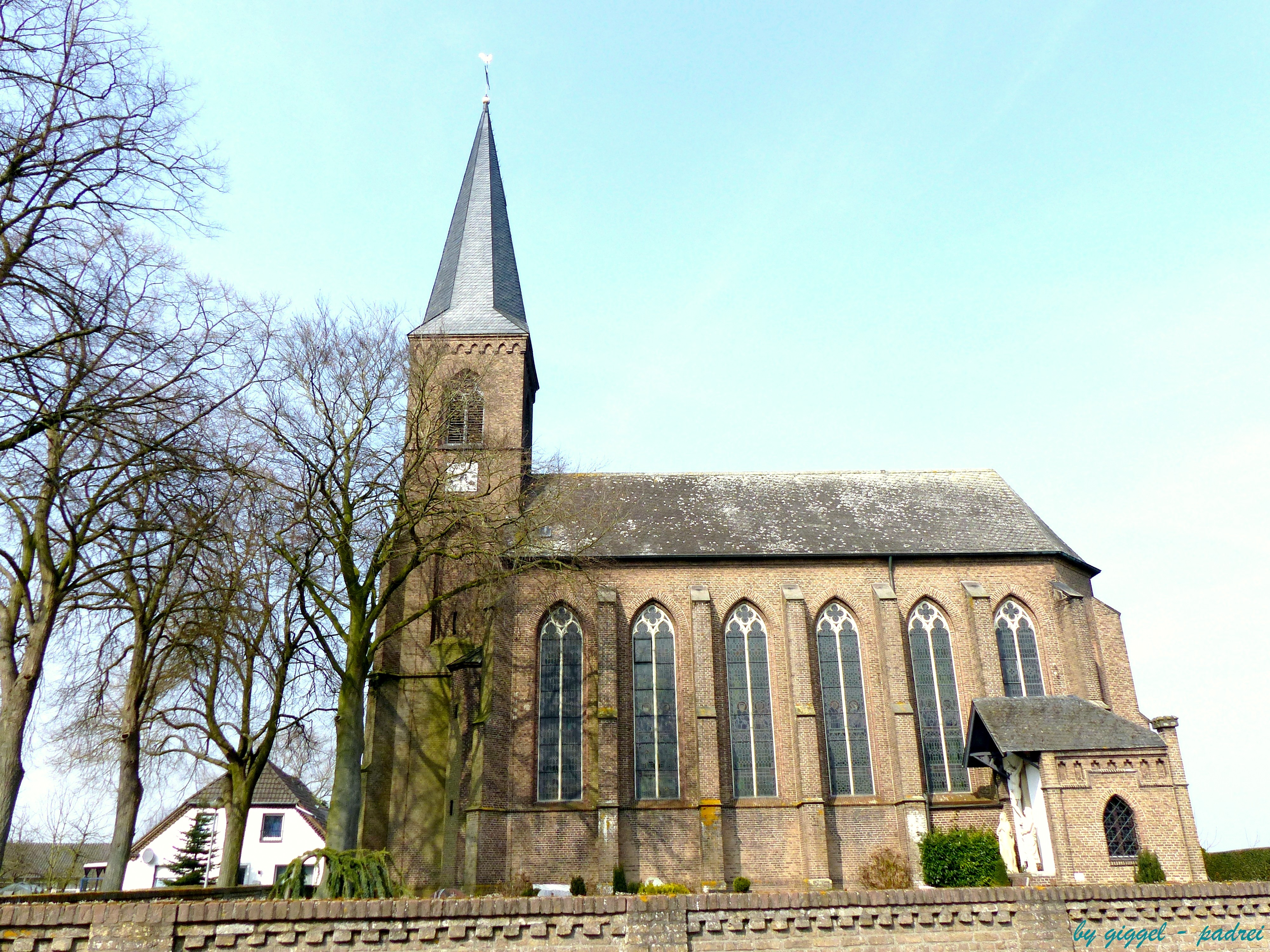
Düffelward, St. Maurice

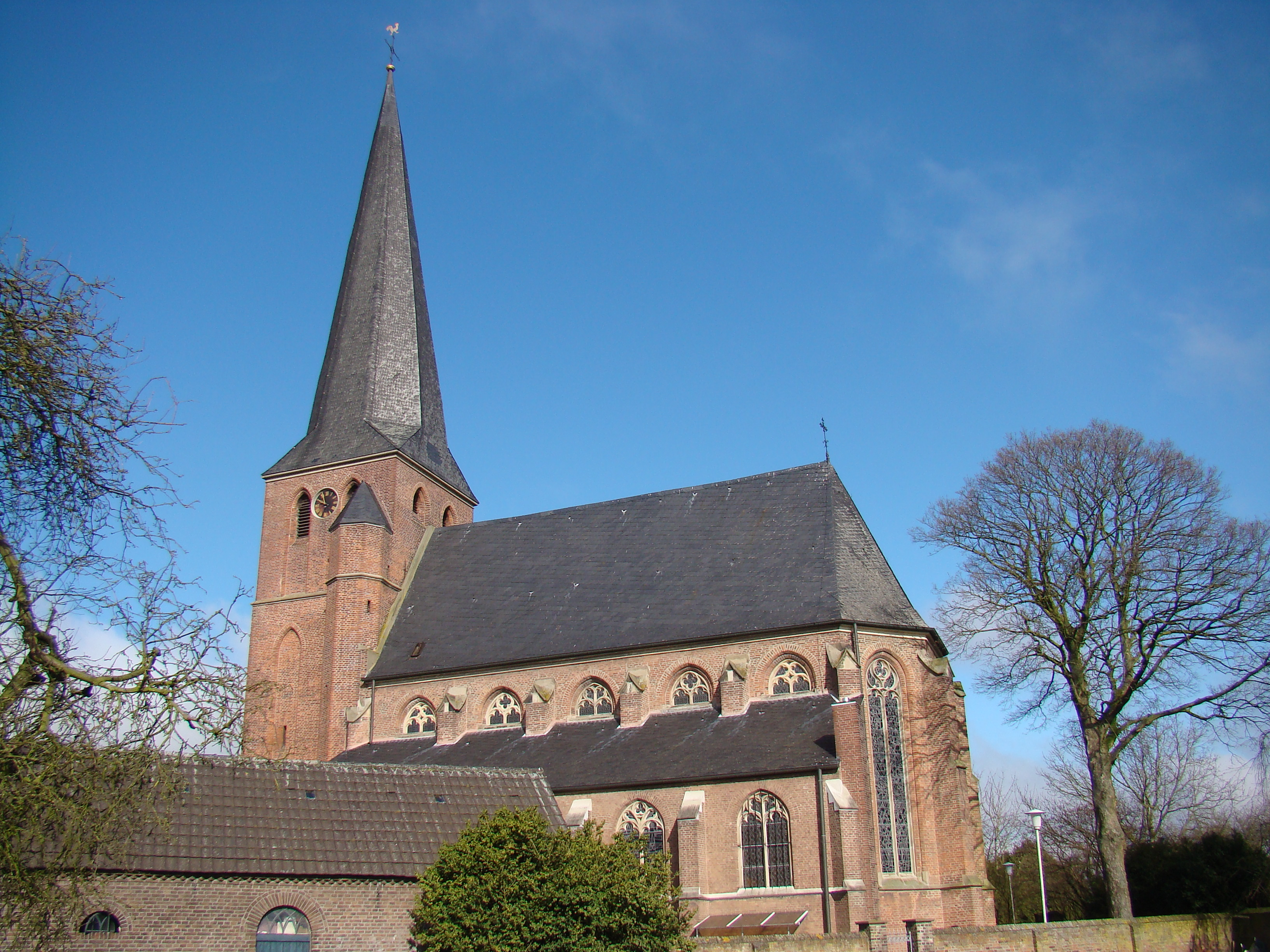
Griethausen, St. Martin

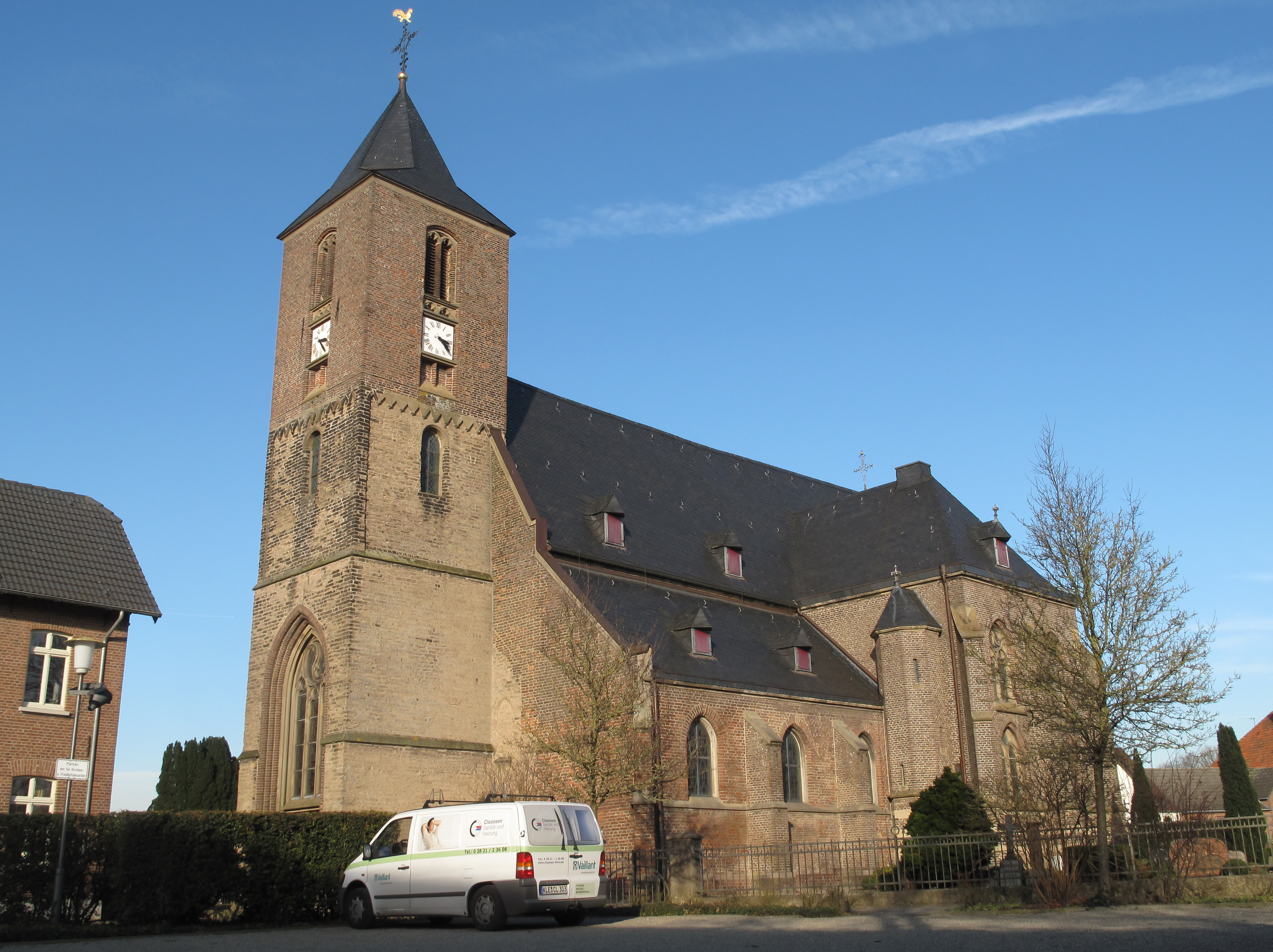
Keeken, St. Mariae Himmelfahrt

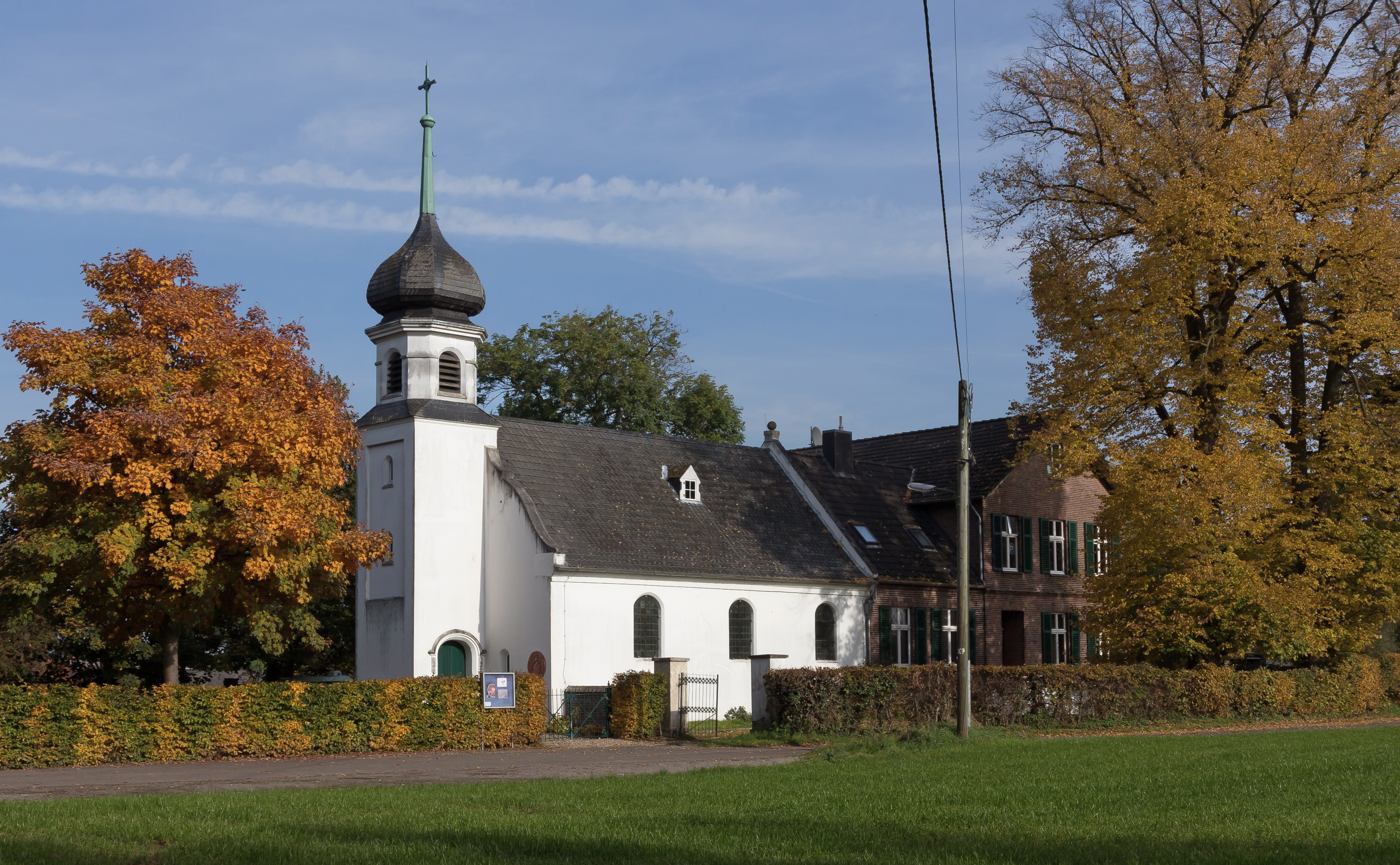
Keeken, Reformed church

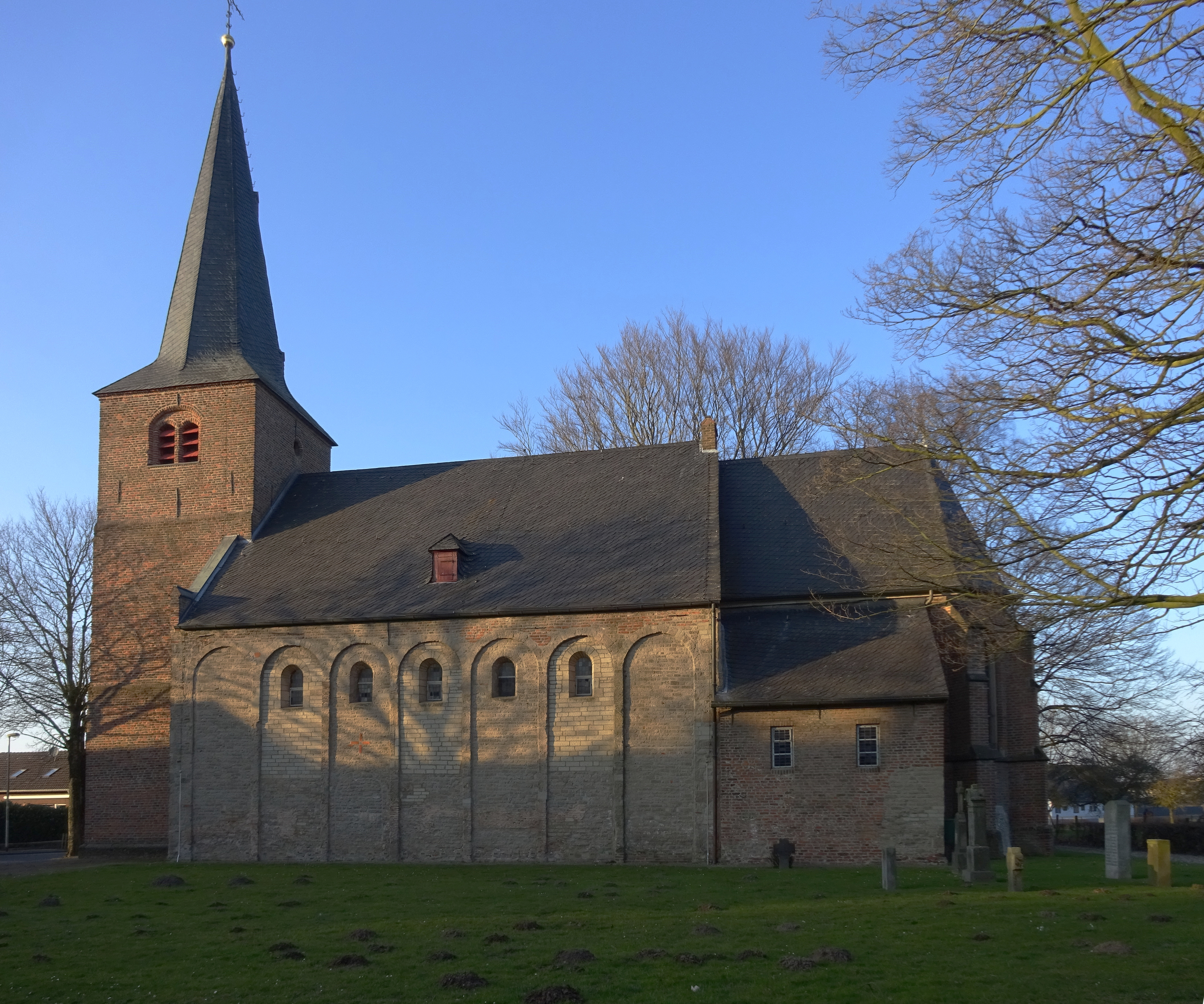
Kellen, St. Willibrord

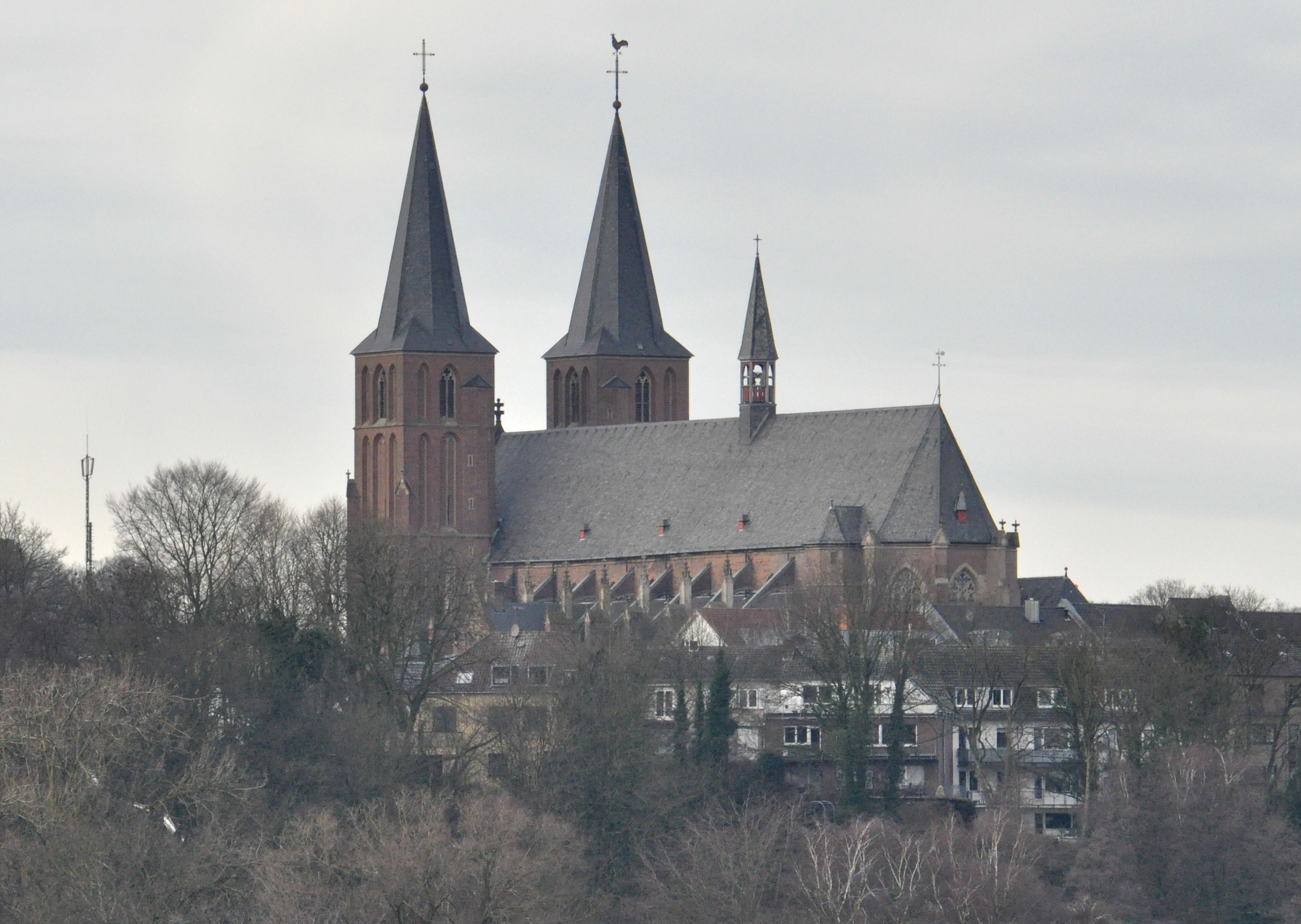
Kleve, St. Mariae Himmelfahrt

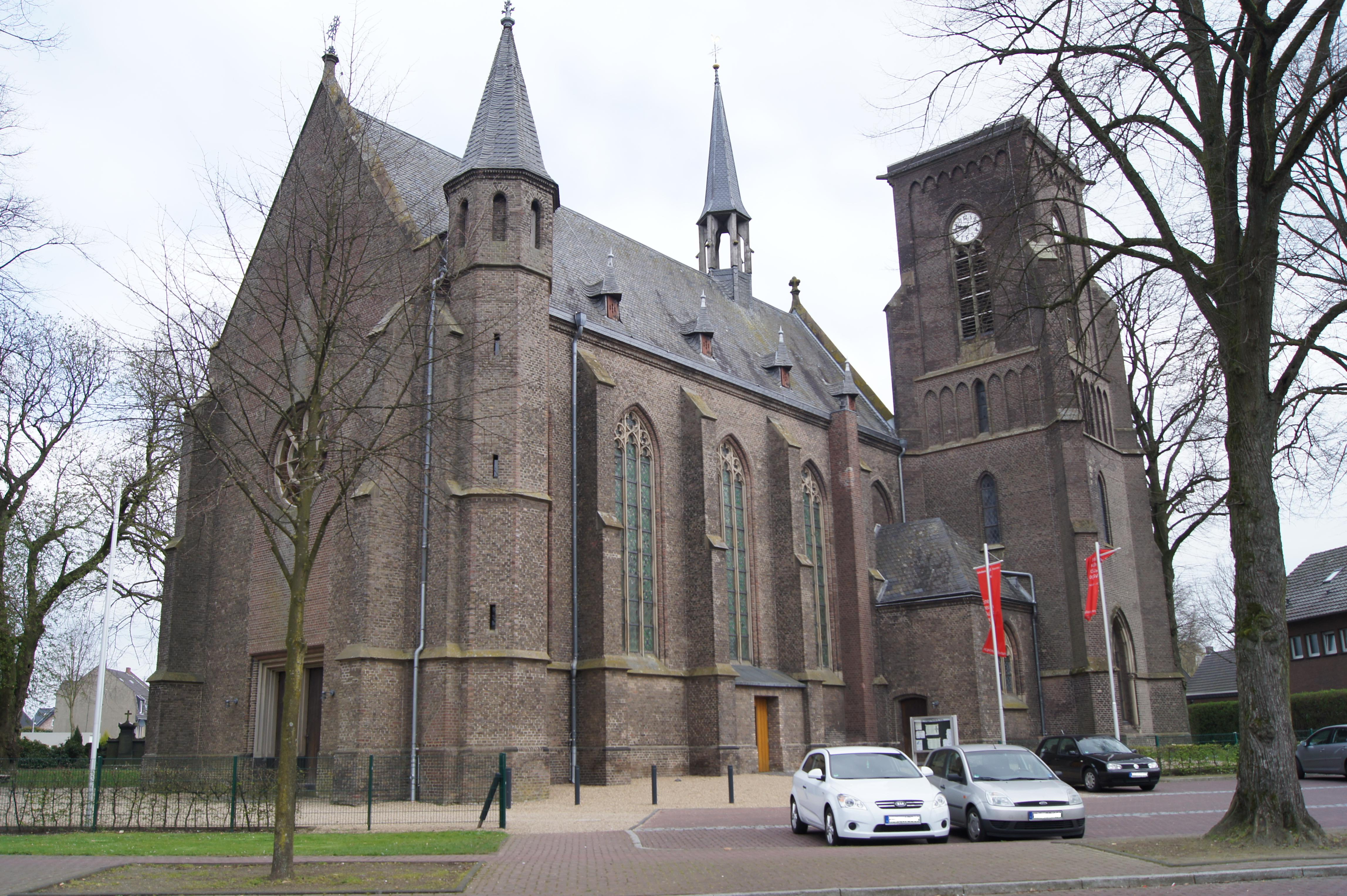
Materborn, St. Anna

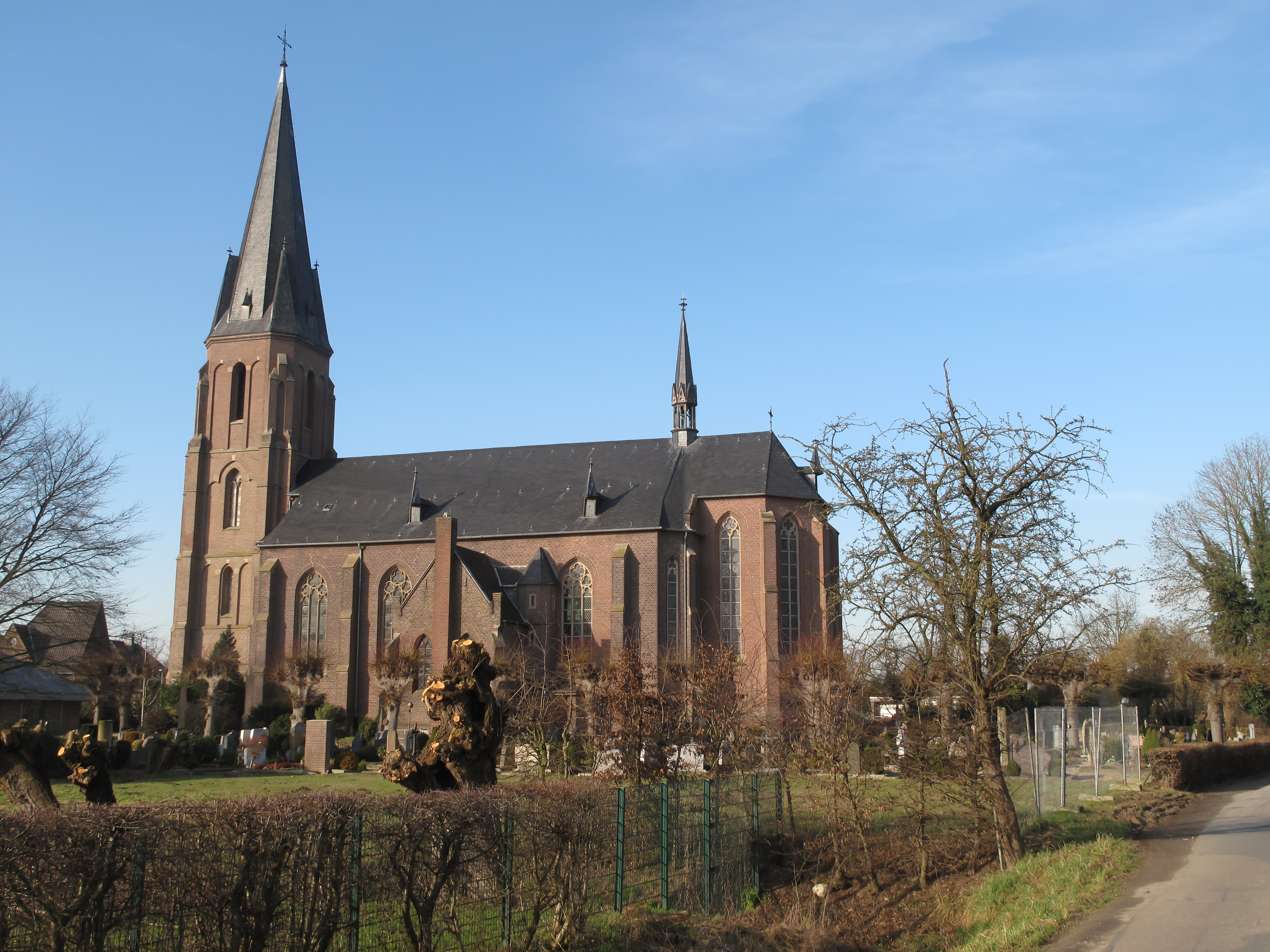
Rindern, St. Willibrord

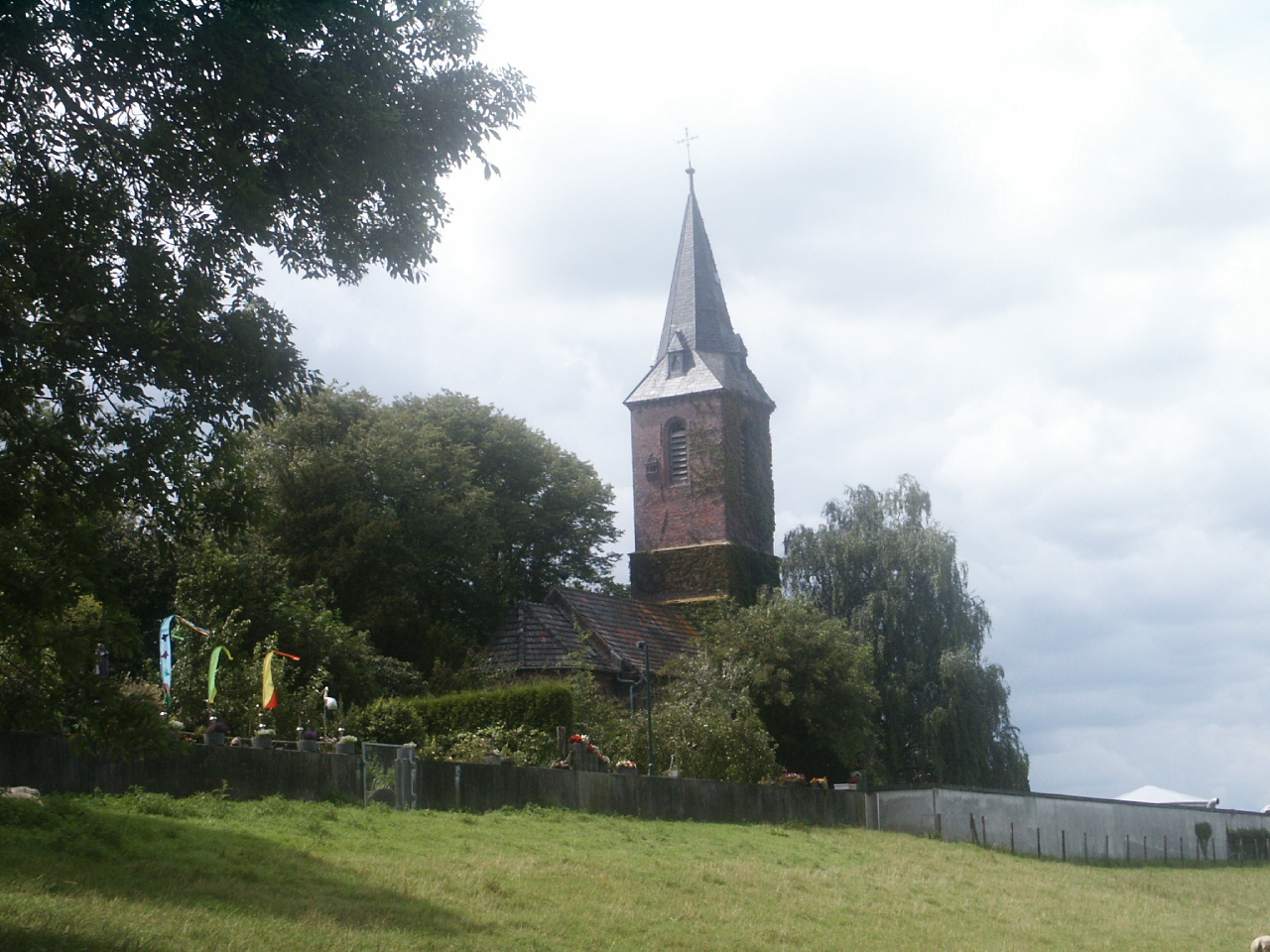
Schenkenschanz, Reformed church
