= Rheurdt =

- Municipality
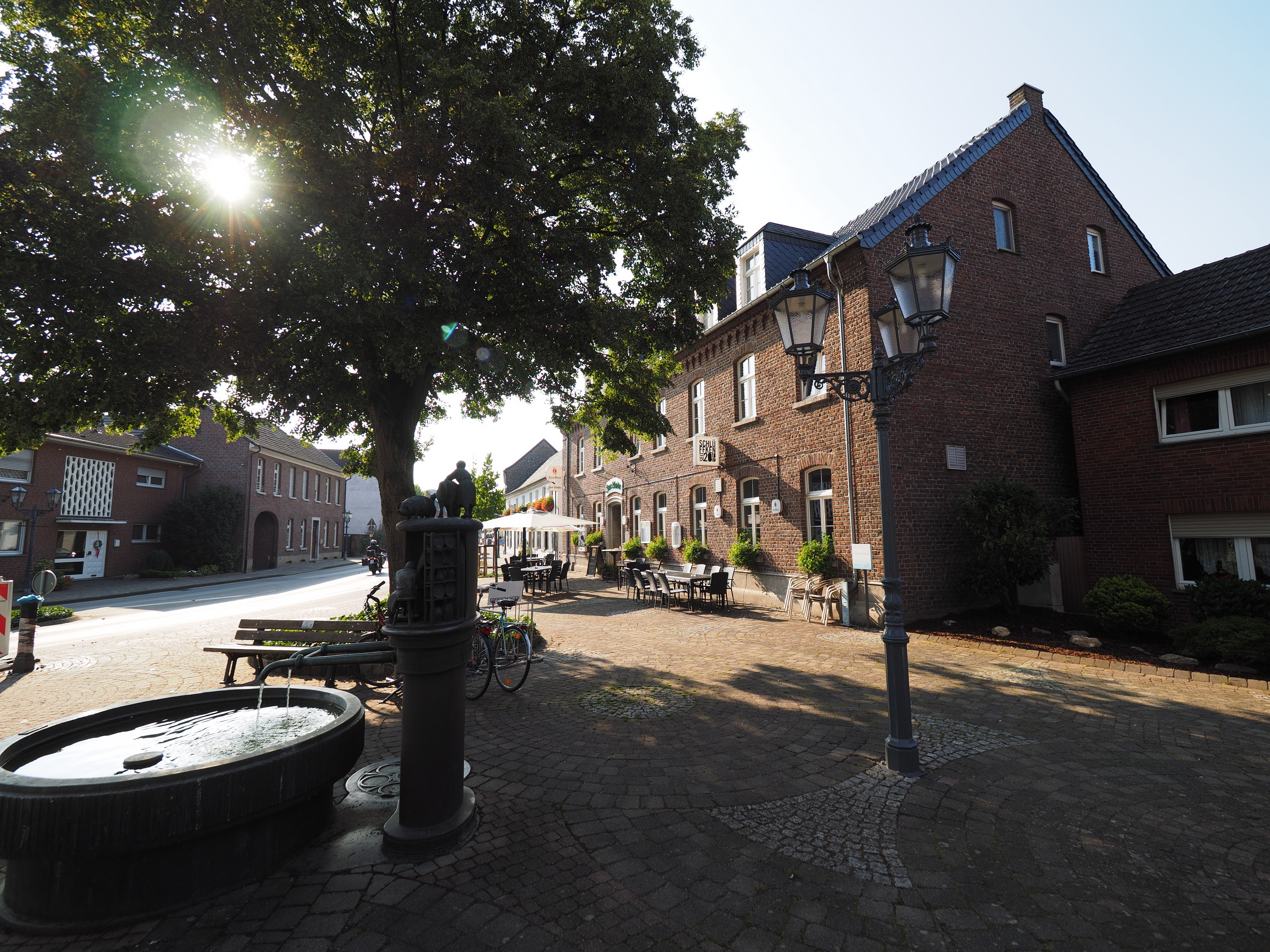

- Coat of arms

- Location of Rheurdt within Kleve district
- Interactive map of Rheurdt
- Location within Germany Location within North Rhine-Westphalia
- Coordinates: 51°28′00″N 06°28′00″E
- Country: Germany
- State: North Rhine-Westphalia
- Admin. region: Düsseldorf
- District: Kleve
- Subdivisions: 2

Government
  - Mayor (2020–25): Dirk Ketelaers (SPD)

Area
  - Total: 30.03 km^{2} (11.59 sq mi)
- Elevation: 30 m (98 ft)

Population (2025-12-31)
  - Total: 6,350
  - Density: 211/km^{2} (548/sq mi)
- Time zone: UTC+01:00 (CET)
  - Summer (DST): UTC+02:00 (CEST)
- Postal codes: 47509
- Dialling codes: 0 28 45 / 0 28 33
- Vehicle registration: KLE, GEL
- Website: www.rheurdt.de

Rheurdt (German pronunciation: [ʁøːɐ̯t]) is a municipality in the district of Cleves, in North Rhine-Westphalia, Germany. It is located approximately 10 kilometres (6.2 mi) west of Moers.

== History ==
Rheurdt was first mentioned in a tax record in 1294 as "Rurde" or "Rorde", in the 14th century as Roirt, Roerdt, Reuerde, that resulted in today's name of "Rheurdt".

In 1969, during the first local government reorganization of North Rhine-Westphalia, the villages of Rheurdt and Schaephuysen were merged into the new municipality Rheurdt.

== Geography ==
Rheurdt lies left of the river Rhine in the Lower Rhine region. Rheurdt shares a border with Issum to the north, Kamp-Lintfort and Neukirchen-Vluyn to the east, Kempen to the south and Kerken to the West.

== Population ==
Historical population

Year	Pop.	±% p.a.
1965	4,429	—
1970	5,108	+2.89%
1975	5,508	+1.52%
1980	5,604	+0.35%
1985	5,617	+0.05%
1990	5,511	−0.38%
1995	5,983	+1.66%

Year	Pop.	±% p.a.
2000	6,433	+1.46%
2005	6,651	+0.67%
2010	6,736	+0.25%
2015	6,709	−0.08%
2020	6,545	−0.49%
2025	6,350	−0.60%

Source: Landesdatabank Nordrhein-Westfalen

== Notable people ==
- Hugo Hammans, Member of the German Bundestag from 1965 to 1980
- Antje Schomaker, musician and songwriter
- Viktor Josef Dammertz, Benedictine monk and Bishop of the Diocese of Augsburg from 1992 to 2004
- Hans-Jakob Tebarth, historian
