= Issum =

- Municipality
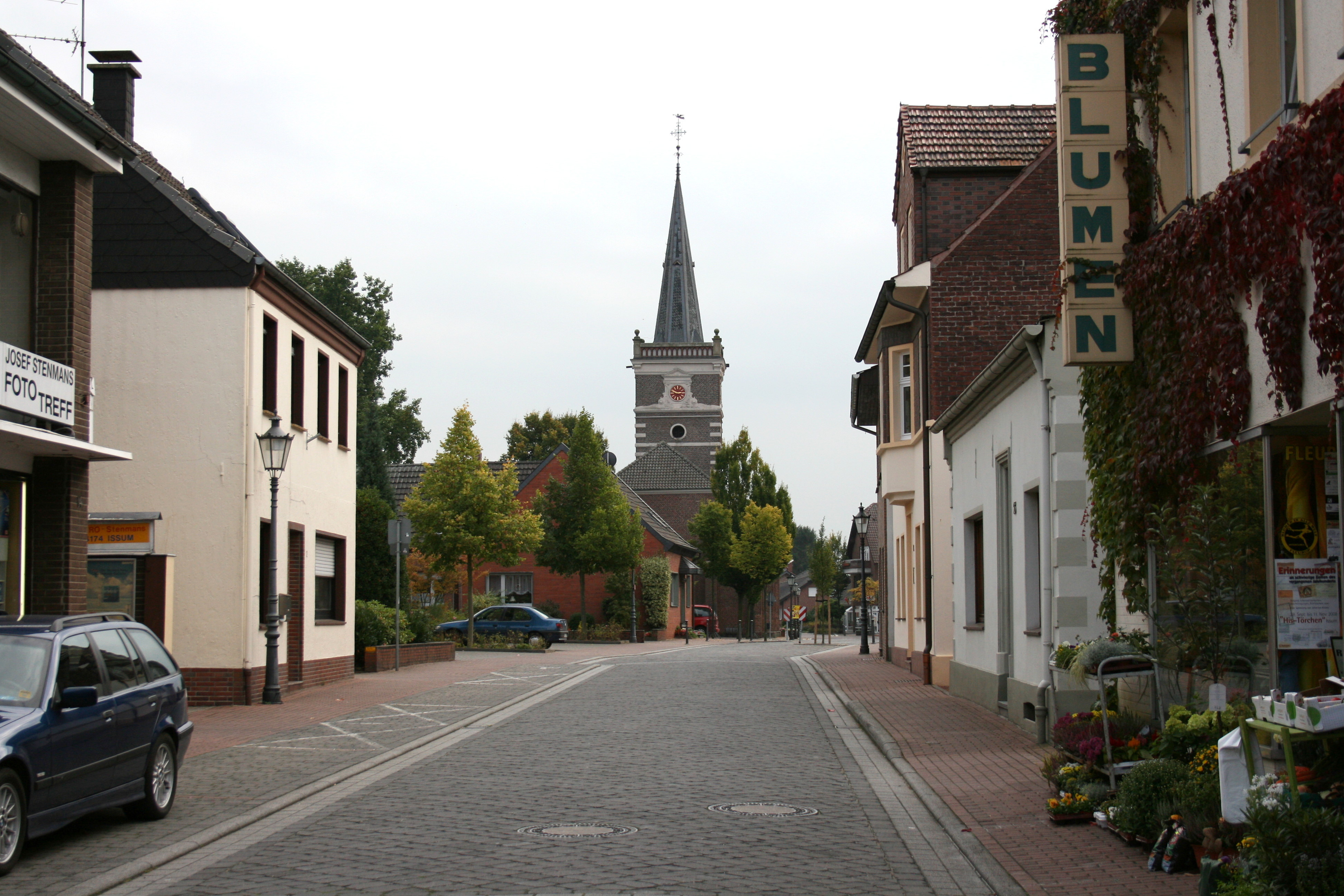

- Coat of arms

- Location of Issum within Kleve district
- Interactive map of Issum
- Location within Germany Location within North Rhine-Westphalia
- Coordinates: 51°32′20″N 06°25′25″E
- Country: Germany
- State: North Rhine-Westphalia
- Admin. region: Düsseldorf
- District: Kleve
- Subdivisions: 2

Government
  - Mayor (2020–25): Clemens Brüx (Ind.)

Area
  - Total: 54.74 km^{2} (21.14 sq mi)
- Elevation: 24 m (79 ft)

Population (2025-12-31)
  - Total: 12,449
  - Density: 227.4/km^{2} (589.0/sq mi)
- Time zone: UTC+01:00 (CET)
  - Summer (DST): UTC+02:00 (CEST)
- Postal codes: 47661
- Dialling codes: 0 28 35
- Vehicle registration: KLE
- Website: www.issum.de

Issum (German pronunciation: [ˈɪsʊm]) is a municipality in the district of Kleve, in North Rhine-Westphalia, Germany. It is located approximately 5 kilometres (3.1 mi) east of Geldern.

== Population ==
Historical population

Year	Pop.	±% p.a.
1965	8,475	—
1970	8,807	+0.77%
1975	9,150	+0.77%
1980	10,035	+1.86%
1985	10,588	+1.08%
1990	10,970	+0.71%
1995	11,793	+1.46%

Year	Pop.	±% p.a.
2000	12,093	+0.50%
2005	12,172	+0.13%
2010	11,931	−0.40%
2015	12,037	+0.18%
2020	12,113	+0.13%
2025	12,449	+0.55%

Source: Landesdatabank Nordrhein-Westfalen

== Economy ==
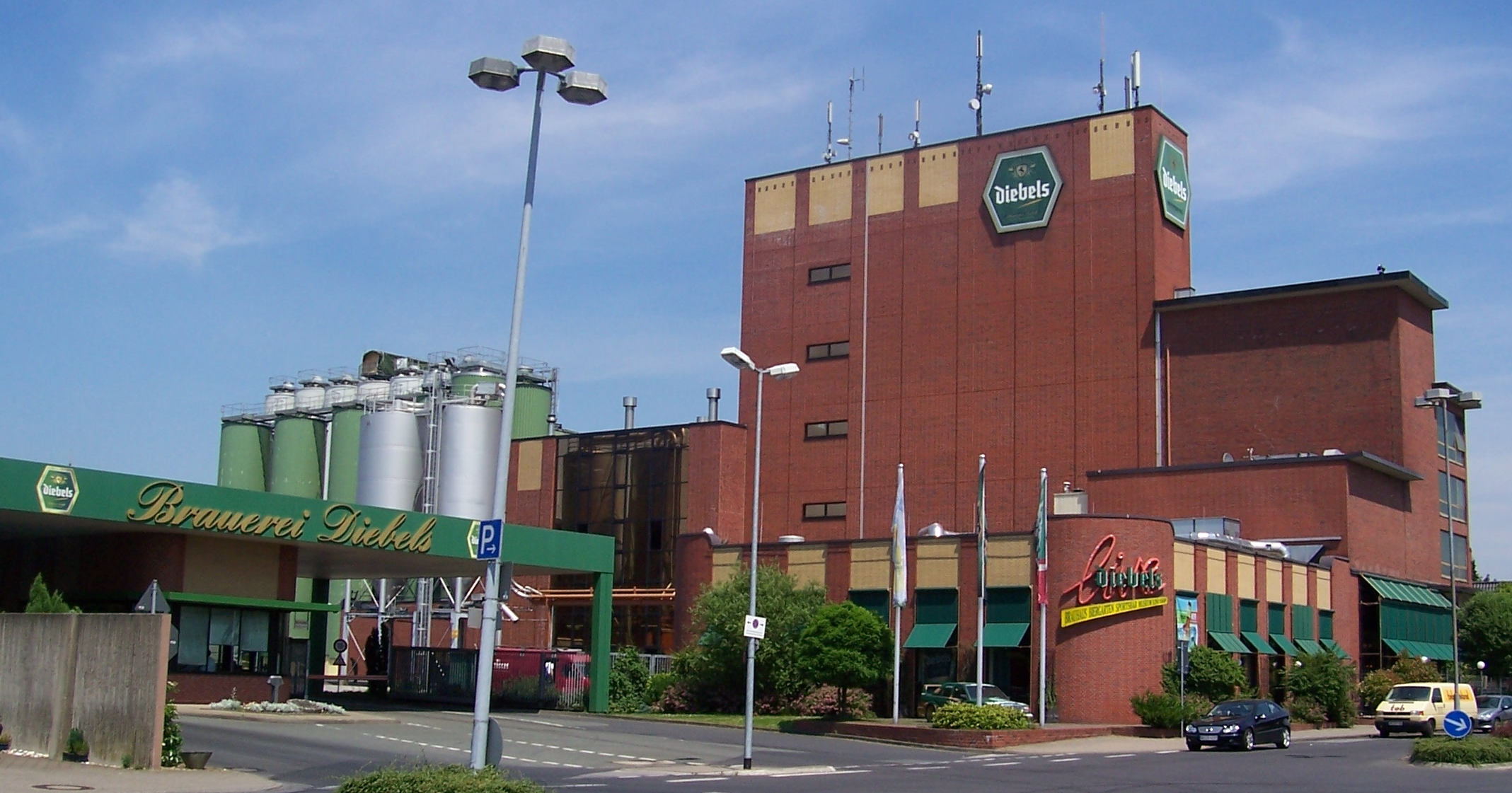
Diebels brewery

Issum is home to the Diebels brewery, the largest altbier brewery in the world.

== Notable natives ==
- Isabell Werth (born 1969), German equestrian
- Peter Wollny (born 1961), German musicologist
