= Breyell station =

Railway station in Nettetal, Germany

Breyell
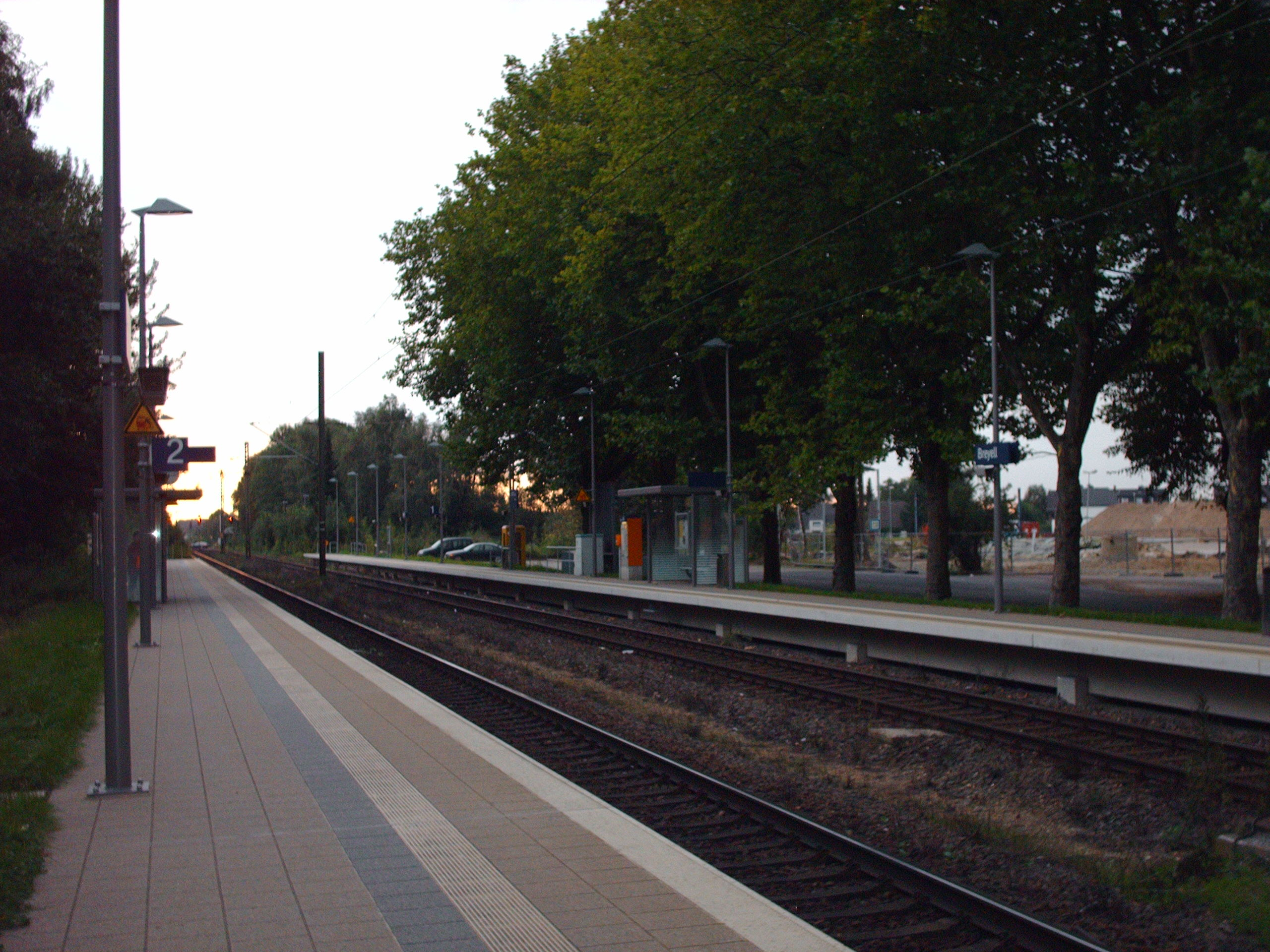
- Breyell railway station

General information
- Location: Breyell, North Rhine-Westphalia; Germany
- Coordinates: 51.1740°N 6.1430°E
- System: Bf
- Line: Viersen–Venlo railway
- Platforms: 2

Other information
- Fare zone: VRR: 206
Location

Breyell (German: Bahnhof Breyell) is a railway station located in Breyell, Germany. The station opened on 29 January 1866 is located on the Viersen–Venlo railway. The train services are operated by Eurobahn.

== Train services ==
The following services currently call at the station:

- Regional services RE 13 Venlo - Mönchengladbach - Düsseldorf - Wuppertal - Hamm

Preceding station		Following station
Kaldenkirchen towards Venlo	RE 13	Boisheim towards Hamm (Westf) Hbf
