= Dülken station =

Railway station in Viersen, Germany

Dülken
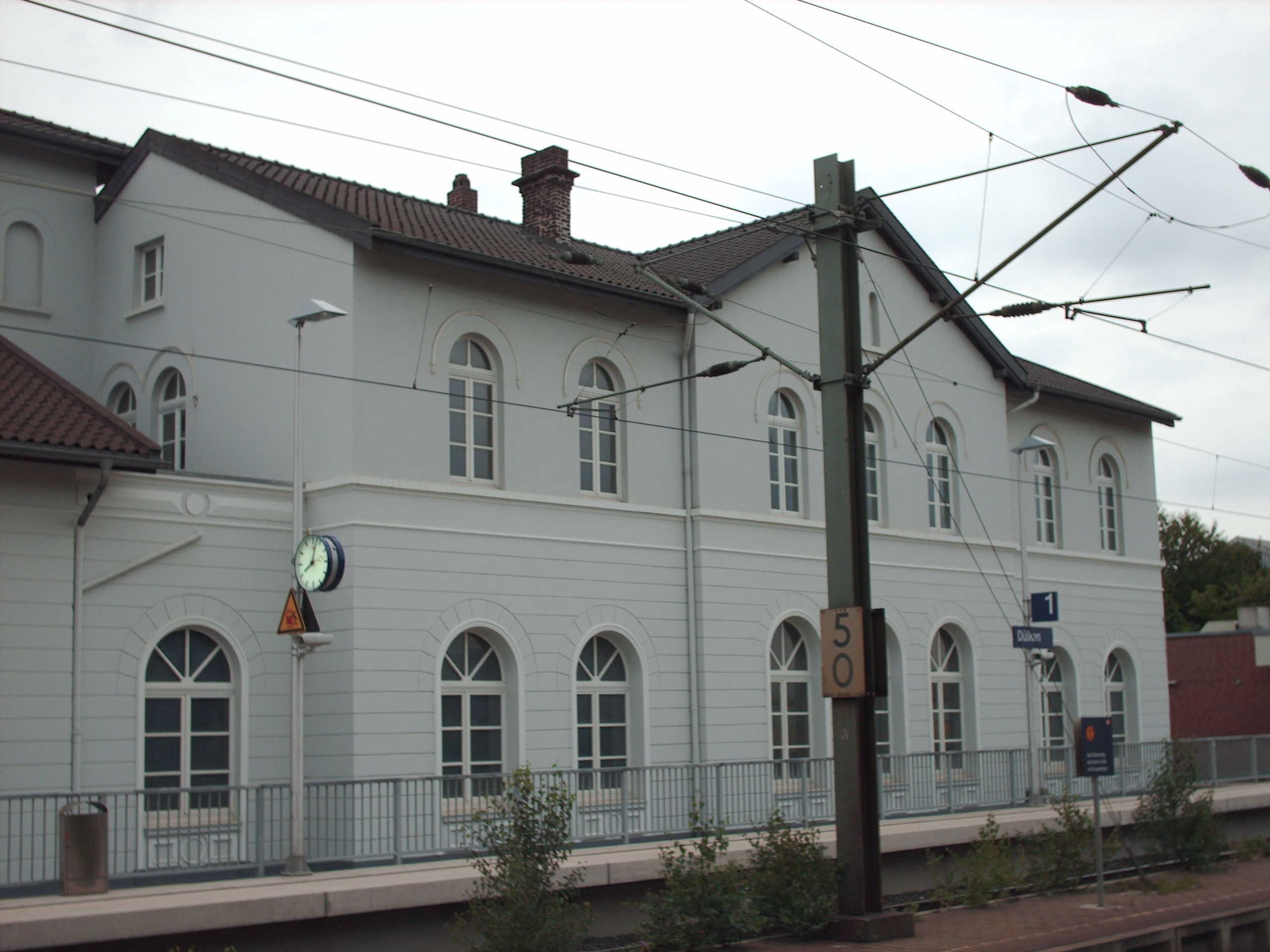
- Dülken railway station

General information
- Location: Dülken, North Rhine-Westphalia; Germany
- Coordinates: 51.1525°N 6.2017°E
- System: Bf
- Line: Viersen–Venlo railway
- Platforms: 2

Other information
- Fare zone: VRR: 312
Location

Dülken (German: Bahnhof Dülken) is a railway station located in Dülken, Germany. The station opened on 29 January 1866, and is located on the Viersen–Venlo railway. The train services are operated by Eurobahn.

== Train services ==
The following services currently call at the station:

- Regional services RE 13 Venlo - Mönchengladbach - Düsseldorf - Wuppertal - Hamm

Preceding station		Following station
Boisheim towards Venlo	RE 13	Viersen towards Hamm (Westf) Hbf
