= Kaldenkirchen station =

Railway station in Nettetal, Germany

Kaldenkirchen
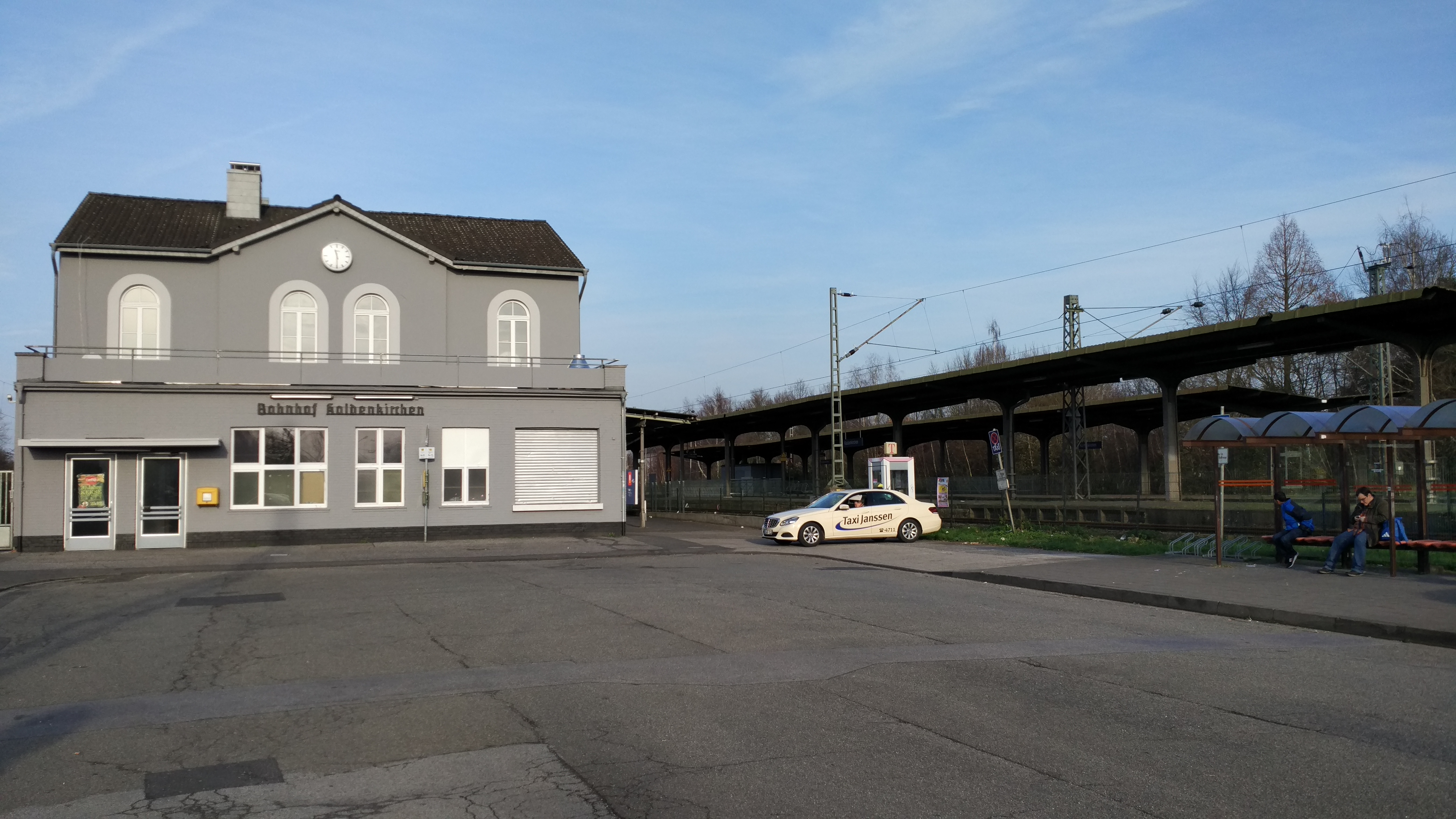

General information
- Location: Kaldenkirchen, Nettetal, NRW; Germany
- Coordinates: 51°19′38″N 6°12′10″E
- Owner: DB Netz
- Operator: DB Station&Service
- Lines: Viersen–Venlo railway; Kempen–Venlo railway (closed)

Construction
- Accessible: No

Other information
- Station code: 3087
- DS100 code: KKAK
- Category: 5
- Fare zone: VRR: 200
- Website: www.bahnhof.de

Services
Preceding station		Following station
Venlo Terminus	RE 13	Breyell towards Hamm (Westf) Hbf
Location
- Location within North Rhine-Westphalia

Kaldenkirchen station is the railway station on the Viersen–Venlo railway in the municipality of Kaldenkirchen, itself a town part of Nettetal in the Viersen district in western Germany. Between 1867 and 1999 it was also on the now closed Kempen–Venlo railway.

It is situated at the far western end of the Viersen to Venlo line, about three kilometers away from the Dutch border. In former times, it saw some high-profile traffic due to border regulations, but has largely fallen into disuse since the Schengen agreement has become effective. It is still pending renovation.

== Train services ==
Trains of the RE13 line call hourly at the station. There are no other passenger services, though the station sees a good number of through freight services going through to Venlo railway station and further into the Netherlands. The freight yard of the station therefore has fallen into disuse and is pending demolition.

The following services currently call at the station:

- Regional services RE 13 Venlo - Mönchengladbach - Düsseldorf - Hamm
