= Leo Anton Karl de Ball =

German-Austrian astronomer

Leo Anton Karl de Ball.

Asteroids discovered: 1
230 Athamantis	September 3, 1882	MPC

Leo Anton Karl de Ball (November 23, 1853 – December 12, 1916) was a German-Austrian astronomer. He is credited by the Minor Planet Center as "K. de Ball" for his (sole) asteroid discovery, but seems to be best known as Leo de Ball.

He was born at Lobberich in the Rhineland, in the Kingdom of Prussia. He studied in Bonn and Berlin, receiving his doctorate in 1877. He worked at observatories in Gotha and at Bothkamp, discovering the asteroid 230 Athamantis at the latter in 1882. He then worked at Ougrée Observatory in Ougrée, Belgium, where he analyzed the mass of Saturn and worked on celestial mechanics and measurements of parallax and of double stars.

From 1891 until his death in 1916 he was director of the Kuffner observatory in Vienna. Among other things, he measured the parallax of a number of stars and compiled data for a star catalog.
