= Leuth =

Leuth may refer to:

- Leuth (Netherlands); A town near the German border in Gelderland
- Leuth (Germany); A town near the Dutch border in North Rhine-Westphalia
