= Kempen–Venlo railway =

Railway line in Germany

Kempen–Venlo line
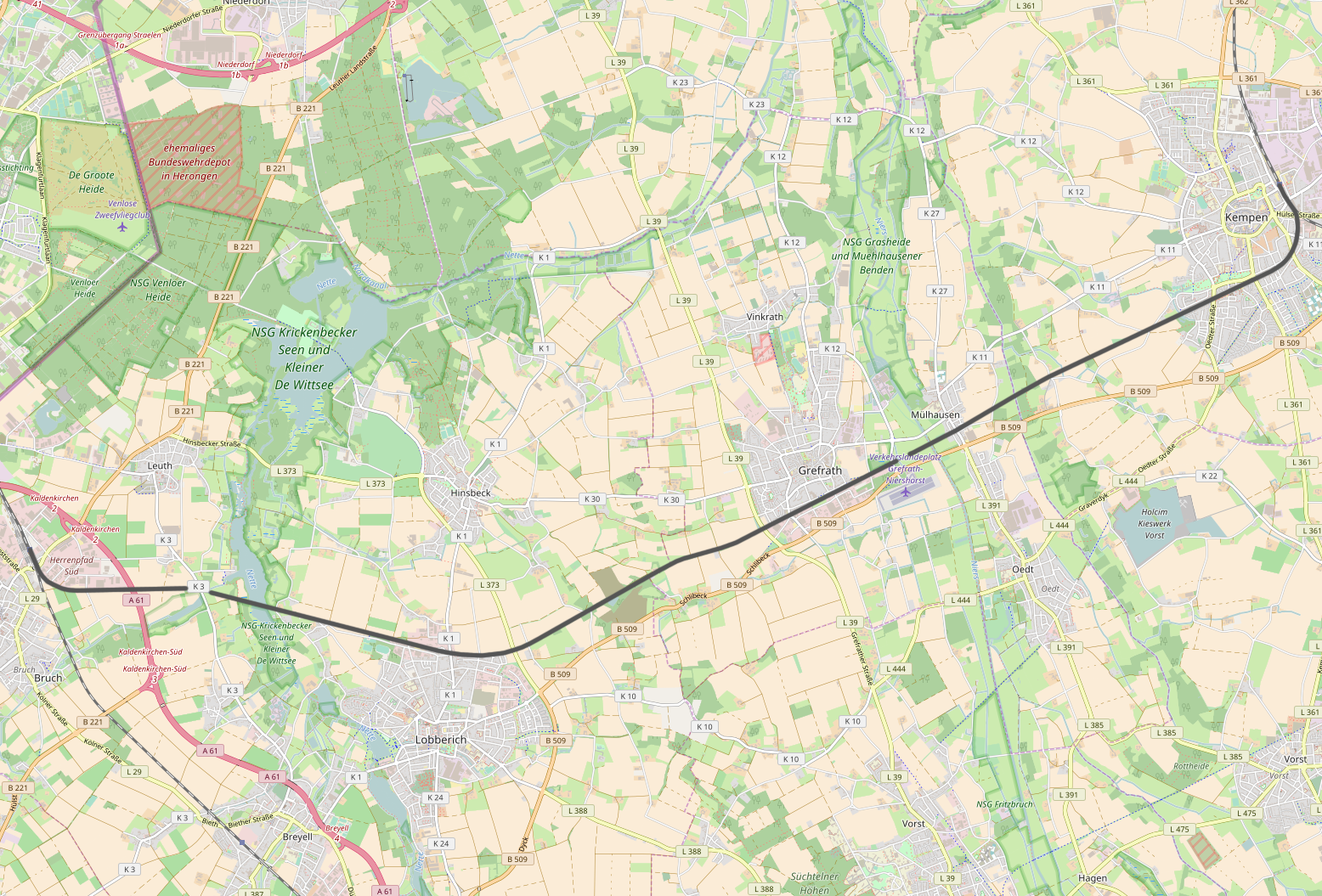

Overview
- Line number: 2512 (Germany)
- Locale: North Rhine-Westphalia, Germany

Service
- Route number: Last 474 (Germany)

Technical
- Track gauge: 1,435 mm (4 ft 8 1/2 in) standard gauge

The Kempen–Venlo railway was a former railway line from Kempen in the Lower Rhine region of the German state of North Rhine-Westphalia to Venlo in the Netherlands. It was of built by the Rhenish Railway Company (German: Rheinische Eisenbahn-Gesellschaft, RhE) and opened for freight on 23 December 1867 and for passenger traffic on 1 January 1868.

== History ==
In the mid-1860s there were three different routes considered for the railway line. Option A would have passed by the Krickenbeck lakes. Option B was planned as a line past Dorenburg castle (to the north of Grefrath) towards Hinsbeck and southeast of Leuth towards Kaldenkirchen. The realised route corresponded to the proposed option C. There were also considerations for a short time of building a branch line from Lobberich via Boisheim to Waldniel.

From Kaldenkirchen the line ran parallel to the Venlo–Viersen line of the Bergisch-Märkische Railway Company (Bergisch-Märkische Eisenbahn-Gesellschaft), so that both lines appeared to form a double-track line. Today, the remaining tracks on this section of the line are considered to form the Venlo–Viersen line.

After the end of operations, the section between Kempen and Grefrath was rebuilt as a cycle path. The remaining Grefrath-Kaldenkirchen section was also converted later.

=== Operations ===
Operations were initially carried out with locomotive-hauled trains, but from the early 1960s, as a result of increasing motorisation, services were operated by the so-called "saviour of branch lines", Uerdingen railbuses (class VT 95), which were eventually replaced by battery powered railcars of class 515. The track facilities in Grefrath and Lobberich were dismantled as far as possible. The station building in Lobberich was demolished 1976, Grefrath station now houses a youth club and Mulhouse station is currently used as a restaurant. After the abandonment of passenger services on the entire route on 22 May 1982 and the abandonment of freight between Kempen and Grefrath on 28 May 1983, there was still thriving freight traffic on the remaining Grefrath–Kaldenkirchen section (including Lobberich), but it was strongly restricted in the early 1990s and it was completely stopped on 31 December 1999.

Most of the class 290 diesel locomotives operated on weekdays to two private sidings, Lobbericher freight yard and the freight yard behind Grefrath station. The last passenger train that ran on the line between Lobberich and Kaldenkirchen was a special train which was used for shooting a film in 1991.
