= Jacob Reiners =

German painter

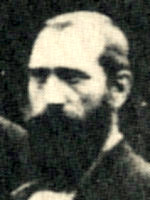
Jacob Reiners (date unknown)

Jacob (Jakob) Reiners (28 February 1828 – 17, 19 or 21 September 1907) was a German portrait, genre and landscape painter of the Düsseldorf school of painting.

== Life and career ==
Born in Lobberich on the Lower Rhine, Reiners was the son of the dyer Peter Jacob Reiners and the dyer Sybilla Catharina (née Kauertz). After his school days, he studied painting at the Kunstakademie Düsseldorf from 1847 to 1850 and became a master pupil of Wilhelm von Schadow and Karl Ferdinand Sohn. Other teachers were Joseph Wintergerst and Rudolf Wiegmann. In 1848, Reiners was one of the 112 co-founders of the Düsseldorf Malkasten. In addition to his artistic activities, he taught at a gymnasium.

Reiners was married to Theodora (née Aldenhoven). The couple had several children, among them the later art historian Heribert Reiners, who in 1909 dedicated the work Die rheinischen Chorgestühle der Frühgotik in Deutschland ein Kapitel der Rezeption der Gotik in Deutschland to his father's memory.

Reiners spent the last months of his life in Brühl, where he died in 1907 aged 79. He found his final resting place in the Lobberich cemetery. In honour of the Reiners family, a street was named after him in Lobberich. The Reinersstraße in Kempen, on the other hand, rather refers to the painter C(ornelius) A. Reiners, who received his confirmation in Lobberich in 1731; a relationship could not be proven.

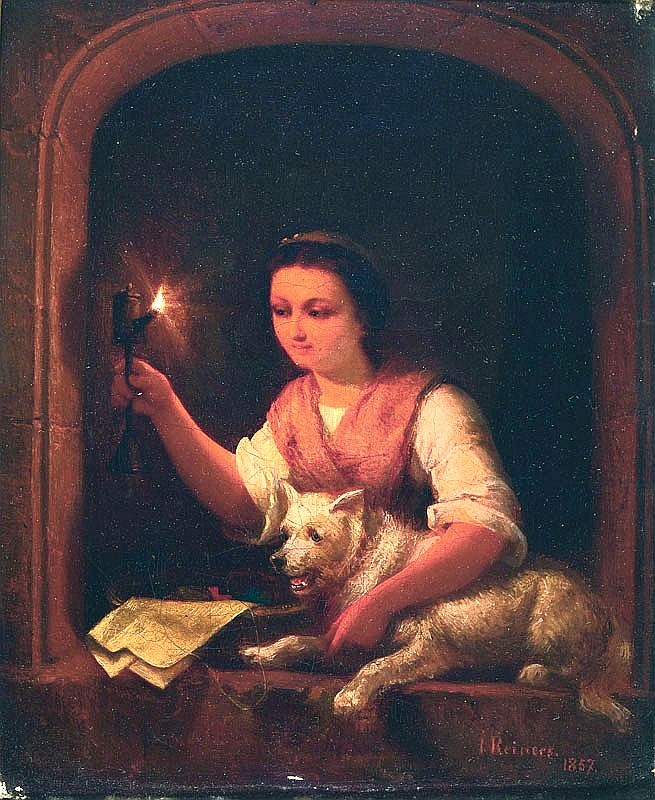
Young Woman with an Oil Lamp, 1857

Reiners died in Brühl aged 79.

== Work ==
Many of Reiners' works have not survived, but some can be found in relevant auction catalogues. The focus of his artistic work was portrait painting, especially in the area of the Rhenish and Westphalian nobility. In addition, he was engaged in Christian works. For example, he was largely responsible for the restoration of the altarpiece in the Lambertuskapelle in Eupen, the copy of the painting Assumption of Mary by Peter Paul Rubens made by an unknown artist. He also worked on moral painting, for example on the portrait Die Kartenlegerin, which is considered lost. He also painted interiors and atmospheric landscapes.
