= 230 Athamantis =

Main-belt asteroid

- VLT-SPHERE image of Athamantis

Discovery
- Discovered by: K. de Ball
- Discovery date: 3 September 1882

Designations
- Pronunciation: /æθəˈmæntɪs/
- Named after: Helle
- Alternative designations: 1949 WG
- Minor planet category: Main belt

Orbital characteristics
- Epoch 31 July 2016 (JD 2457600.5)
- Uncertainty parameter 0
- Observation arc: 133.58 yr (48791 d)
- Aphelion: 2.52818 AU (378.210 Gm)
- Perihelion: 2.23641 AU (334.562 Gm)
- Semi-major axis: 2.38229 AU (356.386 Gm)
- Eccentricity: 0.06124
- Orbital period (sidereal): 3.68 yr (1343.0 d)
- Average orbital speed: 19.3 km/s
- Mean anomaly: 116.2°
- Mean motion: 0° 16^{m} 4.969^{s} / day
- Inclination: 9.443°
- Longitude of ascending node: 239.9°
- Argument of perihelion: 139.1°

Physical characteristics
- Dimensions: 136 × 120 × 103 km (± 9 × 7 × 7 km)
- Mean diameter: 118±2 km
- Mass: (1.98±0.16)×10^{18} kg (Note: Calculated from its standard gravitational parameter GM = 0.132±0.011 km^{3}/s^{2}.)
- Mean density: 2.31±0.22 g/cm^{3}
- Synodic rotation period: 23.98475±0.00001 h
- Axial tilt: 18°
- Pole ecliptic longitude: 111° ± 2°
- Pole ecliptic latitude: 66° ± 2°
- Geometric albedo: 0.146 (calculated); 0.164±0.029
- Spectral type: S
- Absolute magnitude (H): 7.43; 7.35

230 Athamantis is a fairly large main-belt asteroid that was discovered by the German-Austrian astronomer K. de Ball on September 3, 1882, in Bothkamp. It was his only asteroid discovery. The asteroid was named after Athamantis, daughter of Athamas the mythical Greek king of Orchomenus.

Photometric observations of this asteroid gave a light curve with a period of 23.99 hours and a brightness variation of more than 0.20 in magnitude. It has the spectrum of an S-type asteroid. During 1991, the asteroid was observed occulting a star. The resulting chords provided a cross-section diameter estimate of 101.8 km.

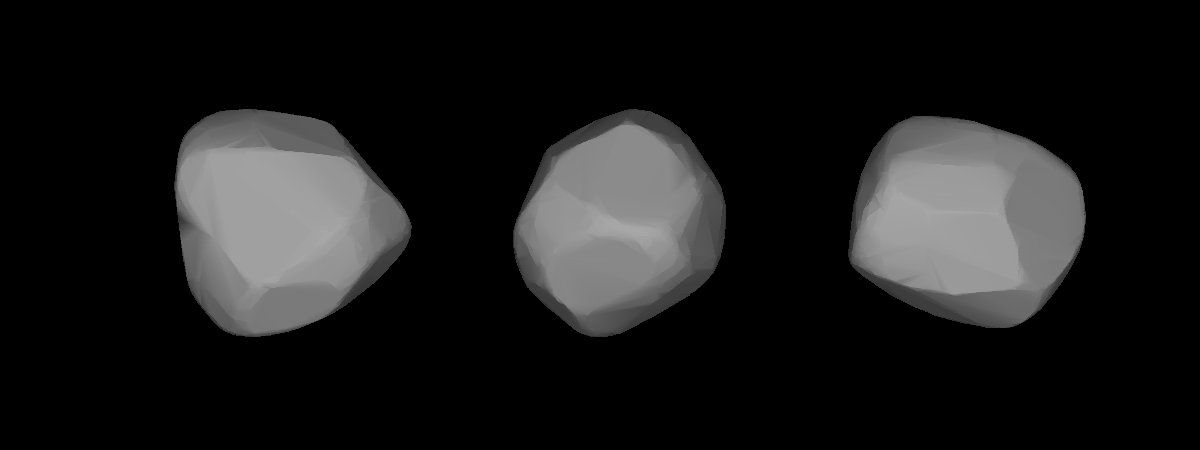
A three-dimensional model of 230 Athamantis based on its light curve
