= Heribert Reiners =

German art historian

Heribert Reiners (23 August 1884 – 4 June 1960) was a German art historian and academic teacher at the Universities in Bonn and Fribourg.

== Life ==
Born in Lobberich as son of the portrait painter Jacob Reiners and his wife Theodora Reiners, née Aldenhoven, Reiners, a Catholic born in the Rhineland, Reiners began studying art history after attending the Gymnasium Paulinum in Münster, from which he graduated on 11 March 1903. Initially, he spent the summer semester of 1903 at the Philipps-Universität Marburg, then moved to the Rhenish Friedrich Wilhelm University of Bonn (winter semester 1903 and summer semester 1904) and finally to Humboldt University of Berlin for the winter semester 1905 and summer semester 1906, before returning to Bonn for the summer semester 1907. He interrupted his studies in art history by studying Catholic Theology for two semesters in the winter semester of 1904 and the summer semester of 1905, also in Bonn. After the oral doctoral examination of 3 June 1908, he gained his Dr. phil. on 17 February 1909 at the University of Bonn with the thesis Die rheinischen Chorgestühle der Frühgotik. Paul Clemen emerged as his doctoral supervisor.

In Bonn, Reiners habilitated also in 1912. During the First World War he was, together with Dr Wilhelm Ewald, art protection officer at the Army High Command 5 and documented Romanesque, Gothic and Renaissance churches and castles in northern Lorraine. In 1922, he received an extraordinary Professorship. From Bonn he moved to the University of Fribourg in Switzerland in 1925, after receiving an appointment there as full professor to the chair of art history, which he held until 1945, from 1940 also for the subject of archaeology.

With the end of the Second World War and the simultaneous end of the National Socialist era, Reiners received expulsion by decision of the Swiss Federal Council for collaborationism with the Nazis. The decision was repealed in 1957.

Reiners died in Bodman-Ludwigshafen at the age of 75.

== Monument inventory in the Rhine Province ==
Reiners worked from 1 August 1908 to 1 October 1909 for the Bonn-based Commission for Monument Statistics, which was commissioned by the Provincial Association of the Rhine Province under Paul Clemen to help compile the publication series Die Kunstdenkmäler der Rheinprovinz. During this period, he travelled through the district of Aachen for the purpose of recording the works of art and monuments there. After his departure, he continued editing the volume, which appeared in print in 1912. In 1931, he finally also took over from Karl Faymonville, who died in 1930, his as yet unpublished editing of the partial volume on the district of Malmedy. After a complete reworking and retracing of the district and, in parallel, of the adjacent district of Eupen, which had been published for the first time in 1912 in a partial volume by Faymonville, in 1932 and 1933, the double volume Die Kunstdenkmäler von Eupen-Malmedy (The Art Monuments of Eupen-Malmedy) on the districts separated from Germany after World War I was published in 1935. Reiners also contributed to other writings under the direction of Paul Clemen. For example, in the first edition of the guidebook Schloß Burg an der Wupper published by Schwann in Düsseldorf in 1910, for which he wrote the description of the picturesque decoration.

== Publications ==
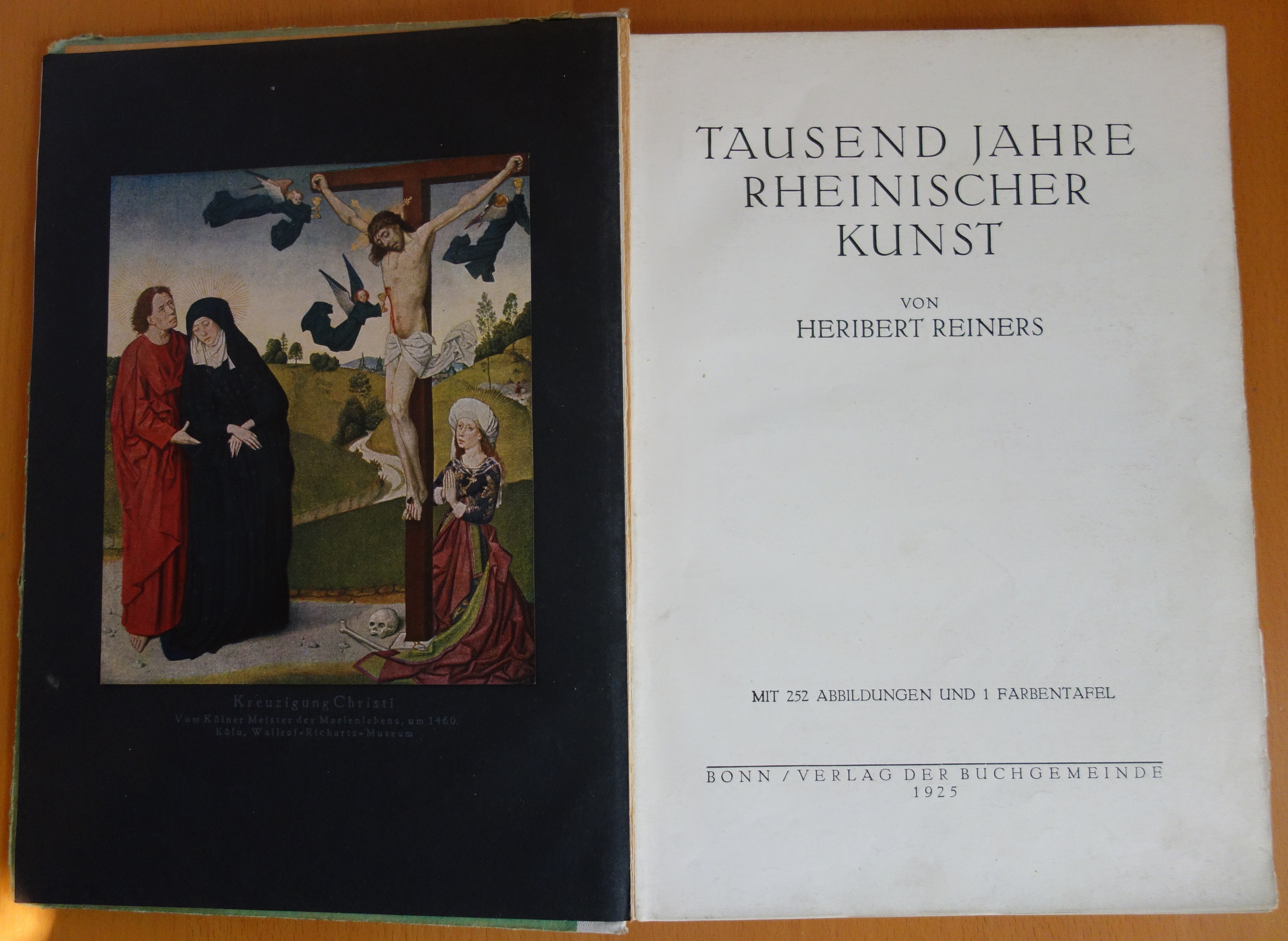
Title page of Tausend Jahre rheinischer Kunst, Bonn 1925

- Die rheinischen Chorgestühle der Frühgotik. Ein Kapitel der Rezeption der Gotik in Deutschland. Dissertation, Universität Bonn vom 17 Februar 1909, Universitäts-Buchdruckerei J. H. Ed. Heitz (Heitz & Mündel), Strassburg 1909.
- Die rheinischen Chorgestühle der Frühgotik. Ein Kapitel der Rezeption der Gotik in Deutschland. (Studien zur deutschen Kunstgeschichte, 113th fascicule) J. H. Ed. Heitz (Heitz & Mündel), Strassburg 1909, 90 pages plus 29 panels.
- Die Kunstdenkmäler des Landkreises Aachen. (Paul Clemen: Die Kunstdenkmäler der Rheinprovinz. ninth volume II.) L. Schwann Verlag, Düsseldorf 1912 (Nachdruck Pädagogischer Verlag Schwann, Düsseldorf 1981, ISBN 3-590-32111-3).
- Die Kunst in den Rheinlanden. Kühlen, Mönchengladbach 1921.
- Kunstdenkmäler zwischen Maas und Mosel, with Wilhelm Ewald, on behalf of the Armee-Oberkommandos 5, Verlag F. Bruckmann, Munich 1919
- Das malerische alte Freiburg-Schweiz. Dr. B. Filser, Augsburg 1930
- Tausend Jahre rheinischer Kunst. Verlag der Buchgemeinde, Bonn 1925 (3rd edition 1938).
- in collaboration with Heinrich Neu: Die Kunstdenkmäler von Eupen–Malmedy. L. Schwann Verlag, Düsseldorf 1935 (Nachdruck Pädagogischer Verlag Schwann, Düsseldorf 1982, ISBN 3-590-32117-2).
- Das Münster Unserer Lieben Frau zu Konstanz. (Die Kunstdenkmäler Südbadens, vol.1), Thorbecke, Konstanz 1955.
