= Nettetal =

- Town
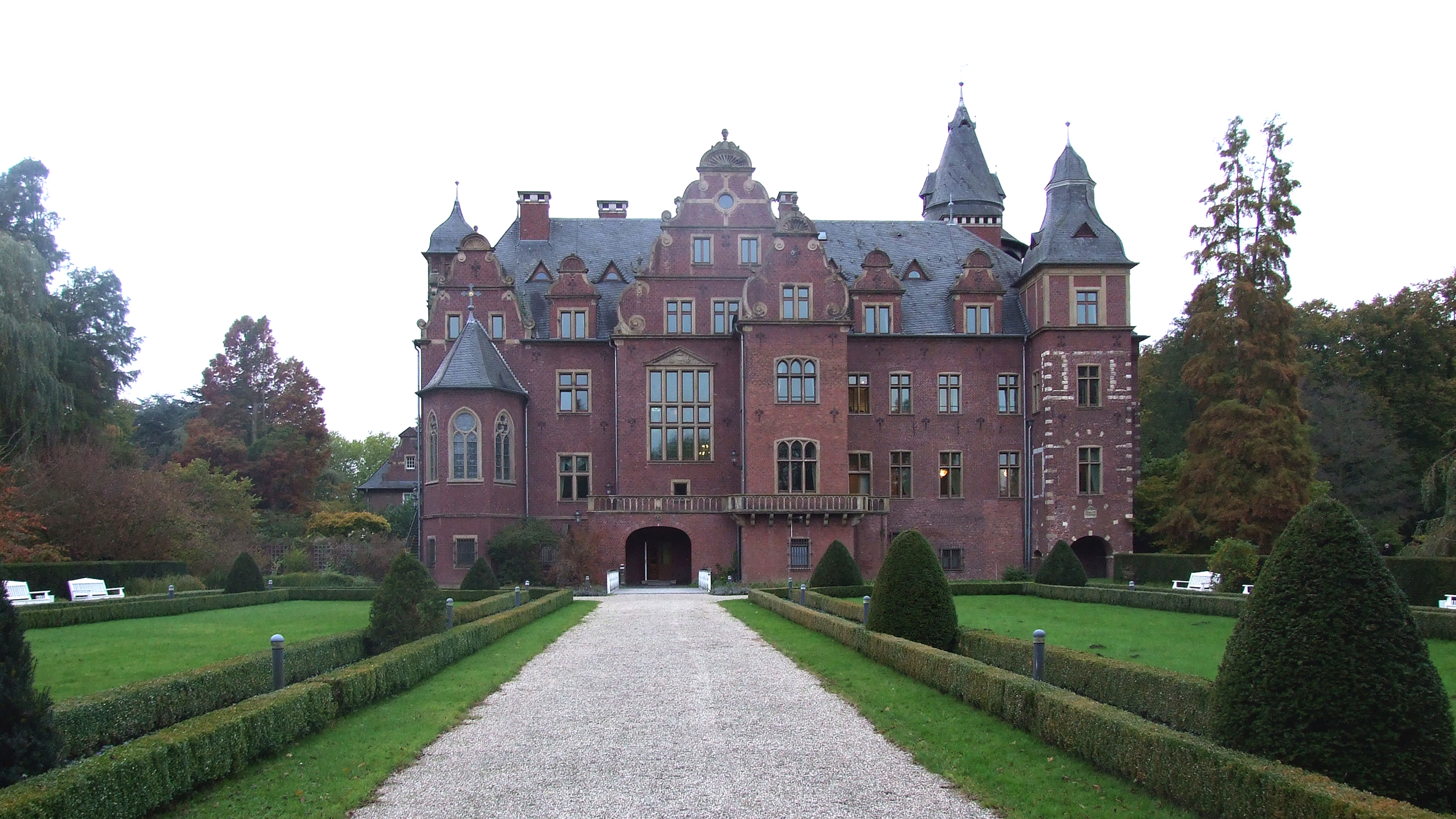
- Krickenbeck Castle

- Coat of arms

- Location of Nettetal within Viersen district
- Interactive map of Nettetal
- Location within Germany Location within North Rhine-Westphalia
- Coordinates: 51°19′N 6°17′E
- Country: Germany
- State: North Rhine-Westphalia
- Admin. region: Düsseldorf
- District: Viersen
- Founded: 1970
- Subdivisions: 6 boroughs

Government
  - Mayor (2020–25): Christian Küsters

Area
  - Total: 83.87 km^{2} (32.38 sq mi)
- Elevation: 38 m (125 ft)

Population (2025-12-31)
  - Total: 41,711
  - Density: 497.3/km^{2} (1,288/sq mi)
- Time zone: UTC+01:00 (CET)
  - Summer (DST): UTC+02:00 (CEST)
- Postal codes: 41334
- Dialling codes: 02153, 02157, 02158
- Vehicle registration: VIE, KK
- Website: www.nettetal.de

Nettetal (German pronunciation: [ˈnɛtətaːl], lit. 'Nette Valley') is a town in the district of Viersen, North Rhine-Westphalia, Germany. It is situated in the Lower Rhine region.

== History ==
Coat of arms

Nettetal was founded on January 1, 1970, when the former townships Leuth, Breyell, Hinsbeck and former towns/cities Lobberich and Kaldenkirchen were merged. All five communities had developed around the river Nette.

Lobberich, Hinsbeck, and Leuth belonged historically to the Upper Quarter of Guelders and thus to the Southern Netherlands. During the War of the Spanish Succession, these places were occupied by Prussia, along with the other municipalities that went on to form Prussian Upper Guelders in 1713.

Kaldenkirchen, Breyell and Schaag, on the other hand, historically belonged to the Duchy of Jülich.

Nettetal originally contained five boroughs, until Schaag separated from Breyell in 1995, becoming the sixth borough.

At the time of its formation, it was considered too problematic to try and combine all five coats of arms into one, so a new coat of arm was introduced in 1971. It shows a water lily before a blue blackground, symbolizing the predominance of nature and the variety of lakes. Five water lily leaves represent the five founding boroughs of Nettetal.

== Dialect ==
The dialect originally spoken in Hinsbeck (and in the entire municipality of Nettetal) lies on the dividing line between Kleverlandish and South Low Franconian, which is almost identical to the Limburgish dialect spoken in nearby Netherlands.

== Demographics ==
Boroughs of Nettetal

Historical population

Year	Pop.	±% p.a.
1965	34,312	—
1970	36,838	+1.43%
1975	37,386	+0.30%
1980	37,302	−0.04%
1985	37,028	−0.15%
1990	38,820	+0.95%
1995	40,348	+0.78%

Year	Pop.	±% p.a.
2000	41,871	+0.74%
2005	42,434	+0.27%
2010	41,736	−0.33%
2015	41,964	+0.11%
2020	42,438	+0.22%
2025	41,711	−0.34%

Source: Landesdatabank Nordrhein-Westfalen

Nettetal's six boroughs, with populations per its own census, as of December 2020:

Borough	Population	Area (km^{2})
Lobberich	14,067	17.64
Kaldenkirchen	10,025	15.24
Breyell	8,589	11.85
Hinsbeck	4,632	18.98
Schaag	3,741	6.95
Leuth	1,796	13.21
Total Nettetal	42,850	83.87

== Geography ==
Nettetal is located in the middle of the cross-border Maas-Schwalm-Nette Nature Park, along the border with the Netherlands (the northwest edges of Kaldenkirchen and Leuth touch the border), approximately 20 km (12 mi) north-west of Mönchengladbach, Germany, and 10 km (6.2 mi) south-east of Venlo, Netherlands. The Jenische, large number of a local minority lives nearby in the area.

In addition to the river Nette, peat mining from the 16th to the 19th century has resulted in the formation of twelve lakes in the municipality.

The Nette, broad forest, heath areas and lakes (see next section) make Nettetal a central resort in the Maas-Schwalm-Nette Nature Park.

=== Lakes ===
Nettetal features 12 lakes, with a combined area of 179 hectares (440 acres).

Fed by the Nette:

- Kleiner Breyeller See (5.3 ha)
- Großer Breyeller See (9.2 ha)
- Nettebruch (13.2 ha)
- Windmühlenbruch (6 ha)
- Ferkensbruch (4.5 ha)
- Kleiner de Wittsee (4.5 ha)
- Großer de Wittsee (22.5 ha)
- Schrolik (15.5 ha)
- Poelvennsee (24.5 ha)

Fed by the Nette's Renne tributary:

- Hinsbecker Bruch (37.5 ha)
- Glabbacher Bruch (36 ha)

Fed by the Nette's Königsbach tributary:

- Kälberweide (5 ha)

== Sights ==
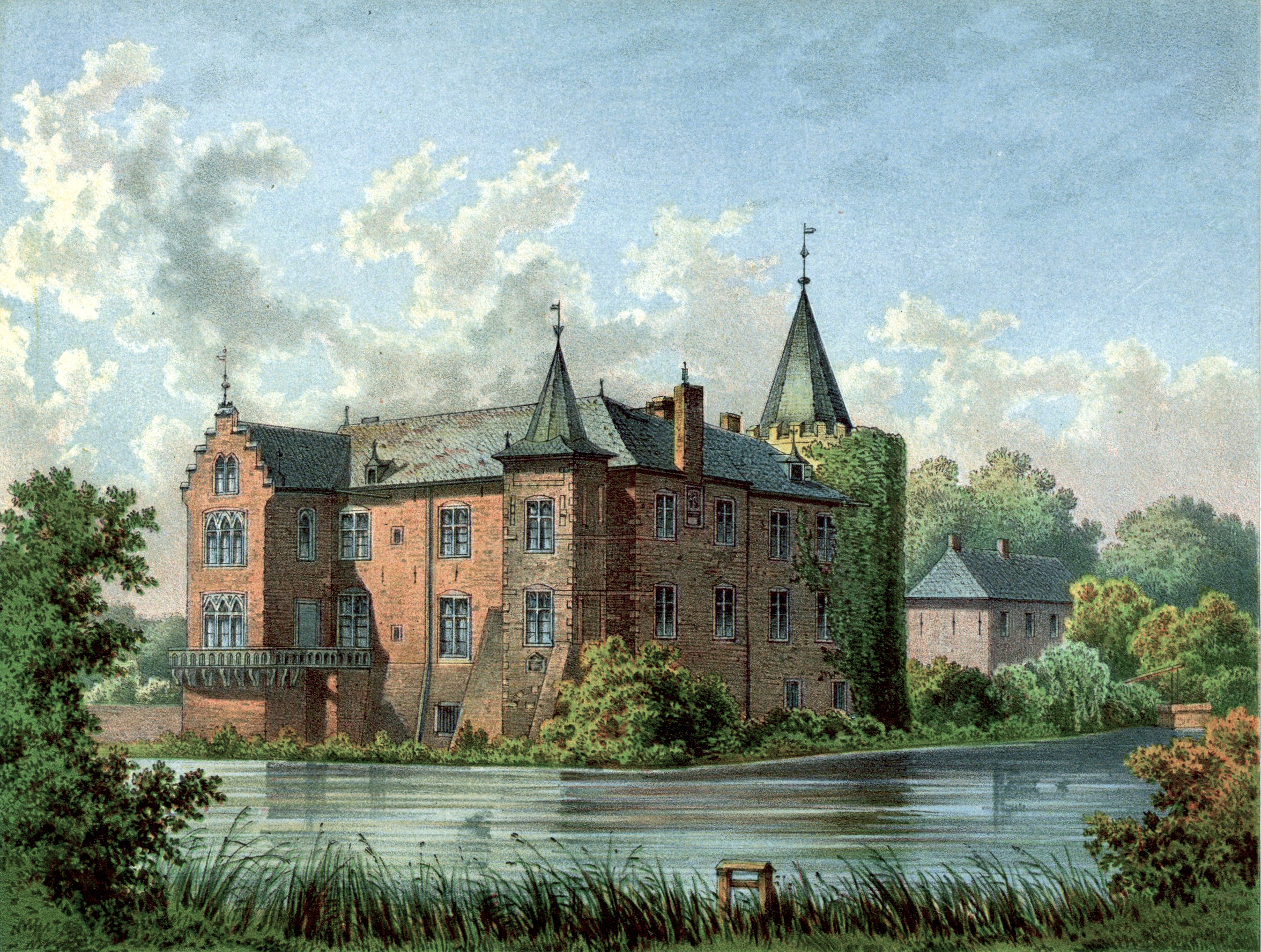
Krickenbeck Castle (c. 1857 – c. 1883)

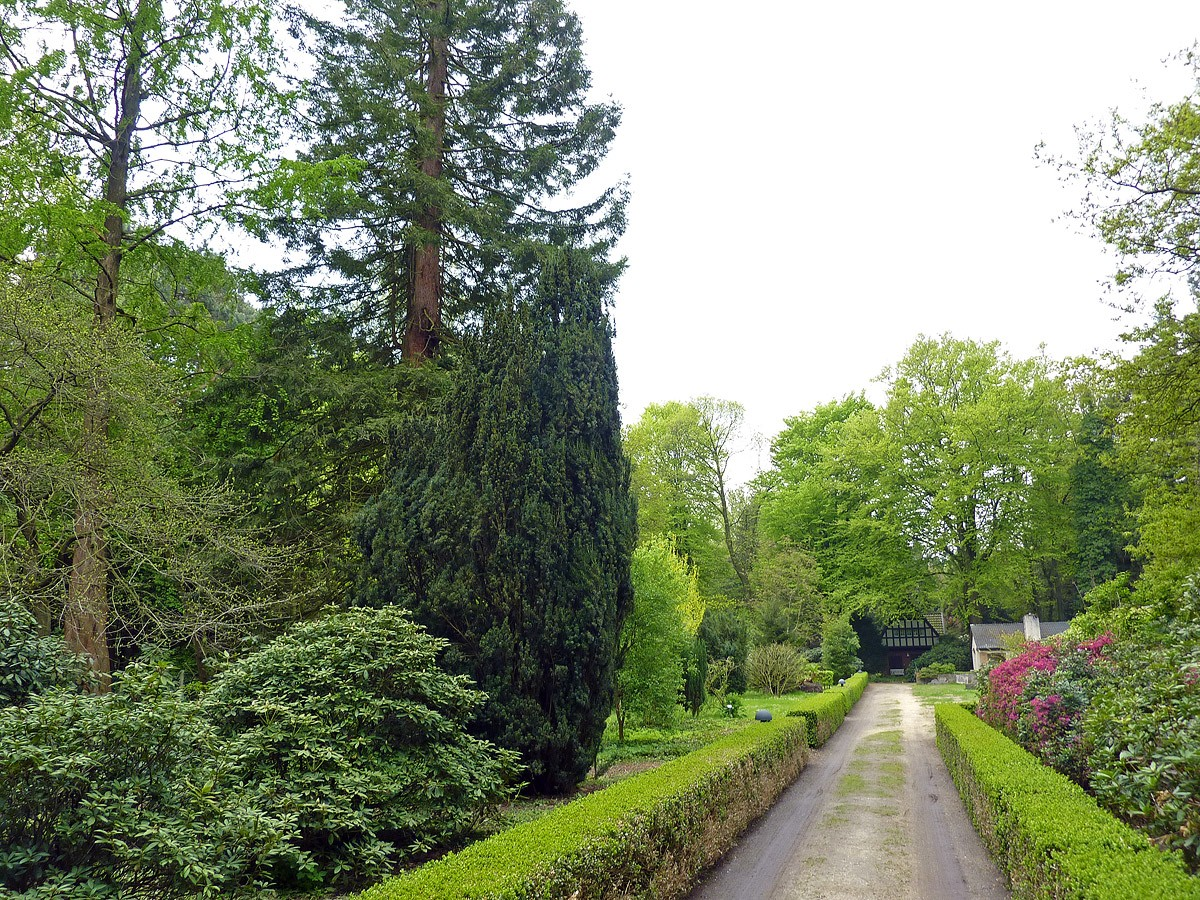
Kaldenkirchen Sequoia Farm (2010)

- The 11th century Krickenbeck Castle and its park, set in the Leuth borough, surrounded by the Hinsbecker Bruch, Glabbacher Bruch, Schrolik and Poelvennsee lakes
- The Kaldenkirchen Sequoia Farm, in the Kaldenkirchen borough, an arboretum with Giant Sequoias and more than 400 other varieties of trees, part of the "Protected area of Maas-Schwalm-Nette"
- A portion of the 100 km-long (62 mi) Fietsallee am Nordkanal, an international long-distance cycling route between Neuss, Germany, and Nederweert, Netherlands
- The 11.2 km-long (7.0 mi) Galgenvenn hiking trail, voted "Germany's second most beautiful hiking trail" in 2016

== Twin towns – sister cities ==
Nettetal is twinned with:

- Ełk, Poland
- Fenland, England, United Kingdom
- Rives-en-Seine, France

== Notable people ==
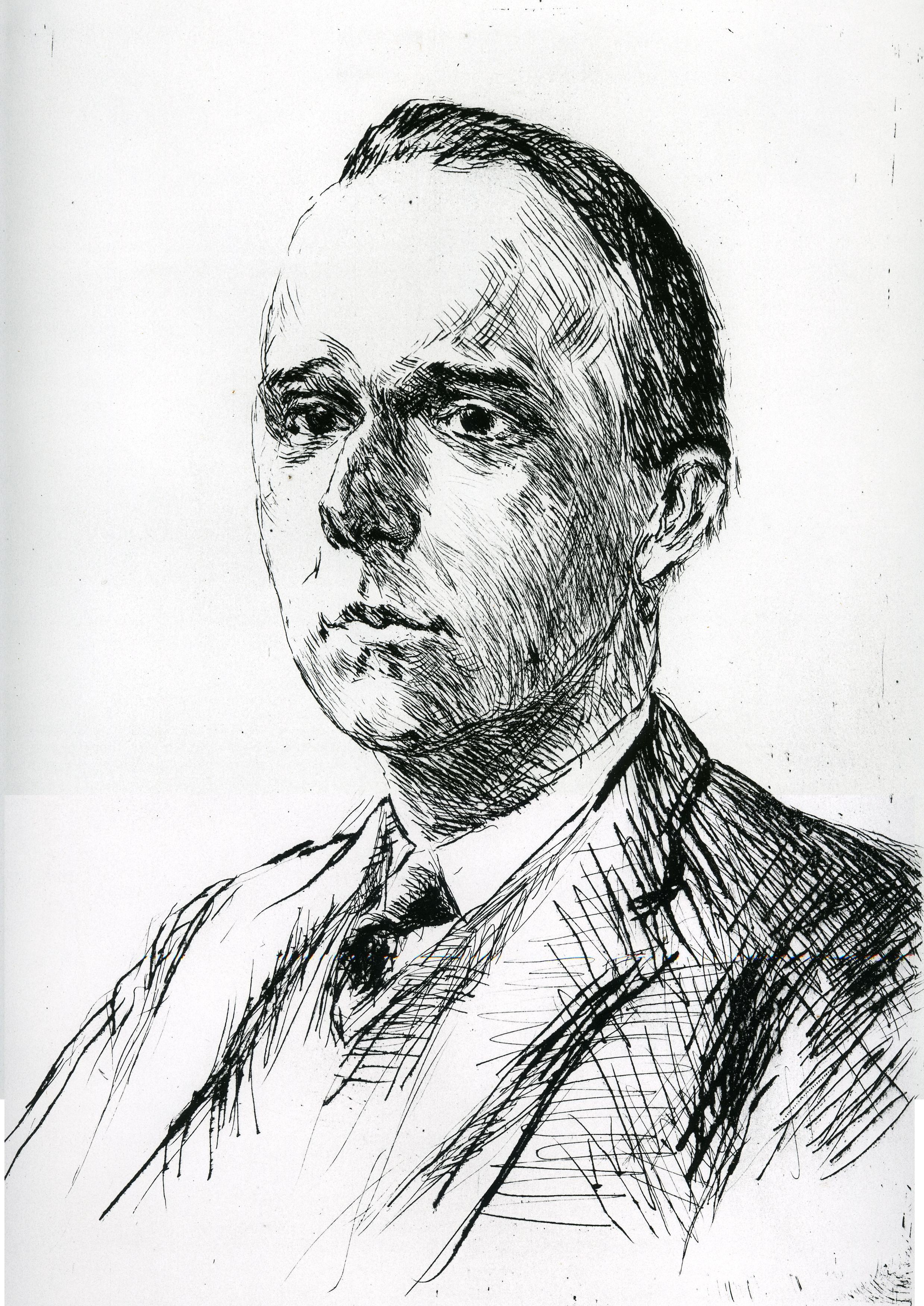
Werner Jaeger 1915

- Leo Anton Karl de Ball (1853–1916), German-Austrian astronomer
- Werner Jaeger (1888–1961), classicist
- Michael Hardt (born 1951), designer
- Sascha Lappessen (born 1970), DJ and bandleader
- Tuğrul Erat (born 1992), Azerbaijani footballer
