= Leuth (Germany) =

Coordinates: 51°20′N 6°13′E

Leuth (German pronunciation: [ˈlɔʏt]) is a village in North Rhine-Westphalia on the Dutch border in the district of Viersen. It is the smallest part of the municipality of Nettetal and has approximately 2000 inhabitants. Its historical origin lies in the early Middle Ages (before the year 1000).

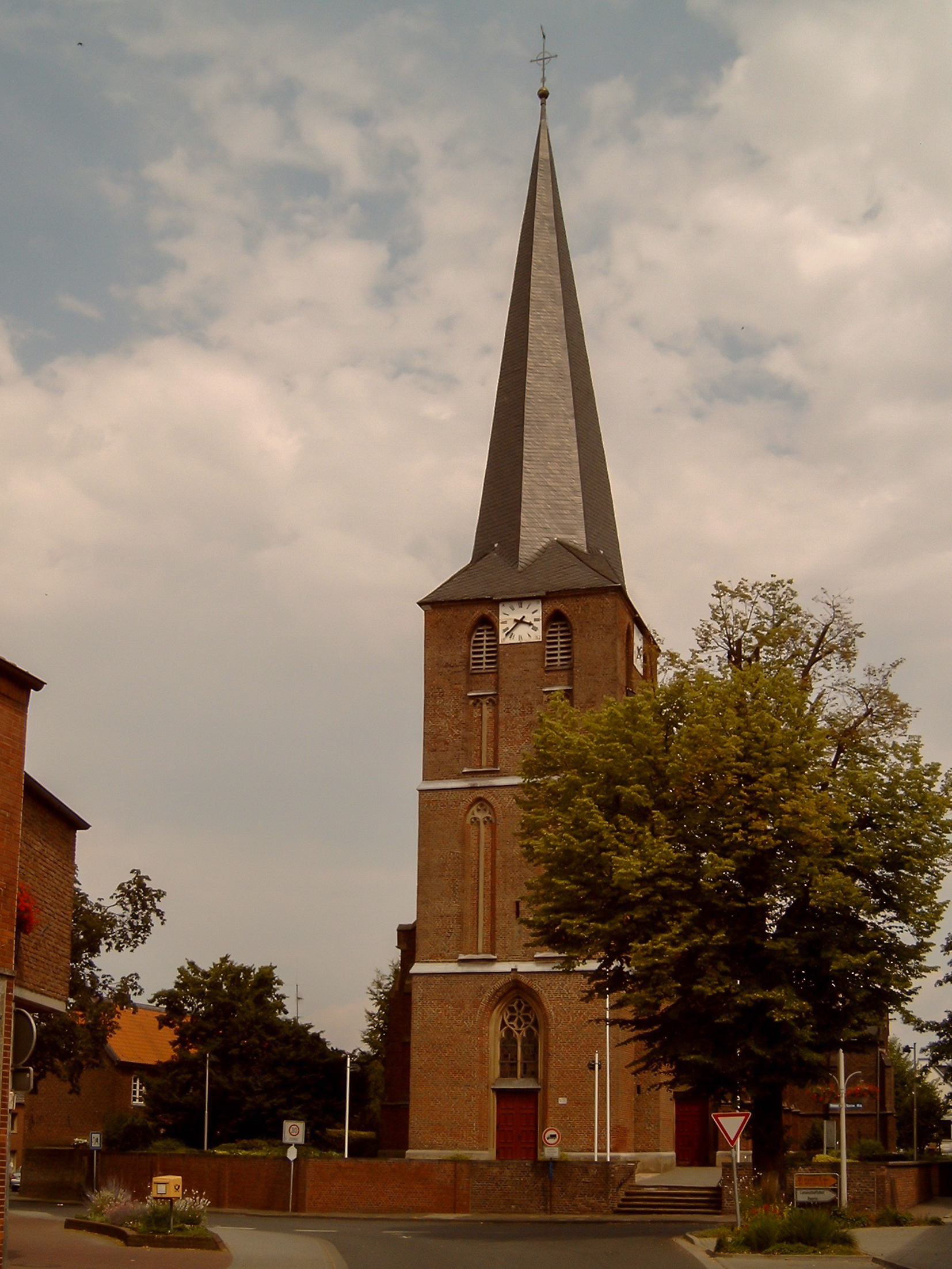

== See also ==
- Nettetal
- Viersen
- Lobberich
