= Bothkamp =

- Municipality
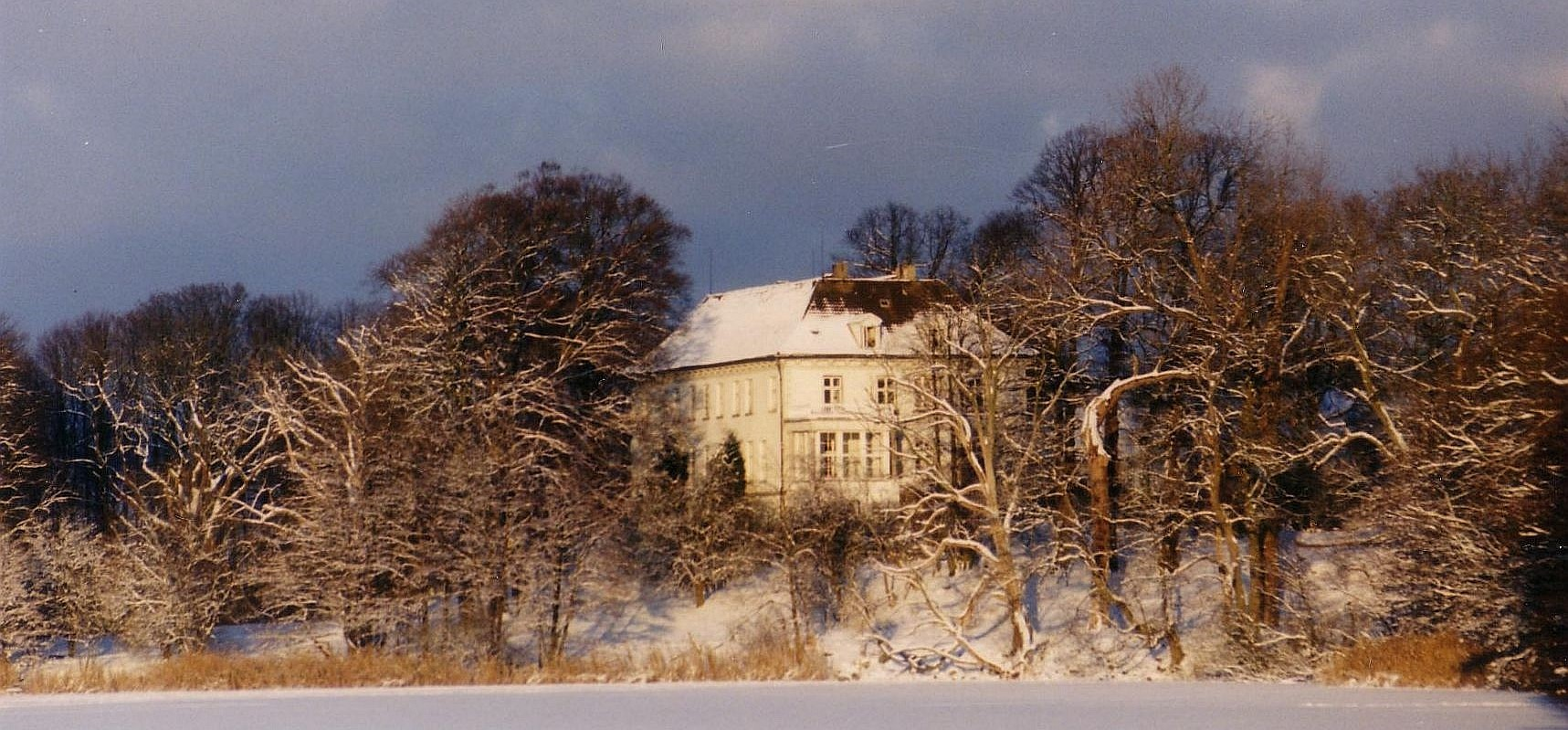
- Bothkamp Manor

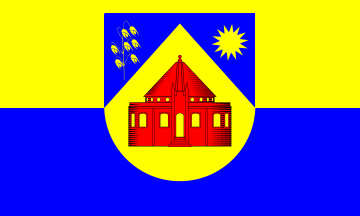
- Flag Coat of arms

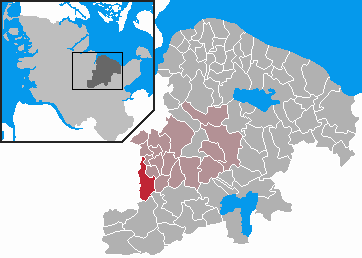
- Location of Bothkamp within Plön district
- Interactive map of Bothkamp
- Location within Germany Location within Schleswig-Holstein
- Coordinates: 54°12′N 10°7′E
- Country: Germany
- State: Schleswig-Holstein
- District: Plön
- Municipal assoc.: Preetz-Land

Government
  - Mayor: Klaus Jensen

Area
  - Total: 13.80 km^{2} (5.33 sq mi)
- Elevation: 28 m (92 ft)

Population (2025-12-31)
  - Total: 252
  - Density: 18.3/km^{2} (47.3/sq mi)
- Time zone: UTC+01:00 (CET)
  - Summer (DST): UTC+02:00 (CEST)
- Postal codes: 24250
- Dialling codes: 04302
- Vehicle registration: PLÖ
- Website: www.amtpreetzland.de

Bothkamp is a municipality in the district of Plön, in Schleswig-Holstein, Germany.
