= Lobberich =

German village

Coordinates: 51°18′N 6°16′E

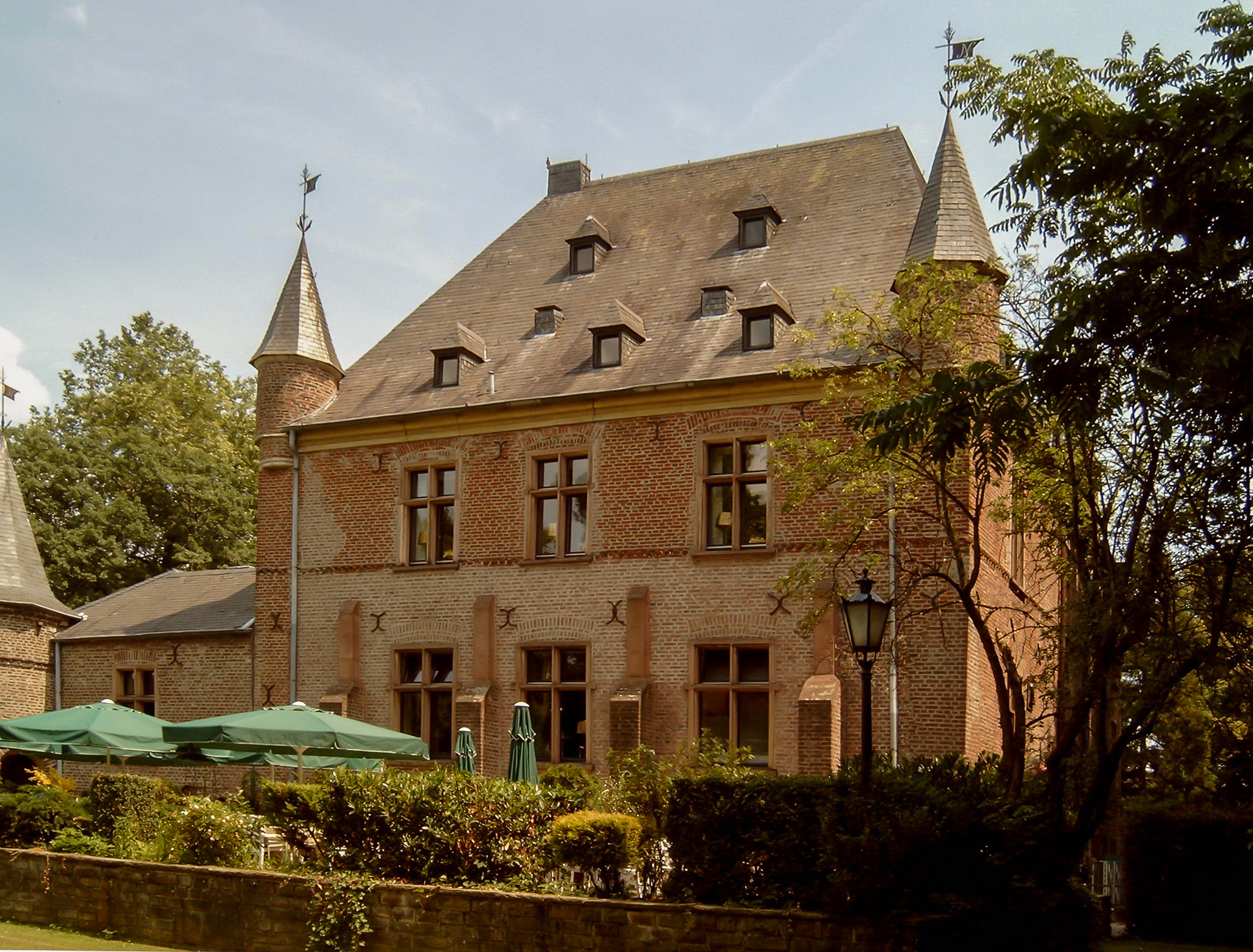
Lobberich, manor house

Lobberich (German pronunciation: [ˈlɔbəʁɪç]) is a German village in North Rhine-Westphalia, situated close to the Dutch border at Venlo. It has a population of around 14,000 inhabitants. Since 1970 the town belongs to the municipality of Nettetal. The art historian Heribert Reiners was born here in 1884.

== Overview ==
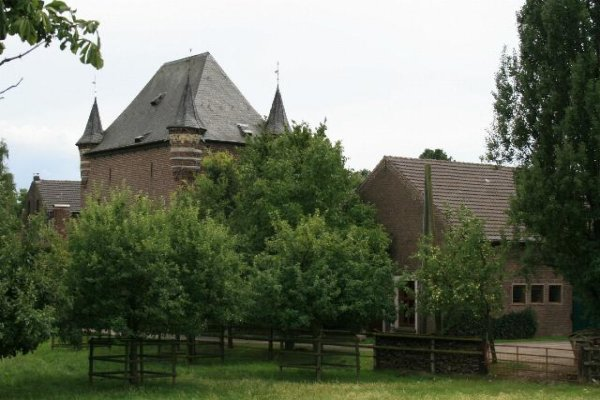
Bocholt Castle

Traditional industries are textiles and mechanical engineering, other products from Lobberich included Rokal model railways and Niedieck velvet.

== Notable persons ==
- 1969: Marcus Optendrenk, German politician

== See also ==
- Leuth
- Kaldenkirchen
- Nettetal
