= Viersen–Venlo railway =

Railway line in Germany and the Netherlands

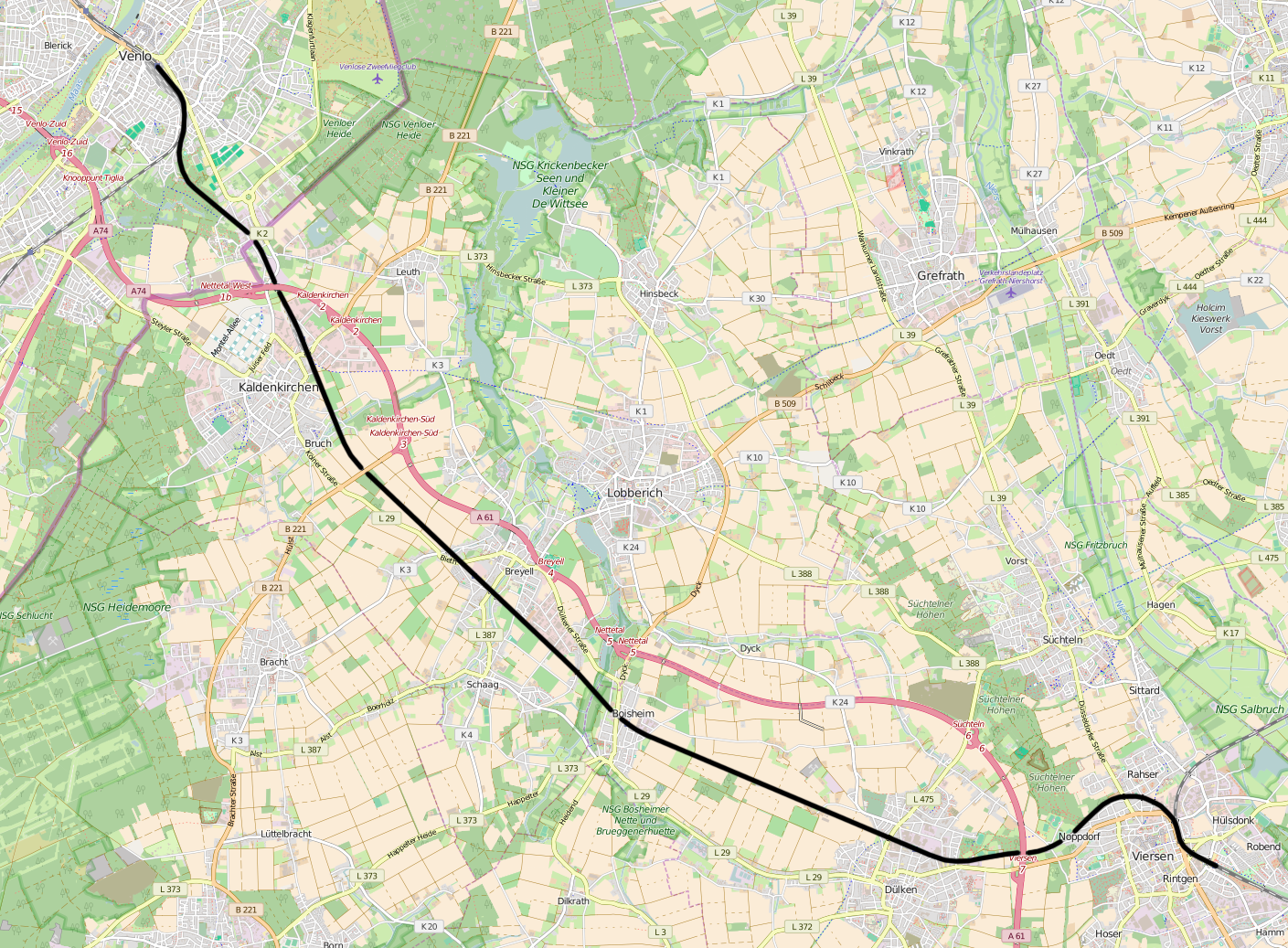

Overview
- Status: Operational
- Owner: Deutsche Bahn
- Locale: The Netherlands and Germany
- Termini: Viersen station; Venlo railway station

Service
- Operator(s): DB Netz

History
- Opened: 1866

Technical
- Line length: 23 km (14 mi)
- Number of tracks: double track (Viersen–Dülken), single track (Dülken–Kaldenkirchen), double track (Kaldenkirchen–Venlo)
- Track gauge: 1,435 mm (4 ft 8 1/2 in) standard gauge
- Electrification: 15 kV AC

The Viersen–Venlo railway is a railway line running from Viersen in Germany to Venlo in the Netherlands. The line was opened in 1866 by the Bergisch-Märkische Railway Company. Formerly used by international passenger trains between The Hague and Cologne, it is now only used by the Maas-Wupper-Express service from Venlo to Hamm via Düsseldorf and Hagen. It is also an important link for freight transport.

== History ==
The line was built by the Bergisch-Märkische Railway Company (German: Bergisch-Märkische Eisenbahn-Gesellschaft, BME), following its acquisition of the Duisburg-Ruhrort–Mönchengladbach railway as part of its takeover of the Aachen-Düsseldorf-Ruhrort Railway Company on 1 January 1866.

The first section from Viersen to Kaldenkirchen was opened on 29 January 1866 and this was followed by the opening of the second section from Kaldenkirchen to Venlo on 29 October 1866.

In parallel with the building of this line, the Rhenish Railway Company (Rheinische Eisenbahn-Gesellschaft, RHE) built its own line from Kempen via Kaldenkirchen to Venlo, which it opened on 23 December 1867.

The route was previously used by international long-distance traffic, including some “D-trains” (D-Züge: long-distance expresses) to Hoek van Holland Haven (Hook of Holland Harbour) and the Rheingold.

== Current situation ==
Since the closing of the main line to Kempen, the Rhenish track between Kaldenkirchen and Venlo has served as the second track of the Viersen–Venlo line. Between Dülken and Kaldenkirchen the line is single track only along a length of about 13 km. The installation of overhead electrification was completed on the full length of the line on 22 May 1968.

== Operations ==
Today the only regular passenger services that operates on the line is Regional-Express service RE 13 (Maas-Wupper-Express ) and a pair of trains operating as the Rhein-Erft-Express (RE 8) on the Kaldenkirchen–Köln Messe/Deutz line, which stop at every station of the route. The Maas-Wupper-Express has been operated hourly since 13 December 2009 by Eurobahn. This subsidiary of Keolis contracted to operate the RE 13 for 16 years with modern Stadler FLIRT electrical multiple units. Previously it had been operated by DB Regio NRW with locomotive-hauled push–pull trains consisting of class 111 locomotives and five n-coaches (refurbished Silberling carriages). Due to lack of approvals for the operation of the FLIRT sets from the German and Dutch regulatory authorities, services initially continued to be operated by locomotive-hauled push-pull trains between Mönchengladbach and Venlo. Meanwhile, the FLIRT sets ran only to Kaldenkirchen and were supplemented by a short shuttle of class 111 series with three n-coaches to Venlo. Since the end of July 2010 until further notice, Eurobahn has operated four carriage FLIRT sets between Venlo and Monchengladbach and five carriage FLIRT sets between Monchengladbach and Hamm.

The route is also used by many freight trains between Germany and the Netherlands and Belgium.

== Stations ==
The main interchange stations on the Viersen–Venlo railway are:

- Viersen: to Mönchengladbach, Düsseldorf and Duisburg
- Venlo: to Roermond, Maastricht, Eindhoven and Nijmegen
