= Maas-Wupper-Express =

RE 13 Maas-Wupper-Express
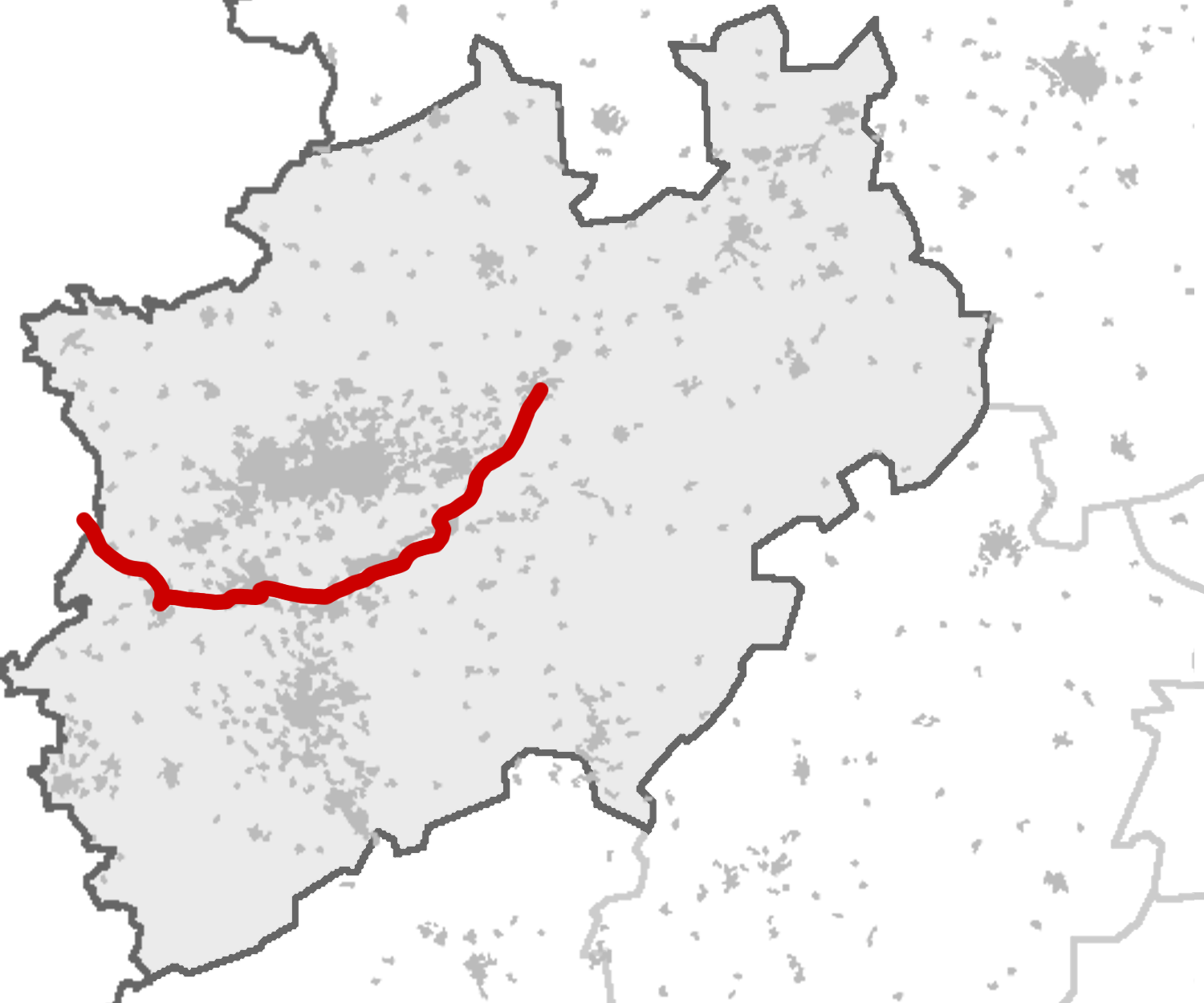

Overview
- Owner: VRR
- Line number: RE 13
- Locale: North Rhine-Westphalia, Germany and Limburg, Netherlands

Service
- Route number: 485 (Venlo–Hagen); 455 (Wuppertal–Hamm)
- Operator(s): eurobahn

Technical
- Line length: 160 km (99 mi)
- Operating speed: 160 km/h (99 mph) (maximum)

The Maas-Wupper-Express (RE 13) is a Regional-Express service in the German state of North Rhine-Westphalia (NRW), running from the Dutch border town of Venlo to Hamm in Westphalia.

== Route ==
Together with the Wupper-Express (RE 4) and Rhine-Ruhr S-Bahn line S 8, the Maas-Wupper-Express provides an east-west link between the lower Rhine of Germany and the eastern Ruhr.

It runs on the tracks of the Venlo–Viersen, Viersen-Mönchengladbach, Mönchengladbach–Düsseldorf, Düsseldorf–Wuppertal, Wuppertal–Hagen and Hagen–Hamm lines.

Trains running between Venlo and Hamm have to reverse in Mönchengladbach Hauptbahnhof, so the Maas-Wupper-Express is scheduled to spend nine minutes there on the way to Venlo and ten minutes towards Hamm.

In 2026 the current route will be extend towards the central station of the Dutch city Eindhoven, also stopping at Helmond, in a joint exploitation with Arriva Netherlands

== Operations ==
The operator of the line is Eurobahn, a subsidiary of Keolis. Operations on this line and the Rhein-Emscher-Express are carried out using 4 four-carriage and 14 five-carriage Stadler FLIRT electrical multiple units with a top speed of 160 km/h rented from Angel Trains. Services run every hour.

April 28 2025 Dutch Train Charter Services will run some services using DB Class 101 or DB Class 111 and 4 carrige N-Wagon train sets between Venlo and Mönchengladbach in the mornings and evenings and between Venlo and Wuppertal Hbf during the day

Timetable: https://www.eurobahn.de/fileadmin/dokumente/fahrplaene/2025/PLAKAT_ERB_RE13_Fplred_2804_1312.pdf

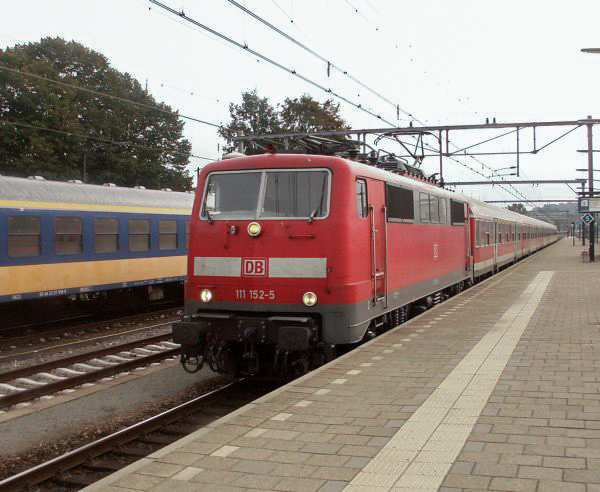
RE 13 in Venlo

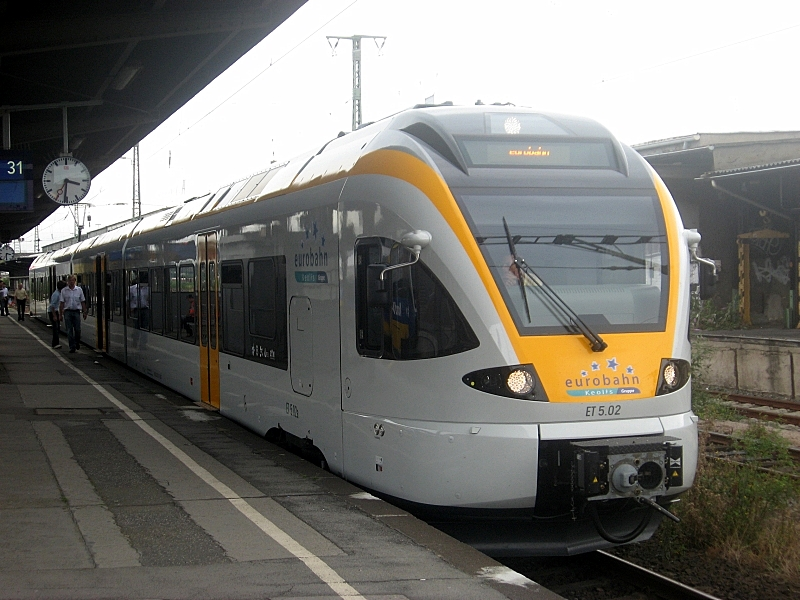
New FLIRT train

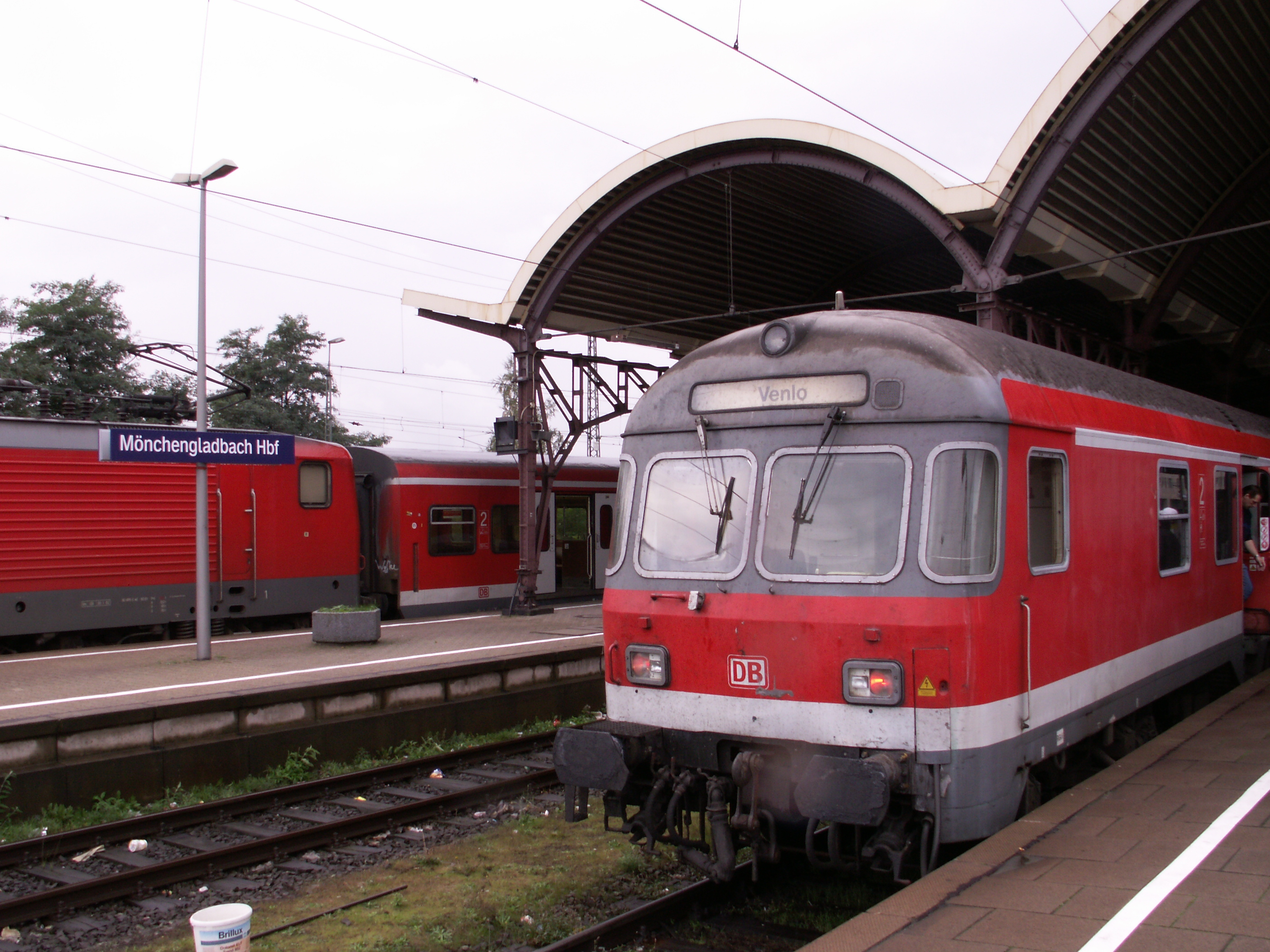
RE 13 in Mönchengladbach

== See also ==
- List of regional rail lines in North Rhine-Westphalia
- List of scheduled railway routes in Germany
