= Venlo railway station =

Railway station in the Netherlands

Venlo
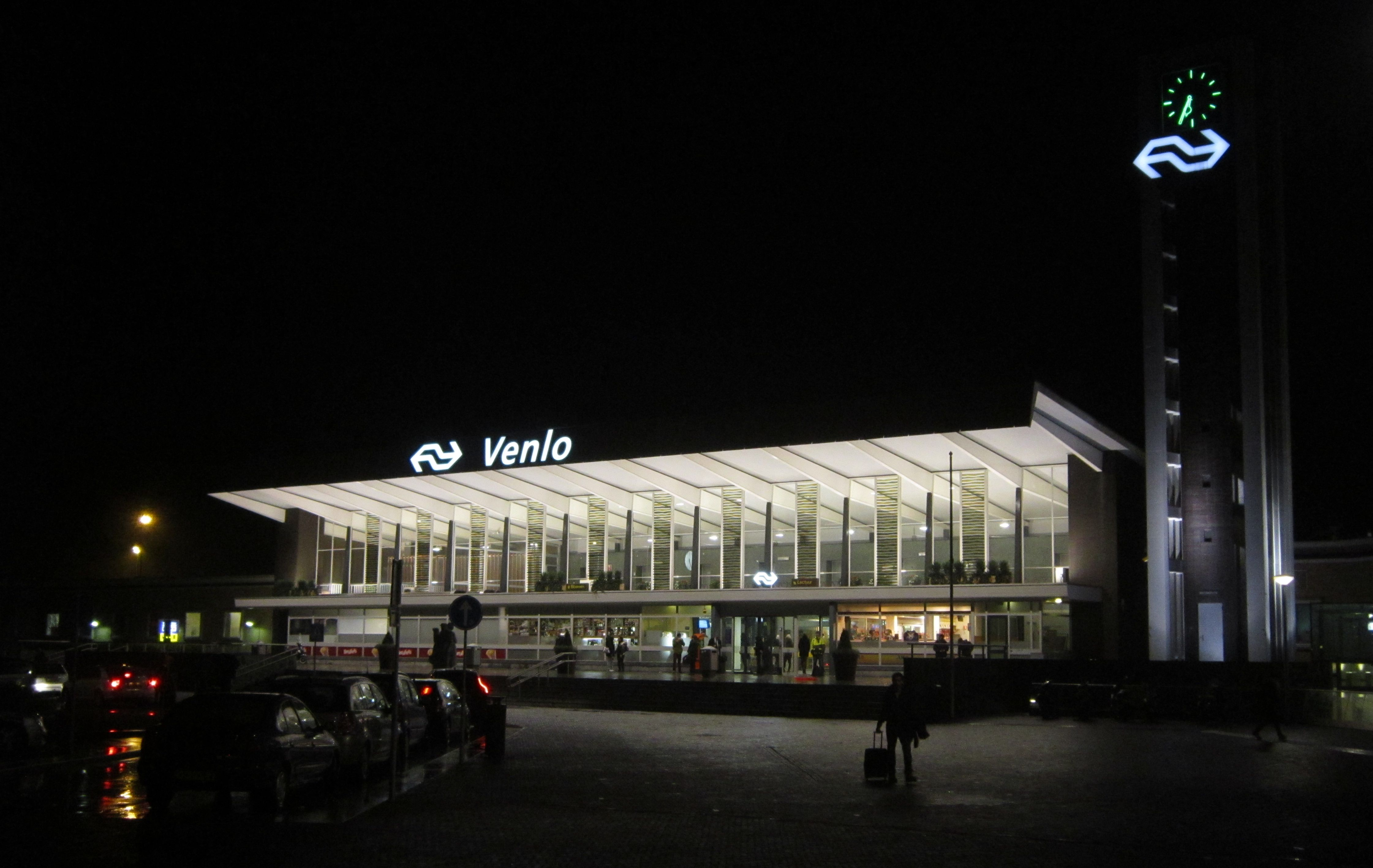
- Station at night

General information
- Location: Netherlands
- Coordinates: 51°21′53″N 6°10′17″E
- Operator: Nederlandse Spoorwegen
- Lines: Maastricht–Venlo railway; Viersen–Venlo railway; Venlo–Eindhoven railway; Nijmegen–Venlo railway
- Platforms: 6

Other information
- Station code: Vl

History
- Opened: 1865; 161 years ago

Services
Preceding station	Nederlandse Spoorwegen	Following station
Blerick towards Dordrecht	NS Intercity 3500	Terminus
Preceding station	Arriva Netherlands	Following station
Blerick towards Nijmegen	Stoptrein 32200	Tegelen towards Roermond
Preceding station		Following station
Terminus	RE 13	Kaldenkirchen towards Hamm (Westf) Hbf
Location
- Location within Netherlands

Venlo railway station is located in Venlo, the Netherlands. It is situated on the Maastricht–Venlo railway, the Viersen–Venlo railway, the Venlo–Eindhoven railway and the Nijmegen–Venlo railway.

The first station in Venlo was opened on 21 November 1865. The current building dates from 1958 and is a typical Dutch station of the post-war era, featuring a clock tower and a large canopy spanning the front of the station.

There is a bus station for regional and city buses in front of the station, as well as a car park.

== Train services ==
The following train services call at this station:

- Express services:
  - Intercity: Schiphol Airport–Utrecht–'s-Hertogenbosch–Eindhoven–Helmond–Venlo
  - RE 13: Venlo–Viersen–Mönchengladbach–Düsseldorf–Wuppertal–Hagen–Hamm
- Local services:
  - Stoptrein: Nijmegen–Venlo–Roermond

Venlo is a border station and therefore sees a significant number of shunting movements. On several tracks, the catenary can be switched between the 15 kV 16.7 Hz AC used on the Deutsche Bahn network and the 1500 V DC used by Nederlandse Spoorwegen network.

== Bus services ==
- City buses
  - 1: Blerick Vossener–Venlo Station–Venlo Hospital–Tegelen–Kaldenkirchen
  - 2: Blerick Klingerberg–Venlo Station–Venlo City Centre–Venlo Stalberg
  - 3: Venlo Station–City Centre–'t Ven–Noorderpoort–City Centre–Venlo Station
- Regional buses
  - 66: Venlo Station–Tegelen–Belfeld–Reuver–Beesel–Swalmen–Roermond Station
  - 70: Venlo Station–Blerick–Venlo Freshpark–Sevenum–Horst
  - 83: Venlo Station–Venlo–Velden–Lomm–Arcen–Wellerlooi–Well–Aijen–Nieuw-Bergen–Afferden–Heijen–Gennep–Ottersum–Milsbeek–Plasmolen–Mook–Molenhoek–Heumen–Malden–Nijmegen–Nijmegen Central Station
  - 87: Venray Station–Leunen–Castenray–Horst–Sevenum–Heierhoeve–Blerick–Venlo Station
  - 88: Venray Station–Oostrum–Wanssum–Meerlo–Tienray–Swolgen–Broekhuizenvorst–Broekhuizen–Lottum–Grubbenvorst–Blerick–Venlo Station
  - 370: (Limburgliner): Venlo Station–Venlo–Blerick–Maasbree–Helden–Panningen–Beringe–Meijel–Ospeldijk–Ospel–Nederweert–Weert
  - 377: (Limburgliner): Venlo Station–Hout-Blerick–Baarlo–Kessel–Kesseleik–Neer–Nunhem–Haelen–Horn–Roermond Station
  - 669: (school line): Meijel–Beringe–Panningen–Helden–Panningen
  - 670: (school line): Venlo Station–Blerick–Maasbree–Helden–Panningen
  - 671: Venlo–Blerick–Greenport–Grubbenvorst
  - 683: (school line): Well–Wellerlooi–Arcen–Lomm–Velden–Venlo
  - 687: (school line): Horst–Sevenum–Heierhoeve–Blerick–Venlo
