= Viersen (electoral district) =

Federal electoral district of Germany

110 Viersen
- Electoral district for the Bundestag
- Viersen in 2025
- State: North Rhine-Westphalia
- Population: 298,900 (2019)
- Electorate: 227,166 (2021)
- Major settlements: Viersen; Willich; Nettetal
- Area: 563.3 km^{2}

Current electoral district
- Created: 1949
- Party: CDU
- Member: Martin Plum
- Elected: 2021, 2025

Viersen is an electoral constituency (German: Wahlkreis) represented in the Bundestag. It elects one member via first-past-the-post voting. Under the current constituency numbering system, it is designated as constituency 110. It is located in western North Rhine-Westphalia, comprising the district of Viersen.

Viersen was created for the inaugural 1949 federal election. Since 2021, it has been represented by Martin Plum of the Christian Democratic Union (CDU).

== Geography ==
Viersen is located in western North Rhine-Westphalia. As of the 2021 federal election, it is coterminous with the Viersen district.

== History ==
Viersen was created in 1949, then known as Kempen-Krefeld. It acquired its current name in the 1980 election. In the 1949 election, it was North Rhine-Westphalia constituency 24 in the numbering system. From 1953 through 1961, it was number 83. From 1965 through 1976, it was number 81. From 1980 through 1998, it was number 80. From 2002 through 2009, it was number 112. In the 2013 through 2021 elections, it was number 111. From the 2025 election, it has been number 110.

Originally, the constituency comprised the district of Kempen-Krefeld. In the 1972 and 1976 elections, it comprised the Kempen-Krefeld district (renamed to the Viersen district in 1974) excluding the city of Viersen. Since 1980, it has comprised the entirety of the Viersen district.

Election	No.	Name	Borders
1949	24	Kempen-Krefeld	Kempen-Krefeld district
1953	83	Kempen-Krefeld	Kempen-Krefeld district
1957	83	Kempen-Krefeld	Kempen-Krefeld district
1961	83	Kempen-Krefeld	Kempen-Krefeld district
1965	81	Kempen-Krefeld	Kempen-Krefeld district
1969	81	Kempen-Krefeld	Kempen-Krefeld district
1972	81	Kempen-Krefeld	Kempen-Krefeld district (excluding Viersen municipality)
1976	81	Kempen-Krefeld	Viersen district (excluding Viersen municipality)
1980	80	Viersen	Viersen district
1983	80	Viersen	Viersen district
1987	80	Viersen	Viersen district
1990	80	Viersen	Viersen district
1994	80	Viersen	Viersen district
1998	80	Viersen	Viersen district
2002	112	Viersen	Viersen district
2005	112	Viersen	Viersen district
2009	112	Viersen	Viersen district
2013	111	Viersen	Viersen district
2017	111	Viersen	Viersen district
2021	111	Viersen	Viersen district
2025	110	Viersen	Viersen district

== Members ==
The constituency has been held continuously by the Christian Democratic Union (CDU) since 1949. It was first represented by Matthias Hoogen from 1949 to 1965, followed by Hugo Hammans from then until 1980. Julius Louven then served from 1980 to 2002. Uwe Schummer was elected in 2002, and re-elected in 2005, 2009, 2013, and 2017. He was succeeded by Martin Plum in 2021 and was re-elected in 2025.

Election	Member	Party	%
1949	Matthias Hoogen	CDU	43.5
1953	Matthias Hoogen	CDU	62.7
1957	Matthias Hoogen	CDU	65.5
1961	Matthias Hoogen	CDU	60.6
1965	Hugo Hammans	CDU	58.3
1969	Hugo Hammans	CDU	55.1
1972	Hugo Hammans	CDU	51.4
1976	Hugo Hammans	CDU	53.9
1980	Julius Louven	CDU	49.4
1983	Julius Louven	CDU	56.6
1987	Julius Louven	CDU	51.2
1990	Julius Louven	CDU	49.6
1994	Julius Louven	CDU	49.6
1998	Julius Louven	CDU	44.6
2002	Uwe Schummer	CDU	44.1
2005	Uwe Schummer	CDU	48.1
2009	Uwe Schummer	CDU	48.9
2013	Uwe Schummer	CDU	53.0
2017	Uwe Schummer	CDU	47.9
2021	Martin Plum	CDU	35.8
2025	Martin Plum	CDU	40.0

== Election results ==
=== 2025 election ===
Federal election (2025): Viersen
Notes:	Blue background denotes the winner of the electorate vote. Pink background denotes a candidate elected from their party list. Yellow background denotes an electorate win by a list member, or other incumbent. A ✓ or ✗ denotes status of any incumbent, win or lose respectively.						
Party	Candidate	Votes	%	±%	Party votes	%	±%
CDU	✓ Martin Plum	73,676	40.0	▲4.2	64,228	34.8	▲4.3
SPD	Silke Depta	38,071	20.7	▼6.9	33,644	18.2	▼8.5
AfD	Kay Gottschalk	29,425	16.0	▲10.0	29,312	15.9	▲9.9
Greens	David Nethen	19,438	10.6	▼3.5	21,085	11.4	▼3.4
Left	Simon Männersdörfer	11,337	6.2	▲3.0	11,875	6.4	▲3.4
FDP	Eric Scheuerle	7,317	4.0	▼4.8	10,039	5.4	▼7.4
BSW					6,873	3.7	
Tierschutzpartei					2,675	1.4	▼0.1
FW	Arbi Megerdich	2,510	1.4	▲0.1	1,170	0.6	▼0.1
Volt	André Martini	2,378	1.3		1,147	0.6	▲0.4
PARTEI				▼2.2	1,137	0.6	▼0.6
dieBasis				▼1.1	439	0.2	▼0.8
PdF					349	0.2	▲0.2
Team Todenhöfer					287	0.2	▼0.2
BD					255	0.1	
Values					126	0.1	
MERA25					55	0.0	
MLPD					26	0.0	0.0
Pirates							▼0.4
Gesundheitsforschung							▼0.1
ÖDP							▼0.1
Humanists							▼0.1
Bündnis C							▼0.1
SGP						0.0	0.0
Informal votes		1,682			1,112		
Total valid votes		184,152			184,772		
Turnout		185,834	83.1	▲6.0			
CDU hold	Majority	35,605	19.3				

=== 2021 election ===
Federal election (2021): Viersen
Notes:	Blue background denotes the winner of the electorate vote. Pink background denotes a candidate elected from their party list. Yellow background denotes an electorate win by a list member, or other incumbent. A ✓ or ✗ denotes status of any incumbent, win or lose respectively.						
Party	Candidate	Votes	%	±%	Party votes	%	±%
CDU	Martin Plum	62,123	35.8	▼12.0	52,896	30.4	▼7.6
SPD	Udo Schiefner	47,806	27.6	▲2.6	46,375	26.7	▲4.4
Greens	Rene Heesen	24,394	14.1	▲7.4	25,673	14.8	▲8.0
FDP	Eric Scheuerle	15,140	8.7	▲0.4	22,281	12.8	▼3.2
AfD	Kay Gottschalk	10,312	5.9	▼1.1	10,357	6.0	▼1.5
Left	Britta Pietsch	5,558	3.2	▼1.9	5,203	3.0	▼3.0
Tierschutzpartei					2,618	1.5	▲0.7
PARTEI	Marion Weißkopf	3,819	2.2		2,140	1.2	▲0.5
FW	Georg Alsdorf	2,253	1.3		1,327	0.8	▲0.5
dieBasis	Natalie Frohn	1,940	1.1		1,808	1.0	
Pirates					632	0.4	▼0.1
Team Todenhöfer					582	0.3	
Volt					377	0.2	
LIEBE					228	0.1	
Gesundheitsforschung					197	0.1	0.0
ÖDP					183	0.1	0.0
LfK					155	0.1	
NPD					140	0.1	▼0.1
Humanists					133	0.1	0.0
V-Partei3					120	0.1	0.0
Bündnis C					93	0.1	
du.					82	0.0	
PdF					54	0.0	
LKR					33	0.0	
MLPD					31	0.0	0.0
DKP					22	0.0	0.0
SGP					12	0.0	0.0
Informal votes		1,740			1,333		
Total valid votes		173,345			173,752		
Turnout		175,085	77.1	▲0.9			
CDU hold	Majority	14,317	8.2	▼14.6			

=== 2017 election ===
Federal election (2017): Viersen
Notes:	Blue background denotes the winner of the electorate vote. Pink background denotes a candidate elected from their party list. Yellow background denotes an electorate win by a list member, or other incumbent. A ✓ or ✗ denotes status of any incumbent, win or lose respectively.						
Party	Candidate	Votes	%	±%	Party votes	%	±%
CDU	✓ Uwe Schummer	82,165	47.9	▼5.1	65,475	38.1	▼8.2
SPD	Udo Schiefner	42,932	25.0	▼3.5	38,368	22.3	▼4.3
FDP	Andreas Bist	14,233	8.3	▲6.0	27,576	16.0	▲9.7
AfD	Kay Gottschalk	12,035	7.0	▲4.5	12,841	7.5	▲3.4
Greens	Jürgen Heinen	11,478	6.7	▼1.3	11,591	6.7	0.0
Left	Christoph Saßen	8,747	5.1	▲0.3	10,342	6.0	▲0.6
Tierschutzpartei					1,446	0.8	
PARTEI					1,207	0.7	▲0.4
Pirates					712	0.4	▼1.7
FW					433	0.3	0.0
NPD					366	0.2	▼0.7
AD-DEMOKRATEN					363	0.2	
DiB					185	0.1	
V-Partei³					164	0.1	
Gesundheitsforschung					163	0.1	
DM					162	0.1	
BGE					151	0.1	
ÖDP					149	0.1	0.0
Volksabstimmung					138	0.1	▼0.1
Die Humanisten					96	0.0	
MLPD					52	0.0	0.0
DKP					29	0.0	
SGP					9	0.0	0.0
Informal votes		1,690			1,262		
Total valid votes		171,590			172,018		
Turnout		173,280	76.2	▲2.6			
CDU hold	Majority	39,233	22.9	▼1.6			

=== 2013 election ===
Federal election (2013): Viersen
Notes:	Blue background denotes the winner of the electorate vote. Pink background denotes a candidate elected from their party list. Yellow background denotes an electorate win by a list member, or other incumbent. A ✓ or ✗ denotes status of any incumbent, win or lose respectively.						
Party	Candidate	Votes	%	±%	Party votes	%	±%
CDU	✓ Uwe Schummer	87,764	53.0	▲4.1	76,747	46.3	▲8.4
SPD	Udo Schiefner	47,198	28.5	▲2.8	44,103	26.6	▲4.0
Greens	Rene Heesen	8,880	5.4	▼2.4	11,106	6.7	▼2.2
Left	Britta Pietsch	7,998	4.8	▼2.0	8,897	5.4	▼2.0
AfD		4,182	2.5		6,806	4.1	
FDP	Andreas Bist	3,857	2.3	▼7.4	10,493	6.3	▼12.2
Pirates	Tobias Leppkes	3,466	2.1		3,464	2.1	▲0.5
NPD		1,684	1.0	▼0.1	1,557	0.9	▲0.1
PARTEI					552	0.3	
FW		575	0.3		457	0.3	
Volksabstimmung					355	0.2	▲0.1
PRO					303	0.2	
ÖDP					204	0.1	0.0
Nichtwahler					159	0.1	
REP					145	0.1	▼0.1
Party of Reason					113	0.1	
BIG					105	0.1	
RRP					99	0.1	0.0
PSG					43	0.0	0.0
BüSo					37	0.0	0.0
MLPD					32	0.0	0.0
Die Rechte					20	0.0	
Informal votes		1,886			1,693		
Total valid votes		165,604			165,797		
Turnout		167,490	73.6	▲1.4			
CDU hold	Majority	40,566	24.5	▲1.2			

=== 2009 election ===
Federal election (2009): Viersen
Notes:	Blue background denotes the winner of the electorate vote. Pink background denotes a candidate elected from their party list. Yellow background denotes an electorate win by a list member, or other incumbent. A ✓ or ✗ denotes status of any incumbent, win or lose respectively.						
Party	Candidate	Votes	%	±%	Party votes	%	±%
CDU	✓ Uwe Schummer	79,359	48.9	▲0.8	61,723	37.9	▼1.7
SPD	Udo Schiefner	41,691	25.7	▼11.5	36,743	22.6	▼11.1
FDP	Martin Knauber	15,755	9.7	▲4.3	30,071	18.5	▲5.6
Greens	Gabriele Bailey	12,633	7.8	▲3.2	14,433	8.9	▲2.2
Left	Britta Pietsch	11,102	6.8	▲3.1	11,935	7.3	▲3.0
Pirates					2,554	1.6	
NPD	Rolf Gunter Kretzschmann	1,836	1.1	▲0.2	1,428	0.9	▲0.1
Tierschutzpartei					1,269	0.8	▲0.2
FAMILIE					840	0.5	
RENTNER					723	0.4	
REP					302	0.2	▼0.1
RRP					171	0.1	
Volksabstimmung					133	0.1	0.0
ÖDP					130	0.1	
Centre					106	0.1	0.0
DVU					78	0.0	
PSG					25	0.0	0.0
BüSo					22	0.0	0.0
MLPD					22	0.0	0.0
Informal votes		1,990			1,658		
Total valid votes		162,376			162,708		
Turnout		164,366	72.2	▼6.4			
CDU hold	Majority	37,668	23.2	▲12.3			

=== 2005 election ===
Federal election (2005): Viersen
Notes:	Blue background denotes the winner of the electorate vote. Pink background denotes a candidate elected from their party list. Yellow background denotes an electorate win by a list member, or other incumbent. A ✓ or ✗ denotes status of any incumbent, win or lose respectively.						
Party	Candidate	Votes	%	±%	Party votes	%	±%
CDU	✓ Uwe Schummer	84,058	48.1	▲4.0	69,446	39.7	▼1.0
SPD	Udo Schiefner	64,985	37.2	▼3.9	58,961	33.7	▼3.6
FDP	Thomas Brandt	9,520	5.4	▼2.2	22,469	12.8	▲1.8
Greens	Martina Maaßen-Pyritz	8,065	4.6	▼0.48	11,651	6.7	▼1.1
Left	Klaus Müller	6,568	3.8	▲2.9	7,627	4.4	▲3.5
NPD	Rolf Kretzschmann	1,598	0.9		1,319	0.8	▲0.6
Tierschutzpartei					1,033	0.6	▲0.2
Familie					847	0.5	▲0.2
GRAUEN					663	0.4	▲0.2
REP					417	0.2	
PBC					182	0.1	
From Now on... Democracy Through Referendum					132	0.1	
Centre					95	0.1	
BüSo					41	0.0	
Socialist Equality Party					73	0.0	
MLPD					48	0.0	0.0
Informal votes		2,478			2,268		
Total valid votes		174,794			175,004		
Turnout		177,272	78.5	▼2.1			
CDU hold	Majority	19,073	10.9				
