= Dare (graffiti artist) =

Swiss artist (1968–2010)

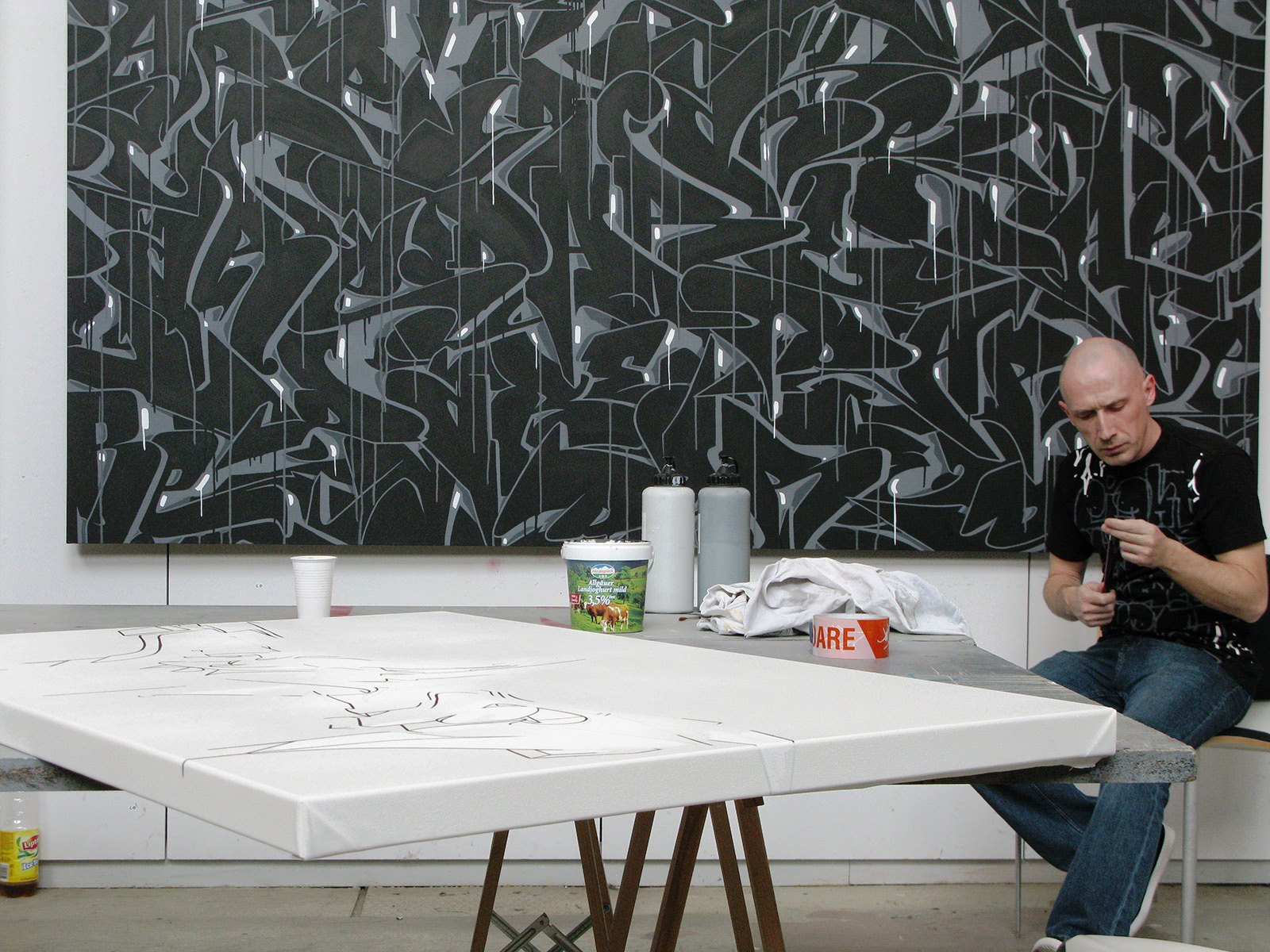
- Dare in his studio, 2008
- Born: Siegfried von Koeding; September 15, 1968; Basel, Basel-Stadt, Switzerland
- Died: March 6, 2010 (aged 41); Basel, Basel-Stadt, Switzerland
- Resting place: Cemetery am Hörnli
- Movement: Graffiti
- Parents: Rolf Kurt von Koeding (father); Yvette Amann (mother)
- Memorials: Sigi von Koeding-Anlage
- Website: dare.ch

Tag

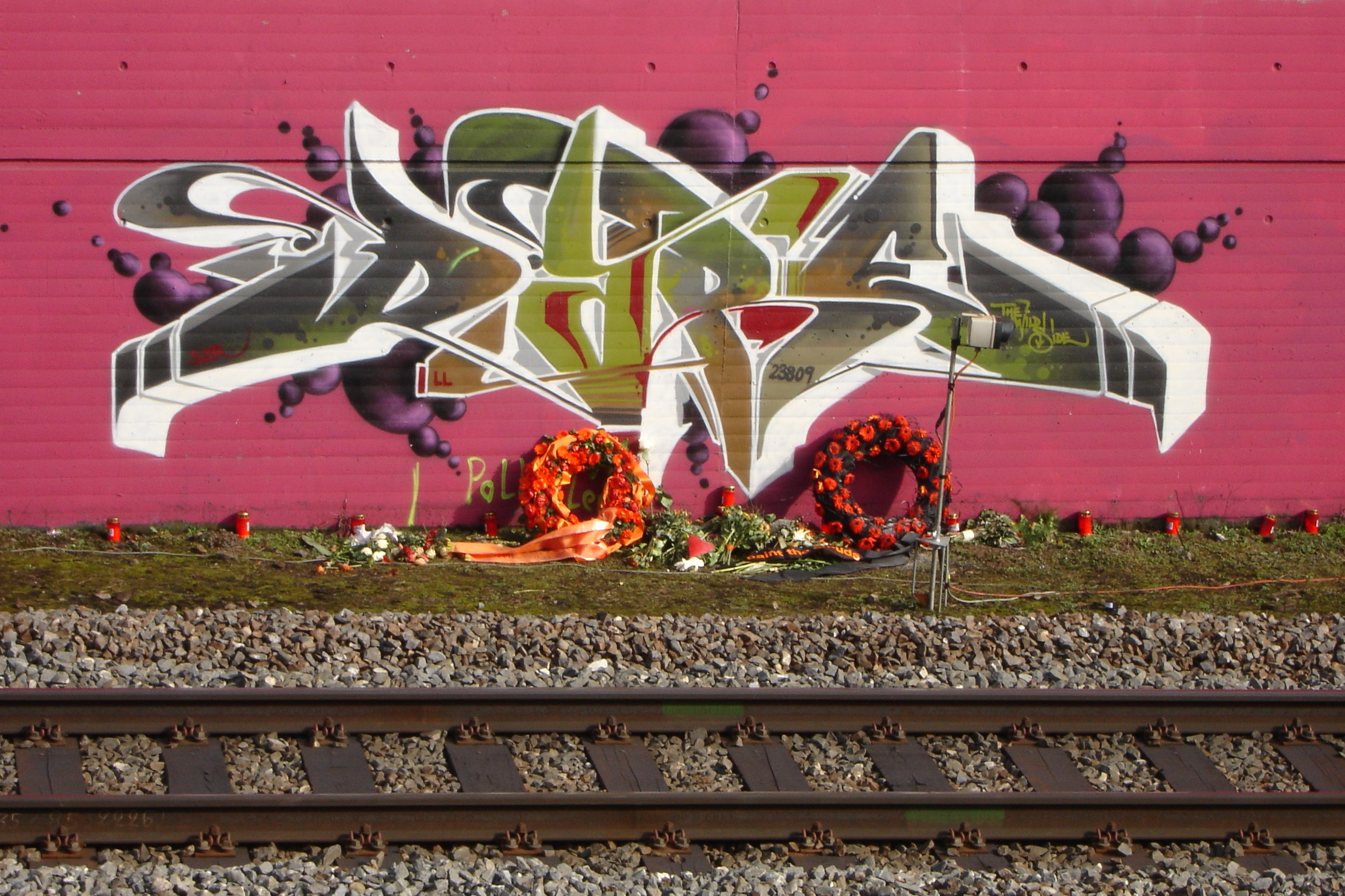
Wreaths and candles at a Dare Graffiti, 2010

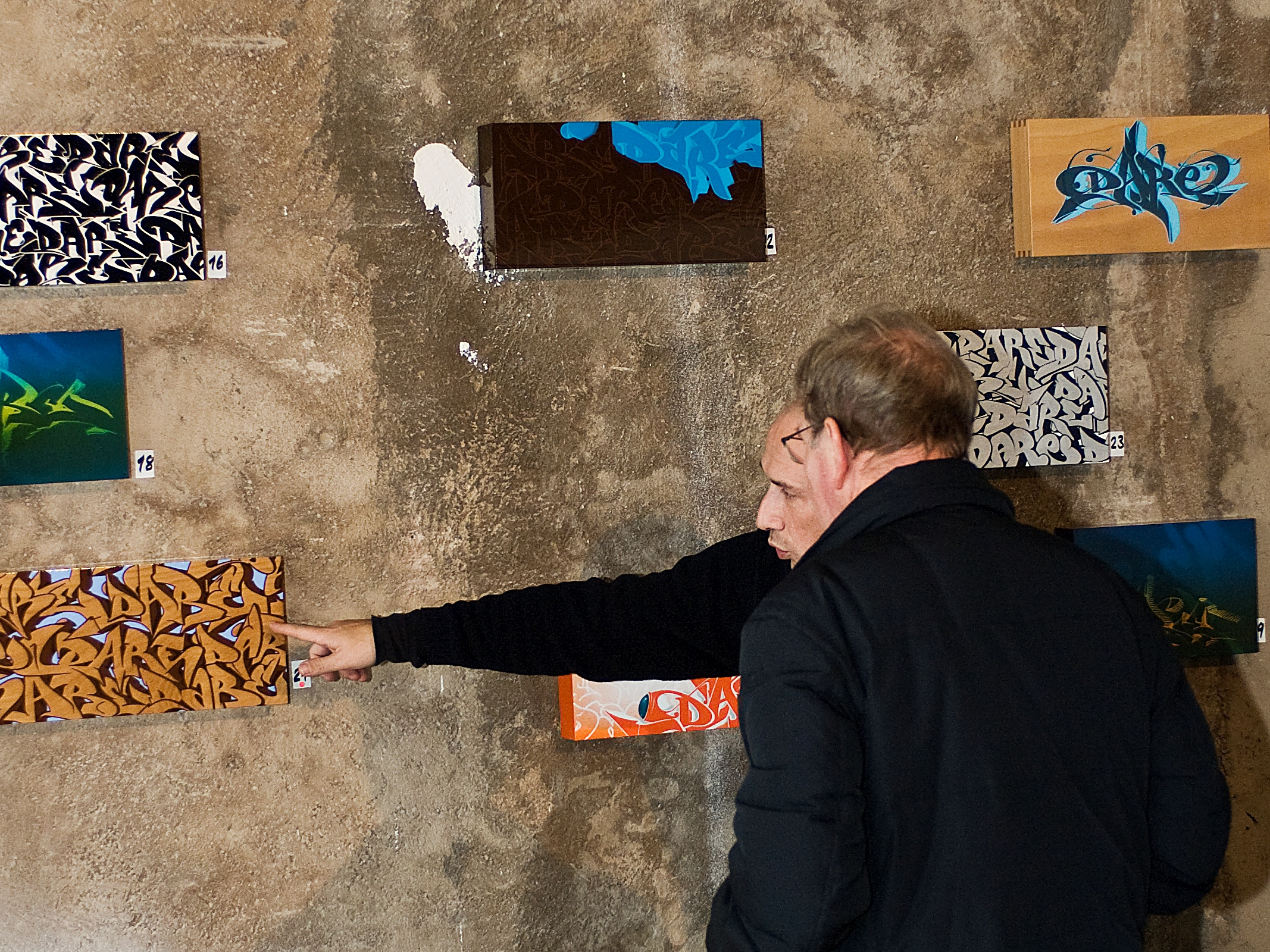
Dare Basel home game show, last exhibition 2009

Dare, born Siegfried von Koeding (15 September 1968 – 6 March 2010) was a Swiss graffiti artist and curator.

== Life and work ==
Dare was born in Basel, Switzerland, to Swiss author Yvette Amman and the German Rolf Kurt von Koeding. He began writing in 1986. Using the pseudonym Dare he started his art career in 1990, making easel paintings.

After his first contract for the photographer Onorio Mansutti and a large wall installation for the district of Münchenstein (1990), works such as a stage design for the Bejart Ballet in Lausanne (1992) and painting the theatre tram for Migros-North-West Switzerland (1995) followed, with his first international press reports accompanied by television appearances and reports on Swiss television. This was followed by commissions for the design of facades, walls and shops in Los Angeles, New York City, and Hamburg, and live-paintings with other artists in Paris, Barcelona, Zagreb and Naestved (DK). At the graffiti exhibition "Concrete or Wallpapers" 2001 in the Swiss embassy in London, Dare met Banksy, who invited him to the exhibition "Urban Discipline" in Hamburg.

The industrialist and photographer Gunter Sachs commissioned a large interior work of more than 200 square metres in his apartment in Schloss Velden at lake Wörthersee. Gunter Sachs photographed it for Architectural Digest. At the International Watch and Jewelry Exhibition Baselworld 2007, Pierre DeRoche presented a limited edition of 11 watches with faces by Dare with a "Spray-Happening" in the presence of the artist.

The Fine Arts Museum in Leipzig showed some of Dare's pictures in the exhibition "Art is Feminine". In SFR1 on 15 April 2009 Sigi von Koeding told the Swiss TV talk show host Kurt Aeschbacher about his career stretching from illegal writer to internationally recognised artist. Dare died from a brain tumour less than a year later, on 6 March 2010, and was buried in the graveyard Friedhof am Hörnli in Basel.

DARE's work for Sachs was posthumously rated by the Financial Times as one of the best examples of interior graffiti. On the 6th anniversary of Dare's death, in 2016, an exhibition of his work was shown in the Basilea Foundation in Basel.

== Artist's statement ==
"Script is for me an expression of personality, in that letters do not only serve to communicate subject matter, but are also a mirror of the writer. And that is what I do, I write. My artistic roots lie in Writing, which is known in our society as Graffiti. For more than 20 years I have been dealing intensively and actively with writing, I have learnt its basic typographical form and developed it further on my own. The name DARE stands for a pseudonym which I gave myself in 1986. After all these years in which I have written my name on the walls of the world, it is for me a matter of honesty to write this name on canvas. My pictures are thus to be seen as written self-portraits, and if one believes that handwriting is an expression of personality, then life can be found in every letter. Conversely stated, this is me. DARE!"

== Literature ==
- Beat Suter, Sigi von Koeding: Swiss Graffiti. 1st Edition, Edition Aragon (1998) ISBN 3-89535-461-9.
- Bernhard van Treeck: Writer Lexikon: American Graffiti. 1st Edition, Edition Aragon, Berlin 1995, ISBN 3-89535-428-7, S. 40.
- Bernhard van Treeck: Das grosse Graffiti-Lexikon (The Big Graffiti Lexocin). Lexikon-Imprint-Verlag, Berlin (2001) ISBN 3-89602-292-X, S. 82.
- Mirko Reisser, Gerrit Peters, Heiko Zahlmann (Hrsg.): Urban Discipline 2000: Graffiti-Art. 1. Auflage. Urban Discipline: Graffiti-Art, Nr. 1. getting-up, Hamburg 2000, ISBN 3-00-006154-1, S. 62 (limited preview in Google book search [retrieved 2 February 2013] exhibition catalogue).
- Mirko Reisser, Gerrit Peters, Heiko Zahlmann (Hrsg.): Urban Discipline 2001: Graffiti-Art. 1st edition. Urban Discipline: Graffiti-Art, Nr. 2. getting-up, Hamburg 2001, ISBN 3-00-007960-2, S. 78 (limited preview in der Google book search [retrieved on 2 February 2013] Exhibition Catalogue).
- Mirko Reisser, Gerrit Peters, Heiko Zahlmann (Hrsg.): Urban Discipline 2002: Graffiti-Art. 1st Edition. Urban Discipline: Graffiti-Art, Nr. 3. getting-up, Hamburg 2002, ISBN 3-00-009421-0, S. 14 (limited preview in Google book search [retrieved on 2 February 2013] Exhibition Catalogue).
- Kai Hendrik Schlusche: StreetArt Basel und Region, The Hot-Spots in the Dreiländereck (three-country corner); Publisher GUDBERG NERGER GmbH Hamburg 2015 ISBN 978-3-945772-00-3
- Yvette Amann and Dieter Buchhart: DARE to be different – Sigi von Koeding 1968-2010, ISBN 978-3-939566-44-1
- Genealogical Handbook of the Aristocracy, Adelige Häuser, Volume XXXI 2009, Complete Series volume 147, Seite 216
