= Wilhelm Hünermann =

German writer (1900–1975)

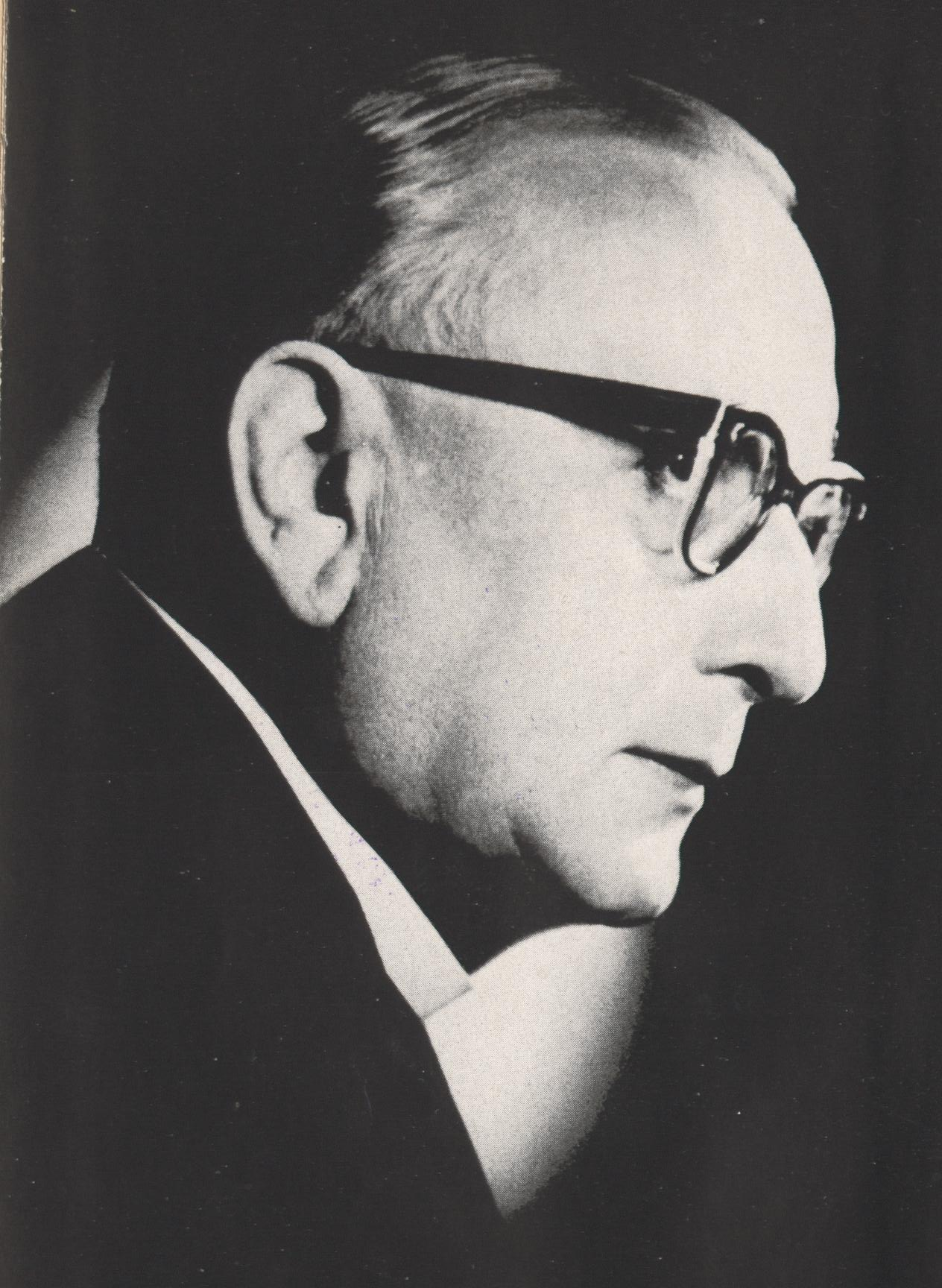
- Born: 28 July 1900; Kempen, Germany
- Died: 28 November 1975 (aged 75)
- Occupations: novelist, short story writer, playwright
- Writing career
- Period: 1931–1969
- Genre: biographical novel
- Subject: hagiography

Wilhelm Hünermann (28 July 1900 – 28 November 1975) was a German priest and writer, best known for his novelized biographies of Roman Catholic saints.

== Life and Works ==
Wilhelm Hünermann was born in Kempen, Germany. His father was a professor of mathematics and physics. In 1923, Hünermann was ordained to the priesthood and started serving in Essen in the Diocese of Aachen. His first play, the tragedy Children's Crusade (Der Kinderkreuzzug), was published in 1931, and in 1936 he made a breakthrough with the biographical novel on the Moravian-German Redemptorist Clement Maria Hofbauer.

In the same year, the transfer of the mortal remains of the missionary Damien de Veuster from a Hawaiian leper colony to his native Belgium inspired Hünermann to compose a biographical novel about him (Priester der Verbannten). Hünermann spent his childhood and served for some time near Flanders which he loved and knew quite well. Thus in the novel about the Flemish Father Damien, he introduced his own deep sympathies and concerns about the then rather culturally oppressed Belgian Flemings, while at the same time showing how selfless devotedness, which Father Damien personified, transcended narrow national and racial borders. It was possible to interpret the novel in different ways: German and Flemish nationalists could take it as a support of Germanic Flemings against Romance Walloons, but the majority of other Europeans understood it as an affecting story about the unshakable love and patience of the Catholic missionary. Be that as it may, the novel was soon translated into numerous European and non-European languages, and also determined his writing orientation for the rest of his life: except several plays and short stories, the author almost entirely dedicated himself to the saints’ biographies.

With his thirty biographical novels, Hünermann was one of the most prolific hagiographers of the 20th century. His works sold more than three million copies and were translated into over twenty languages, primarily French, Spanish, Slovene, Croatian, Polish, Czech, Slovak, Hungarian, Lithuanian, Romanian and Dutch. His writings, especially those on the youthful saints, were intended mostly for young readers, but have always been read and well received by readers of all ages and professions. Displaying an extreme sensitivity for sanctity in all its forms and circumstances, Hünermann discovered it all around and put it forth as an objective and a model. Before and during writing his biographical works, he thoroughly studied the bulk of available material concerning a certain person, from newspaper articles to diary notes, letters and existent biographies, and tried to incorporate each interesting detail or testimony into a harmonious whole.

One of his memoir booklets concerned the German Cardinal Clemens August von Galen (Clemens August: Aus dem Lebensbuch des Kardinals Graf von Galen, 1947), a great moral fighter against the Nazi terror who was a rector in the Berlin parish where Hünermann served as a curate. He paid tribute to the fighters against Nazism in some other works, too (e.g. Die Jungen von Hallstadt, 1949).

He produced an extensive edifying synthesis of church history (Geschichte des Gottesreiches, in four volumes, 1956–1958), as well as a comprehensive collection of missionary portraits (Geschichte der Weltmission: Lebensbilder großer Missionare, in three volumes, 1960–1961).

Die Herrgottsschanze meaning 'the lord's redoubt', is one of Hünermann's most acclaimed works. The 1940 novel about the priest Peter Coudrin, active during and after the French revolution, which at the time of publication was actually a call for the underground resistance to Nazism; Vater Kolping: Ein Lebensbild des Gesellenvaters, a socially committed work on Father Adolph Kolping; Um Mädchenehre, a moving story about a contemporary martyr for chastity, Maria Goretti that was published on the occasion of her canonization; and an exceedingly lively and impressive portrait of the French village priest Jean Vianney, Der Heilige und sein Dämon.
