= Uwe Schummer =

German politician (born 1957)

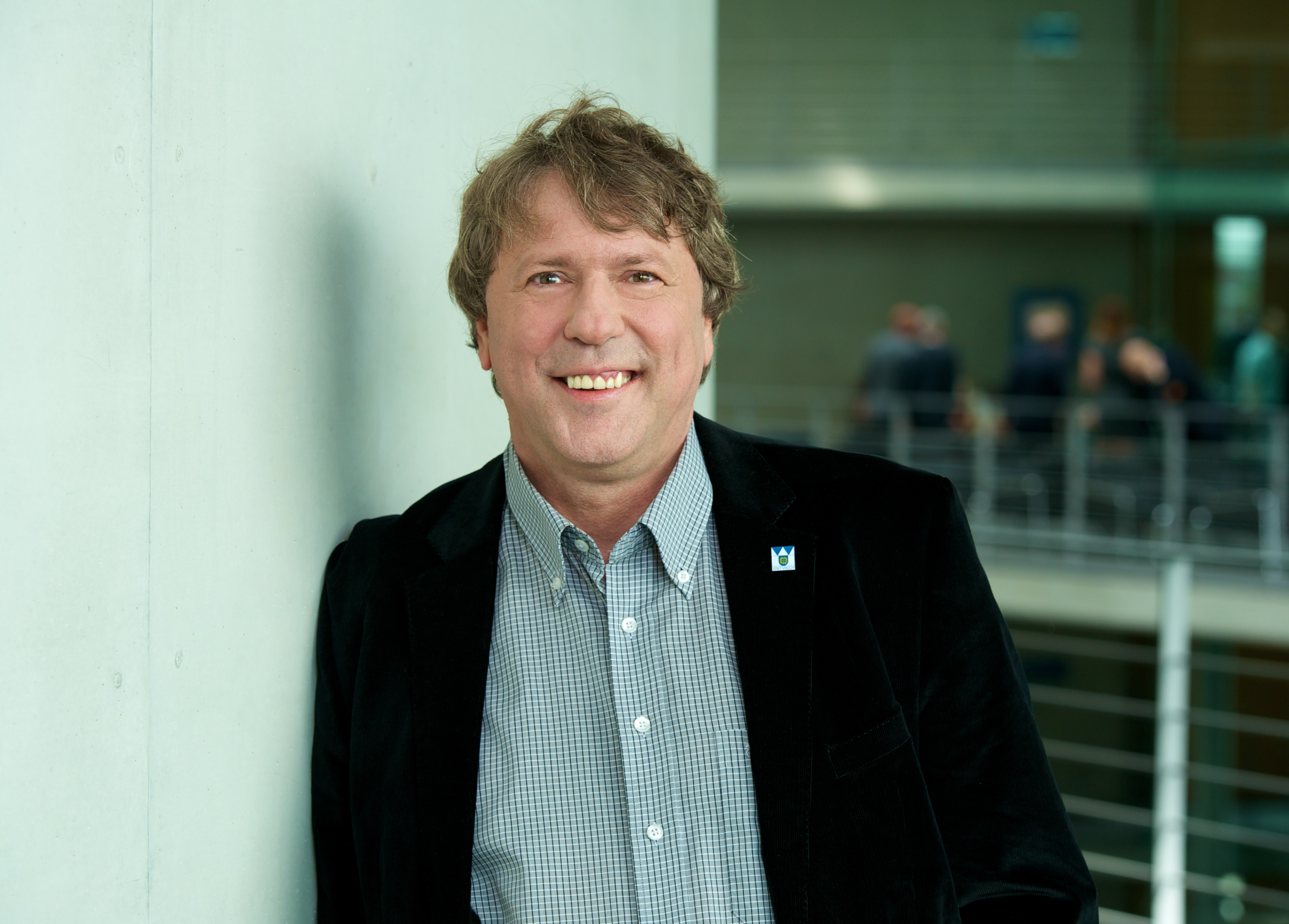
- Schummer in 2012

Member of the Bundestag
- In office 2002–2021

Personal details
- Born: 14 November 1957 (age 68) Adelaide, Australia
- Occupation: Politician
- Website: https://uwe-schummer.de/

Uwe Schummer (born 14 November 1957 in Adelaide, Australia) is a German politician of the Christian Democratic Union (CDU) from Willich who was a member of the Bundestag from 2002 until 2021.

== Early life and career ==
After finishing school in 1974, Schummer completed an apprenticeship as a merchant. From 1979 to 1980 he did his military service in the Bundeswehr sports promotion section in Warendorf. From 1978 to 1983 he took part in the 4 × 400 metres relay at the German Athletics Championships. After his military service, Schummer worked as a clerk at Stadtwerke Willich until he 1983 when he began to work for the Catholic Workers Movement (KAB). From 1987 to 1989 he was Chief of Staff at the parliamentary office of Minister of Labor Norbert Blüm (CDU). In 1989 he became press spokesman of the Christian Democratic Employees' Association (CDA). Since 2009 Schummer is in a civil partnership.

== Member of the Bundestag ==
Schummer has always won direct election to the Bundestag in the Viersen constituency:

- Parliamentary elections on 22 September 2002: 44.1% of the primary vote
- Parliamentary elections on 18 September 2005: 48.1% of the primary vote
- Parliamentary elections on 27 September 2009: 48.9% of the primary vote
- Parliamentary elections on 22 September 2013: 53% of the primary vote

From 2014 Schummer served as Commissioner of the CDU/CSU parliamentary group for people with disabilities. He was a member of the Committee on Education, Research and Technology Assessment, where he served as spokesperson of the CDU/CSU parliamentary group from 2009 to 2014.

In the negotiations to form a Grand Coalition of Chancellor Angela Merkel's Christian Democrats (CDU together with the Bavarian CSU) and the Social Democrats (SPD) following the 2013 federal elections, Schummer was part of the CDU/CSU delegation in the working group on education and research policy, led by Johanna Wanka and Doris Ahnen.

Following the 2017 elections, Schummer announced that he would not stand in the 2021 elections but instead resign from active politics by the end of the parliamentary term.

== Other activities ==
- action medeor, Member of the Advisory Board (since 2004)
- RWE Power AG, Member of the Supervisory Board
- IG Metall, Member

== Political positions ==
Ahead of the Christian Democrats’ leadership election in 2018, Schummer publicly endorsed Annegret Kramp-Karrenbauer to succeed Angela Merkel as the party’s chair. In 2019, he joined 14 members of his parliamentary group who, in an open letter, called for the party to rally around Merkel and Kramp-Karrenbauer amid criticism voiced by conservatives Friedrich Merz and Roland Koch.

In 2019, Schummer joined an international group of parliamentarians in a joint call for a body to strengthen the democratic representation of the world’s citizens in global affairs and the UN’s decision-making.
