= Lidwina =

Dutch mystic (1380-1433)

Saint Lidwina of Schiedam
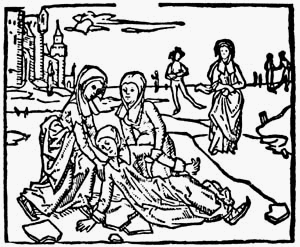
- Lidwina's fall on the ice, Wood drawing from the 1498 edition of John Brugman's Vita of Lidwina

Mystic, Confessor
- Born: April 18, 1380; Schiedam, County of Holland, Holy Roman Empire
- Died: April 14, 1433 (aged 52); Schiedam, County of Holland, Holy Roman Empire
- Venerated in: Roman Catholic Church
- Canonized: March 14, 1890, Saint Peter's Basilica, Kingdom of Italy by Pope Leo XIII
- Major shrine: Schiedam, South Holland, Netherlands
- Feast: April 14
- Patronage: chronically ill, ice skaters, town of Schiedam

Lidwina (Lydwine, Lydwid, Lidwid, Liduina of Schiedam) (April 18, 1380 – April 14, 1433) was a Dutch mystic who is honored as a saint by the Catholic Church. She is the patroness saint of the town of Schiedam, of chronic pain, and of ice skating.

At the age of fifteen, she suffered a serious injury while ice skating and became progressively disabled. Hendrik Mande wrote for her consolation a pious tract in Dutch. She fasted frequently and acquired a reputation as a healer and holy woman. Upon her death in 1433, her grave became a place of pilgrimage.

== Life ==
Lidwina was born in Schiedam, Holland, one of nine children. Her father was a laborer. At age 15, she was ice skating when she fell and broke a rib. She never recovered and became progressively disabled for the rest of her life. Her biographers state that she became paralyzed except for her left hand and that great pieces of her body fell off, and that blood poured from her mouth, ears, and nose. Today, some posit that Saint Lidwina is one of the first known multiple sclerosis patients and attribute her disability to the effects of the disease and her fall.

After her fall, Lidwina fasted continuously and acquired fame as a healer and holy woman. The town officials of Schiedam, her hometown, promulgated a document (which has survived) that attests to her complete lack of food and sleep. At first she ate a little piece of apple, then a bit of date and watered wine, then river water contaminated with salt from the tides. The authenticating document from Schiedam also attests that Lidwina shed skin, bones, parts of her intestines, which her parents kept in a vase and which gave off a sweet odor. These excited so much attention that Lidwina had her mother bury them.

Lidwina was credited with many acts of curing and charity, providing abundant food and nourishment to the needy that miraculously multiplied or lasted longer than expected.

Lidwina died at the age of 52.

== Biographies ==
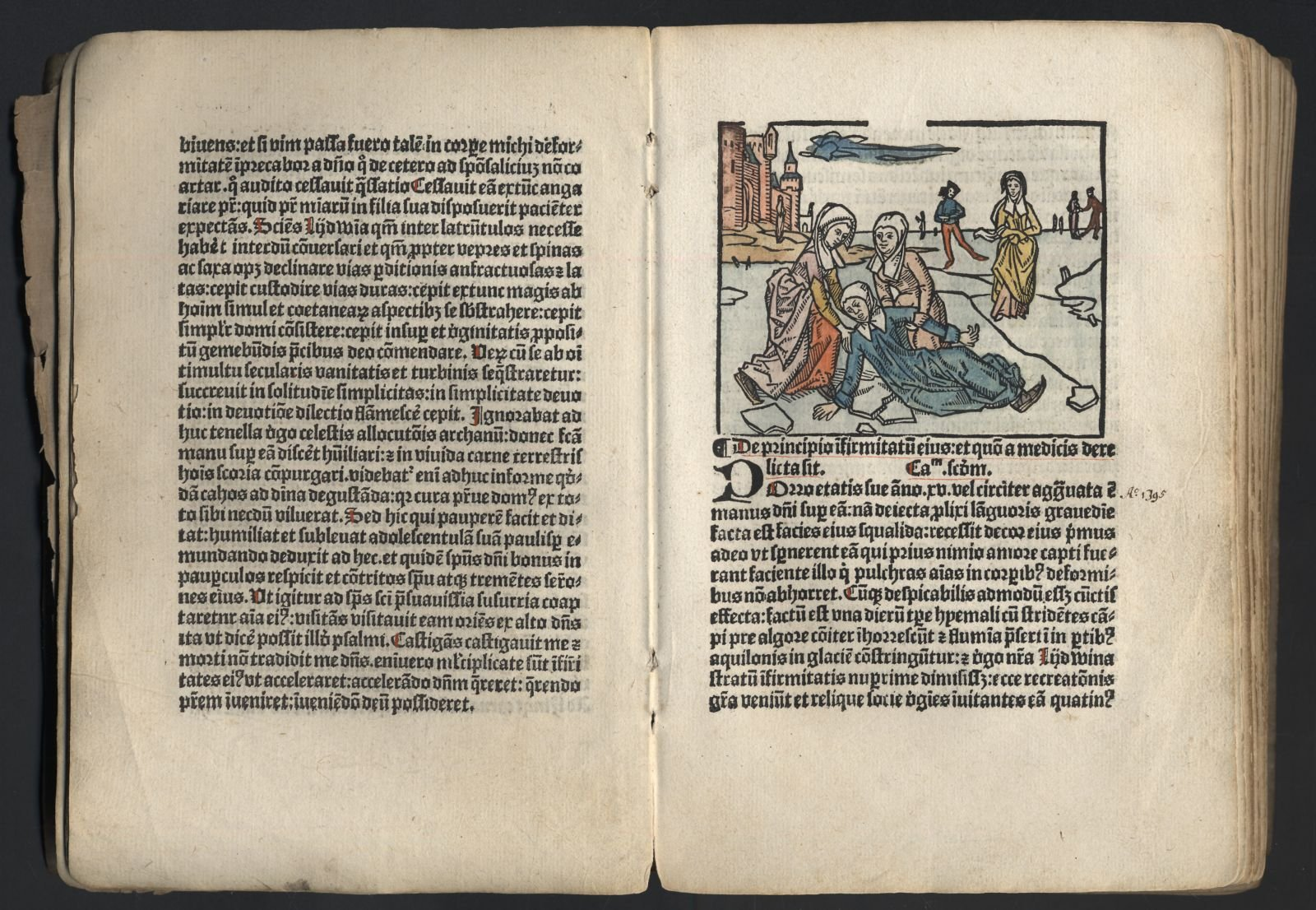
Johannes Brugman's publication, printed in Schiedam in 1498.

Several hagiographical accounts of her life exist. One of these states that while the soldiers of Philip of Burgundy were occupying Schiedam, a guard was set around her to test her fasts, which were authenticated. It is also reported that four soldiers abused her during this occupation, claiming that Lidwina's swollen body was due to her being impregnated by the local priest rather than from her sickness.

The well-known German preacher and poet, Friar John Brugman, wrote two lives of St. Lidwina, the first in 1433, was reprinted anonymously at Leuven in 1448, and later epitomised by Thomas à Kempis at Cologne in his Vita Lidewigis. The second life appeared at Schiedam in 1498; both have been embodied by the Bollandists in the Acta Sanctorum under 2 April. In 1901, Joris-Karl Huysmans published a biography of Lidwina. It was translated into English in 1923. Huysmans writes in his preface, "I have made use, in this Life, of the three texts of [Jan] Gerlac, [Jan, as Huysmans calls] Brugman, and à Kempis, completing their anecdotes by collation...."

The image of Lidwina's fall is from a 1498 woodcut accompanying Brugman's text. It shows her in the conventional trope of the Swooning Mary as depicted in Rogier van der Weyden's 1435 The Descent from the Cross. According to figure skating writer and historian Ellyn Kestnbaum, Lidwina's biography and Brugman's woodcut is evidence that by the 14th and 15th centuries, ice skating was an established wintertime activity for both men and women in Holland.

== Veneration ==
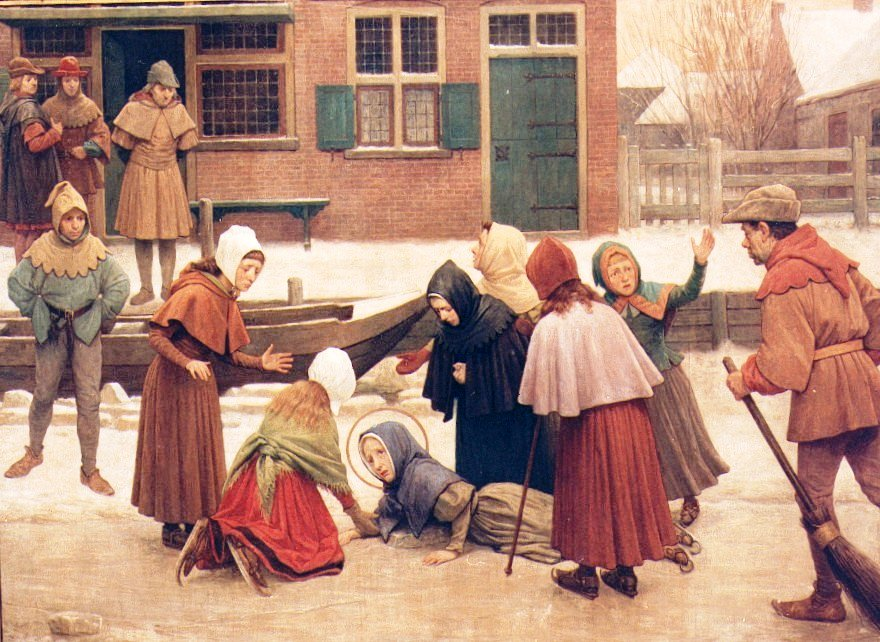
Saint Lidwina by Jan Dunselman, 1890

Lidwina died in 1433 and was buried in a marble tomb in the chapel of the parish church of Schiedam which became a place of pilgrimage. Thomas à Kempis's publication caused an increase in veneration. Her father's house, in which she died, was, after her death, converted into a monastery of Gray Sisters, of the third order of St. Francis. The Calvinists demolished the above-mentioned chapel; but changed the monastery into a hospital for orphans. In 1615, her relics were taken to Brussels and enshrined in the Church of St. Michael and St. Gudula (now Brussels' cathedral).

In 1859, the Church of Our Lady of Visitation (Onze Lieve Vrouw Visitatie) was opened on the Nieuwe Haven in Schiedam, commonly called Frankelandsekerk after the area it was located in (West-Frankeland). In 1871, Lidwina's relics were returned to Schiedam. On 14 March 1890, Pope Leo XIII granted Lidwina equipollent canonization in view of her long standing cultus. In 1931, this church was officially dedicated to St. Lidwina and called Church of Lidwina (Lidwinakerk).

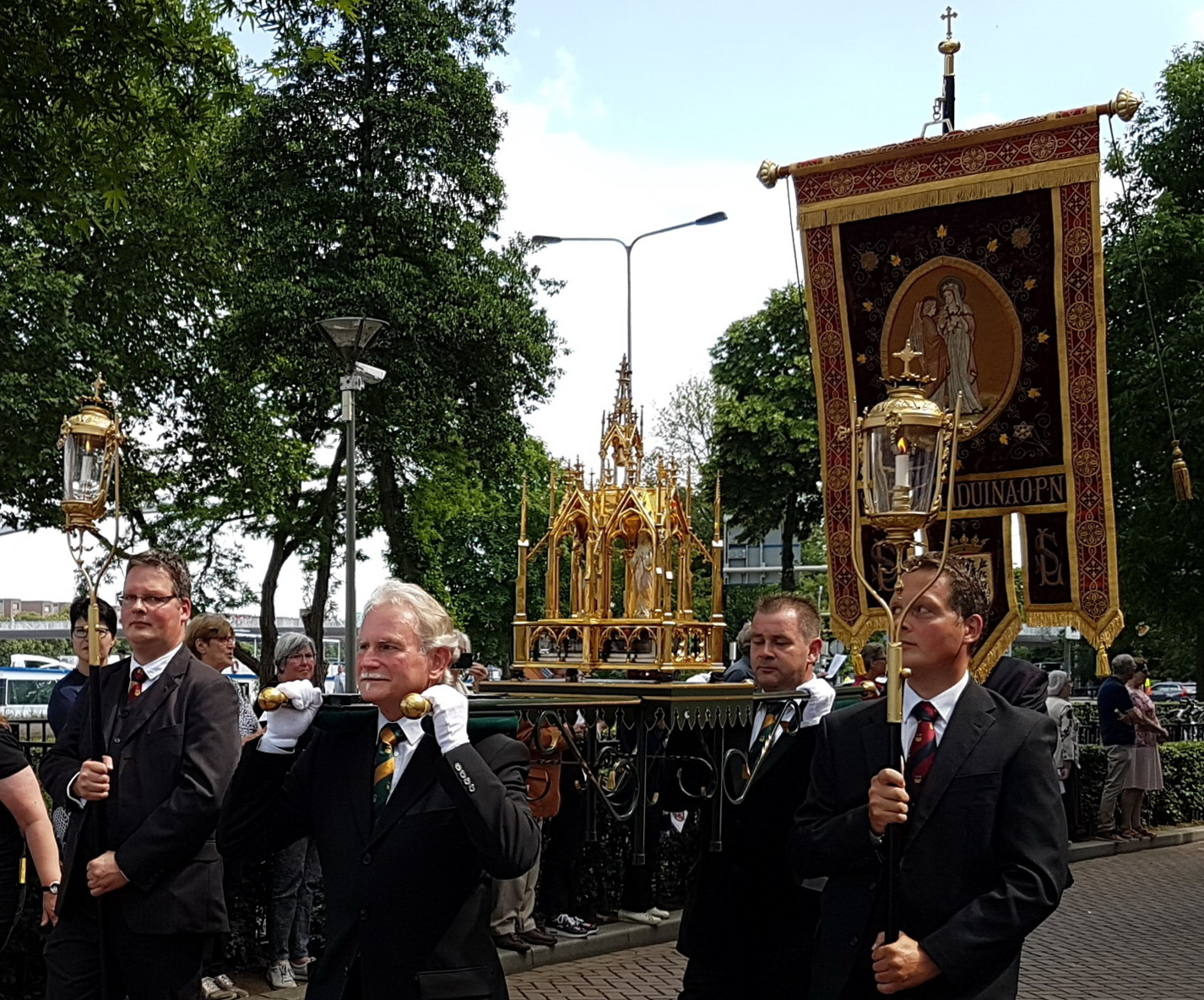
Saint Lidwina's relics in a historic religious procession during the 2018 Heiligdomsvaart (Relics Pilgrimage), Maastricht, Netherlands

After 1968, veneration of Lidwina was moved to the "Singelkerk", hence known as the Church of St. Lidwina and Our Lady of the Rosary. The church contains four paintings depicting scenes from the life of St. Lidwina. The paintings date from the early twentieth century and were made by the painter Jan Dunselman (1863–1931). The panels come from the Frankeland church that was demolished in 1968. The church was elevated to become a minor basilica on 18 June 1990 by Pope John Paul II. The church is now popularly known as the Basilica of Lidwina.

After the closure of the Church of Lidwina in 1969, the statue of the saint and her relics were removed to the chapel dedicated to her in the rest-home West-Frankeland on the Sint Liduinastraat in town. Only after the demolition of the chapel in 1987 were all devotional objects removed to the Singelkerk, i.e. the Basilica of Lidwina. She is the patron saint of ice skaters and the chronically ill, as well as of the town of Schiedam. Her feast day is 14 April. Schiedam celebrates Saint Liduina on the Sunday before Ascension Day.

Lidwina's name is attached to numerous institutions in Schiedam. Since 2002, the Foundation Intorno Ensemble produces a bi-annual musical theatrical performance about the town saint in one of the Schiedam churches. Outside Schiedam, there is a modern (1960s) church in the Dutch town of Best carrying her name (Lidwina Parochie Best).

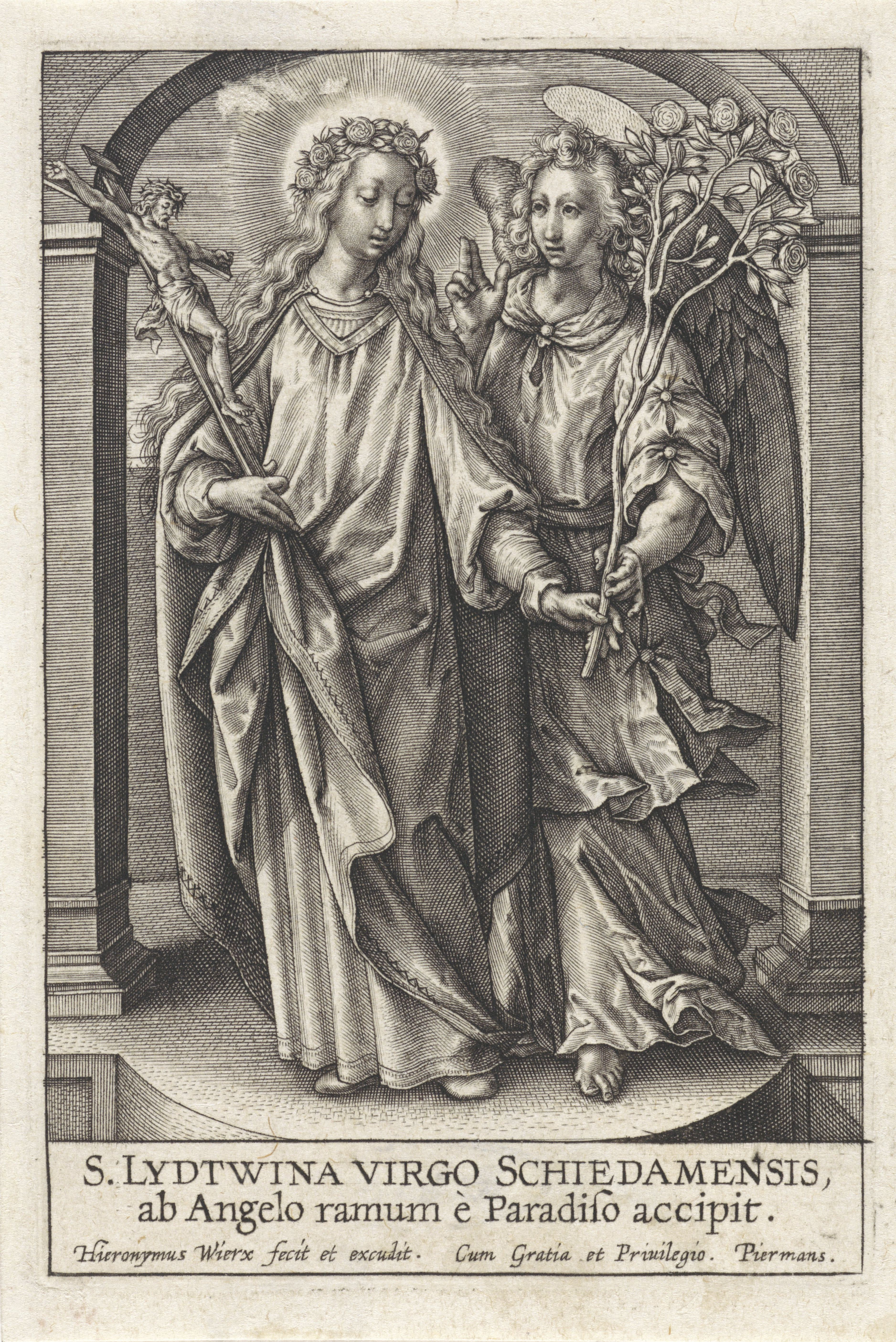
An angel brings St. Lidwyna a branch of roses by Hieronymus Wierix

=== Iconography ===
Lidwina is represented receiving a branch of roses and a flowering rod from an angel.

== Multiple sclerosis ==
Historical texts reveal that she was affected by a debilitating disease, sharing many characteristics with multiple sclerosis, such as the age of onset, duration, and course of disease. Lidwina's disease began soon after her fall. From that time onward, she developed walking difficulties, headaches and violent pains in her teeth. By the age of 19, both her legs were paralyzed and her vision was disturbed. Over the next 34 years, Lidwina's condition slowly deteriorated, although with apparent periods of remission, until her death at the age of 52. Together these factors suggest that a posthumous diagnosis of multiple sclerosis may be plausible, therefore dating the disease back to the 14th century. Canadian neurologist Thomas John Murray contested the theory, stating that "[e]nthusiastic, exaggerated reports and myth building by those who revered her saintliness make interpretation of her condition difficult for the historian."

== See also ==
- Saint Lidwina, patron saint archive
