= Kempen, Germany =

Kempen
- Town
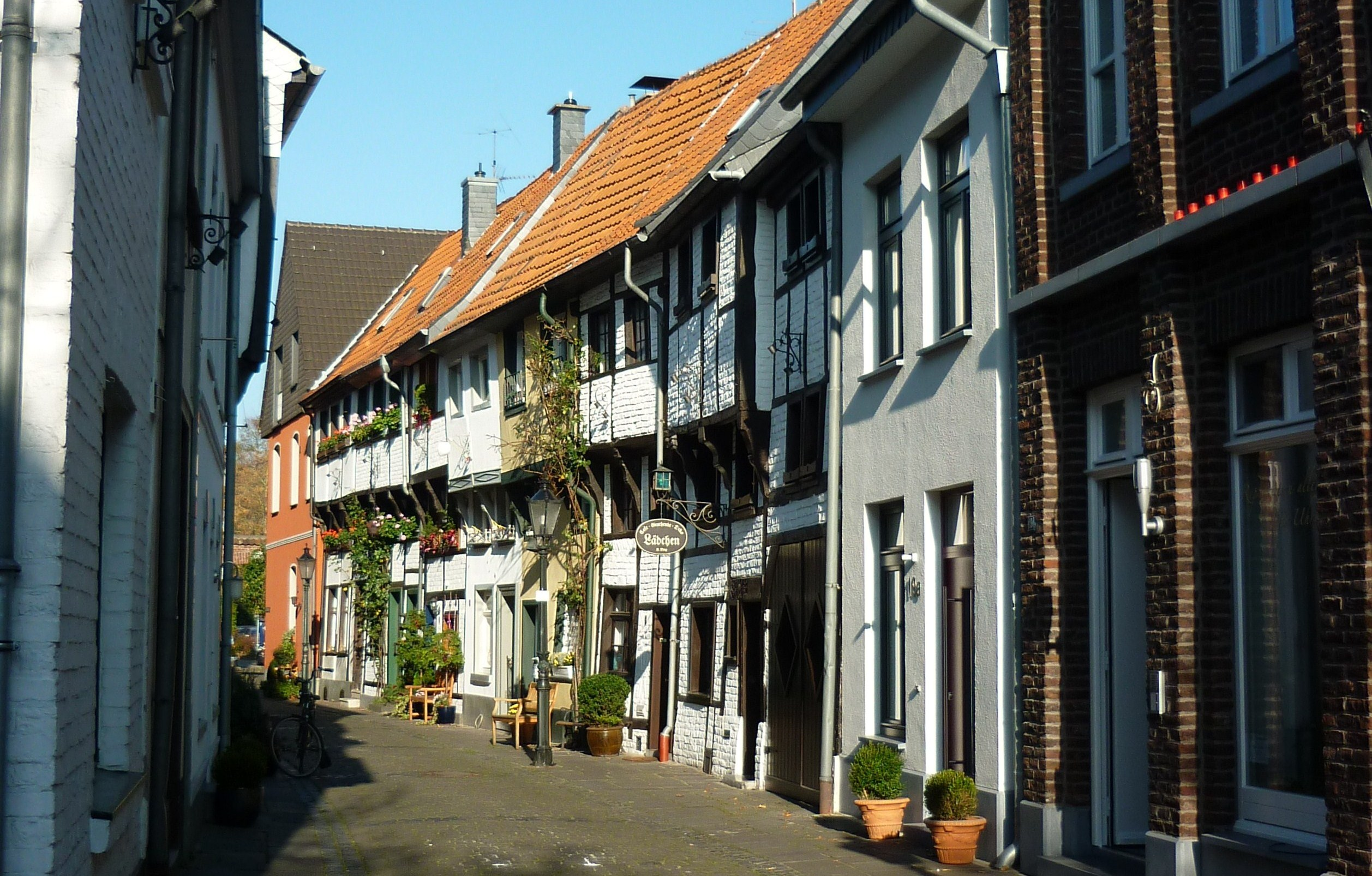
- Old School Street

- Coat of arms

- Location of Kempen within Viersen district
- Interactive map of Kempen
- Location within Germany Location within North Rhine-Westphalia
- Coordinates: 51°21′57″N 6°25′10″E
- Country: Germany
- State: North Rhine-Westphalia
- Admin. region: Düsseldorf
- District: Viersen
- Subdivisions: 4

Government
  - Mayor (2025–30): Christoph Dellmanns

Area
  - Total: 68.8 km^{2} (26.6 sq mi)
- Elevation: 30–68 m (98–223 ft)

Population (2025-12-31)
  - Total: 33,897
  - Density: 493/km^{2} (1,280/sq mi)
- Time zone: UTC+01:00 (CET)
  - Summer (DST): UTC+02:00 (CEST)
- Postal codes: 47906
- Dialling codes: 02152 / 02845
- Vehicle registration: VIE / KK
- Website: www.kempen.de

Kempen (German: [ˈkɛmpn̩]) is a town in the district of Viersen, in North Rhine-Westphalia, Germany. It is situated approximately 30 kilometres (19 mi) northwest of Düsseldorf, and 20 kilometres (12 mi) east of Venlo.

== History ==
- 1186: First mention in official documentation of Kempen as a place – the sovereign until 1794 is the Archbishop (electoral prince) of Cologne
- around 1290: Kempen is rebuilt as a fortified town
- 11 March 1294: First confirmation of Kempen as a town in official documentation
- 15th century: town blooms economically and culturally (population of approx. 4,200)
- 1542–1543: Kempen is the centre of the Reformation for the Lower Rhine
- 1579: The plague costs the town almost half of its inhabitants
- 1642: Kempen is conquered and destroyed by the allied French, Hessian and Weimar troops during the "Hessen War" (Thirty Years' War)
- 1794–1814: Kempen is under French rule. In the département of Roer established in 1797, Kempen becomes a canton seat in 1798 and a French town in 1801.
- 1815: After the Congress of Vienna, Kempen becomes Prussian and is the county seat
- 1929: Due to local reforms, Kempen becomes the administrative seat of the county of Kempen-Krefeld
- 1966 onward: Restoration of the old town
- 1970: Communal restructuring: The communities of Hüls, St. Hubert, Tönisberg and Schmalbroich join Kempen along with the localities of St. Peter and Unterweiden to form a single town
- 1975: In further local reforms, Hüls is assigned to the city of Krefeld. The county of Viersen is formed and Kempen becomes part of "Kreis Viersen"
- 1984: The county seat is transferred from Kempen to Viersen.
- 1987: A cultural forum is opened in the Franciscan monastery after comprehensive restoration and renovation work.
- 11 March 1994: Date of the 700-year jubilee of the confirmation of Kempen as a town

== Population ==
Historical population

Year	Pop.	±% p.a.
1965	24,090	—
1970	27,221	+2.47%
1975	29,582	+1.68%
1980	30,166	+0.39%
1985	31,464	+0.85%
1990	33,809	+1.45%
1995	36,093	+1.32%

Year	Pop.	±% p.a.
2000	36,019	−0.04%
2005	36,323	+0.17%
2010	35,890	−0.24%
2015	34,837	−0.59%
2020	34,537	−0.17%
2025	33,897	−0.37%

Source: Landesdatabank Nordrhein-Westfalen

== Politics ==
The current mayor is Christoph Dellmanns who has been serving since 2020. In the 2025 local elections, he was reelected with 89% of votes. His only opponent was Joachim von Contzen of Die PARTEI.

=== Council ===
After the 2025 elections, the Kempen city council is composed as follows:

Party	Votes	%	+/-	Seats	+/-
Christian Democratic Union (CDU)	6,887	38.0	▼1.5	20	±0
Social Democratic Party (SPD)	3,157	17.4	▼0.7	9	±0
Alliance 90/The Greens (Grüne)	2,939	16.2	▼6.2	8	▼3
Alternative for Germany (AfD)	1,754	9.7	▲7.8	5	▲4
Free Voters Kempen (FWK)	1,275	7.0	▲3.2	4	▲2
Free Democratic Party (FDP)	1,047	5.8	▼2.7	3	▼1
The Left (Die Linke)	726	4.0	▲1.9	2	▲1
ÖDP-Citizens Initiative Kempen (ÖDP-BIKK)	255	1.4	▼1.6	1	▼1
The PARTY (PARTEI)	85	0.5	New	0	New
Valid votes	18,125	98.9			
Invalid votes	198	1.1			
Total	18,323	100.0		52	▲2
Electorate/voter turnout	28,523	64.2			
Source: City of Kempen

== Twin towns – sister cities ==
Kempen is twinned with:

- Wambrechies, France (1972)
- Orsay, France (1973)
- East Cambridgeshire, England, United Kingdom (1978)
- Werdau, Germany (1990)

== Notable people ==
- Thomas à Kempis (c. 1380–1471)
- John Brugman (?–1473), Franciscan friar and preacher in Flanders
- Wilhelm Hünermann (1900–1975), priest and writer
- Adolph Moses Radin (1848–1909), rabbi
- Udo Schiefner (1959–2025), politician
- Isabel Varell (born 1961), actress and singer
- Bernhard van Treeck (born 1964), psychiatrist and author
- Tobias Koch (born 1968), pianist
- Daniel Altmaier (born 1998), Tennis player
- Luca Witzke (born 1999), Handball player
- Jordan Beyer (born 2000), Football player

== Gallery ==
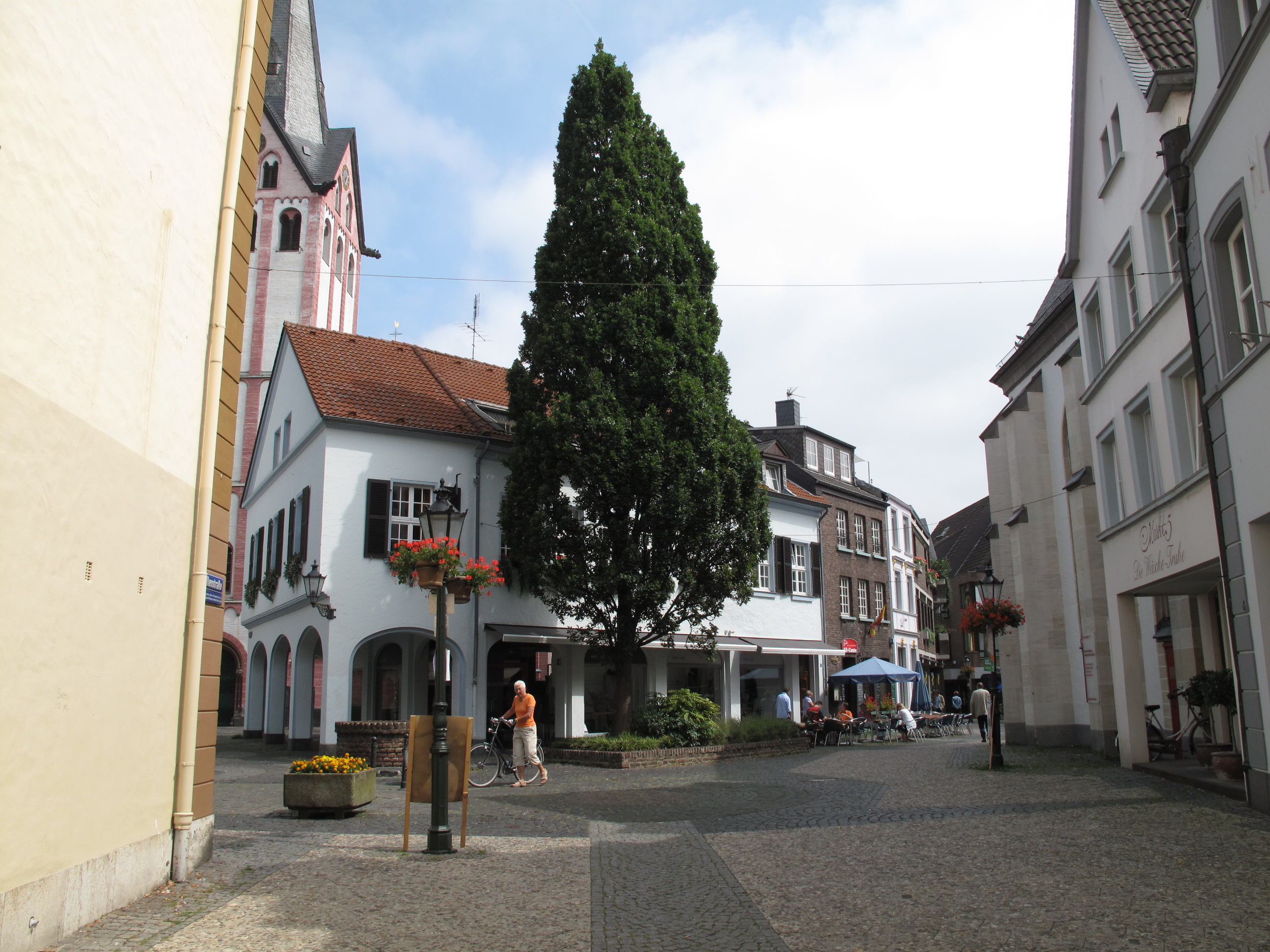
View in a street

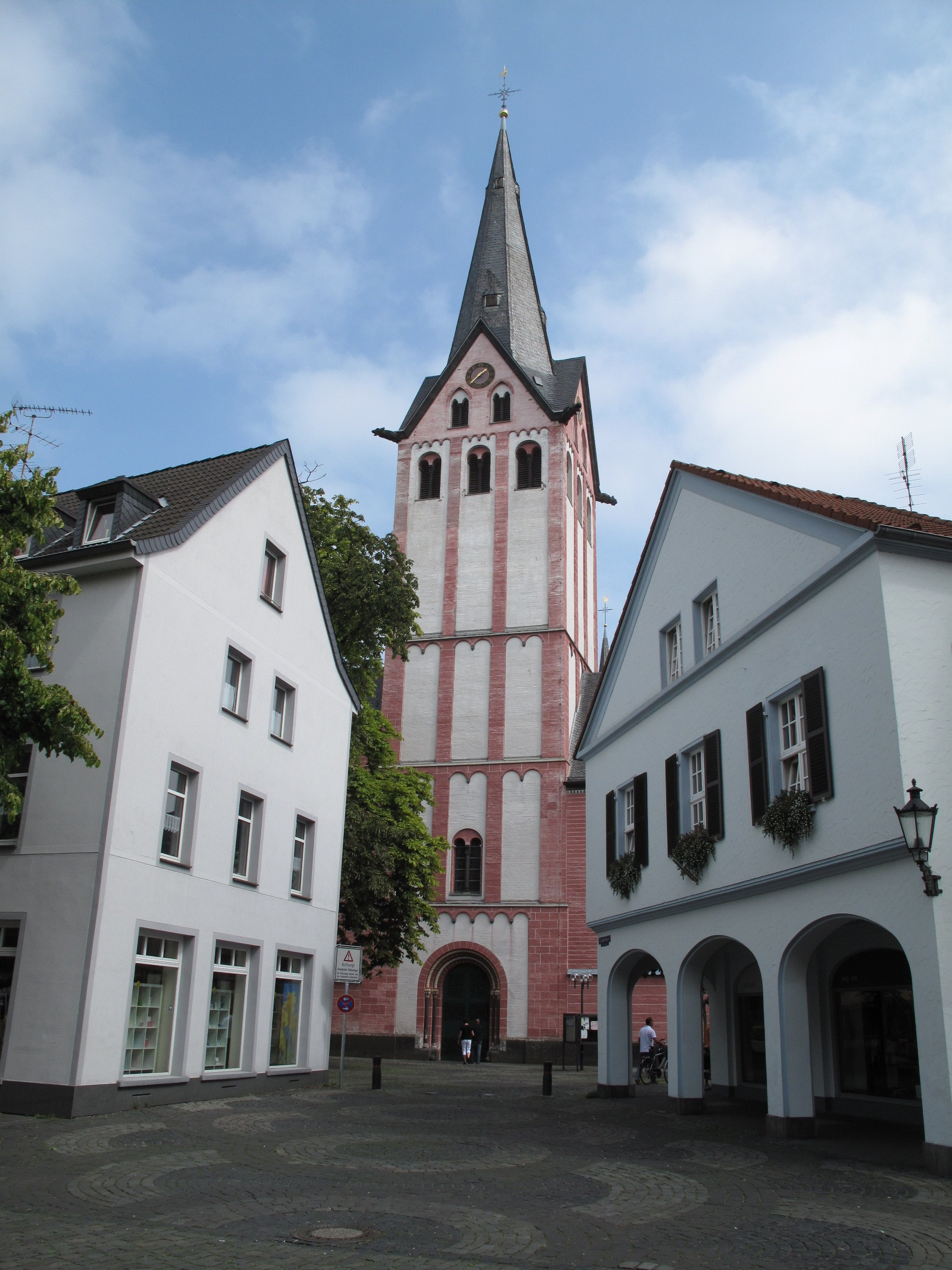
Church

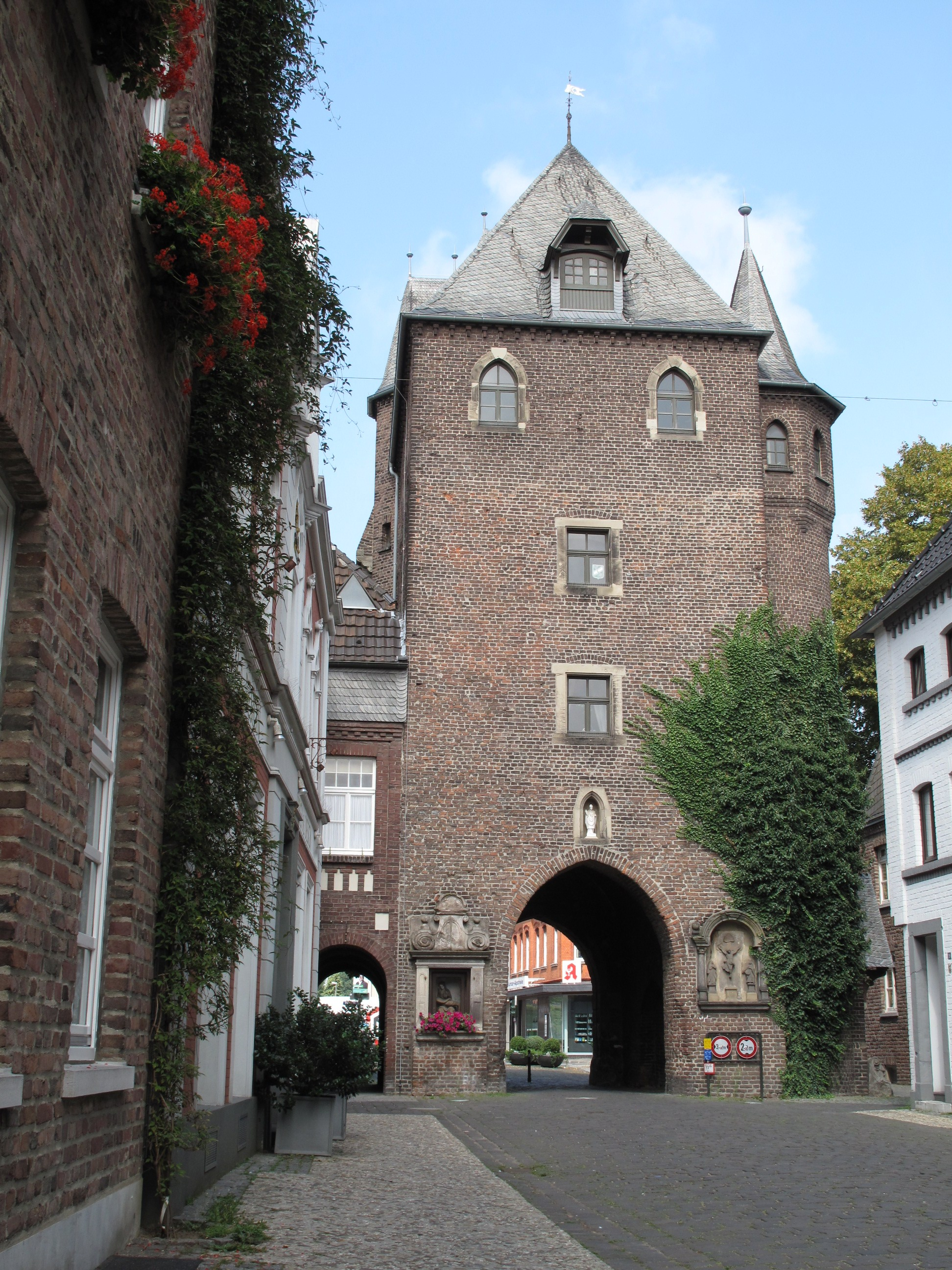
Towngate (Das Kuhtor)

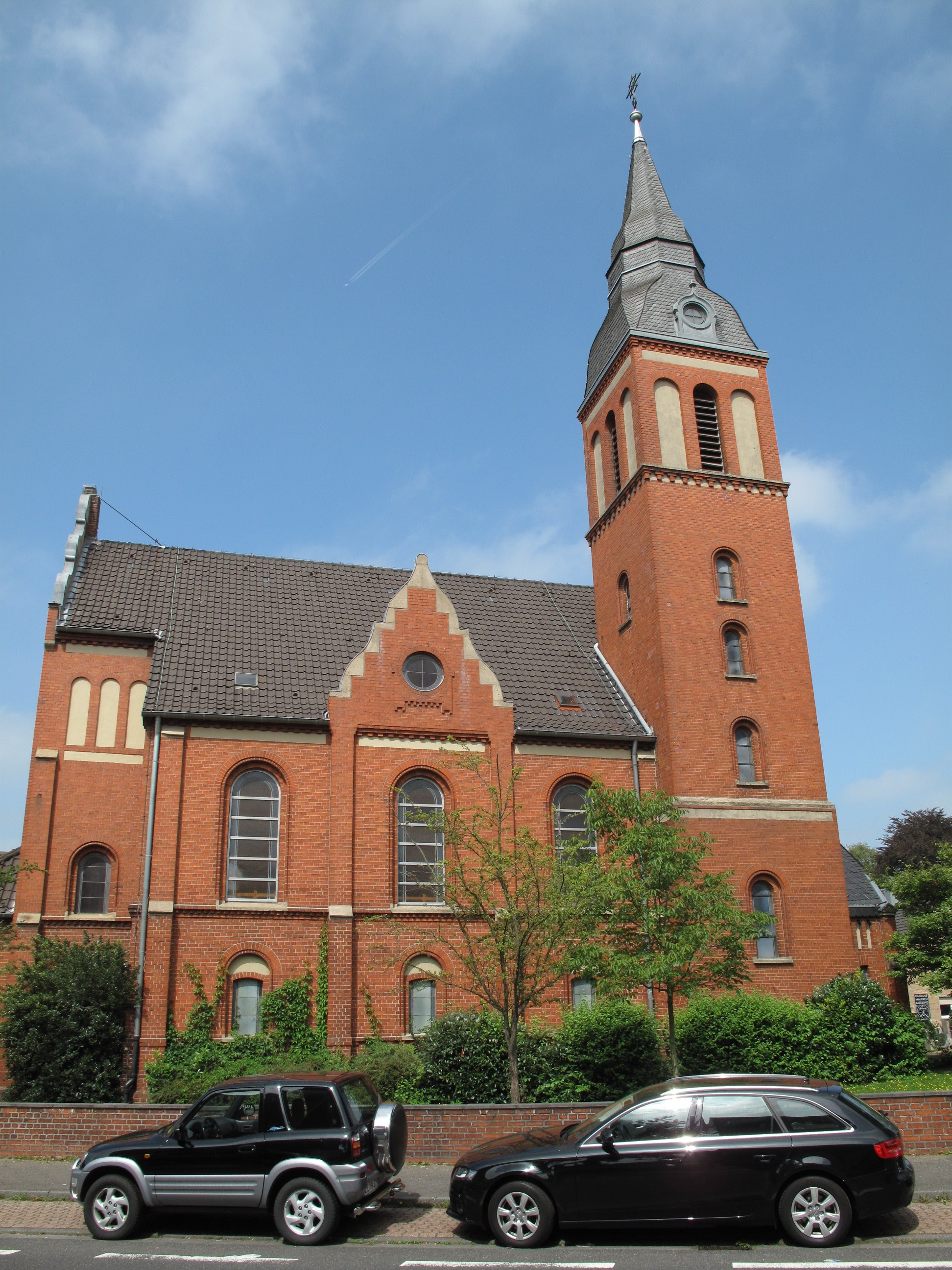
Lutheran church (Thomas Church)

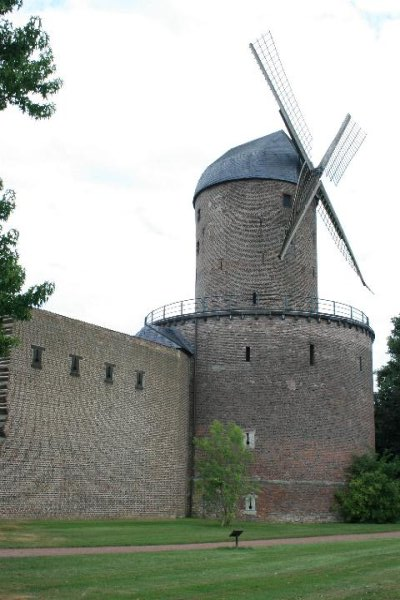
Hessenmühle

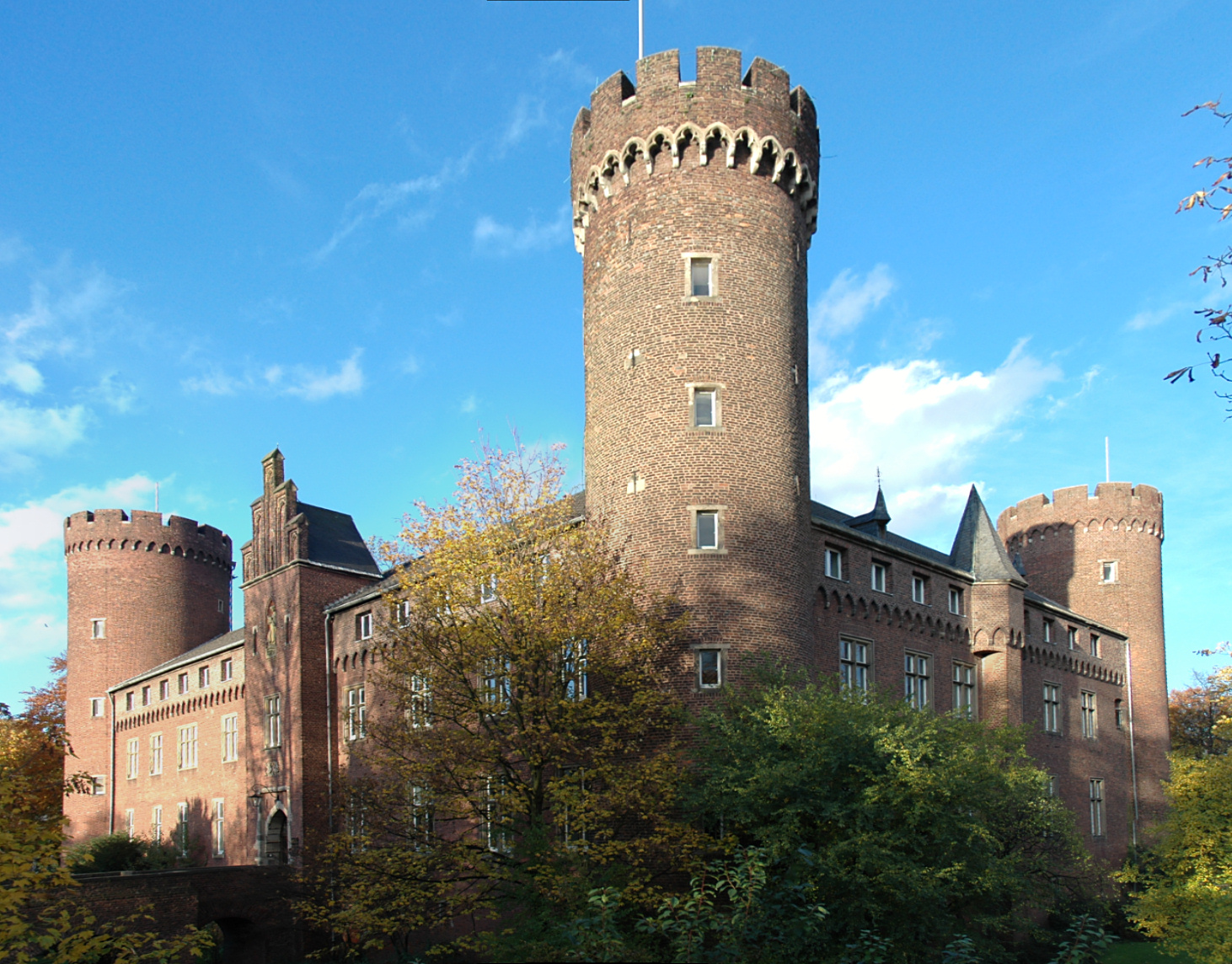
Kempen Castle
