= John Brugman =

Dutch Franciscan friar

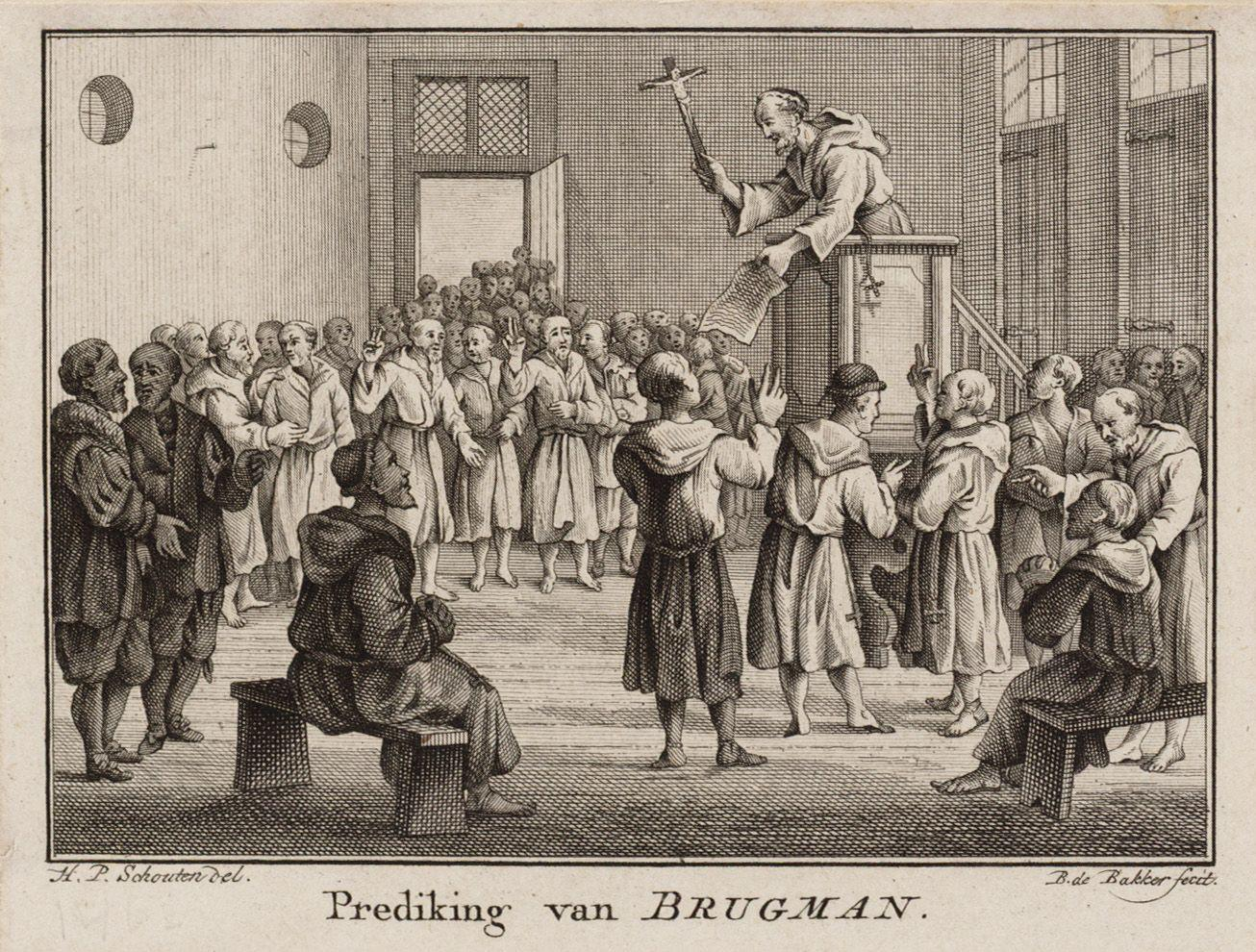
Brugman preaching. Engraving from Hermanus Schouten's Het Vaderlandse Geschiedenis Boek, 1788

John Brugman, was a 15th-century Franciscan friar who became a renowned preacher in the Netherlands.

== Biography ==
Brugman was born at Kempen in the Electorate of Cologne, towards the end of the preceding century. He became a lector of theology, Vicar Provincial and one of the founders of the Cologne Province of the Observants, a reformed branch of the Friars Minor. For twenty years his name was celebrated as the most illustrious preacher of the Low Countries. The saying still exists in that region, "to speak like Brugman", meaning to speak eloquently. A friend of Denis the Carthusian, it was at his suggestion that the latter wrote his work: De doctrinâ et regulis vitae Christianæ, dedicating it to Brugman. Brugman also supported the foundation of the Brothers of the Common Life, a congregation devoted to education, established by two priests, Gerhard Groote and Florentius Radewiyns. He addressed them in the two letters which are still extant to strengthen them in the persecution to which they were subjected.

Brugman died at Nijmegen in the odour of sanctity on 19 September 1473 and is commemorated in the Martyrologium Minoritico-Belgicum.

== Works ==
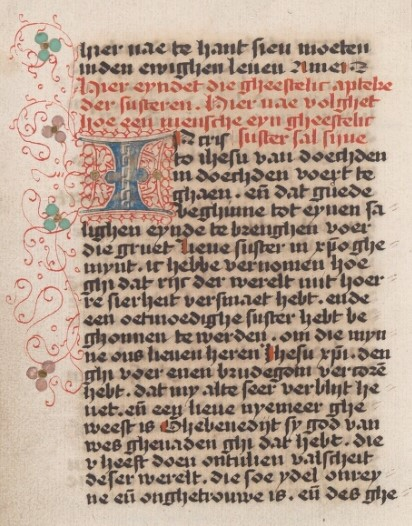
Excerpt from the manuscript "Devote tractaten in het Middelnederlands" of Johannes Brugman. Manufactured in Maaseik, 1476. Preserved in the University Library of Ghent.

Brugman wrote two lives of Lidwina, the first of which, printed at Cologne in 1433, was reprinted anonymously at Louvain in 1448. The second life appeared at Schiedam in 1498. Both included by the Bollandists in the Acta Sanctorum for 14 April. Brugman ranked among the best poets of his day. Two of his poems "O Ewich is so lanc!" and "The Zielejacht" are included by Hoffmann von Fallersleben in his "Horae Belgicae" (II, 36, 41.). His biography was written by Willem Moll under the title "Joannes Brugman en het Godsdienstegen Leven Onzer Vaderen in de Vijftiende eeuw", and published at Amsterdam in 1854. It consists of two volumes, the second containing Brugman's unedited works.

== Sources ==
- Catholic Encyclopedia
