= Martin Plum =

German politician (born 1982)

Member of the Bundestag
- Incumbent
- Assumed office 2021

Personal details
- Born: 26 February 1982 (age 44) Mönchengladbach
- Party: CDU

Martin Plum (born 26 February 1982) is a German politician for the CDU. Plum was born in the West German town of Mönchengladbach and was elected to the Bundestag in 2021.
