= Udo Schiefner =

German politician (1959–2025)

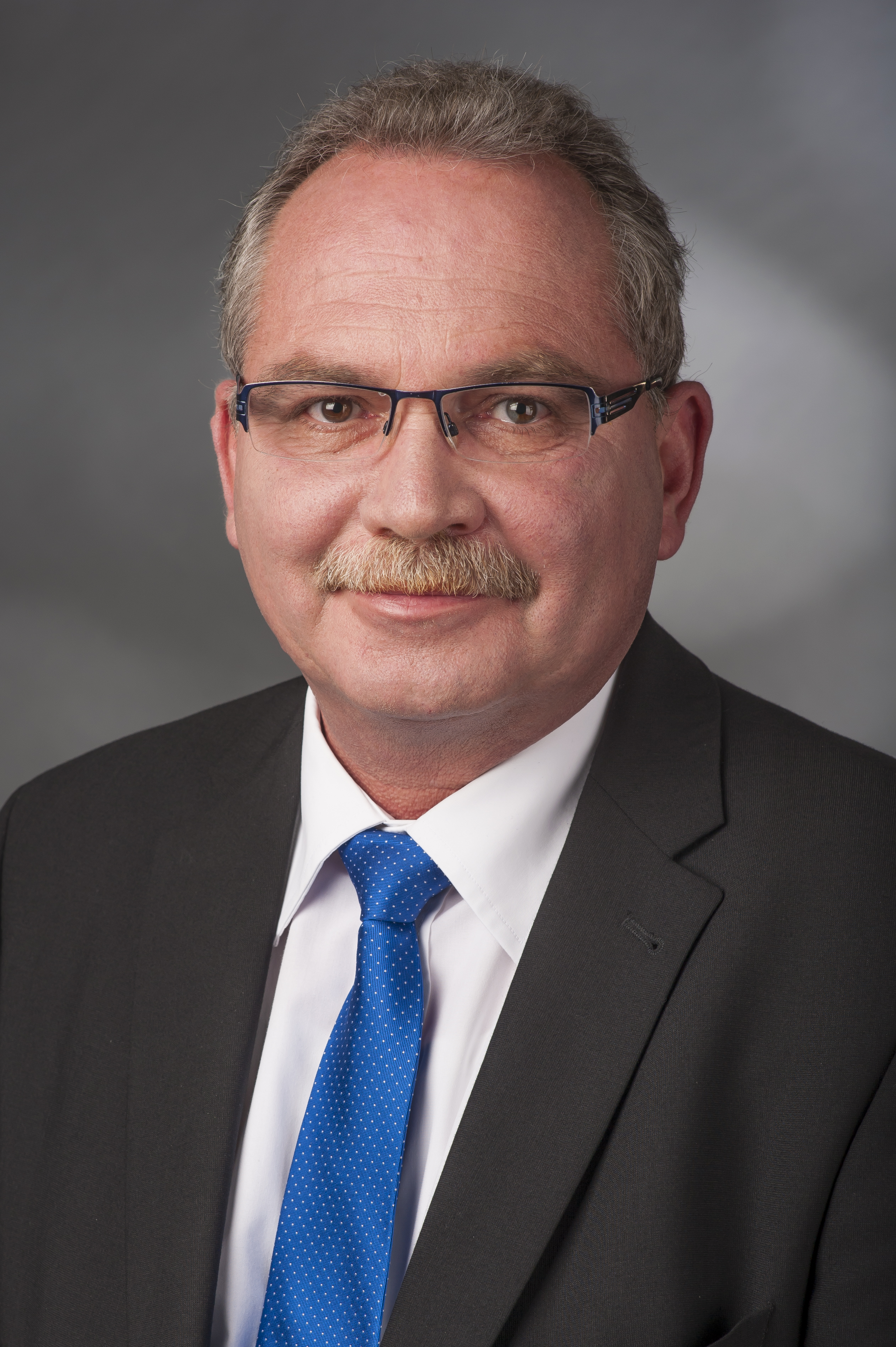
- Schiefner in 2014

Member of the Bundestag
- In office 2013–2025

Personal details
- Born: 7 August 1959 Kempen, North Rhine-Westphalia, West Germany (now Germany)
- Died: 9 October 2025 (aged 66)
- Party: SPD
- Education: Berlin University of Applied Sciences and Technology

Udo Schiefner (7 August 1959 – 9 October 2025) was a German politician of the Social Democratic Party (SPD) who served as a member of the Bundestag from the state of North Rhine-Westphalia from 2013 to 2025.

== Political career ==
Schiefner first became a member of the Bundestag in the 2013 German federal election. He joined the SPD in 1975 and was elected chairman of the SPD Niederrhein in February 2021. In parliament, he was the chair of the Committee on Transport and Digital Infrastructure and a member of the Committee on Petitions.

In addition to his committee assignments, Schiefner was part of the German-Dutch Parliamentary Friendship Group from 2022 to 2025.

In July 2024, Schiefner announced that he would not stand in the 2025 federal elections but instead resign from active politics by the end of the parliamentary term.

He also served as a member of the advisory board for Action Medeor.

Schiefner died on 9 October 2025, at the age of 66.
