= Bernhard van Treeck =

German psychiatrist (born 1964)

Bernhard van Treeck (born 5 February 1964, Kempen, Niederrhein) is a German psychiatrist and has led a clinic specialised in addictions and drug-dependency. As an author he has written several books on graffiti, street-art, drugs and addiction.

== Works ==
- Piratenkunst (Pirate art 1994)
- Das große Graffiti-Lexikon (The big graffiti lexicon)
- Street-Art Berlin – legale und illegale Kunst im Stadtbild (1999)
- Street-Art Köln – legale und illegale Kunst im Stadtbild (1996)
- Wandzeichnungen (Wall-drawings)
- Writer-Lexikon – American Graffiti (1995)
- Pochoir- die Kunst des Schablonengraffiti (Pochoir -The art of stencil graffiti, 2000, with S. Metze-Prou)
- Graffiti-Art #8 (1998)
- Graffiti Art Deutschland #9 (1998)
- Hall of Fame – Writing in Deutschland (1995, with M. Todt)
- Wholecars – Graffiti auf Zügen (Wholecars – Graffiti on trains, 1996)
- Graffiti-Kalender, edition aragon (editor 1991–1997)
- Partydrogen (Party drugs, 1997)
- Der Drogennotfall (The drug case)
- Drogen- und Suchtlexikon (Lexicon of drugs and addictions)
- Das große cannabis-Lexikon (The big cannabis Lexicon, 2000)
- Drogen (Drugs)
- Collaborated on Graffiti-Dortmund and Arbeiten zur Spraybanane 1986–1996 (Works on the spray banana).
