= Kanal III C =

River in Germany

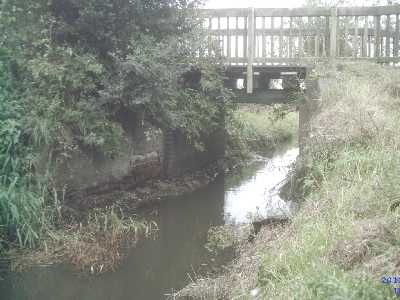
- Kanal III C River - Bridged by an ancient Railway Viaduct near Süchteln, Germany. 2010

Specifications
- Length: 4.9 km (3.0 miles)

Geography
- End point: Kanal III3b (51.3108°N 6.3789°E)

Kanal III C is a drainage canal of North Rhine-Westphalia, Germany. It discharges into the Niers via the Kanal III3b near Grefrath.
