= Willicher Fleuth =

River in Germany

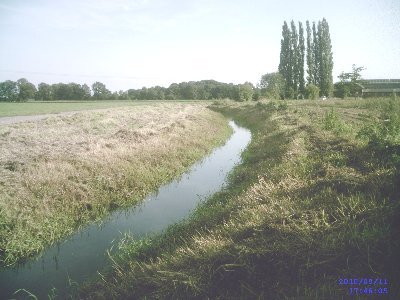

Location
- Country: Germany
- State: North Rhine-Westphalia

Physical characteristics
- Mouth
  - location: Kanal III3b
  - coordinates: 51.3012°N 6.3963°E
- Length: 13.1 km (8.1 mi)

Basin features
- Progression: Kanal III3b→ Niers→ Meuse→ North Sea

Willicher Fleuth is a river of North Rhine-Westphalia, Germany. It discharges into the Kanal III3b near Tönisvorst.

== See also ==
- List of rivers of North Rhine-Westphalia
