= Johannes Buns =

Dutch Golden Age painter

Johannes Buns (before 1640 – after 1673), was a Dutch Golden Age painter.

== Biography ==
According to Houbraken who repeated the verses of the poets Pieter Rixtel of Haarlem and Johannes Blasius, he was a good portrait painter. Houbraken did not see any of his works.

According to the RKD Buns was a pupil of Govert Flinck in Amsterdam before 1660. In March 1661, Buns and Sophia Lefebre baptized a son Ferdinand in the Roman Catholic Mozes en Aäronkerk in that city. He was known for his portraits and a portrait of an unknown woman dated 1667 has been registered to him. Buns moved to Cologne, where on June 10, 1668, he became a member of the local artist's guild. There Sophia and he baptized three daughters, the last one in August 1673. The University of Amsterdam's ECARTICO project suggests he was the brother of the priest and composer Benedictus Buns, alias Benedictus a Sancto Josepho (1643–1716), who was born in Geldern.
