= Dondert =

River in Germany

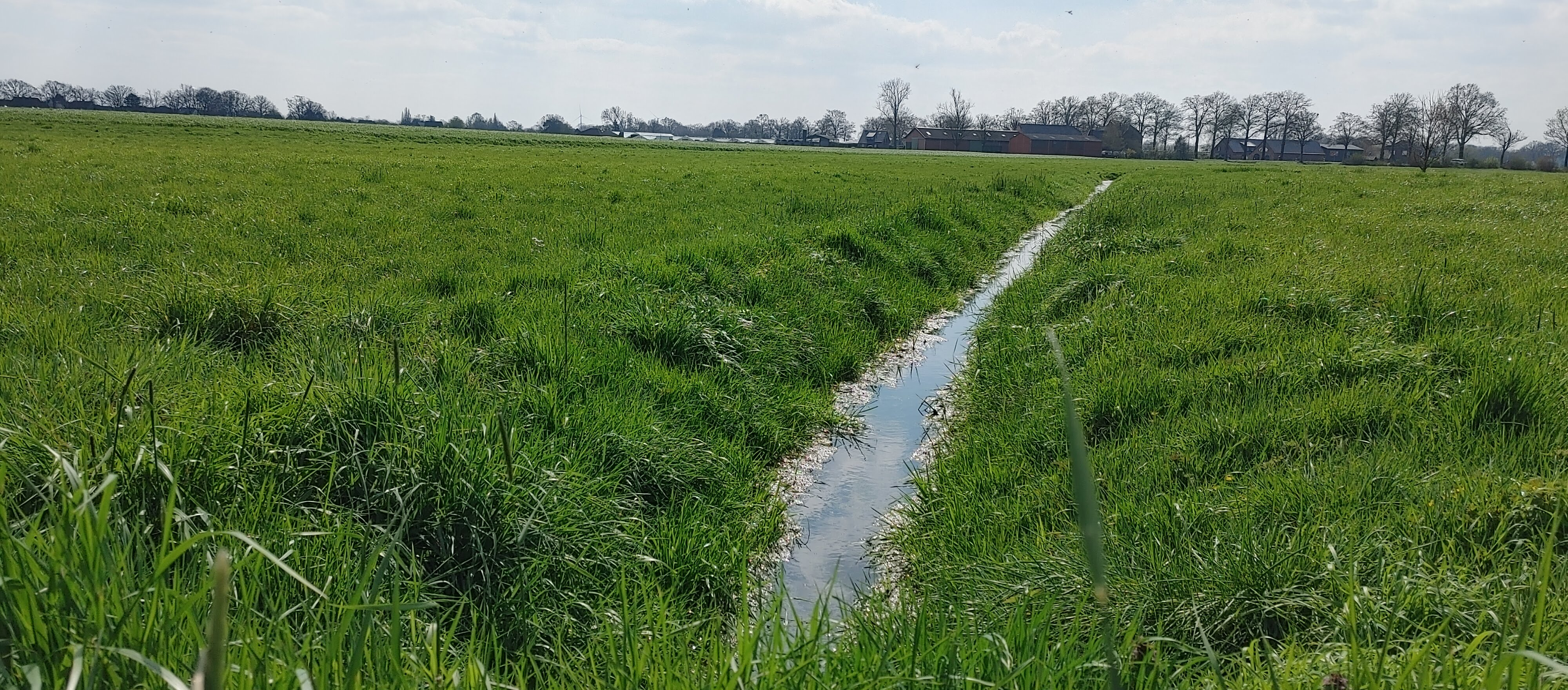
- Dondert stream on the left bank of the Lower Rhine, between Geldern and Kevelaer on the B9 highway

Location
- Country: Germany
- State: North Rhine-Westphalia

Physical characteristics
- Mouth
  - location: Niers
  - coordinates: 51.5944°N 6.2478°E

Basin features
- Progression: Niers→ Meuse→ North Sea

Dondert is a river of North Rhine-Westphalia, Germany. It is 9.8 km long and flows into the Niers near Kevelaer.

== See also ==
- List of rivers of North Rhine-Westphalia
