= Hammer Bach =

River in Germany

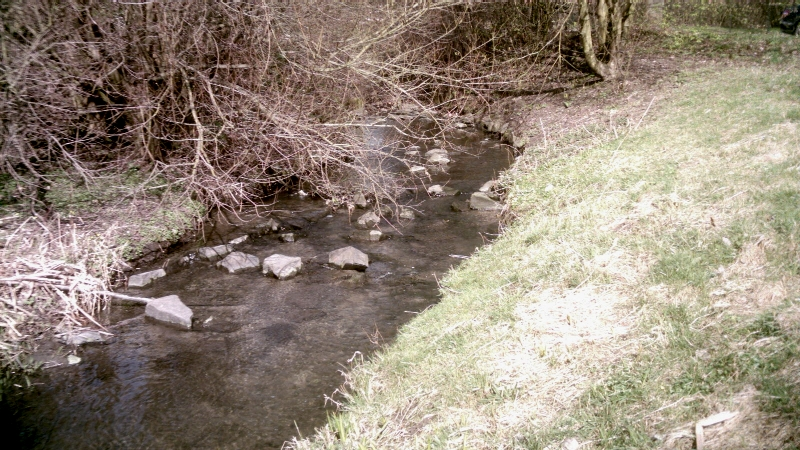

Location
- Country: Germany
- States: North Rhine-Westphalia

Physical characteristics
- Mouth
  - location: Niers
  - coordinates: 51.2603°N 6.4367°E

Basin features
- Progression: Niers→ Meuse→ North Sea

Hammer Bach is a small river of North Rhine-Westphalia, Germany. It is 6.7 km long and flows into the Niers near Viersen.

== See also ==
- List of rivers of North Rhine-Westphalia
