= Gelderner Fleuth =

River in Germany

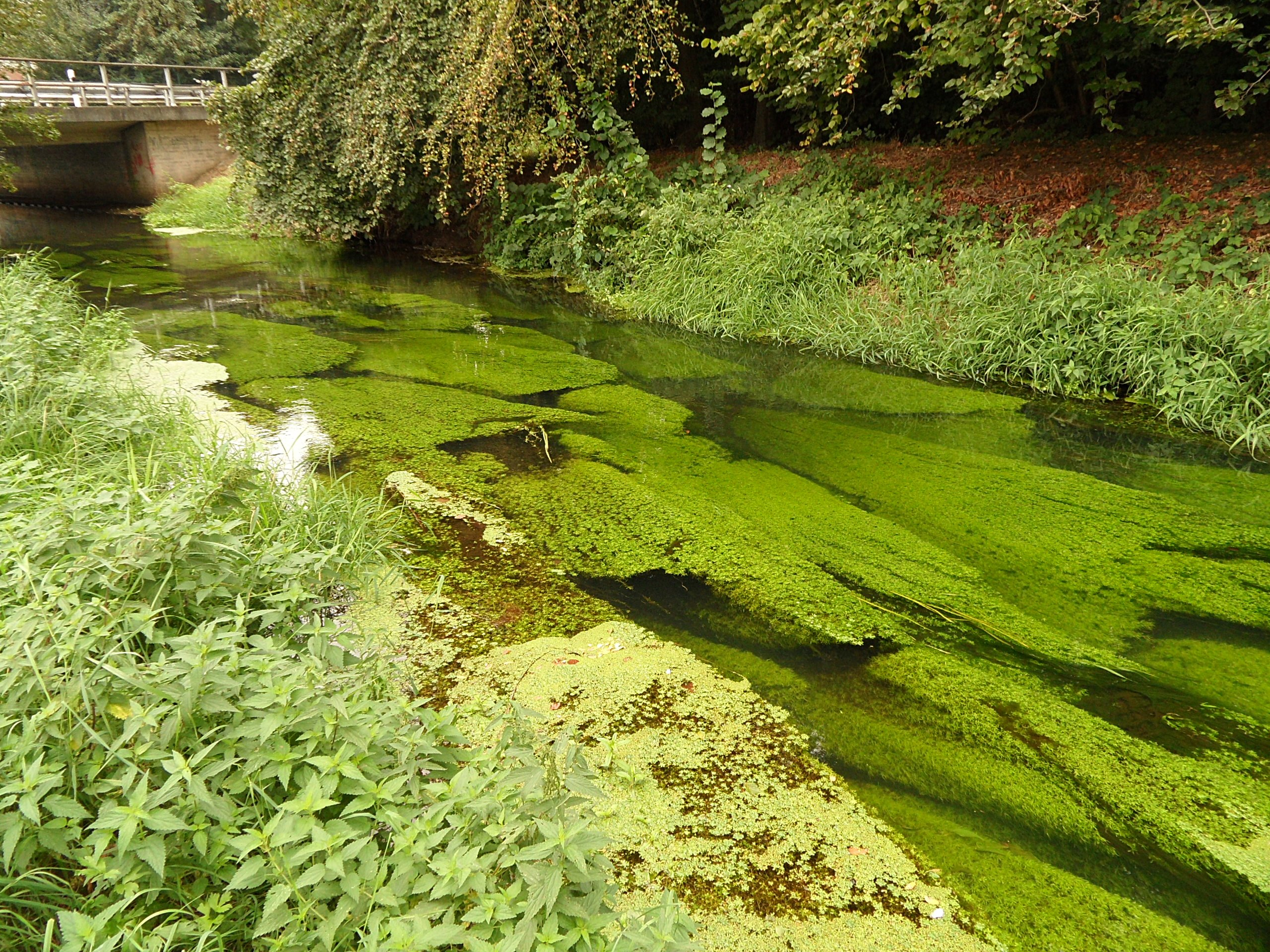

Location
- Country: Germany
- State: North Rhine-Westphalia

Physical characteristics
- Mouth
  - location: Niers
  - coordinates: 51.5480°N 6.3140°E
- Length: 27.0 km (16.8 mi)

Basin features
- Progression: Niers→ Meuse→ North Sea

Gelderner Fleuth (pronounced: [fløːt]) is an approximately 27.0 km (16.8 mi) long, non-navigable, tributary of the Niers in North Rhine-Westphalia, Germany. It rises in the village of An der Gastendonk, which belongs to the city of Kempen, flows first west and then turns north east of Wachtendonk to flow into the Niers near the city of Geldern, which gives it its name.

The creek designated as Gelderner Fleuth on the water station map has its source in the ditch system of the Gastendonk cultural monument in Kempen. The topographical maps still call the creek here Schwarze Rahm (Black Rahm). After a few meters, the Fliethgraben flows in from the left, which connects the stream with the Flöthbach. The Black Rahm flows west and south past a lake, then picks up the counterflowing Uhlesrahm on the left, turns north, flows west of the lake and then picks up an unnamed stream from the right, turning west again; here the river code number changes from 28641 to 28643. The Black Rahm then curves north and changes its name to Spring in the Eyller Bruch. Only after the confluence with the Landwehrbach is it also referred to as Gelderner Fleuth on topographical maps.

== See also ==
- List of rivers of North Rhine-Westphalia
