= Kohm =

Kohm may refer to:

- Köhm, a small river in North Rhine-Westphalia, Germany.
- Kohm Lady Godiva, a 1980s United States human-powered aircraft.
- kOhm — an unofficial way of writing kΩ or kiloohm; one thousand ohms.
- KOHM, a Californian radio station.
