= Grift (Fossa Eugeniana) =

River in Germany

Specifications
- Length: 5.7 km (3.5 miles)

Geography
- End point: Ponter Dondert (51.5103°N 6.2843°E)

Grift is a drainage canal of North Rhine-Westphalia, Germany. It discharges into the Ponter Dondert near Geldern. It is part of the Fossa Eugeniana, a planned 17th century canal that was to connect the Meuse near Venlo with the Rhine near Rheinberg.
