= Köhm =

River in Germany

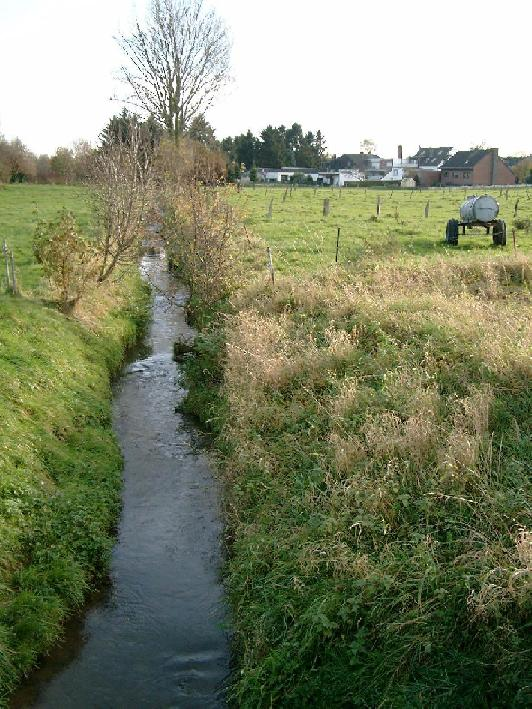

Location
- Country: Germany
- States: North Rhine-Westphalia

Physical characteristics
- Mouth
  - location: Niers
  - coordinates: 51°05′17″N 6°24′21″E

Basin features
- Progression: Niers→ Meuse→ North Sea

Köhm (German pronunciation: [ˈkøːm]) is a small river of North Rhine-Westphalia, Germany. It is 4.4. km long and flows into the Niers near Erkelenz-Keyenberg. Its upper course no longer exists due to lignite mining (Garzweiler surface mine).

== Course ==
The original source of the Köhm was in the area between Garzweiler and Kaiskorb. Here, at an altitude of 120 m above sea level, was the watershed between the Erft (Rhine) and the Rur/Niers (Meuse). From here, the Köhm flowed north past Alt-Otzenrath. The area between Garzweiler and Otzenrath is now in the excavated area of the open-cast mine.

Heading from Otzenrath, the Köhm runs in a west-east direction in a narrow valley at an altitude of 74 to 78 m above sea level through the village of Borschemich, then north of Keyenberg directly past the former knight's estate Haus Keyenberg to finally flow into the Niers.

It is only a flowing body of water after heavy rainfall and when the snow melts. Some of the water is fed in by drainage measures for the Garzweiler open-cast mine. From the entrance to Borschemich, the Köhm is canalized and only flows openly again from Marienstiftstraße next to the parish house. In the past, the Köhm in Borschemich fed the ditch system of Haus Paland; a part of the ditches is still preserved. In the past, water also flowed into the Köhm from the ditch system of Haus Keyenberg, which in turn was fed by springs.

== 'Köhm-Lied' ==
A traditional song exists about the Köhm river in the Borschemich dialect of German:

Kütt dr Sonndachnommedach
wehs kehner us noch en
löf dat Dres de Stros eraf
flöck nom Onkel hin
säht em dann jet in et Uer
hei dat wütt jemaat
hei dat jöff en Sondertour
hei dat jöff en Fahrt
Jo mir fahre med nem Böötche ob dr Kue´hm
allemole un et Dres mit singem Ühem
un dat Dres dat kritt dr zedder
be demm janz glitter
jo no Mod - jo no Mod - jo no Mod
allemole op dem klene Paddelboot !

== See also ==
- List of rivers of North Rhine-Westphalia
