= Fossa Eugeniana =

Fortified canal in Europe

Coordinates: 51.5094°N 6.5339°E

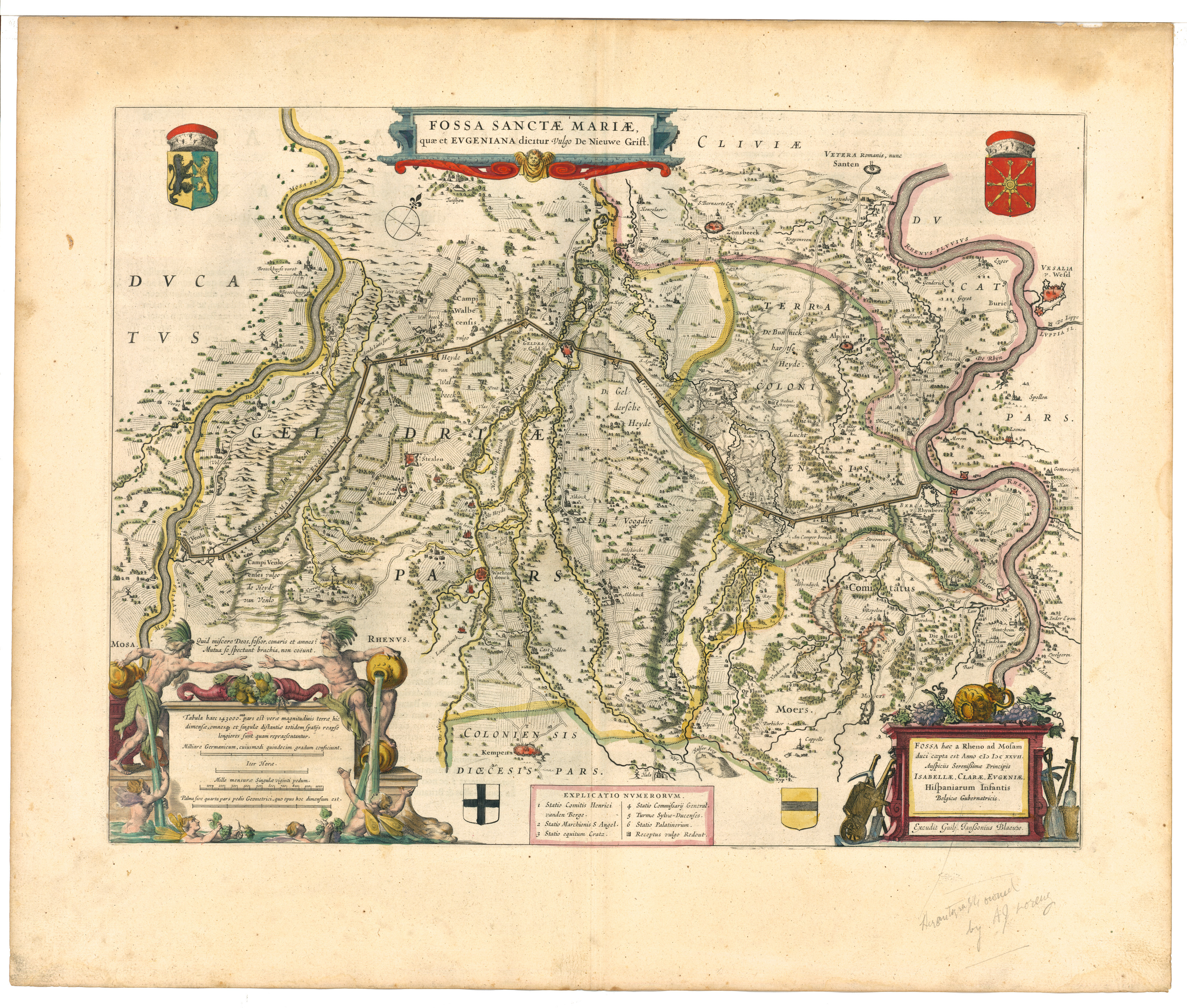
View of the Fossa Eugeniana

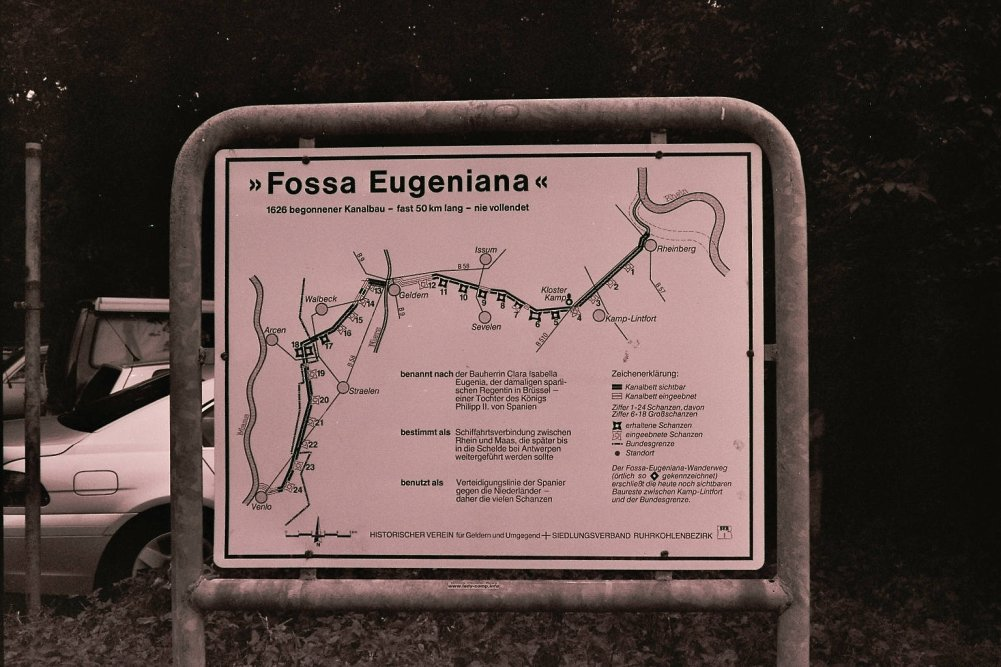
Street sign with the way to Fossa Eugeniana

The Fossa Eugeniana or Spanish Rhine-Maas canal was a large-scale ambitious project of the Spanish-Dutch Eighty Years' War planned by the then Spanish regent in Brussels, Isabella Clara Eugenia, after whom it was named, during the years 1626–1630. It consisted of a fortified canal intended to blockade the United Provinces and to divert trade from the Rhine near Rheinberg just south of Wesel and reroute it to Venlo on the Maas, in Spanish territory. The Spanish Rhine-Maas canal had military importance, when at the time Spanish garrisons in north-western Germany reached their maximum extent, amounting to around fifty fortresses and forts. It was to be 25 metres (82 ft) wide, 1.4 metres (4.6 ft) deep and 45 kilometres (28 mi) long. The Fossa Eugeniana was never finished; a 5.7 km section west of Geldern is in use as drainage canal known as Grift.
