= Geldern-Kapellen =

Kapellen an der Fleuth
- Village
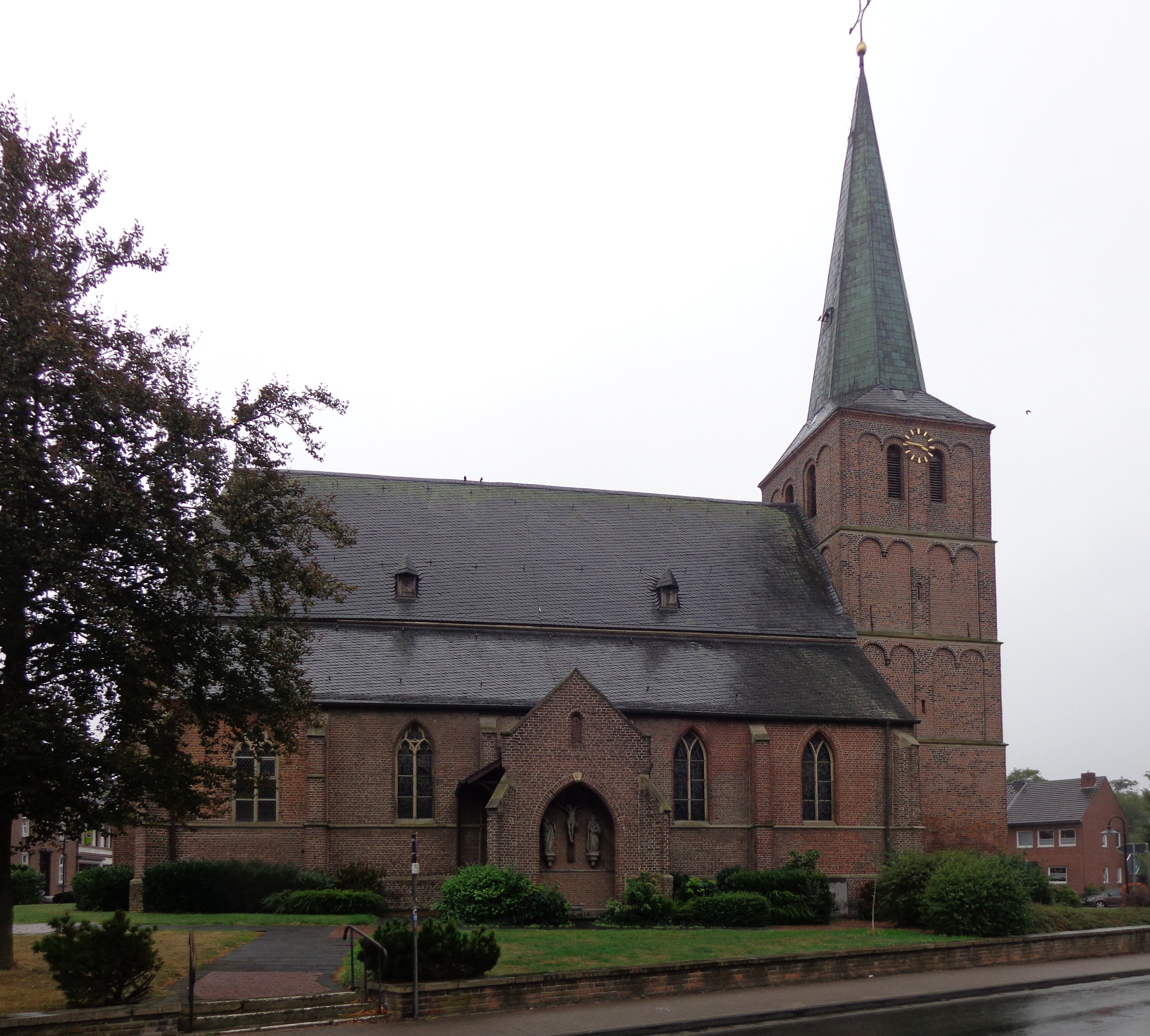
- Geldern-Kapellen Church
- Interactive map of Kapellen an der Fleuth
- Coordinates: 51.5711°N 6.36278°E
- Country: Germany
- Elevation: 27 m (89 ft)

Population
  - Total: 22,711

Kapellen an der Fleuth is a village of about 2700 people in northwest Germany near the border of the Netherlands. Since 1969 the village has been a part of the city of Geldern. Kapellen an der Fleuth lies in the Niederrhein (Lower Rhine) in the northwest part of German Federal State of Nordrhein-Westfalen. The village is approximately 72 kilometres (45 miles) from Düsseldorf, 16 km (10 mi) from the Rhine River at Xanten and 180 km (112 mi) from Amsterdam, Netherlands.

Kapellen an der Fleuth is located in the left (western) bank of the Lower Rhine.

Because there are other European areas named Kapellen/Capellen, in January 2020 the village was renamed with the distinctive name Kapellen an der Fleuth. The village is traversed by the Issumer Fleuth, a tributary to the Niers River.

Towns nearby are Sonsbeck to its north, Kevelaer in its West, northeast is Issum; Geldern is to its south.

The Weeze Airport Niederrhein is just 21 km (13 mi) northwest of Kapellen an der Fleuth. This airport has regular flights around Europe. This airport is also referred to as Düsseldorf-Weeze Airport or Düsseldorf-North Airport.

== History ==
Capelle (Kapellen) was first mentioned in the year 1250. Because the area is on a Roman road of Xanten to Straelen, the area was likely populated well before 1250. The Roman Catholic Church of St. George was mentioned in 1305 in the St. Victor church register in the nearby town of Xanten. The church has records of the names of the assigned village priests since the year 1334.

On 3 March 1336 the knight Luef von Beerenbroeck sold the jurisdiction and the Patron Saint of Kapellen to Rainald II Von Geldern. He had become the feudal lord over the village of Capellen in 1326.

The village has been ravaged by fires. On 11 November 1690 the church burned down completely. On 14 July 1792, 27 houses and 16 barns destroyed by fire. Also affected was the parsonage, the church could be saved. On the eve of the Whit Sunday (Pentecost) 1810 32 houses and 16 barns burned down. The famous farm Beerenbrouck had a large fire in 1908 that helped to initiate the need for a local fire department. In 1908 the Kapellen village volunteer fire department was founded.

From 1798 to 1814 Capellen was under French rule. In 1815 the Congress of Vienna added the area of the Lower Rhine to the Kingdom of Prussia. On 23 April 1816 the Prussian administrative organization added Capellen to the area of Geldern. Geldern was 1 of more than 40 districts of the province of Jülich-Kleves-Berg.

In the 1933 the historical name Capellen was changed to Kapellen. This name change was a part of German Federal spelling reform program. It is thought that German cities with “C” names (such as Crefeld, Cöln/Cologne, Coblenz) were using French or Latin spellings. From 1900 to about 1930's several German city names that started with a “C” were changed to modern “K” spellings, including Köln, Krefeld, Kobelez and Kapellen.

Until 1969 the village of Kapellen had its own government and mayor. On 1 July 1969 there was a municipal restructuring plan; Kapellen and other nearby villages were added to the nearby city of Geldern. As of 2020, the city of Geldern includes the areas (villages) of Kapellen an der Fleuth, Hartefeld, Lüllingen, Vernum, Pont, Veert and Walbeck. Geldern was added to the district of Kleve on 1 January 1975. As of December 2019, Geldern had a population of 33,730.

== Sights ==
Nearby are the Castle Haag (about 6 km) with both its 18 hole and 6-hole short golf course. The Diebels Brewery is in the nearby village of Issum, a distance of 7 km.

Parish church St. George is Gothic Pseudo basilika from the first half the 15th century. The pulpit is from 1714 and the high altar from the year 1888.

The village is known for its annual Karneval parade on the Sunday approximately 10 days before Ash Wednesday. This parade is scheduled in a manner to avoid scheduling conflicts with other nearby fests.

Nearby to the west of Kapellen an der Fleuth there is an 18th-century windmill; this building is outside the village border.

== Castle (Palace) Haag -Schloss Haag ==
The Castle Haag, about 6 km (4 mi) from Kapellen, is a late middle-ages building from the 15th century. The first mention of the house is from 1337. The main house from 1664 was totally destroyed in 1945. The two outer castles arranged one behind the other have been preserved. The front of the two-story inner bailey from 1688 with an approximately square floor plan and a medieval core is flanked by two large round towers with six-sided Gothic pointed helmets. A square tower gate with a Gothic bent helmet originally formed the entrance to the castle.

The Castle Haag, under an agreement dated 29 December 1618, has been owned by the family of Adriaan of Hoensbroech, now in its 12th generation. Since 1995 there is an 6-hole golf course around the Palace.

== Haus Beerenbrouck ==
The Farmhouse Beerenbrouck was first mentioned in 1331. It was rebuilt in its present form, a two-story mansion, around 1800. In 1908 the house in 1908 was partially destroyed by a fire. The fire completely destroyed the barn. The house was added to the list of historical monuments on 15 October 1986 as number A24.
