= Benedictus Buns =

Carmelite priest and composer

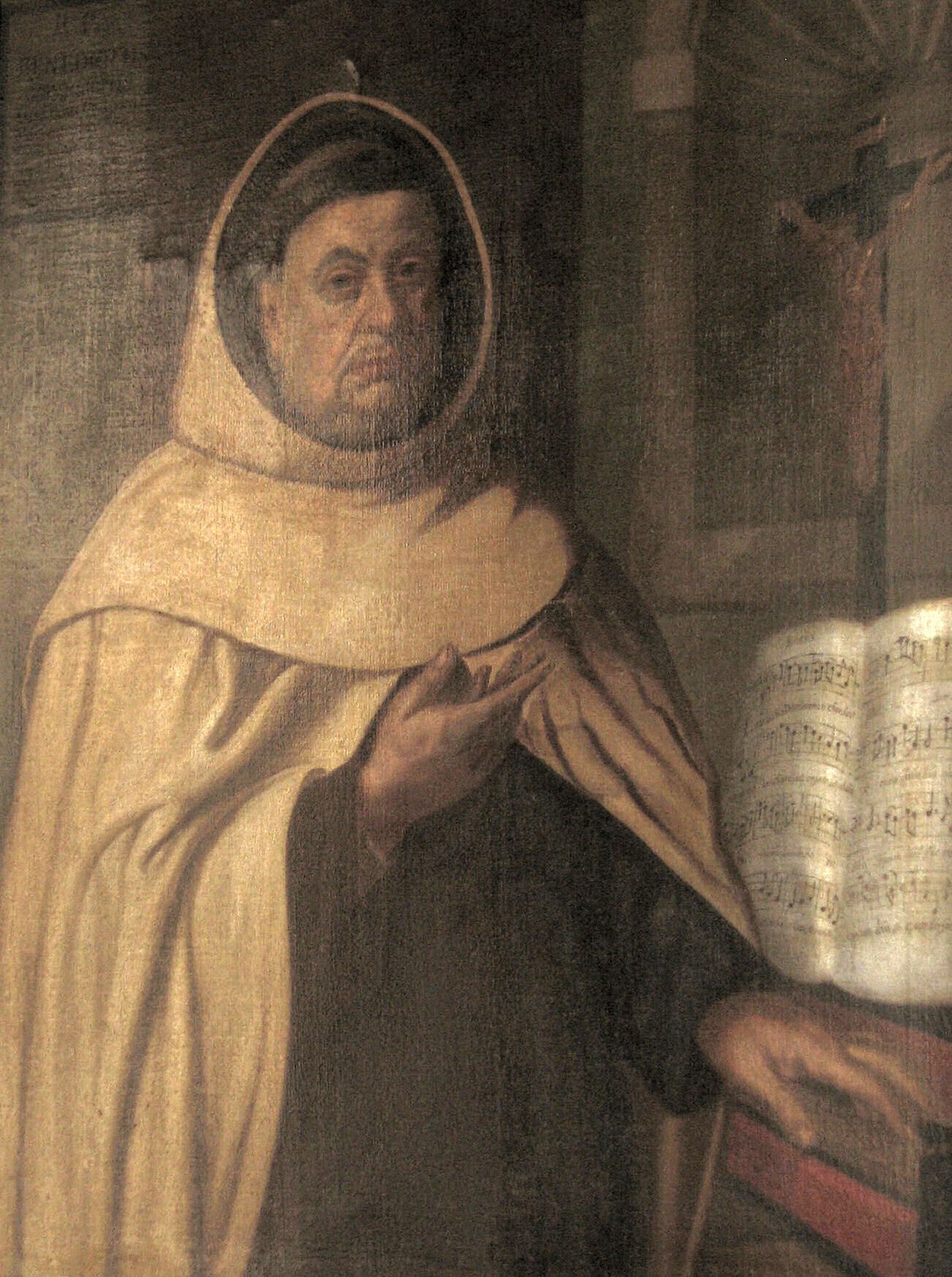
Portrait of Benedictus Buns in the religious habit of the Carmelites

Benedictus Buns, Benedictus à Sancto Josepho (born Josephus Henricus Buns; also Buns Gelriensis in Latin; 1643 – 6 December 1716), was a Carmelite priest and composer.

== Biography ==
Buns was born in Geldern (near Kevelaer), which is now a part of Germany, and died in Boxmeer, the Netherlands. In 1659 Buns entered the monastery of the Carmelites in Geldern. His first name is unknown.

=== Work in Boxmeer ===
Buns was professed in 1660 and was ordained in 1666. Sometime between 1666 and 1671 Buns moved to the monastery of the Carmelites in Boxmeer. He was appointed sub-prior in the periods 1671–1674; 1677–1683; 1692–1701; and 1704–1707. During this length of time he frequently travelled to Mechelen, Antwerp and Brussels to attend Carmelite chapter-meetings. From 1679 until his death he held the position of functionary (titularus) organist in Boxmeer at the Bremser organ, built by Blasius Bremser from Mechelen. As organist, Buns succeeded Hubertus à Sancto Joanne Vlaminck (1633–1679) a well known organist in Boxmeer (from 1668 to 1679). The Basilica at Boxmeer was part of an independent Catholic enclave.

In 1688, Buns initiated the completion and expansion (under-Positive) of the Bremser organ in Boxmeer by Jan van Dijck.

From 1699 onward, Buns worked as private composer, conductor and organist ("Aulae Bergis phonascus et organista") - to the Count Oswaldo van den Bergh at Boxmeer and the family van den Bergh at 's-Heerenbergh. Buns was also an organ-expert and an organ-advisor, and In 1703 he approved the Ruprecht (III) organ which was built in the chapel of the nunnery of the Carmelites Elsendael in Boxmeer. In 1706 he advised the manufacture and implementation of the new organ in the monastery in Geldern.

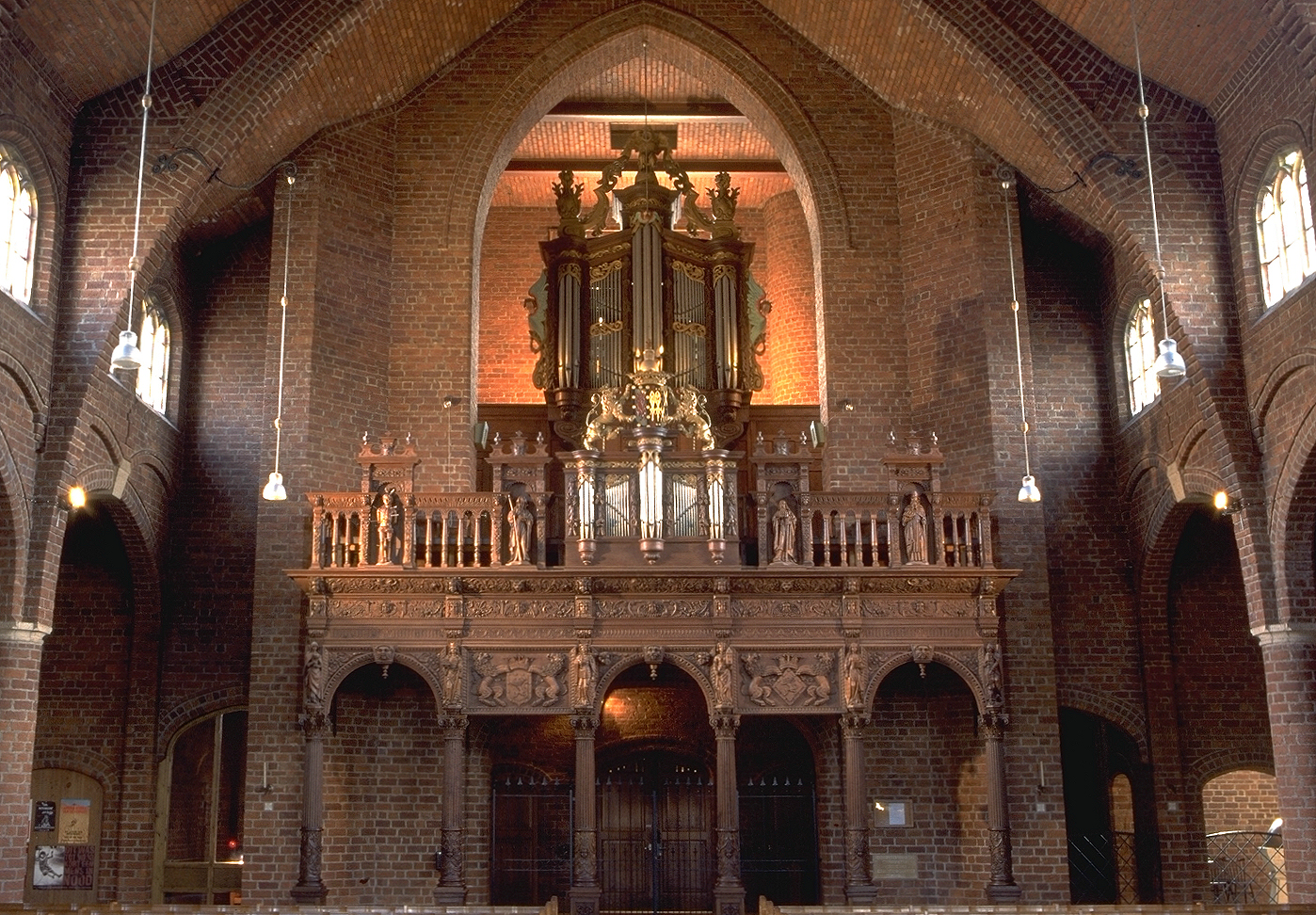
The famous organ in the Basilica of Boxmeer where Buns played.

== Death and legacy ==
Buns died on 6 December 1716 in Boxmeer, and was buried in the halls of the monastery. and was succeeded by Cecilius à Sancto Gerardo.

In the necrology of the Carmelite monastery in Boxmeer is recorded: "6. December obiit P. Benedictus à Sancto Josepho alias Buns, Gelriensis, quondam subprior, organista ac Musiciae componista famosissimus."

In France, Buns was granted with a title of honour ”le grand Carme”. The Dutch musicologist Frits Noske has done a remarkable job to make accessible the total oeuvre by Buns. In 1967, a first Benedictus Buns Memorial was held in Boxmeer initiated by conductor Theo Lamée and Carmelite friar Paulus Schmitt. In 1968 a simple marble plaquette was unveiled in the hall of the monastery in Boxmeer in remembering and honouring the Carmelite Benedictus Buns. In 2001 a second Benedictus Buns Memorial in Boxmeer was initiated and executed by conductor Hans Smout in the castle and in the basilica at Boxmeer.

== Music ==
Much of Buns's work has survived, including motets, litanies, masses, pieces for chorus and instruments, as well as 14 instrumental sonatas.

Buns published nine opus numbers (I-IX) between 1666 and 1721. Books were published by Petrus Phalesius, Antwerp, opus I–III; by Lucas de Potter, Antwerp, opus IV and V; by Arnold van Eynden, Utrecht opus VI; by Hendrik Aertssens, Antwerp, opus VII; and by Estienne Roger, Amsterdam, opus VIII-IX. The two editions of Gregorian chant and his opus I-VII and IX contains a large amount of liturgical music. His opus VIII contains only instrumental music. Of the nine opus numbers, seven have survived complete.

Even after his death (1716) opus numbers were published. Those opus numbers I up to IX published during his life consist out of 123 surviving compositions, among others 109 religious vocal compositions with instruments. We know for instance of 11 Masses, 2 Requiem motets, 2 Magnificats, 5 Lauretanic Litany, Litany of the blessed Virgin, 8 Tantum ergos, 11 Salve Reginas, 4 Regina Caelis, 1 Te Deum, some Ave Marias, 2 Missa pro defunctis, Ave Regina caelorum, 1 Alma Redemptoris Mater, 11 little Oratorios with free religious text and compositions for Beata Maria Virgine, Sancto Josepho, Sancto vel sancto, Sanctissimo Sacramento and many other religious occasions. Buns's work reflects of course his activities in the service of his order.

Furthermore, Buns composed 13 trio sonatas for 2 Violins, Viola da Gamba and Basso Continuo (Bass viola and organ) which were published in 1698 in his opus VIII with the title: Orpheus Elianus è Carmelo in Orbem Editus a 2 Viol. et Basso viola cum Basso Continuo. These compositions were dedicated to Count Oswald van den Bergh Boxmeer and his wife Maria Leopoldina van Oost-Friesland-Rittburg. Opus V and Opus VII by Buns were also dedicated to Count Oswald van Bergh.

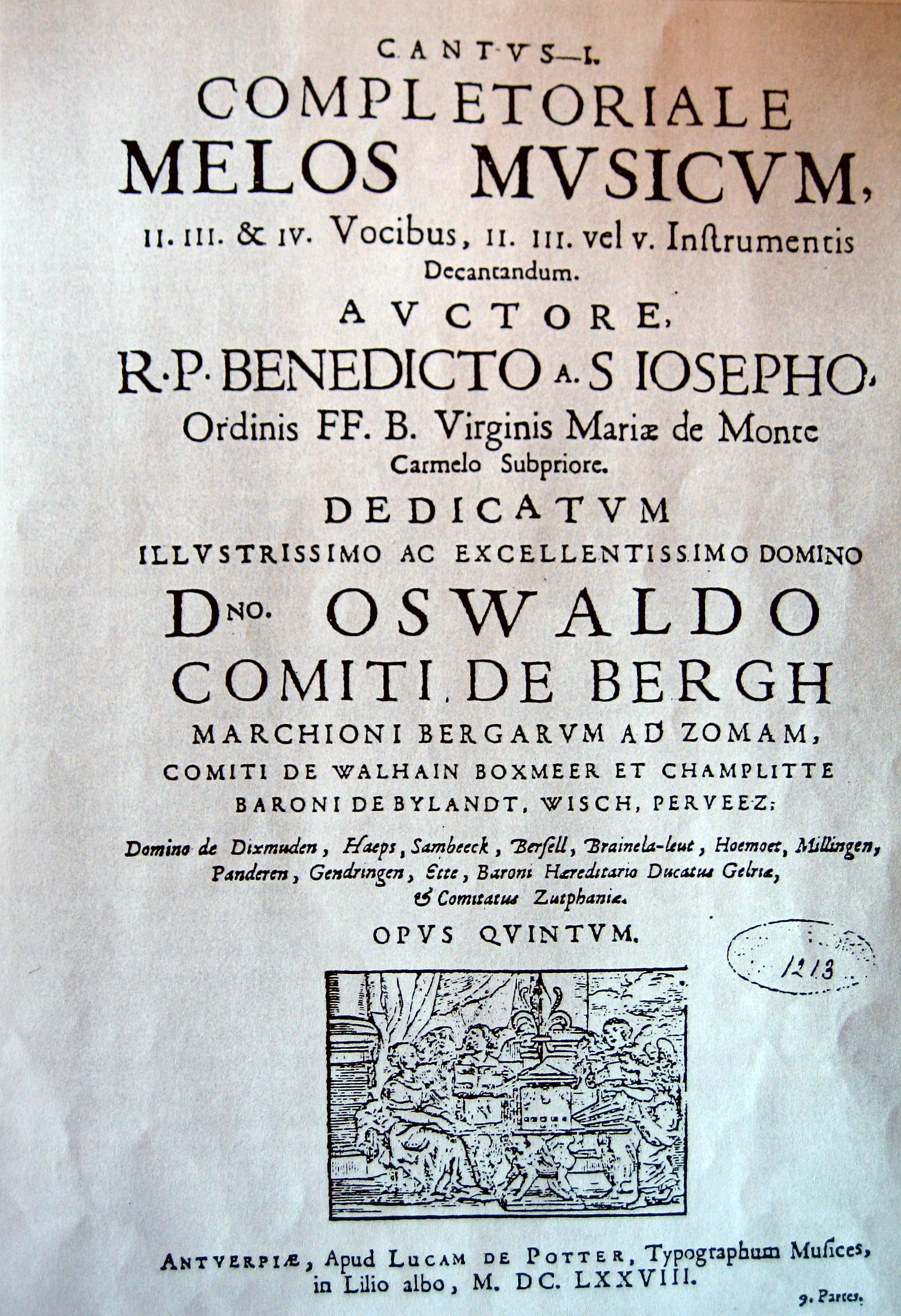
Dedication of the Opus V to Count Oswald van Bergh

The 14th instrumental sonata is sonata finalis No. 15 opus V. This Sonata finalis has two instrumental choirs with basso continuo and is representative of the modern concerto principle of the time. It is possible that Buns composed another 14th sonata, because other instrumental works have been lost also. His last opus IX was published in 1701.

Buns also studied and practised the Gregorian chorals and chants from two volumes published in Antwerp and Brussels (Plantin Antwerp, 1711) and (Ludovicus de Quantinne Brussels, 1721). He specifically collected these two volumes of Gregorian songs for the liturgical practice in the monastery of Fratrum Beata Virginae Mariae Monte Carmelo Boxmeriensis, first the "Processionale juxta usum Fratrum Beatae Virginae Mariae de Monte Carmelo" and second "Manuale Chori ad usum Fratrum Beatae Virginae Mariae de Monte Carmelo". These two books showing theoretically and musically amendments by Buns. Much of his compositions (voice-books) no scores are available were laid-down and found in libraries of Amsterdam, Utrecht (city), Brussels, Antwerp, Geldern, Boxmeer, Paris, Zürich, Vienna, Uppsala.

== Style and evaluation ==
Buns's compositions are very important for Dutch religious music. Buns's religious compositions have to be judged against the background of the spiritual life of the Carmelites.

For Buns style is characteristic the structure from proportionally short pieces, with changing beat and speed bars. The motets on Latin texts are of a meditative nature. Further a homophone setting kind of the Primus in the upper voice, as well as larding also instrumental components in prelude and interlude plays under the designation: Symphonia, Sonata, Ritornello. However he wrote brilliant concertando masses, for instance Missa Secunda opus I for 6 vocibus, 4 vocibus in repiëno et instrumenti.

Buns uses text in the motets of literal excerpts from the Holy Scriptures, partly too of paraphrases of the Scriptures and his own additions in meditative style. The new created texts by poets in the 17th century are inspiration for Buns’ motets. Even literal quotations from the Scriptures text are treated by Buns in an oratical way. The instrumental part is in the first phase according to conservative habit written in three or five part, only rarely four part after more modern view. The chosen instrumentation by Buns consists of violins, alto and tenor violins, viola, viola di gamba, bass viola, violoncello, bassoon, and basso continuo, usually organ with bass-violins, sometimes with trombones. But to the contrary in sonata finalis nr. 15 opus V Buns composed for two instrumental choirs with basso continuo. This composition is representative of the modern concerto principle used by Buns. The 13 sonatas of opus VIII are written in outstanding virtuoso Baroque idiom, with some southern tint. This opus VIII - Orpheus Elianus e Carmelo in orbem editus - is an example of Dutch music from that time period. Orpheus Elianus refers to the Prophet Elijah, so he did in his opus VII, Elijah the spiritual inspiration for the founders and members of the order of Carmelites to which Buns belonged.

These 13 trio sonatas opus VIII have a clear affinity with the sonata da chiesa by Corelli. They exist from short, in each other overflowing particles, often in five parts Adagio – Allegro – Adagio – Allegro – Adagio. In the same slightly one possibly the sonata finalis nr. 15 opus V for two violin choirs has to be considered as an excellent instrumental motet. Extremely surprisingly and ingenious is the alternating play between chorus I (violin 1 and 2, viola and viola di gamba) and chorus II (violin 1 and 2, viola, tenor-violin and dulciano/fagotto) having been supported by the continuo (organ, clavichord and double-bass).

The opus VIII as a whole exhibits a logical tonal system. The first six sonatas follow the circle of fifths in the minor keys, starting from c through g, d, a, and e to b. Sonata no. 7 starts in F♯ minor but modulates to E♭ major. The last six sonatas nr. 8 up to 13 continue through the circle of fifths, but now in the major keys, from E♭, through B♭, F, C, G and to D. The chosen harmonic structure is interesting and lends this opus VIII a tough architecture.

Buns is strongly influenced by Italian composers from his time, for instance Bassani and Degli Antonii. It could be Buns had some contacts with musicians of the Italian Carmelites. Unfortunately it is unknown who was Buns' music-teacher in Geldern. In the Carmelite monastery of Geldern were at that time two organs placed in the monastery-church. The Carmelites at that time had a high skill of the art of music. Perhaps a chapel-master out of Cologne? Because there exists proven contacts between the family/Count van den Bergh ‘s-Heerenbergh and chapel-masters of Cologne like Carl Rosier (1640-1725) and even the Flemish Carolus Hacquart (ca. 1640-1671). It is likely they worked in ‘s-Heerbergh. Buns’ music is based on the principles and style of the Venetian School at the beginning of the 17th century and Buns’ oeuvre has some similarity to Monteverdi and even comparison to Marc-Antoine Charpentier and Corelli can be adduced. Although Buns wrote almost exclusively religious music he has considered as the most important Dutch composer in the second half of the 17th century.

== Character of the era in which Buns lived and worked ==
Buns lived and worked in the time when the barony of Boxmeer was divided into numerous small territories which fell under various jurisdictions, with the exception of the Calvinistic Republic, known as “Vrije heerlijkheid” (literally "free manor") an autonomous area in the Calvinistic Republic of the Seven United Netherlands. Boxmeer had nothing to fear from the Reformation taking place at that time in the Netherlands. Boxmeer was part of the Diocese of Roermond, which by 14 August 1653 granted authorisation to the founding of the convent in Boxmeer.

After the peace of Munster in 1648, Catholics in Brabant had been forced to cede their churches to the new religion, but not in the free enclave of Boxmeer, where the Catholic religion could be confessed freely.

The family of the earls Van den Bergh from 's-Heerenberg stimulated a cultural flowering in Boxmeer. Moreover, some prosperous families, such as Van Odenhoven, De Raet and Hengst, had built country-seats in Boxmeer such as Leucker, De Weijer, and Elsendock. They brought together with the earls Van den Bergh employment of administrative nature in Boxmeer. At the request of Earl Albert Van den Bergh the Flemish Carmelites requested that a Carmelite convent be established in Boxmeer.

In 1652 a donation was sealed to the Flemish Carmelites and the Geldern Carmelites by Earl Albert van den Bergh which consists of two hectare grounds located beside the existing parish church at Boxmeer.

Buns, who composed mainly religious music, flourished in Boxmeer with the support of the Van den Bergh family. Buns composed dedicated music for Madeleine the Cusance, the widow of Earl Albert and for his son, Oswald Van den Bergh. In spite of Buns travelling and his patronage, his music was not broadly spread in the Netherlands, although famous music printers recognised his musical qualities and printed his music, with the exception of Buns' opus VIII - entirely existing from 13 sonatas - which was, however, the only opus published in Amsterdam.

Buns did not remain in the Carmelite convent and was a much-travelled man. The Carmelites backed the Reform of Touraine in 1604 and were strongly in favour of integration of art and education in the convent. A Latin school in Boxmeer opened in 1658 answered guarantor for "artes liberales usque ad rhetoricam" (Liberal Arts and rhetoric), which formed a counterbalance against the reform colleges in the Republic.

The earls Van den Bergh considered this Latin school as a scientific centre and a cultural stronghold. But also the Carmelites had to adhere to the "jurisdictiones, praeeminentias et immunitates" (jurisdiction, primacy and immunity) of the earls Van den Bergh and those stood sometimes on the side of the House of Orange.

== Compositions ==
Published Compositions Voice-books and Gregorian Chants

- Opus I Missae, litaniae, et motetta, IV. V. VI. vocibus cum instrument. et ripienis Antwerp, edited by the heirs of Petrus Phalesius,1666. Two masses, three motets, two litanies, for 5 solo voices, four-part choir, instruments and bc.
- Opus II Corona stellarum duodecim serta, I. II. II. IV. vocibus et instrumentis, editio secunda aucta et emendata. - Antwerp, edited by the heirs of Petrus Phalesius, 1673. First ed. (circa 1670) has been lost. Seven motets, two masses, litany, Salve Regina, Tantum ergo, for 1-4 solo voices and bc.
- Opus III Flosculi musici. - Antwerp, edited by the heirs of Petrus Phalesius, 1672. Fourteen motets, for 1-4 solo voices, instruments and bc.
- Opus IV Musica montana in monte Carmelo composita, cantata in monte Domini, 1. 2. 3. vocibus, & unum Tantum ergo. 4. voc. & 2, 3 vel 5. instrumentis ”Bergh-music”- edited by Lucas de Potter, Antwerp, 1677.
- Opus V Completoriale melos musicum, II. III. & IV. vocibus, II. III. vel V. instrumentis decantandum – edited Antwerp, Lucas de Potter, 1678. Seven motets, four Maria antiphons, litany, two Tantum ergo, for 2-4 solo voices, instruments and bc. and Sonata finalis II choris (double instrumental choirs).
- Opus VI Encomia sacra musice decantanda 1, 2, 3 vocibus et 2, 3, 4. et 5 instrumentis edited Utrecht, Arnold van Eynden, 1683. Nineteen motets, one mass, for 1-3 solo voices TTB, instruments and bc.
- Opus VII Orpheus gaudens et lugens, sive cantica gaudii ac luctus, a 1, 2, 3, 3 & 5 vocibus ac instrumentis compositta. Edited - Antwerp, Hendrick Aertssens, 1693. Fifteen motets for 1-5 solo voices, instruments en bc, four masses for 4-5 solo voices, instruments and bc.
- Opus VIII Orpheus Elianus a Carmelo in orbem editus a 2 violinis et basso viola cum basso continuo, edited Amsterdam, Estienne Roger, 1698. Thirteen trio sonatas, for 2 violins, viola da gamba and bc.
- Opus IX Missa sacris ornata canticis 1. 2. 3. vocibus et 1. 2. 3. 4. et 5 instrumentis, edited Amsterdam, Estienne Roger, 1701. One mass for 3 solo voices, ten motets for 1-3 solo voices, instruments and bc.
- Gregorian Chants Processionale juxta usum Fratrum Beatae Virginae Mariae de Monte Carmelo edited in Antwerp by Plantiniana, 1711.
- Gregorian Chants Manuale Chori ad usum Fratrum Beatae Virginae Mariae de Monte Carmelo edited in Brussels by Ludovicus de Quainne 1721.

== Recordings of Benedictus Buns' work ==
=== Instrumental music ===
- NM Classics 92131. Recorded 2003. Ensemble Séverin: All 13 instrumental Triosonatas, 1 - 13 by Benedictus Buns for two Violins, Viola da Gamba and Bc (in this performance organ). opus VIII, 1698, Orpheus Elianus edited by Estienne Roger, Amsterdam.
- LP ”400 Years Dutch Music nr. 2.”: 1979 Residentie-orchestra conducted by Ton Koopman: Sonata finalis nr. 15 out of Completoriale Melos Musicum, Buns opus V.
- CD Brilliant Classics 93100, Music from the Golden Age of Rembrandt, recorded 2005 and released January 2007. Musica Amphion, Pieter-Jan Belder conductor, Music from the Time of Rembrandt.
- CD Brabants Muzyk Collegie Brabants Muzyk Collegie (Dutch text), Brabantse Barokmuziek. Recorded 1998. Performers: Eindhovens Vocaal Ensemble and Brabants Muzyk Collegie, conductor & organist Ruud Huijbregts. A private edition. Triosonate nr 3 Opus VIII and Sonata finalis nr. 15 out of Completoriale Melos Musicum, Buns opus V.

=== Religious vocal music ===
- Four Dutch composers of the Golden Age. Recorded 1995. Ensemble Bouzignac, Utrecht, Erik Van Nevel.Vanguard Classics 99126.
- Saints & Sinners. Capella Figuralis. Recorded 1998. Cappella Figuralis, Jos van Veldhoven. CCS 12498.
- Brabantse Barokmuziek. Recorded 1998. Performers: Eindhovens Vocaal Ensemble, conductor & organist Ruud Huijbregts. A private edition.Eindhovens Vocaal Ensemble (Dutch text),
- De Profundis Clamavi, released October 2006. L’Armonia Sonora, Peter Kooij (Bas) and Mieneke van der Velden, viola da Gamba and conducting. CD RAM 0604.
