= Kanal III3b =

River in Germany

Kanal III C

Specifications
- Length: 10.0 km (6.2 miles)

Geography
- End point: Niers (51.3181°N 6.3742°E)

Kanal III3b is a drainage canal of North Rhine-Westphalia, Germany. It discharges into the Niers near Grefrath.
