= Geldern =

- Town
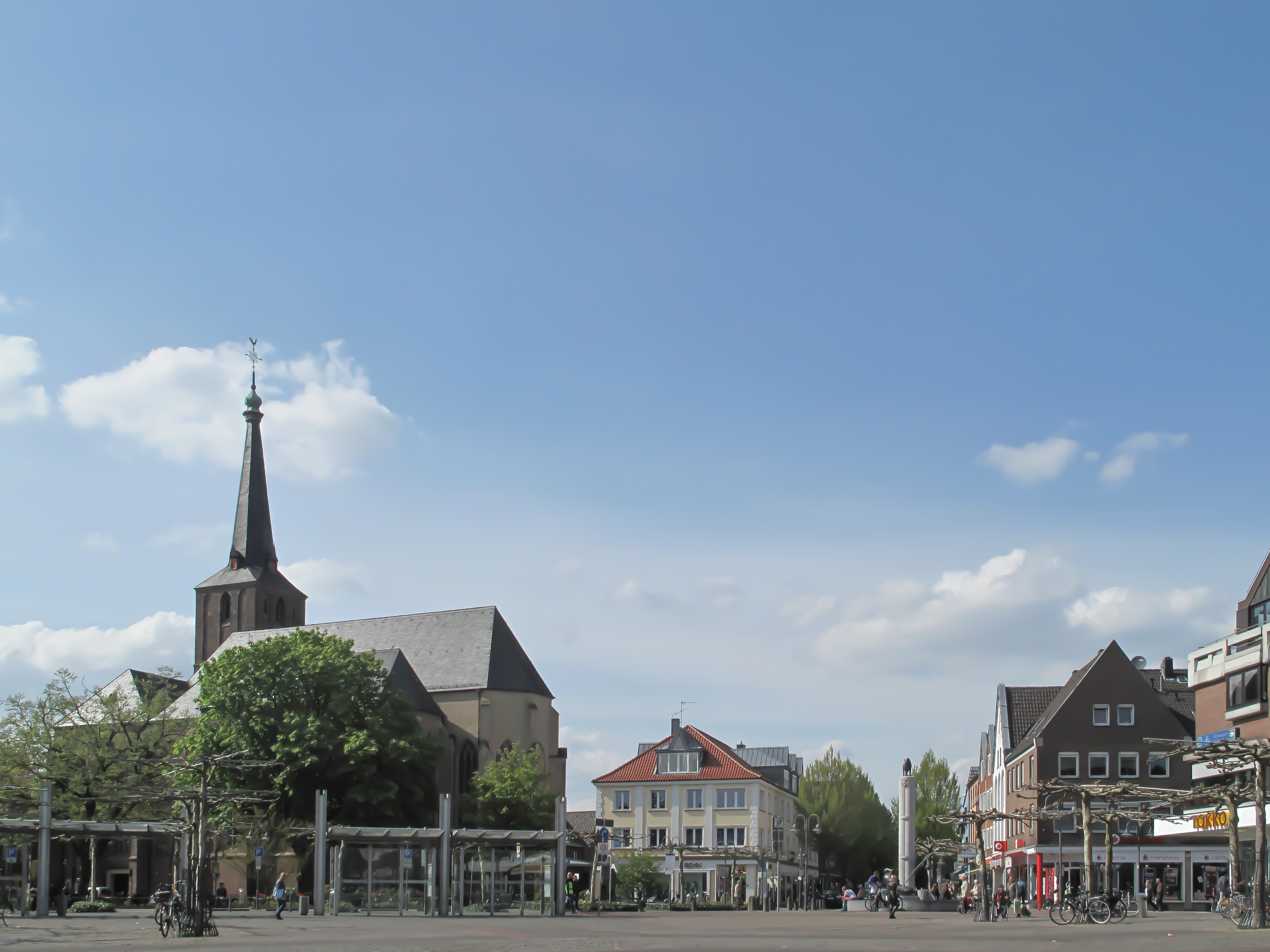

- Flag Coat of arms

- Location of Geldern within Kleve district
- Interactive map of Geldern
- Location within Germany Location within North Rhine-Westphalia
- Coordinates: 51°31′11″N 06°19′57″E
- Country: Germany
- State: North Rhine-Westphalia
- Admin. region: Düsseldorf
- District: Kleve
- Subdivisions: 8

Government
  - Mayor (2020–25): Sven Kaiser (CDU)

Area
  - Total: 96.97 km^{2} (37.44 sq mi)
- Elevation: 24 m (79 ft)

Population (2025-12-31)
  - Total: 34,953
  - Density: 360.5/km^{2} (933.6/sq mi)
- Time zone: UTC+01:00 (CET)
  - Summer (DST): UTC+02:00 (CEST)
- Postal codes: 47591–47608
- Dialling codes: 0 28 31, 0 28 32 (Lüllingen) 0 28 38 (Kapellen)
- Vehicle registration: KLE (until 1975: GEL)
- Website: www.geldern.de

Geldern (German pronunciation: [ˈɡɛldɐn]; Dutch: Gelre, Gelder, Gelderen; archaic English: Guelder(s)) is a city in the federal German state of North Rhine-Westphalia. It is part of the district of Kleve, which is part of the Düsseldorf administrative region. The nearby Dutch province of Gelderland is named after this city.

== Geography ==
=== Location ===
Geldern lies in the plains of the lower, northern Rhineland, west of the Rhine. Its average elevation is 27 m AMSL. The river Niers, a tributary of the Meuse (Maas), flows through Geldern. The stream Gelderner Fleuth flows into the Niers in Geldern.

It is close to both Düsseldorf Airport and Airport Weeze, also called Airport Niederrhein (referring to the Lower Rhine region).

=== Subdivisions ===
Geldern is subdivided into the following boroughs:

- Geldern City
- Hartefeld
- Kapellen (formerly Capellen)
- Lüllingen
- Pont
- Veert
- Vernum
- Walbeck

=== Neighbouring towns and municipalities ===
Geldern shares borders with Kevelaer and Sonsbeck to the north, Issum to the east, Kerken and Straelen to the south, and the Dutch municipalities Venlo and Bergen to the west.

=== Climate ===
Climate data for Walbeck, Gerldern (1991-2020)
Month	Jan	Feb	Mar	Apr	May	Jun	Jul	Aug	Sep	Oct	Nov	Dec	Year
Daily mean °C (°F)	3.3 (37.9)	3.8 (38.8)	6.7 (44.1)	10.4 (50.7)	14.3 (57.7)	17.1 (62.8)	19.0 (66.2)	18.4 (65.1)	15.0 (59.0)	11.0 (51.8)	6.9 (44.4)	4.0 (39.2)	10.8 (51.5)
Average precipitation mm (inches)	63.6 (2.50)	57.8 (2.28)	53.2 (2.09)	41.7 (1.64)	55.9 (2.20)	64.8 (2.55)	74.2 (2.92)	76.2 (3.00)	62.2 (2.45)	65.3 (2.57)	67.7 (2.67)	73.1 (2.88)	755.7 (29.75)
Mean monthly sunshine hours	57	76	127	180	212	212	218	201	154	111	62	46	1,656
Source: Deutscher Wetterdienst

== Coat of arms ==
The first coat of arms of the city of Geldern was a shield with three medlars, referring to an event in the dragon legend. The lion of Guelders, recognizable in the present coat of arms, has been used since the Middle Ages.

== History ==
Historical affiliations

Francia 812–843
Middle Francia 843–855
Kingdom of Lotharingia 855–959
Duchy of Lower Lorraine 959–ca. 1096
County of Guelders ca. 1096–1339
Duchy of Guelders 1339–1393
Duchy of Jülich 1393–1423
Duchy of Guelders 1423–1543
Habsburg Netherlands 1543–1556
Spanish Netherlands 1556–1578
Dutch Republic 1578–1587
Spanish Netherlands 1587–1713
Kingdom of Prussia 1713–1794
French Republic 1794–1804
French Empire 1804–1814
Kingdom of Prussia 1815–1871
German Empire 1871–1918
Weimar Republic 1919–1933
Nazi Germany 1933–1945
Allied-occupied Germany 1945–1949
West Germany 1949–1990
Germany 1990–present

=== Dragon legend ===
According to folk legend, local noblemen Wichard and Lupold of Pont fought a fire-breathing dragon around 878. They found it under a medlar tree, and one of them stabbed it with his spear. The dying dragon rattled two or three times: Gelre! Gelre! In commemoration of this heroic feat, the Lords of Pont founded the city of Geldern at the confluence of the Niers and the Fleuth.

=== Middle Ages ===
The city of Geldern was first documented around 900. Several versions of the name have been used: Gelre, Gielra, Gellero, Gelera and similar. The probable ancestor of the Counts of Guelders was Gerhard Flamens, who received Wassenberg as a fief from Emperor Henry II in 1020. His great-grandson Gerhard IV of Wassenberg was the first to call himself Count of Guelders (as Gerhard I), from 1096. The title "count" came from other properties, probably in Teisterbant. From 1125 only the title of Guelders was used. Wassenberg itself was given to the Duke of Limburg (and later to Jülich) as a wedding gift in 1107. The counts of Guelders moved their residence to the castle in Geldern, that was built probably around this date at the crossing of the Niers. The castle and the accompanying medieval settlement were the origin of the present city, and also gave its name to the county and later duchy of Guelders.

The settlement was fortified in the 13th century with earth and stone walls and moats. The walls were named after the four cardinal directions and had three gates. Geldern received city rights in 1229. It was the residence of the counts and dukes of Guelders until 1343, and capital of the Upper Quarter of Guelders until 1347. The monastery of the Carmelites was built in the early 14th century. The Late Gothic parish church of Mary Magdalene was built between 1400 and 1418.

=== Spanish and Dutch rule ===
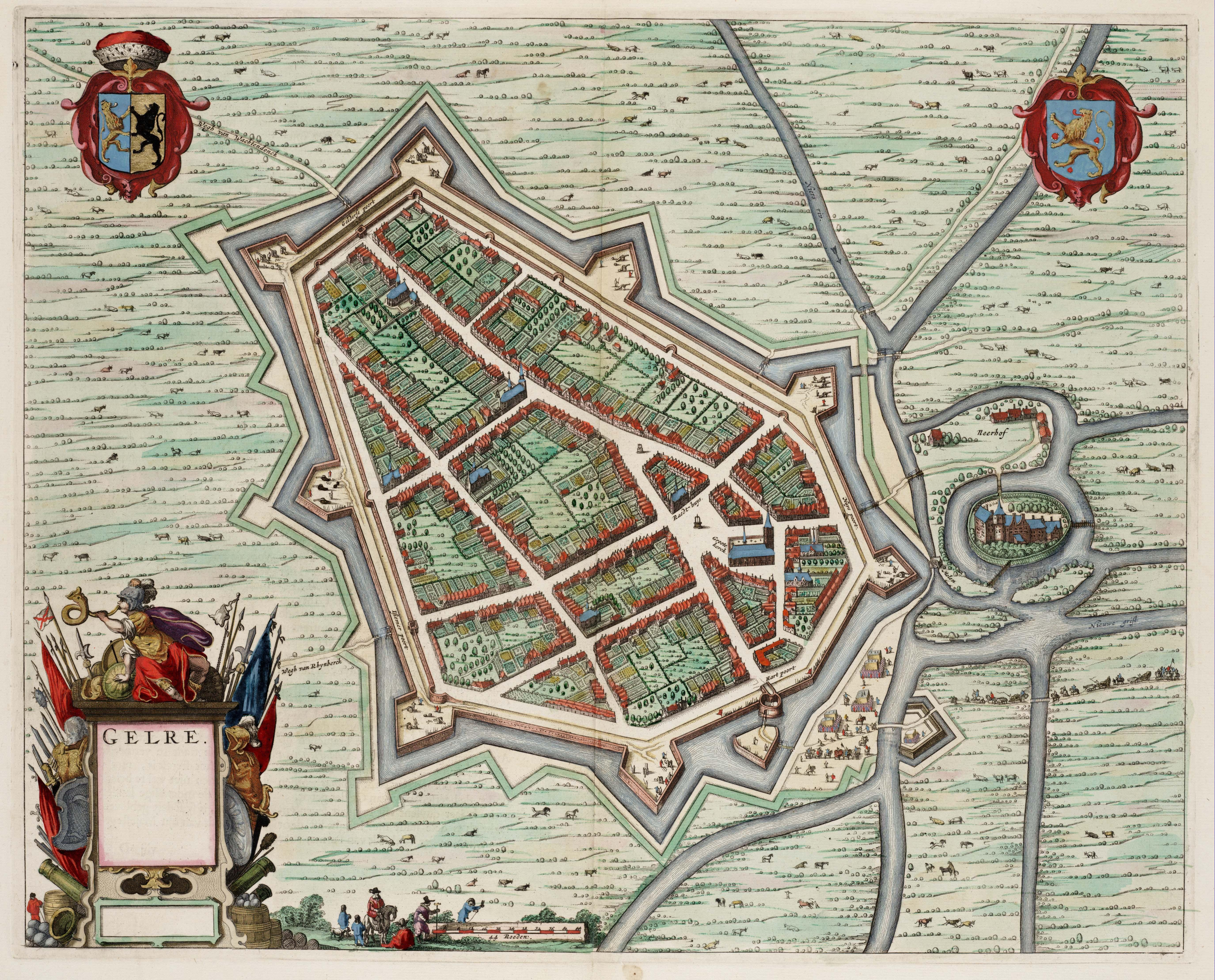
Spanish-ruled Guelder in 1649

Often in its history, Geldern lay in the battlefield of territorial disputes. It was subordinate to Spanish rule from 1543 until 1578, when it was occupied by the Dutch. Geldern returned to Spanish control in 1587, which lasted until 1703. During this period (more exactly between 1662 and 1664) Schloss Haag (first documented in 1337, located 1 km north of Geldern) was expanded. (Since World War II only the outer castle has remained.)

=== 18th century ===
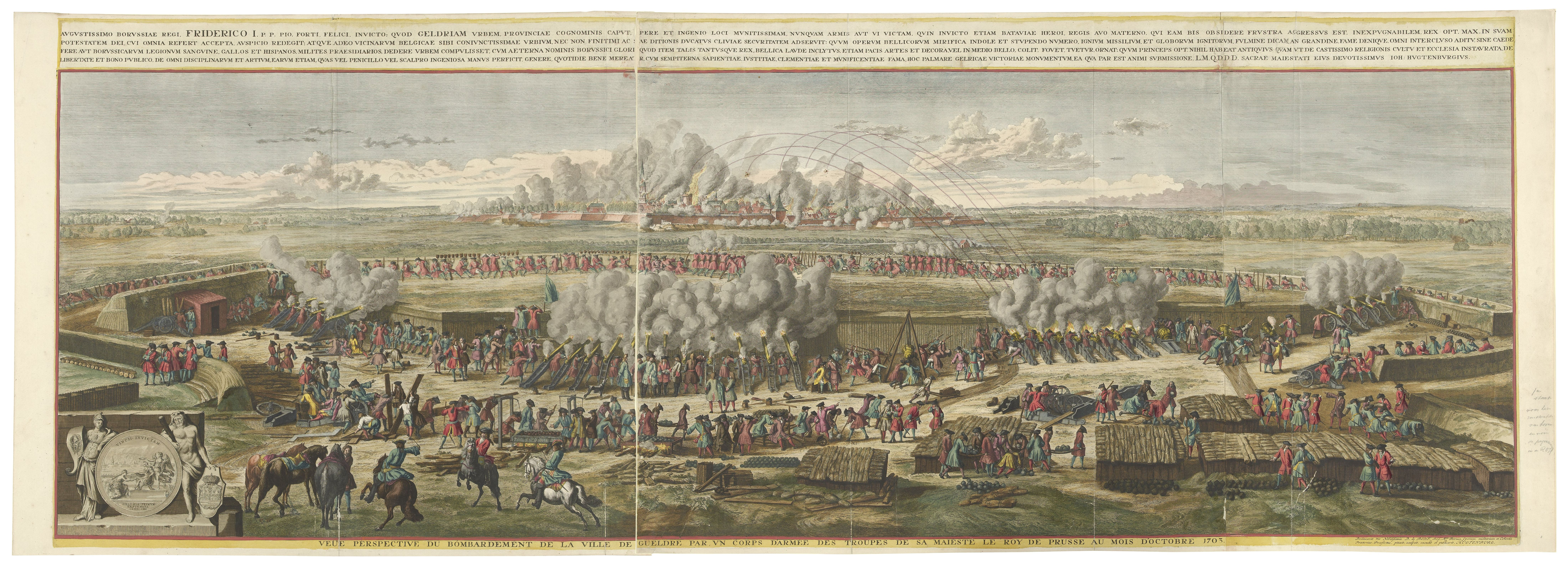
Siege of Guelder in 1703

Map of Geldern (around 1760)

From 1701 until 1714 the War of the Spanish Succession took place. The city was under Prussian siege beginning February 1703, but only surrendered on 21 December. At the end of the war, at the 1713 Treaty of Utrecht, the previously Spanish Upper Quarter of Guelders was divided between four powers: Austria, the United Provinces, Prussia and the Duchy of Jülich. With the larger part of the former Upper Quarter, Geldern fell to Prussia and became the seat of administration of Prussian Guelders. King Frederick II of Prussia visited Geldern in August 1740. He ordered the demolition of the city fortifications in 1764.

=== Modern era ===
Between 1794 and 1814 Geldern was occupied by the French. They disbanded the old structures and created a new, more strict administration. The canton of Geldern was part of the arrondissement of Cleves, which was a part of the département of the Roer. In 1802 the monastery of the Carmelites was secularized.

In the course of the Prussian reorganization of administration, the district of Geldern was formed on 23 April 1816. It was one of over 40 rural districts of the Province of Jülich-Cleves-Berg, the northern half of the later Rhine Province. In 1863 the railway line Cologne – Krefeld – Geldern – Cleves was opened, and a narrow-gauge local line in 1902 (closed in 1932).

In World War II Geldern was bombed several times, at the end of 1944 and on 14 February 1945, which led to devastation in the city centre. Only a few houses were saved, about 82% was destroyed. The parish church was also severely damaged, and the main building of Schloss Haag was completely destroyed. The parish church of Mary Magdalene was rebuilt in 1952, and redecorated in 2003/2004.

== Religion ==
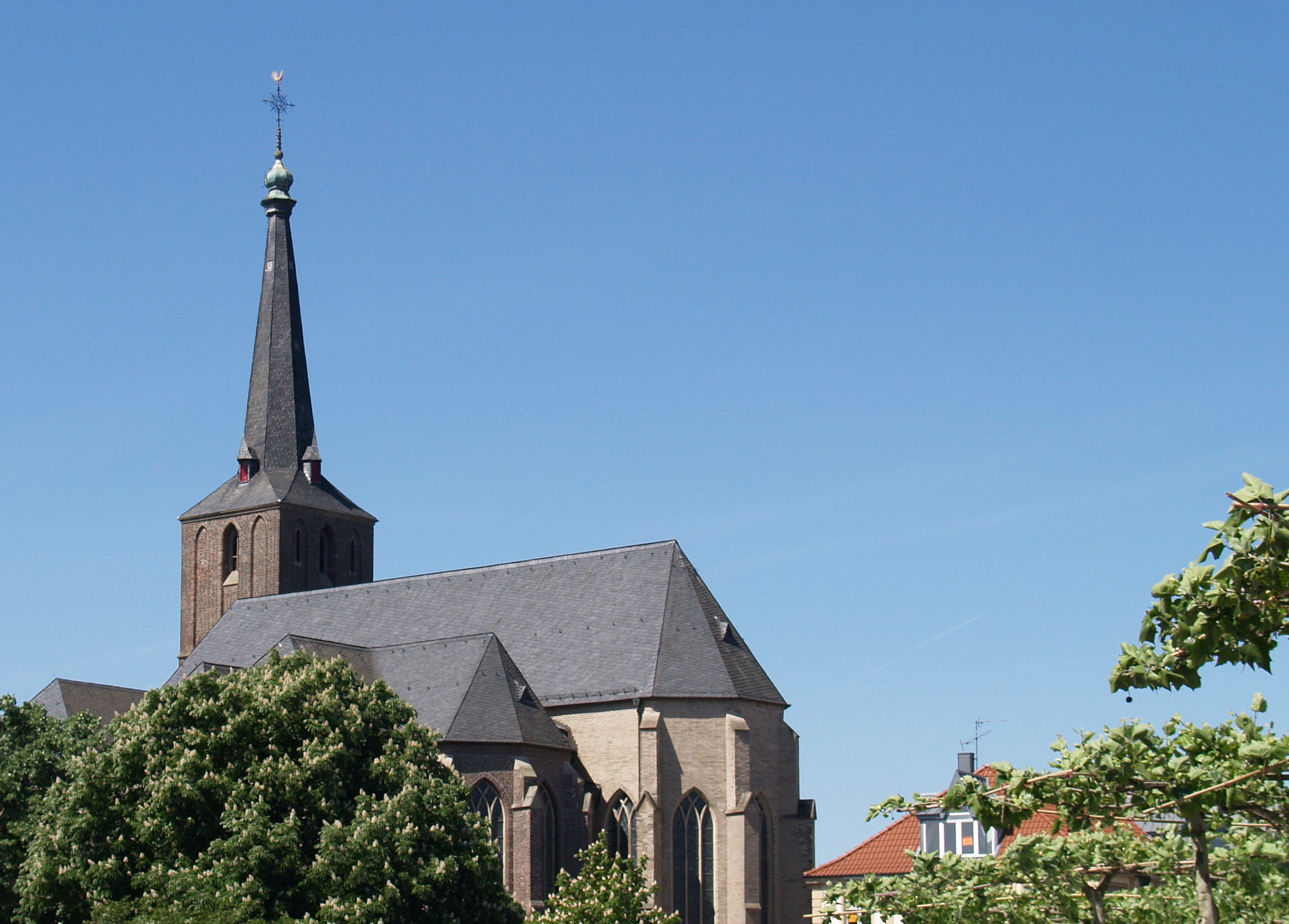
St. Mary Magdalene church

The population of Geldern is mostly Roman Catholic. There are several Catholic churches, including the historically important parish church of Mary Magdalene on the market square. There are two Protestant churches: the Holy Spirit church near the market, and one in the borough of Walbeck.

== Territorial reorganization ==
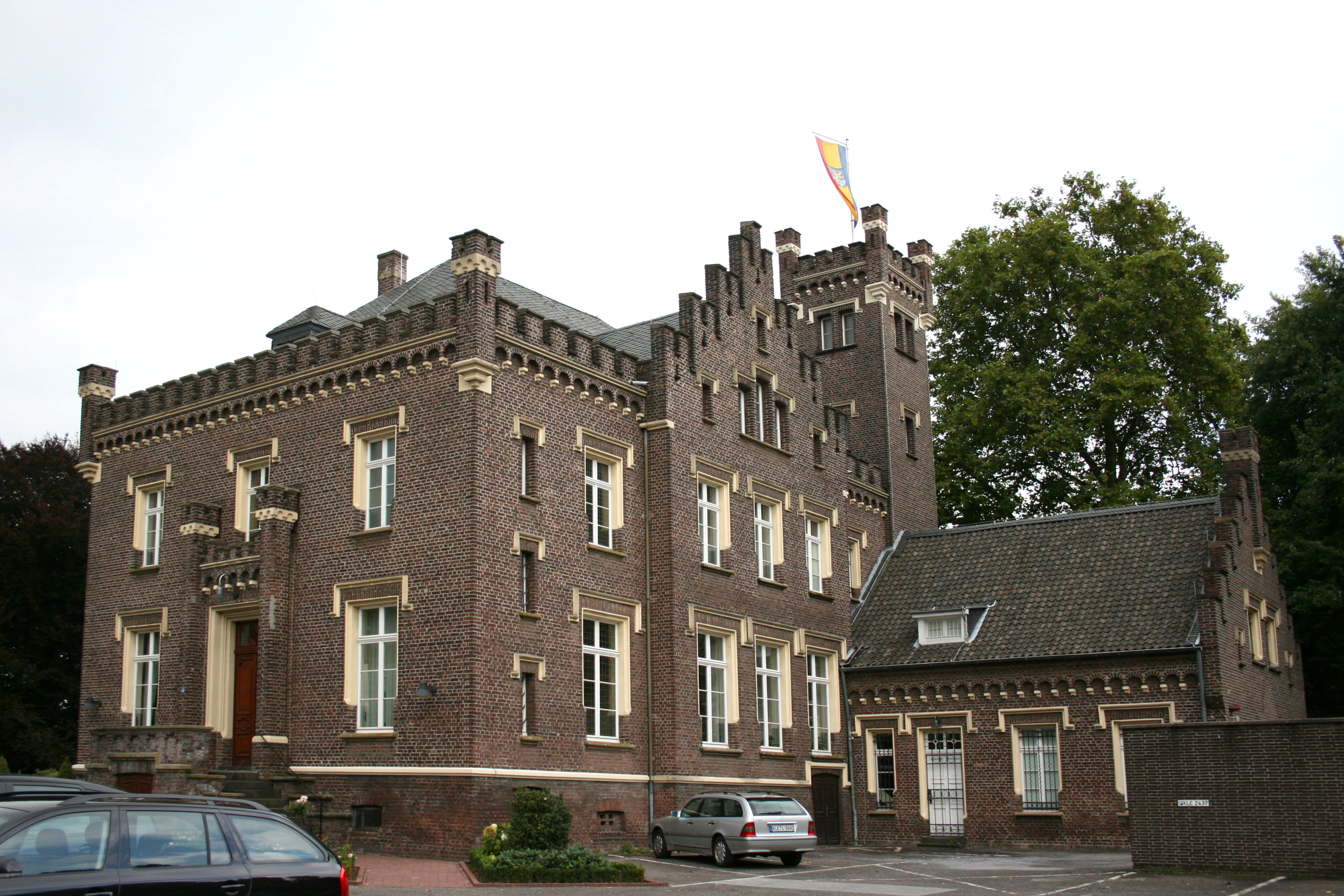
Town hall

The present composition of the city of Geldern was created at the territorial reorganization of North Rhine-Westphalia, on 1 July 1969. The municipalities of Kapellen, Vernum, Pont, Veert and Walbeck were incorporated into Geldern.

On 1 January 1975 the former districts of Cleves and Geldern and parts of the districts of Moers and Rees were merged to form the new district of Cleves.

== Population ==
Historical population

Year	Pop.	±% p.a.
1885	5,690	—
1905	6,551	+0.71%
1937	7,228	+0.31%
1946	5,288	−3.41%
1965	21,585	+7.68%
1970	22,517	+0.85%
1975	24,084	+1.35%
1980	26,234	+1.72%
1985	27,095	+0.65%

Year	Pop.	±% p.a.
1990	29,245	+1.54%
1995	31,709	+1.63%
2000	33,074	+0.85%
2005	34,035	+0.57%
2010	33,575	−0.27%
2015	33,841	+0.16%
2020	33,760	−0.05%
2025	34,953	+0.70%

Source: Landesdatabank Nordrhein-Westfalen (1965-2025)

== Culture and tourism ==
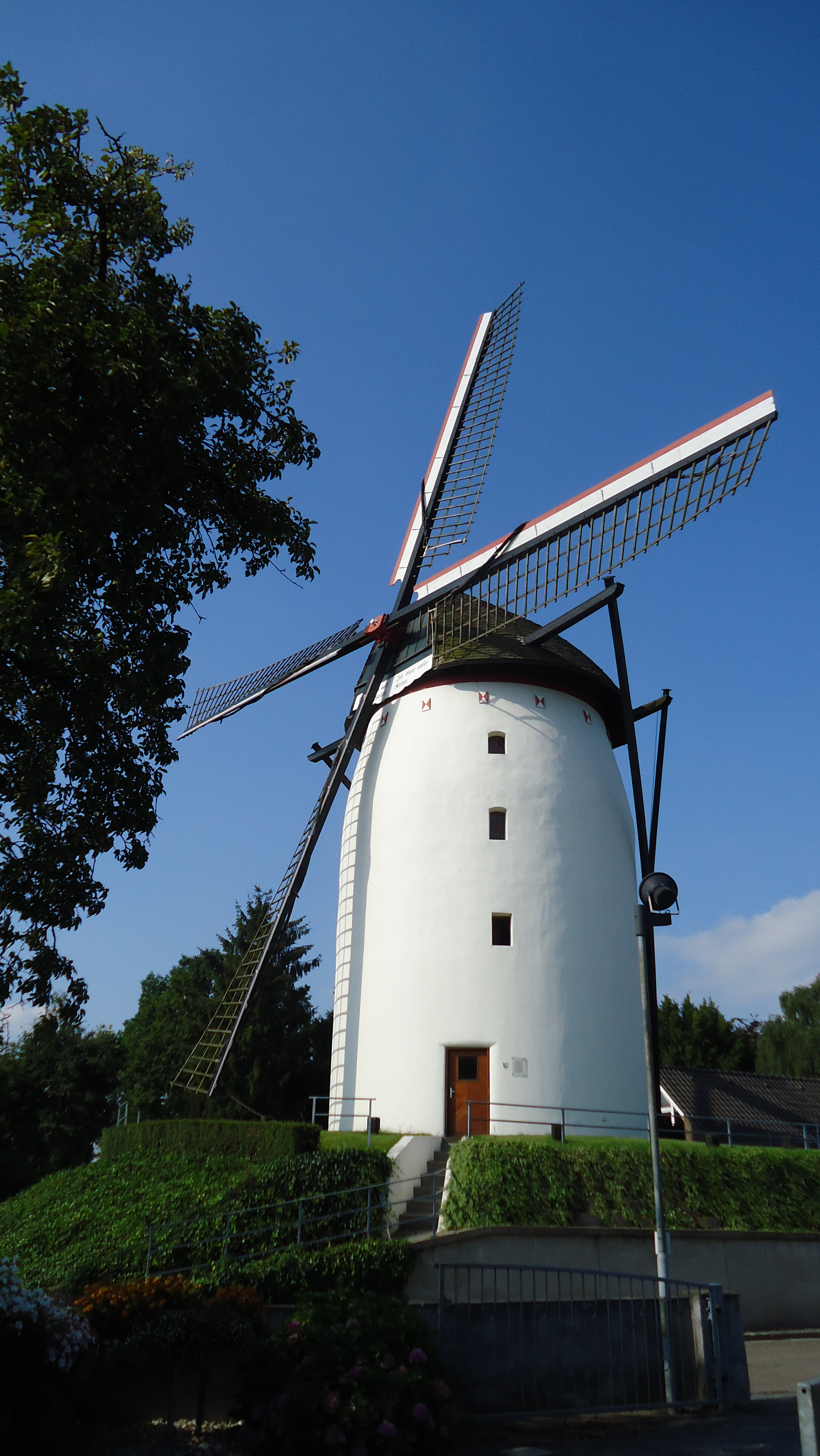
Steprath Mill

=== Buildings ===
There is an approx. 60 km long cycle path along the Fossa Eugeniana, a never completed canal from the Rhine near Rheinberg to the Meuse near Venlo. Hiking is possible around the former Schloss Haag, part of which still remains, and is home to Golfclub Schloss Haag e.V. There is a mill tower and the refectory of the 16th century former monastery of Augustinian nuns. There are some wind mills in the vicinity, including one within 1 km of Geldern-Kapellen.

=== Events ===
Every summer Geldern hosts a street painting contest, which attracts international artists. Geldern has the largest Whitsun(Pentecost) funfair of the lower Rhine, a street party in summer, and a Christmas Market. Several other events are organized in summer.

== Transport ==
=== Aviation ===
Geldern is served by two nearby airports Weeze Airport (19 km) and Düsseldorf Airport (55 km). The international airport in Amsterdam is 180 km or about 2 hours by car.

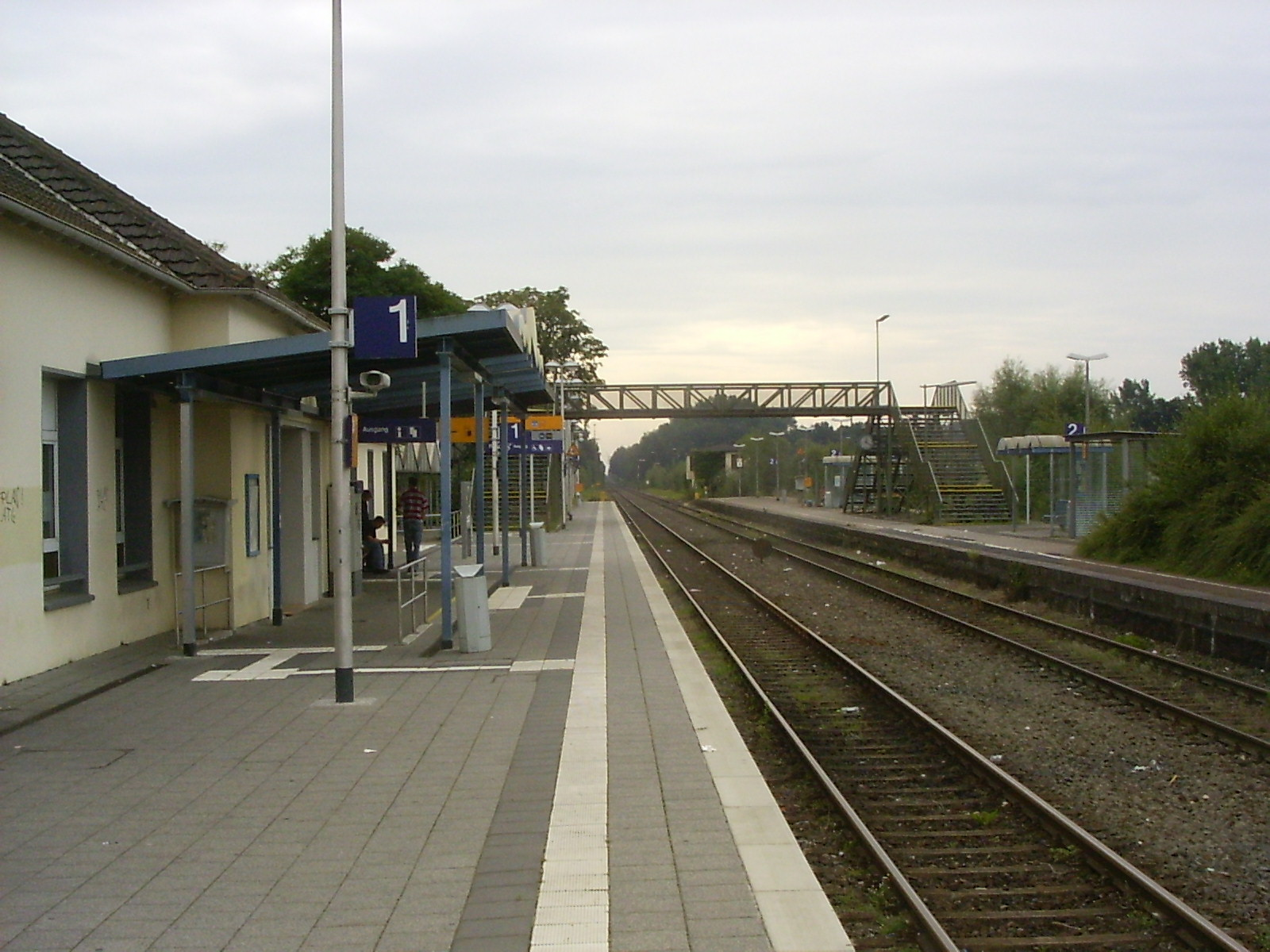
Geldern train station

=== Trains and buses ===
The Deutsche Bahn railway station of Geldern lies on the line from Cleves to Düsseldorf via Krefeld. There are two trains per hour. Buses are used for public transport in the city and the surrounding area.

=== Roads ===
Geldern is connected to the German Autobahns: motorways A40 (E 34) and A57 (E 31) by the federal roads B9 and B58.

== Twin towns – sister cities ==
Geldern is twinned with:

- Bree, Belgium
- Fürstenberg, Germany

== Notable people ==
- Benedictus Buns (1642–1716), priest and composer
- Max Pfeffer (1883–1955), officer, General of the artillery in the World War II
- Joseph Veltjens (1894–1943), Jagdflieger in the World War I and bearer of the Order Pour le Mérite
- Thomas Struth (born 1954), photographer
- Lydia Hüskens (born 1964), politician (FDP)
- Suzie Kerstgens (born 1971), singer
- Xenia Seeberg (born 1972), actress
- Björn Böhning (born 1978), politician (SPD)
- Johannes Oerding (born 1981), singer and songwriter
- Anne van Bonn (born 1985), footballer
