= Niers =

River in Germany and the Netherlands

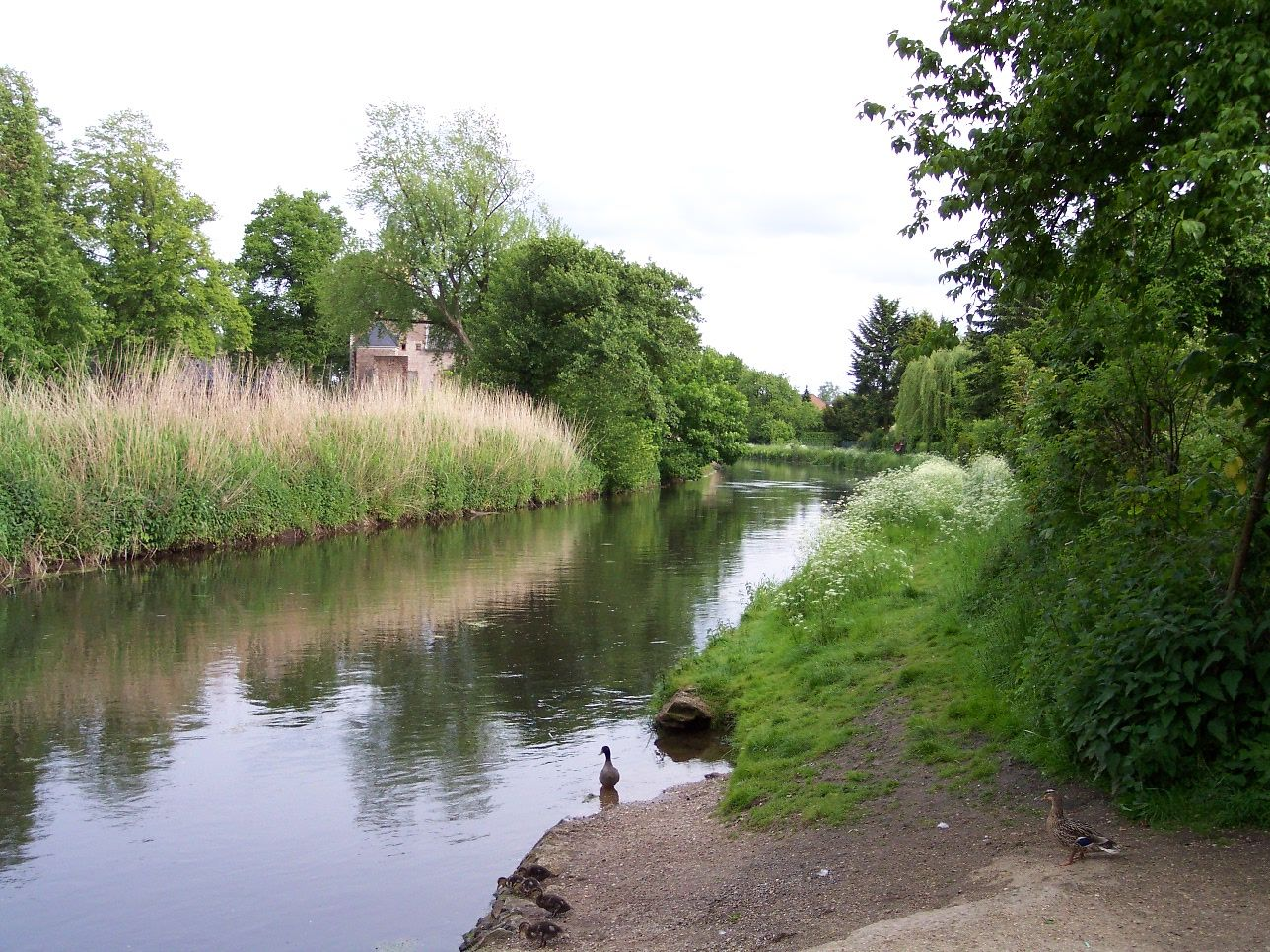
- The Niers at Weeze

Location
- Countries: Germany; Netherlands

Physical characteristics
- Source
  - location: Lower Rhine region
  - coordinates: 51°04′49″N 6°23′31″E
  - elevation: ±75 m (246 ft)
- Mouth
  - location: Meuse
  - coordinates: 51°42′50″N 5°56′51″E
- Length: 113.1 km (70.3 mi)
- Basin size: 1,373 km^{2} (530 sq mi)

Basin features
- Progression: Meuse→ North Sea

The Niers (German: [niːɐ̯s], Dutch: [niːrs]) is a river in Germany and the Netherlands, a right tributary of the river Meuse (German and Dutch: Maas). Its wellspring is near Erkelenz, south of Mönchengladbach, in North Rhine-Westphalia (Germany).

== Course and length ==
The Niers flows through Mönchengladbach, Viersen, Wachtendonk, Geldern and Goch before flowing into the Meuse just across the border with the Netherlands, in Gennep, Limburg (Netherlands).

Its overall length is 116 km - 108 km in Germany, 8 km in the Netherlands.

== See also ==
- List of rivers of North Rhine-Westphalia
- Meuse#Tributaries
