= History of the Centre Party =

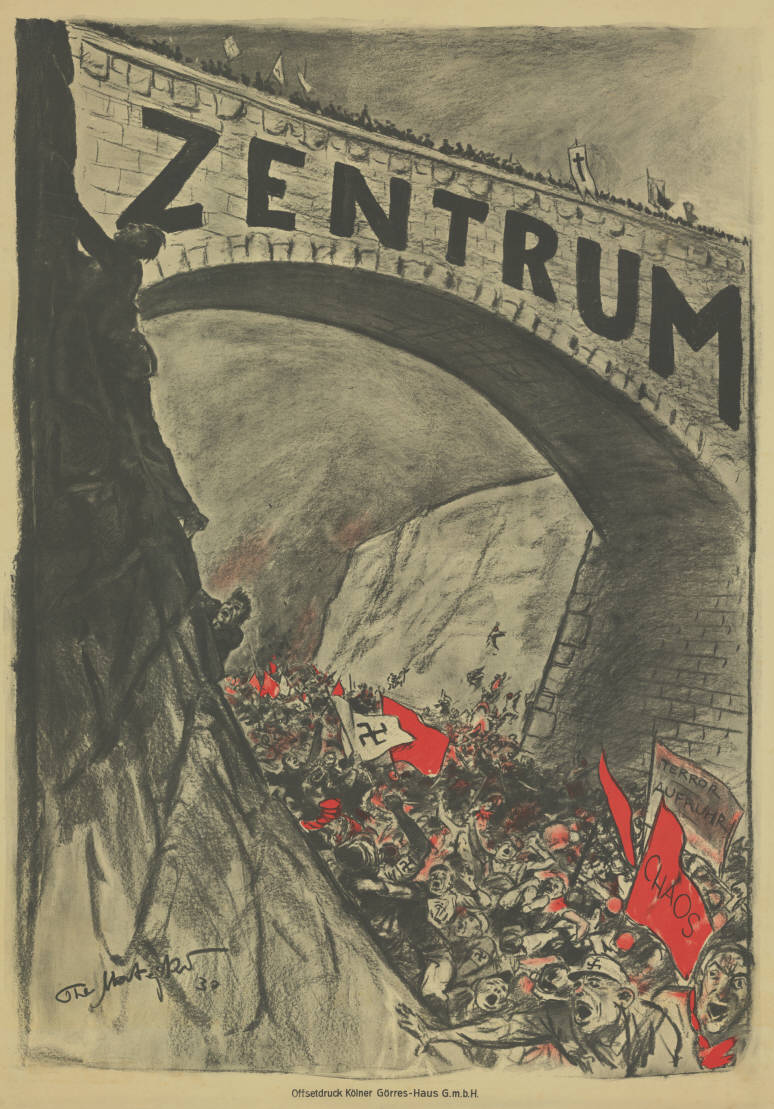
Poster for the 1930 Reichstag election: "The Centre stands above the mob of the radical Left and radical Right."

The history of the German Centre Party (German: Deutsche Zentrumspartei) begins in 1870, when Catholic members of the Prussian House of Representatives formed a faction. The Centre Party developed into a people's party for Catholics throughout Germany. It had significant influence on politics in both the German Empire and the Weimar Republic. It also provided the Reich Chancellor on four occasions. In 1933, at the beginning of the Nazi era, the party dissolved after voting for the Enabling Act of 1933, which gave Adolf Hitler the necessary two-thirds majority and thus contributed significantly to his rise.

The party was re-founded in 1945. However, the Christian Democratic Union of Germany (CDU) formed alongside it as a broad collection of liberal, Christian-democratic, and conservative to nationalist politicians. Many former Centre members, such as Konrad Adenauer, joined the CDU. The new Centre could no longer match the election results of the Weimar Republic. Nevertheless, it was represented in the Bundestag from 1949 to 1957, though not in the federal government.

The Centre participated in several state governments. It last provided deputies in the Landtag of Lower Saxony until 1959. The party's strongholds were in that federal state and in North Rhine-Westphalia. In Bavaria, the Bavarian People's Party had already separated from the Centre in 1920. After 1945, the Centre worked with the Bavaria Party, which existed alongside the much larger Christian Social Union in Bavaria.

The modern Centre Party became a minor party during the 1950s. It participated unsuccessfully in several federal elections. Mergers with like-minded parties failed, while Christian fundamentalist groups such as the Christliche Mitte split off from it. Through the defection of the former AfD federal chairman Jörg Meuthen in June 2022, the Centre Party was briefly represented with one seat in the European Parliament.

== Age and name ==
Catholic parties or factions existed in the parliaments of individual German states before 1870. For a long time, a political party was not understood as a membership organization with an elaborate program, but rather as an association of deputies and like-minded individuals. Modern parties only developed from the 1860s onwards, when universal suffrage (for men) and state conditions required a stable, permanent organization.

The name "Centre" comes from the fact that Catholics sat in parliament between the Liberals on the left and the Conservatives on the right. There were already Catholic factions with this name before 1870. Today, however, a "centrist" party is generally thought of as the political centre, without necessarily implying a denominational orientation.

The modern minor party calls itself the "oldest party in Germany" that still exists. The current party is a re-founding from 1945. The party of 1870 was initially not a party in today's sense and had also dissolved in 1933. Unlike the Social Democratic Party of Germany (SPD), for example, there was no executive committee in exile during the Nazi era. In contrast to other parties, however, the modern Centre uses the old name from 1870. The SPD can trace its organizational roots back to the General German Workers' Association of 1863, but has only borne its current name since 1891. The German Progress Party of 1861 is considered the first German party, in whose tradition the FDP stands.

== Prehistory and Empire ==
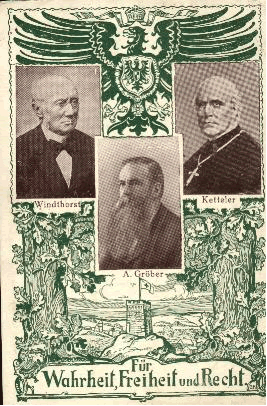
Poster for the founding of the Centre Party

=== Political Catholicism in Germany ===
The politicization of the Catholic denomination took a long time and was not linear. The Reichsdeputationshauptschluss of 1803 marked the end of the ecclesiastical principalities and led, like the French Revolution in general, to a reorientation of German Catholics. They understood their religion as a structural element for society. German Romanticism and its retrospective view of the Middle Ages contributed to this.

The politicization of this development was decisively determined by several factors. One was the replacement of Catholic Enlightenment theology by the Ultramontane movement (strict alignment of the Catholic Church with Rome, up to the dogma of Papal infallibility). This development met with considerable mistrust from both neo-absolutist German princes and religiously critical Liberals. The conflict reached a first peak during the "mixed marriage dispute" of the 1830s. During this, the Archbishop of Cologne, Clemens August Droste zu Vischering, was arrested in 1837. These so-called "Cologne Troubles" triggered a wave of protest and solidarity in Catholic Germany previously unknown.

In the medium term, the opposition of Catholic Germany to the authoritarian state and liberalism found its political expression. Already in the Frankfurt National Assembly of 1848, the Catholic Club was formed in the Paulskirche, representing a loose association of Catholic deputies. It was a kind of cross-factional association focused only on defending the rights of the church against the state. In 1852, a Catholic faction was formed in the Prussian Landtag, which dissolved again in 1867: in the constitutional conflict of that time, conservative and liberal deputies dominated. Catholic factions or faction-like associations were also founded in the parliaments of the other German states. An example is the Catholic People's Party (Baden) of 1869.

The "Soest Conferences", a loose discussion circle around the brothers Georg and Hermann von Mallinckrodt as well as Heinrich von Droste zu Hülshoff, Alfred Hüffer, Baron Wilderich von Ketteler, Friedrich Wilhelm Weber, and Eduard Klein, played an important role in the phase that was to lead to the founding of the Centre Party. The first meeting took place on 12 January 1864 in Soest, and further meetings followed at irregular intervals until the Austro-Prussian War broke out in 1866.

The victory of Protestant Prussia and the pushing out of the Austrian protective power of Catholics in the Reich meant a setback for political Catholicism in Germany. Nevertheless, this was no longer merely a concern of a small, educated upper class. Not least thanks to massive support from local clergy, it began to become increasingly attractive to Catholic voters. For the Catholic Sauerland, for instance, authorities reported an advance of the Catholic movement in the 1860s.

=== 1870 founding ===
Only in 1869, the year before new elections to the Prussian House of Representatives, was the founding of a party prepared again. Assemblies in Ahlen, Münster, and Essen adopted a program drafted primarily by Hermann von Mallinckrodt and Peter Reichensperger. It demanded the independence of church institutions. Denominational schools and church school supervision were to be preserved. The foundation of a German federal state was to take place on a federal basis, granting the member states relatively large independence.

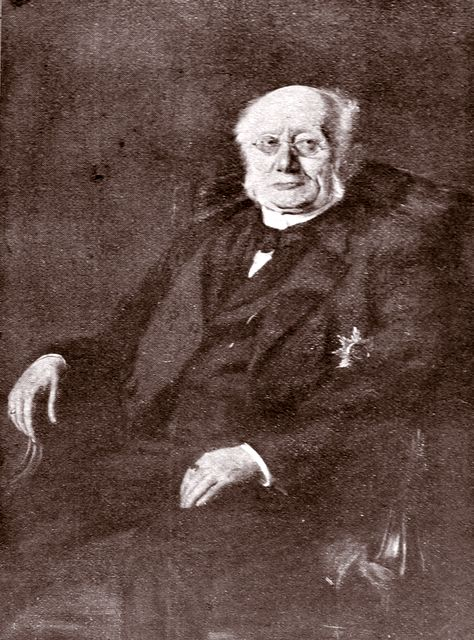
Ludwig Windthorst was already a deputy in the North German Reichstag. He became one of the most famous Catholic politicians in the Empire.

The Essen Program (30 June 1870) already rudimentarily demanded a social policy: the state should work to eliminate social grievances. The tax burden should be distributed more fairly, and the military budget should not be increased.

The Soest Program of 28 October 1870 finally achieved the greatest importance among the early program documents, as the leading forces of the founding were elected to the Prussian House of Representatives on its basis. On 13 December 1870, 48 members of the Prussian House of Representatives founded the "Faction of the Centre", whose first chairman was Karl Friedrich von Savigny. Additionally, Peter Reichensperger and August Reichensperger, Hermann von Mallinckrodt, Ludwig Windthorst, Friedrich Wilhelm Weber, and Philipp Ernst Maria Lieber were influential, as was Eduard Müller from Berlin.

=== Opposition and Kulturkampf (1870–1880) ===
In the 1871 election to the first German Reichstag, the party won 18.6 percent of the vote and 63 mandates. This made it the second-strongest faction after the National Liberal Party. Many liberal deputies lost their seats and suspected illicit support of the Centre by the clergy.

The Centre took on an opposition role in the new Reich from the beginning. It saw itself as representing a denominational minority, after Austria would permanently not belong to the German federal state. Representatives of ethnic minorities in the Reichstag were often Catholic (such as many Poles and Alsatians). Some joined the Centre faction. The social policy of the Centre Party stood in contrast to the economic policy of the Liberals, which Reich Chancellor Bismarck had also joined at the time.

Culturally, a conflict arose with the Liberals and the modern state due to the stance of the Church. The Syllabus of Errors, in which the Pope condemned liberalism among other things, contributed to this. At the First Vatican Council, papal infallibility was proclaimed. The Liberals, but also Bismarck, feared an attack on state sovereignty.

Already at the founding of the Confederation and the Reich, Bismarck had worked not only with parts of the Conservatives but also with the Liberals. Now they endeavored together to push back the influence of the Papacy and the Catholic Church in Germany. The accusation of Ultramontanism (being guided by a power beyond the Alps) was also applied to the Centre Party. While the Conservatives primarily fought foreign influence, the Liberals saw the Papacy as a haven of reaction.

Thus arose the Kulturkampf in the Reich and in Prussia: Civil marriage was introduced, so that citizens were no longer dependent on a religious community and its rules for marriage. It also involved the school system and the question of whether clergy were allowed to give political speeches during worship (the Pulpit Law). Some resistant clergy were imprisoned. The result was not the intended weakening of the Centre, but a closer union of Catholics. The Centre, reviled by Bismarck as Reichsfeinde (enemies of the Reich), profiled itself in the opposition role.

In the 1874 Reichstag election, at the height of the Kulturkampf, the Centre was able to expand its share of the vote to 28 percent. Although this share declined in the following decades, the Centre always won between 90 and 106 mandates in the Reichstag until the end of the Empire. in the coming decades, many Catholics voted for the Centre regardless of whether they belonged to poorer or wealthier classes. From 1881 to 1912, the Centre Party provided the largest Reichstag faction until it was replaced by the SPD.

=== Pillar of Government (1880–1914) ===
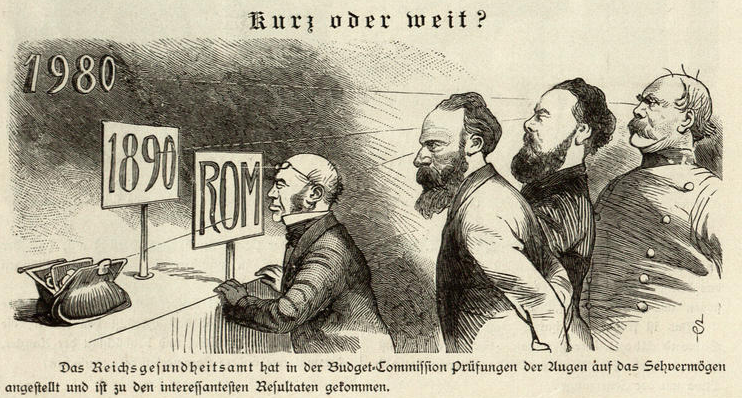
Windthorst's short-sighted fixation on "Rome" in contrast to Bismarck's alleged political foresight, caricature from Kladderadatsch, 1884

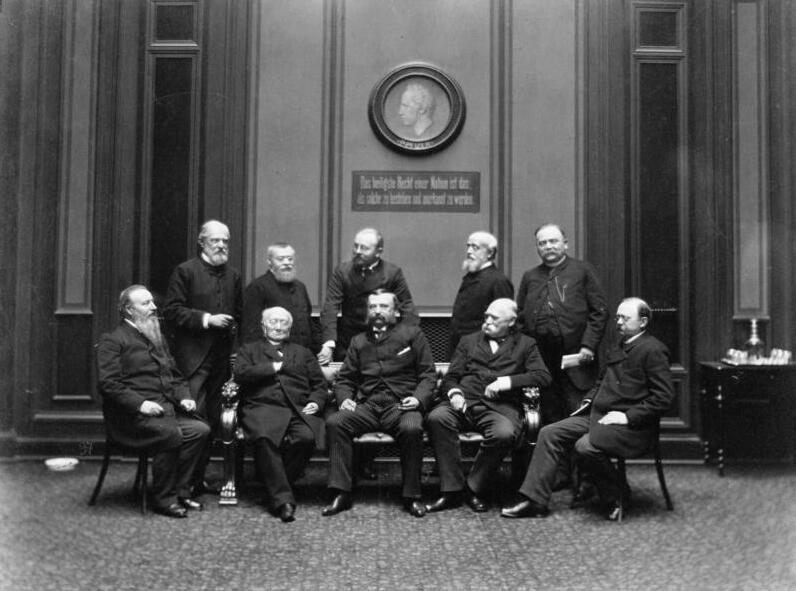
Members of the Reichstag, 1889 (1st row seated l. to r.: Paul Letocha, Ludwig Windthorst, Johann Anton Count of Chamaré, Anton von Dejanicz-Gliszczynski, Albert Horn; 2nd row standing l. to r.: Friedrich Count of Praschma, Philipp Schmieder, Felix Porsch, Clemens Heereman von Zuydwyck, Julius Szmula)

Cooperation between Bismarck and the National Liberals ended around 1878. He now relied more heavily on the Conservatives and sought new allies. Economically, he swiveled from liberalism to protectionism. To ward off the demands of Social Democracy, but also of the Centre, Bismarck began a social policy.

The Centre slowly approached Bismarck's imperial administration, partly because a total of five mitigation and peace laws to settle the Kulturkampf were passed from 1880 to 1887. Meanwhile, Bismarck fought Social Democracy through the Anti-Socialist Laws.

Since the dismissal of Bismarck in 1890 and the death of party chairman Ludwig Windthorst in 1891, the denominationally Catholic aspect of the party receded under party chairman Ernst Lieber in favor of even stronger socio-political engagement. In particular, through the People's Association for Catholic Germany, founded in 1890 and boasting a large membership, an organization emerged that contributed significantly through countless educational lectures and brochures, as well as the socio-political work of the People's Association offices, to giving the Centre Party a definitively socio-political profile and binding many workers to it.

Under Bismarck's successors, the Centre supported government policy in the important fields of domestic, foreign, colonial, and naval policy, thus completing the transformation from an opposition to a de facto governing party, although Catholics continued to be second-class citizens in many respects, denied access to higher positions unless they publicly spoke out against the Centre.

During the Wilhelmine Empire, the Centre remained a stable political force at first glance. It provided the Reichstag Presidium from 1895 to 1906 (Baron Rudolf von Buol-Berenberg, from 1898 Count Franz von Ballestrem). A closer look reveals considerable conflicts within the party. This was partly due to the fact that with the factual end of the Kulturkampf, a central unifying bond had been lost. In particular, since the 1890s, different currents developed. These included a conservative-agrarian wing, alongside a "populist" wing supported primarily by small farmers and craftsmen, a bourgeois wing, and an increasingly strong workers' wing. Other antagonisms were added, but were partly linked to social differences. While there can be no doubt about the "monarchist" basic attitude of the party as a whole, there were considerable democratic tendencies, especially among the workers and in the populist wing. These conflicts were partly fought out publicly in the regions. After the death of Peter Reichensperger, for example, a split in the party occurred in the Centre stronghold of Sauerland for more than 10 years during Reichstag elections due to the nomination of multiple candidates.

After 1900, southern German democrats gained influence over the conservative-aristocratic wing. The party leadership was shared by Peter Spah and Adolf Gröber, Georg von Hertling and Karl Trimborn. In 1905, Georg Friedrich Dasbach was replaced as party chairman. The lack of an outstanding politician facilitated the rise of Matthias Erzberger.

Industrial development also had a negative effect on the party in the long run. Even though the Catholic milieu did everything to bind worker voters (also politically), the Centre began to lose part of its voter potential, especially in large cities and industrial areas. Secularization tendencies played an important role here. In the countryside and in small towns, however, nothing of this was yet to be felt. In the Sauerland, for instance—despite the split—about 90 percent always voted for the Centre. Stagnation at a high level was one of the reasons for considerations to make the party a people's party open also to Protestants. The disputes about this in the so-called Centre dispute remained ultimately inconclusive, so that the party continued to represent only the Catholic section of the population.

The Reichsland Alsace-Lorraine presented a special situation. Even though the population was almost three-quarters Catholic, the local Catholic Reichstag deputies represented autonomist positions and did not join the Centre faction. Only in 1906 was the Alsace-Lorraine Centre Party founded, becoming the strongest party in the Reichsland.

The Centre Party campaigned against discrimination against the Polish minority. Its electoral alliances with Poles earned it and its voters the accusation of being "traitors to the German cause" (Octavio von Zedlitz-Neukirch). The Centre press protested against this defamation: "It means driving political fanaticism and mockery of common sense and natural sense of justice to the extreme, first to bring a nationality almost to despair by unjust treatment and then to insult those who turn against such truly un-German policy as 'traitors' to German-ness."

=== First World War and November Revolution (1914–1919) ===
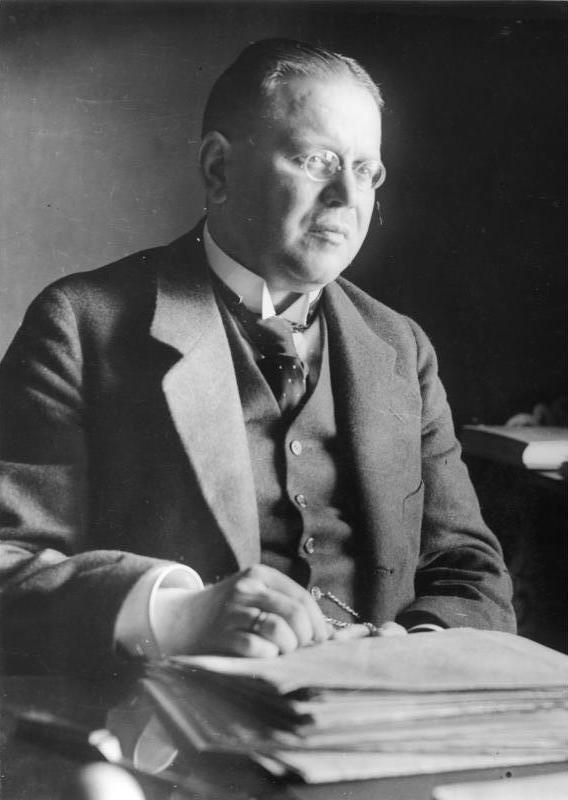
Matthias Erzberger (1919). He rose in the faction during World War I and was a member of the Cabinet of Baden in October 1918. He later became Reich Finance Minister (1919/20). In August 1921, he was murdered by right-wing radicals.

During the First World War, the parties, including the Centre, agreed to the policy of Burgfrieden (civil truce): they supported (continuously) the imperial administration under Chancellor Theobald von Bethmann Hollweg and held back criticism. This went so far that the party factually ceased its activities in some regions.

However, there were different currents and thus attitudes within the Centre Party, which became noticeable during the war. As early as the end of 1914, there were protests from the workforce due to the difficult supply situation. Although the party leadership held back with demands for conquests, it could not prevent this in the entire party. There was also disagreement on the stance towards the Prussian three-class franchise and parliamentarization in the Reich, i.e., whether the Reichstag should determine who sits in the government in the future.

In July 1917, Chancellor Bethmann Hollweg was dismissed and a new Chancellor (Georg Michaelis) was appointed without consultation with the parties. This contributed to the Centre, the SPD, and the left-liberal Progressive Party forming the Inter-party committee (Interfraktioneller Ausschuss), a kind of coalition. The National Liberal Party also partially participated. The committee ensured that the Reichstag adopted a peace resolution advocating a "peace through compromise". The later Weimar Coalition was emerging.

The parties agreed on the conservative Centre politician Georg von Hertling as the new Chancellor. Although he rejected parliamentarization, he was the first Chancellor to come into office directly through a coalition agreement. The Centre was subsequently represented in the cabinet of the non-partisan Max von Baden (October/November 1918). Thus, the party had already contributed to the enforcement of parliamentarism before the October reforms.

The party as a whole rejected the subsequent November Revolution, although in some municipalities party leaders were actually represented in the Workers' and Soldiers' Councils. However, it ultimately worked with the Council of the People's Deputies (an SPD-USPD coalition). In the ranks of state secretaries, it was represented by Matthias Erzberger, who led the armistice delegation. The Centre supported the SPD's policy of convening a constituent National Assembly soon. Overall, opinions in the party diverged on whether a republic was fundamentally desired and what it should look like.

== Weimar Republic (1919–1933) ==
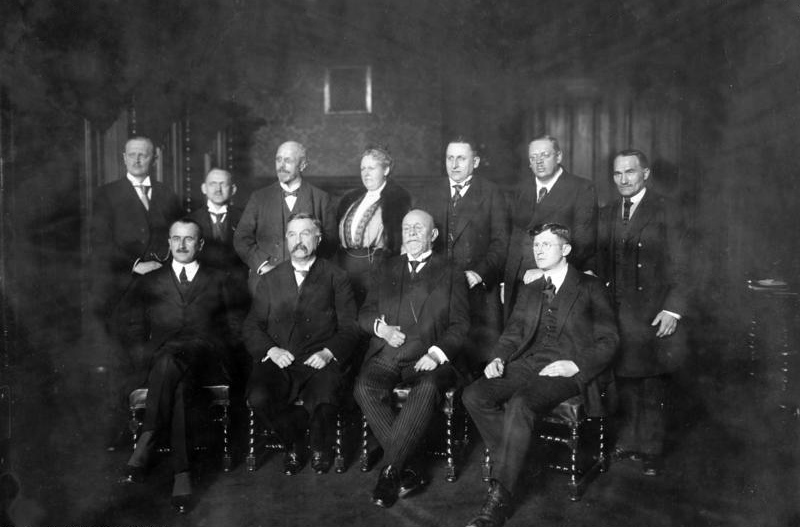
Presidium of the Centre Party 1920, including Aloysius, Prince of Löwenstein-Wertheim-Rosenberg, Constantin Fehrenbach; Helene Drießen; Felix Porsch; Wilhelm Elfes; Sebastian Bauer; Johannes Hauser; Lorenz Blank

In the Weimar Republic, the Centre played an important role, as it held a significant position in the political center of the party system. Although it was fundamentally capable of coalition with almost all political groups from the SPD to the German National People's Party (DNVP), it faced the problem of balancing internal party antagonisms more strongly than before. The party voted for the new (Weimar) constitution in the Weimar National Assembly and participated in almost all Reich governments. Its member Wilhelm Marx became the longest-serving Reich Chancellor of the period. In the largest state, Prussia, the "bulwark of democracy", the Centre also belonged to the government and briefly provided the Minister President.

With the separation of Danzig as the Free City of Danzig in 1920, the Centre Party of the Free City of Danzig was formed there, which was a governing party until the Nazi seizure of power. Within Germany, the Bavarian People's Party (BVP), founded in 1918, also dissolved the parliamentary group community with the Centre in 1920 in protest against the policy of Matthias Erzberger, which was perceived as centralist.

In the 1925 German presidential election, Wilhelm Marx ran for the Centre. Although the SPD candidate had received more votes in the first ballot, it was assumed that Marx would receive more votes overall in the bourgeois camp. But in the second ballot, the Right nominated former World War General Paul von Hindenburg. He won, also with the support of the DVP and BVP, parties that had already formed coalitions with the Centre.

Under party chairmen Matthias Erzberger (murdered by right-wing extremists on 26 August 1921) and Marx, the Centre was a clear pillar of the democratic republic. It helped expand the welfare state and enforced unemployment insurance, among other things. The Centre also participated in the Reichsbanner Schwarz-Rot-Gold: the protection organization founded in 1924 was otherwise supported by the DDP and especially the SPD.

When the Centre Party first entered a coalition with the DNVP in August 1925 (First Luther cabinet), a deep crisis of confidence became apparent in the Centre, and Joseph Wirth left the Reichstag faction in protest against this rightward shift. Around 1928, the party moved even further to the right into the conservative and national camp. The most visible sign of this was the election of the conservative clergyman Ludwig Kaas as party chairman in that year. Kaas was able to prevail against the leading Christian trade unionist Adam Stegerwald. Furthermore, the new faction leader in the Reichstag, Heinrich Brüning (from 1929), was oriented towards Christian-nationalism.

This change was also a reaction to the outcome of the 1928 German federal election. The party had lost considerable vote shares not only in large cities but especially in rural and small-town areas. Some in the party felt that the party had to orient itself more strongly towards the Church again in order to stabilize itself in elections.

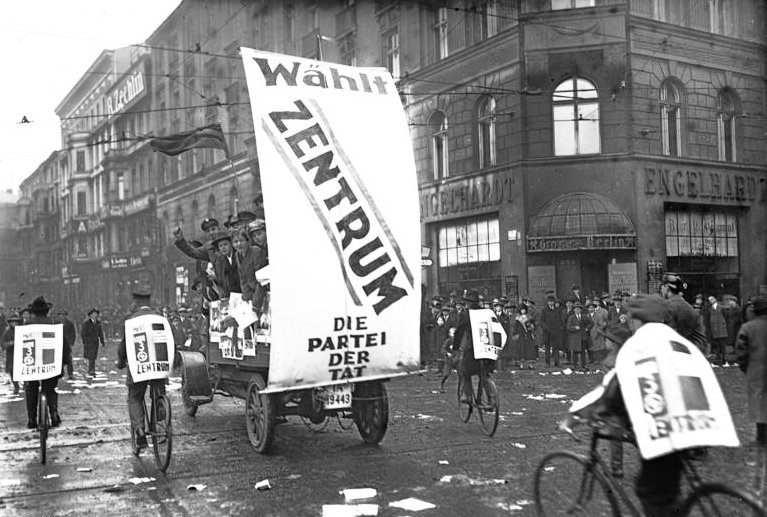
Centre Party election campaign for the 1930 German federal election

Following the Reichstag elections, the Centre Party waged a struggle against the KPD and the strengthening National Socialists. The appointment of Brüning as the first Reich Chancellor of a Presidential cabinet marked the Centre's final turn towards conservative politics. With his deflation and austerity policy, Brüning pursued not only the goal of sanitizing the Reich budget, but also wanted to demonstrate to the victorious powers of World War I that the German Reich was economically no longer able to fulfill the reparation obligations of the Treaty of Versailles, making a deferral or even cancellation of payments inevitable. It is strongly disputed in research how much Brüning's policy contributed to impoverishment in Germany.

At the end of November 1931, concrete coup plans of the Hessian NSDAP (Boxheim Documents) became known. However, Brüning downplayed the incident so as not to block possible coalitions of the Centre with the NSDAP. Paul von Hindenburg, out of well-founded fear of a coup d'état, banned the National Socialist organizations SA and SS on 13 April 1932, on the initiative of Wilhelm Groener and Brüning. However, the ban was lifted again after just two months.

The last Reich Chancellor who was a member of the Centre was Franz von Papen, who, however, stood in opposition to his own party together with the right-wing national wing since his support for Hindenburg in the 1925 presidential elections. By resigning, which he declared two days after his appointment as Reich Chancellor, he preempted expulsion from the party. The Centre Party subsequently fought Papen's "Cabinet of National Concentration", also called the Cabinet of Barons.

The number of Centre Party members is difficult to determine, as there were diverse forms of membership. As a study of the Centre Party in the province of Hanover shows, there were regions with personal individual membership, but also municipalities where the entire household or family were considered party members through the payment of a contribution.

Reich Chancellors The following politicians were Reich Chancellor and members of the Centre, or were before taking office (von Papen).

Image	Name	Term of Office
	Georg von Hertling	1 November 1917 to 30 September 1918
	Constantin Fehrenbach	25 June 1920 to 4 May 1921
	Joseph Wirth	10 May 1921 to 22 October 1921, 26 October 1921 to 14 November 1922
	Wilhelm Marx	30 November 1923 to 26 May 1924, 3 June 1924 to 15 January 1925, 17 May 1926 to 17 December 1926, 19 January 1927 to 12 June 1928
	Heinrich Brüning	30 March 1930 to 7 October 1931, 9 October 1931 to 30 May 1932
	Franz von Papen	1 June 1932 to 17 November 1932 (resigned from the Centre Party on 3 June 1932)

== Nazi Era (1933–1945) ==
Vote shares of the Centre Party in the 1933 Reichstag election

Under the impression of the arrests of KPD Reichstag deputies and threats against SPD and Centre deputies, on 23 March 1933, the Centre faction in the Reichstag voted for Hitler's Enabling Act of 1933 after prior coordination with the NSDAP, thereby formally helping him (after the arrest of the KPD deputies) to the required two-thirds majority.

Hitler had made some oral promises to Kaas to secure his approval. Hitler assured that the rights of the Reich President would be preserved, the Reichstag and Reichsrat would continue to exist, and that school policy and the relationship between state and religion would not be regulated by the Enabling Act. Above all, however, the hope for the conclusion of a Reichskonkordat with the Vatican strongly influenced the opinion of the party leadership.

The party sought a closed transfer into the NSDAP faction in the form of a observer status, which the latter denied. On 5 May 1933, Kaas, who was permanently staying in Rome, handed over the party chairmanship to Heinrich Brüning. Brüning maneuvered cautiously and wanted to preserve the Centre through readiness to cooperate with the NSDAP, but soon had to recognize that the Centre could not be maintained either. Before the conclusion of the Reichskonkordat draft of 20 May 1933 by Ludwig Kaas, which was criticized by Heinrich Brüning, the party lost backing in the Vatican and faced threats from the NSDAP and arrests of leading members. On 28 June 1933, Joseph Goebbels demanded that Brüning "close his shop immediately," otherwise they would no longer watch the "experiments" of this party. On 2 or 3 July 1933, Kaas telephoned Centre politician Joseph Joos from the Vatican and asked impatiently: "Have you not dissolved yet?" At the end of June, Nazi ideologue Alfred Rosenberg classified the party as a "remnant of a [...] overcome past" and declared dissolution necessary "for the welfare of the German nation."

After a majority of faction deputies in the Reichstag and the Prussian Landtag had voted for self-dissolution—Brüning mentions Fritz Grass and Karl Maria Hettlage among them—the party dissolved itself on 5 July 1933 as the last of the so-called bourgeois parties. On 20 July 1933, the Reichskonkordat was finally solemnly signed in the Vatican by Pacelli and von Papen. The successful conclusion of the Lateran Treaties with Mussolini had reinforced the Vatican's view that a concordat was a far better solution for relations with Hitler than relying on Catholic political parties.

During the Nazi dictatorship, countless Centre politicians were discriminated against, imprisoned, and killed in concentration camps. The persecution of Centre politicians extended from high officials to ordinary members.

Already in 1933, Centre people were sent to the Osthofen concentration camp. The Nazi dictatorship saw a danger in the Catholic Church and its political representation; before the seizure of power, members of the NSDAP had been excluded from the sacraments by Catholic bishops. The Catholic Church had explicitly forbidden Catholics to support or vote for the NSDAP.

During 1935, the realization prevailed in the Catholic Church that the attempt undertaken with the Concordat to protect the Catholic Church and German Catholics had failed. Subsequently, more Catholics and former Centre members became activists who resisted the National Socialist system.

Following the 20 July plot of 1944, even more members of the former Centre became targets of National Socialist persecution during the Aktion Gitter. Thus, the former Centre politician Franz von Galen (brother of the Catholic bishop and Nazi opponent Clemens August Graf von Galen) was deported to a concentration camp.

== Post-War Period (1945–1959) ==
=== Re-founding and Time in the Bundestag ===
After the war, the Centre was re-founded. This was partly because some former Centre people did not want to join the new, supra-denominational CDU. On the other hand, the economic and social policy of the CDU was felt to be too business-friendly. The Centre of the young Federal Republic was dominated by former left-wing Centre members from the Weimar Republic. The Centre Party spoke out against the economic reforms of Ludwig Erhard and emphasized the "necessity of a meticulously planned economy by the state." The Bundestag deputies and the party leadership of the Centre spoke out in the second Bundestag against "any kind of remilitarization." In cultural policy, however, it was less liberal than the CDU and strongly denominationally oriented.

However, the Centre had lost its function as a Christian-Catholic people's party, as the CDU was conceptually a joint party of both major denominations. The Centre only had temporary regional strongholds, especially in North Rhine-Westphalia and in Emsland (Lower Saxony). In particular, the Catholic bishops Conrad Gröber and Joseph Frings preferred a Christian party of both denominations and finally ceased to support the Centre Party.

Two deputies of the Centre Party belonged to the Parliamentary Council (1948/49). For the 1949 West German federal election, the CDU and Centre concluded an agreement in which they assured not to describe the other side as "culturally unreliable." In the 1st German Bundestag, ten deputies from North Rhine-Westphalia were represented because the five-percent threshold then only applied at the state level. In the 1953 West German federal election, the CDU refrained from nominating a direct candidate in the constituency of Oberhausen and supported the Centre. Since a direct mandate was sufficient at that time to override the five-percent hurdle, three deputies entered the second Bundestag for the Centre Party, although one was the CDU deputy who had waived the direct mandate. The party thus provided two deputies. Konrad Adenauer offered to include the two in the government coalition; the Centre Party declined.

On behalf of the party executive, Helmut Bertram tried around 1955 to form an alliance of various Christian minor parties. In the 1957 West German federal election, they hoped to offer an alternative to disappointed CDU/CSU voters. However, he only won the Bavaria Party and the German-Hanoverian Party, a split-off from the German Party. They ran under the same name that had already been used for the Bundestag faction, Federalist Union. However, they only ran in North Rhine-Westphalia (Centre), Lower Saxony (Centre/DHP), and Bavaria (BP). Nationwide, the alliance only achieved 0.9 percent.

=== The Party in the States ===
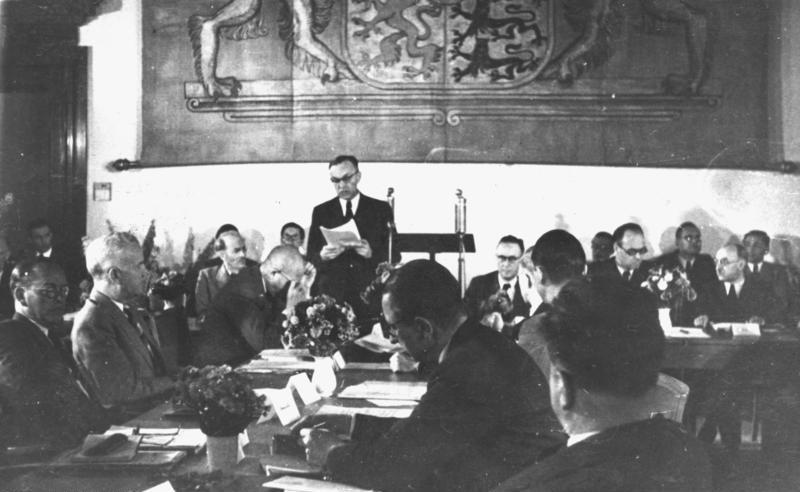
Minister President Amelunxen in June 1947 at a meeting of German Minister Presidents

Rudolf Amelunxen of the Centre was the first Minister President of North Rhine-Westphalia from 1945 to 1947. He had been appointed by the British occupation authorities. In mid-1947, the Christian Democrat Karl Arnold became the new Minister President. The Centre was also involved in his cabinets, even after the phase of national unity governments.

The CDU NRW wanted to keep the Centre as a coalition partner and supported it in the 1954 state election. In constituency 62 (Essen-Borbeck-Karnap), Arnold's party waived its own candidate in favor of the Centre. Thus, the Centre was able to enter the Landtag even without reaching the 5-percent threshold. The Centre received 4.0 percent of the vote and provided nine deputies.

In 1956, a conflict arose in federal politics between Chancellor Adenauer and the FDP. Adenauer threatened to introduce a majority voting system. Therefore, the FDP left the government in NRW. Together with the Centre, they elected the SPD politician Fritz Steinhoff as the new Minister President. Adenauer now no longer had a majority in the Bundesrat for an electoral law reform.

However, in the state election on 6 July 1958, the CDU NRW reached 50.5 percent of the vote (plus 9.2 percentage points); the Centre slumped to 1.1 percent. This ended the government participation and parliamentary representation for the North Rhine-Westphalian Centre.

In Lower Saxony, the Centre Party relied heavily on the rural lower class of Heuerleute (tenant farmers), who had already voted for the party earlier. However, this class disappeared over time. In the 1959 elections, the party received only 0.03 percent of the vote. Thus, there were no more Centre deputies in this Landtag either.

In the Saarland under French rule, "pro-German" parties like the Centre were initially not allowed. This changed after the referendum of October 1955, in which voters decided in favor of joining the Federal Republic. Thus, the Centre merged with the Christian People's Party of the Saarland to briefly form the Christian People's Party (CVP) in 1956. CVP then joined the CDU, and the merger with the Centre was dissolved in April 1957.

Later, a split-off from the CVP formed, the Saarland People's Party. It united with the Centre in 1965 to form a new CVP. In the 1965 West German federal election, this CVP achieved 0.1 percent of the vote, whereupon the Centre left the party again.

== The Centre as a Minor Party (since 1959) ==
For the 1969 West German federal election, the Centre ran alone again and achieved a vote share of 0.05 percent with 15,933 voters. For the first European election in 1979, the party ran nationwide and won 31,367 votes (0.11 percent). In the 1984 European election, it received 93,921 votes or 0.38 percent. In 1987, it ran for a federal election for the first time since 1969 and received 19,035 votes (0.05 percent).

In the 1980s, two splits from the Centre occurred. A group around Josef Ripsam left the party in 1985 as the Christian Party for Life (CPL). It formed the Christian League – The Party for Life (LIGA) with other Centre members who left the party in 1987. This merged into the Christian Party of Germany in 1995, which rejoined the Centre Party in 2002.

The federal chairwoman Adelgunde Mertensacker was not re-elected in 1987 and left the Centre with the Christian fundamentalist wing. As Christliche Mitte, the group participated in several elections (unsuccessfully). In 2016, it renounced its party status.

In the 1980s and 1990s, the Centre concentrated on local politics in its democratic-social post-war tradition. Christian foundations played, if anything, only a subordinate role. In 1989, for the third European election, the election result sank again to 41,190 votes or 0.15 percent. Consequently, the Centre did not run in the next federal election in 1990. For the election of the 13th Bundestag in 1994, 3,757 voters voted for the Centre with their second vote. In the 1998 federal election, the Centre only ran with direct candidates. Also in the European election the following year, the Centre achieved only a very low approval of 0.03 percent with 7,080 votes.

From the end of 2006 to 29 October 2007, there were concrete talks about a merger with the Party of Bible-abiding Christians (PBC) under a new common name. However, these talks were ended by a resolution of the Federal Executive Board of the Centre Party. Also in the PBC, some members rejected a merger with another party. Above all, they wanted to keep the party name and campaign strategy.

For the Hamburg state election in February 2008, the Centre Party ran under the leadership of politicians who had previously belonged to the CDU, the STATT party, or the right-wing populist Schill party. Among them was the former Hamburg Senator of the Interior Dirk Nockemann. The former television presenter Eva Herman was offered a candidacy. 0.1 percent of the votes cast were achieved.

From 2009 to 2011, it was disputed whether Alois Degler or Gerhard Woitzik was chairman of the party. Finally, a federal party conference was scheduled for 19 February 2011, during which the election of a new federal executive board also took place: Gerhard Woitzik was elected as the new federal party chairman, Alois Degler as his 2nd deputy. Ewald Jaksch left the party conference indignantly and organized a parallel meeting where he had himself elected chairman by some loyalists with twelve votes. In February 2012, the Düsseldorf Regional Court declared Jaksch's election invalid.

In 2017, the Centre reached 0.04 percent in the state election in North Rhine-Westphalia. Candidacies for the 2017 German federal election and the 2019 European election failed because the party could not collect enough signatures to support the candidacy.

The Centre did not participate in the 2021 federal election because the party had not been able to present an accountability report for six consecutive years that met legal requirements. In January 2022, the Centre accepted the former AfD deputy Uwe Witt as a member. The Schleswig-Holsteiner had left the AfD because it had not done enough against right-wing extremism and because he wanted to pursue "Christian and humane politics." The Centre Party emphasized that Witt's admission was an individual decision. Future membership applications from former AfD politicians would be examined closely so that the ideological course of the party does not change. The Süddeutsche called the Centre a "relic of the Bismarck era" on this occasion. The "splinter party" with small strongholds in the Paderborn and Münsterland had little to do with the party of earlier times. Witt left the Centre Party again in August 2022.

In June 2022, former AfD federal chairman Jörg Meuthen joined the Centre Party. As a result, until Meuthen's renewed resignation in September 2023, it was represented in the European Parliament for the first time.

== Party Chairmen ==
Weimar Republic (1919–1933)
Photo	Name (Lifespan)	Years	Notes
	Karl Trimborn (1854–1921)	1920/1921	
	Wilhelm Marx (1863–1946)	1922–1928	
	Ludwig Kaas (1881–1952)	1928–1933	
	Heinrich Brüning (1885–1970)	1933	
Post-war period and Federal Republic (since 1945)
	Wilhelm Hamacher (1883–1951)	1945/1946	
	Johannes Brockmann (1888–1975)	1946–1948	
	Carl Spiecker (1888–1953)	1948–1949	
	Fritz Stricker (1897–1949)	1949	
	Helene Wessel (1898–1969)	1949–1952	
	Johannes Brockmann	1953–1969	
	Gerhard Ribbeheger (1918–2007)	1969–1974	
	Gerhard Woitzik (1927–2023)	1974–1986	
	Adelgunde Mertensacker (1940–2013)	1986–1987	
	Gerhard Ribbeheger	1987–1996	
	Gerhard Woitzik	1996–2009	
	Alois Degler (born 1949) or Gerhard Woitzik	2009–2011	Disputed
	Gerhard Woitzik	2011–2021	
	Klaus Brall	2021–2022	
	Christian Otte	since 2022	

== Parliamentary Group Leaders ==
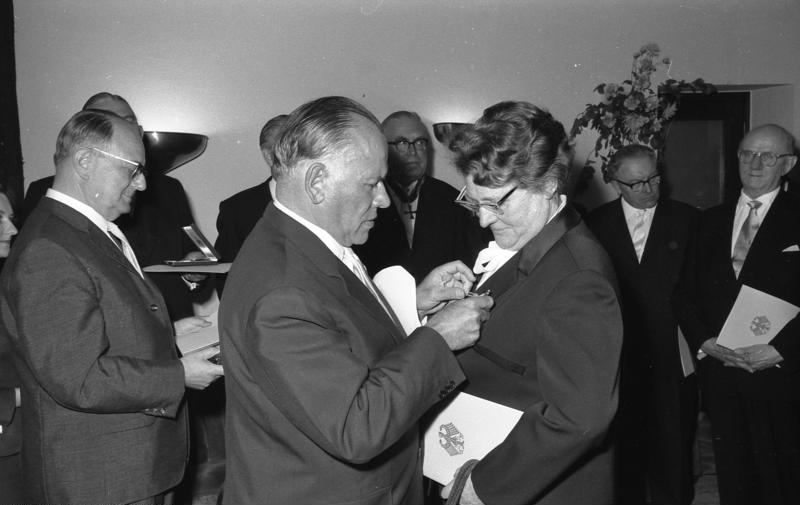
Bundestag President Eugen Gerstenmaier presenting the Order of Merit of the Federal Republic of Germany to Helene Wessel in 1965.

After the March election of 1871, a Centre faction was formed in the Reichstag. Such a faction also existed in all subsequent Reichstags until 1933 as well as in the Weimar National Assembly of 1919/1920.

From 1949 to 1951, the Centre formed an independent Bundestag faction. From 1951 to 1953, a parliamentary group of the Centre with the Bavaria Party existed under the name Federalist Union. On 24 January 1952, Hermann Clausen, the only deputy of the South Schleswig Voters' Association (SSW), also joined the parliamentary group. From 1953 to 1957, the Centre was only represented in the Bundestag with three deputies. Since 1957, the party has not held any Bundestag mandates—except for a short exception in 2022.

Reichstag in the Empire (1871–1918)
Name (Lifespan)	Duration	Notes
Karl Friedrich von Savigny	1871–1875	
Georg Arbogast von Franckenstein	1875–1890	
Franz von Ballestrem	1890–1893	
Alfred von Hompesch	1893–1909	
Georg Baron von Hertling	1909–1912	Later Reich Chancellor (1917/1918)
Peter Spahn	1912–1917	
Adolf Gröber	1917–1919	
National Assembly and Weimar Reichstag (1919/1920–1933)
Karl Trimborn	1919–1921	
Wilhelm Marx	1921–1923	Later Reich Chancellor
Constantin Fehrenbach	1923–1926	
Wilhelm Marx	1926	
Theodor von Guérard	1926–1928	
Adam Stegerwald	1928–1929	
Heinrich Brüning	1929–1930	
Thomas Eßer	1930–1931	Acting deputy chairman
Ludwig Perlitius	1931–1933	
German Bundestag (from 1949)
Helene Wessel	1949–1951	
Hugo Decker	1951–1953	Member of the Bavaria Party
Helene Wessel	1951–1952	Left the party for the GVP
Otto Pannenbecker	1952–1953	

== Election Results ==
=== Election results in the German Empire ===
Vote share and number of seats of the Centre in the Reichstag elections 1871–1912
Year	Vote share	Seats
1871	18.6 %	63
1874	27.9 %	91
1877	24.8 %	93
1878	23.1 %	94
1881	23.2 %	100
1884	22.6 %	99
1887	20.1 %	98
1890	18.6 %	106
1893	19.1 %	96
1898	18.8 %	102
1903	19.8 %	100
1907	19.4 %	105
1912	16.4 %	91

=== Election results in the Weimar Republic ===
Vote share and number of seats of the Centre in the election to the National Assembly 1919 and the Reichstag elections 1920–1933
Year	Vote share	Seats
1919	19.7 %	91
1920	13.6 %	64
May 1924	13.4 %	65
Dec 1924	13.6 %	69
1928	12.1 %	61
1930	11.8 %	68
Jul 1932	12.4 %	75
Nov 1932	11.9 %	70
Mar 1933	11.3 %	73

=== Election results after 1945 ===
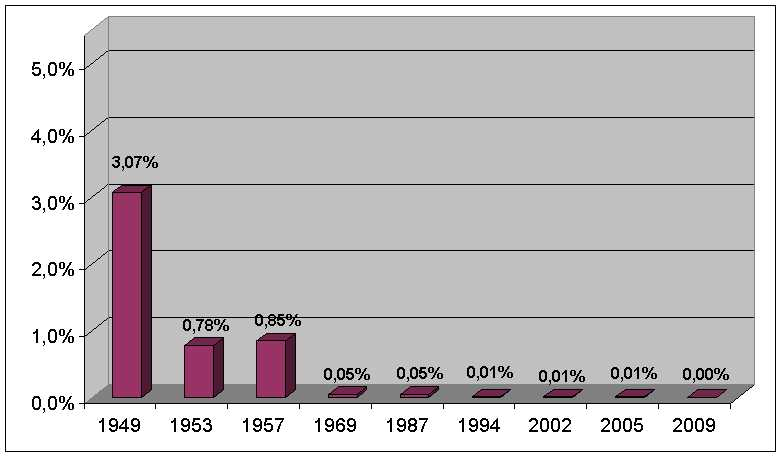
Bundestag election results of the Centre Party

Bundestag election results
Year	Votes	Vote share	Seats
1949	727,505	3.1 %	10
1953	217,078	0.8 %	3
1957^{*}	254,322	0.9 %	0
1965^{**}	19,832	0.1 %	0
1969	15,933	0.0 %	0
1987	19,035	0.1 %	0
1994	3,757	0.0 %	0
1998	2,076	0.0 %	0
2002	3,127	0.0 %	0
2005	4,010	0.0 %	0
2009	6,087	0.0 %	0

*) Total votes for Federalist Union (FU), thereof in North Rhine-Westphalia 72,563 = 0.2 percent, in Lower Saxony 13,549 = 0.0 percent
**) Total votes for Christian People's Party (CVP)

Only the years in which the Centre ran for Bundestag elections are listed.

After the Second World War, the Centre ran for state elections in some of the West German federal states, most frequently in North Rhine-Westphalia, where it also succeeded in entering the Landtag in 1947, 1950, and 1954. The party did not participate in any state election in the East German federal states and in Bavaria, Berlin, Bremen, Hesse, and the Saarland. The following table only takes into account the Landtag or Bürgerschaft elections in which the Centre Party competed.

Baden-Württemberg
Year	Votes	Seats
1952	0.9 %	–
1988	0.0 %	–
2006	0.0 %	–

Hamburg
Year	Votes	Seats
1987	0.0 %	–
2008	0.1 %	–

Rhineland-Palatinate
Year	Votes	Seats
1951	2.0 %	–

North Rhine-Westphalia
Year	Votes	Seats
1947	9.8 %	20
1950	7.5 %	16
1954	4.0 %	9
1958	1.1 %	–
1962	0.9 %	–
1966	0.2 %	–
1970	0.1 %	–
1975	0.1 %	–
1980	0.0 %	–
1985	0.0 %	–
1990	0.0 %	–
2005	0.0 %	–
2010	0.1 %	–
2017	0.0 %	–
2022	0.1 %	–

Lower Saxony
Year	Votes	Seats
1947	4.1 %	6
1951	3.3 %	4
1955	1.1 %	1
1959	0.0 %	–
2013	0.0 %*	–

- Direct candidates only

Schleswig-Holstein
Year	Votes	Seats
1947	0.1 %	–

European election results
Year	Votes	Vote share	Seats
1979	31,367	0.1 %	0
1984	93,921	0.4 %	0
1989	41,190	0.1 %	0
1999	7,080	0.0 %	0
2004	26,803	0.1 %	0

In 1994 and since 2009, the Centre did not run in European elections.

== Sources ==
- Arnold, Ulrich (1999). Die Gründung der Zentrumspartei [The founding of the Centre Party]. GRIN. ISBN 978-3-638-97360-1.
- Ayaß, Wolfgang [in German] (2005). "„Wir müssen anfangen, dann werden wir sehen …". Franz Hitze, das Zentrum und die Sozialpolitik bis zum Ende der Bismarckära" ["We have to start, then we will see...". Franz Hitze, the Centre and social policy until the end of the Bismarck era]. In Gabriel, Karl; Große Kracht, Hermann-Josef [in German] (eds.). Franz Hitze (1851–1921): Sozialpolitik und Sozialreform. Paderborn: Schöningh. pp. 37–56.
- Becker, Winfried [in German] (1993). "Kulturkampf". Lexikon für Theologie und Kirche. Vol. 6 (3 ed.). Freiburg.
- Bundeszentrale für politische Bildung (7 October 2016). "Zerstörung der Demokratie 1930–1932" [Destruction of Democracy 1930–1932]. Federal Agency for Civic Education.
- Bundeswahlleiter (2018). "Bundestagswahl 2017" [Bundestag election 2017]. Der Bundeswahlleiter.
- Deutschlandfunk (2016). "Letzter Abwehrversuch" [Last attempt at defense]. Deutschlandfunk.
- "Mit festem Schritt ins Neue Reich" [With a firm step into the New Reich]. Der Spiegel. No. 10. 1965.
- "Früherer AfD-Chef: Jörg Meuthen tritt aus Zentrumspartei aus" [Former AfD boss: Jörg Meuthen leaves Centre Party]. Der Spiegel. 8 September 2023.
- Express (12 February 2011). "Wer ist der wahre Zentrumschef?" [Who is the true Centre boss?]. Express.
- Focus (12 October 2007). "Hamburg: Zentrumspartei trägt Herman Kandidatur an – Deutschland" [Hamburg: Centre Party offers Herman candidacy]. focus.de.
- Gedenkstätte Deutscher Widerstand (2004). "Widerstand gegen den Nationalsozialismus 6. Widerstand aus politischen Grundüberzeugungen" [Resistance against National Socialism 6. Resistance from basic political convictions]. German Resistance Memorial Center.
- Hohorst, Gerd; Kocka, Jürgen; Ritter, Gerhard A. (1978). Sozialgeschichtliches Arbeitsbuch II: Materialien zur Statistik des Kaiserreichs 1870–1914 [Social History Workbook II: Materials on the Statistics of the Empire 1870–1914]. Munich. pp. 173–175.
- Hoyer, Guido (2001). Nichtetablierte christliche Parteien – Deutsche Zentrumspartei, Christliche Mitte, Christliche Partei Deutschlands und Partei Bibeltreuer Christen im Parteiensystem der Bundesrepublik Deutschland [Non-established Christian parties]. Frankfurt am Main: Lang. ISBN 3-631-38203-0.
- Huber, Peter (1992). Uniformierter Reichstag. Die Geschichte der Pseudo-Volksvertretung 1933–1945 [Uniformed Reichstag. The History of the Pseudo-Parliament 1933–1945]. Düsseldorf: Droste. p. 76.
- Idea (2008). "Rubrik – Detailartikel" [Category - Detail Article]. idea.de.
- Kölner Stadt-Anzeiger. "Sie wurden verschleppt und ermordet" [They were abducted and murdered]. Kölner Stadt-Anzeiger.
- Kölnische Volkszeitung (3 March 1909). "Verräter" [Traitors]. Kölnische Volkszeitung. No. 184. p. 1.
- Konrad-Adenauer-Stiftung (2023). "Geschichte der CDU. Zentrumspartei (bis 1933)" [History of the CDU. Centre Party (until 1933)]. Konrad-Adenauer-Stiftung.
- Kühlem, Kordula (2022). "Zentrum und Erster Weltkrieg – vom Burgfrieden zur Regierungsverantwortung" [Centre and First World War – from Burgfrieden to government responsibility]. Konrad-Adenauer-Stiftung (in German).
- Konrad-Adenauer-Stiftung (2022). "Zentrumspartei (bis 1933)" [Centre Party (until 1933)] (in German). Konrad-Adenauer-Stiftung. Archived from the original on 21 January 2022.
- Lokalkompass (28 February 2012). "Landgericht Düsseldorf: Gerhard Woitzik Vorsitzender der Deutschen Zentrumspartei" [Düsseldorf Regional Court: Gerhard Woitzik Chairman of the German Centre Party]. lokalkompass.de.
- May, Georg [in German] (1981). Ludwig Kaas: der Priester, der Politiker und der Gelehrte aus der Schule von Ulrich Stutz [Ludwig Kaas: the priest, the politician and the scholar from the school of Ulrich Stutz]. John Benjamins Publishing. ISBN 90-6032-199-5.
- Mommsen, Hans (2019). Die verspielte Freiheit. Aufstieg und Untergang der Weimarer Republik [The Squandered Freedom. Rise and Fall of the Weimar Republic]. Berlin: Propyläen. p. 312.
- Nietfeld, Joseph (1985). Die Zentrumspartei – Geschichte und Struktur 1945–1958 [The Centre Party – History and Structure 1945–1958] (Dissertation). Braunschweig.
- n-tv (18 January 2022). "Ex-AfD-Politiker bringt Zentrumspartei zurück in den Bundestag" [Ex-AfD politician brings Centre Party back into the Bundestag]. n-tv.de.
- Probst, Robert (19 January 2022). "Zentrumspartei. Ein Relikt der Bismarck-Zeit, heute wieder im Bundestag vertreten" [Centre Party. A relic of the Bismarck era, represented in the Bundestag again today]. Sueddeutsche.de.
- Ritter, Gerhard A.; Niehuss, Merith (1980). Wahlgeschichtliches Arbeitsbuch [Electoral History Workbook]. Munich. pp. 38–42.
- Schulze, H. (3 May 2012). "AUF-PARTEI: "Fusion immer noch das Ziel"" [AUF Party: "Merger still the goal"]. andere-parteien.de.
- Spiegel Online (18 January 2022). "Zentrumspartei kehrt in den Bundestag zurück" [Centre Party returns to the Bundestag]. Spiegel Online.
- Steffen, Tilman [in German] (23 August 2022). "Meuthen verschärft Krise der Zentrumspartei" [Meuthen exacerbates crisis of the Centre Party]. Die Zeit. Zeit Online.
- Tagesschau (2012). "Übersicht der Wahlen seit 1946" [Overview of elections since 1946]. wahl.tagesschau.de.
- Univ. Frankfurt (1933). "Zeitungen, Zeitschriften und Adressbücher / 77. Jahrgang = 21... [3900]". Univ. Frankfurt.
- Weiland, Severin (19 August 2022). "Meuthens Zentrumspartei darf nicht zur Niedersachsen-Wahl antreten" [Meuthen's Centre Party may not run in Lower Saxony election]. Spiegel. No. 34/2022.
- ZDF (23 August 2022). "Ex-AfD-Chef Meuthen in Zentrumspartei gewechselt" [Ex-AfD boss Meuthen switched to Centre Party].
- Zentrumspartei (16 November 2007). "Presseerklärungen" [Press Releases]. Zentrumspartei.
- Zentrumspartei (18 August 2010). "Kontakt" [Contact]. Deutsche Zentrumspartei.
- Zentrumspartei (2011). "Bundesmitgliederversammlung der Deutschen Zentrumspartei" [Federal General Assembly of the German Centre Party] (PDF).
- Zentrumspartei (2022). "Jörg Meuthen tritt Deutscher Zentrumspartei bei" [Jörg Meuthen joins German Centre Party]. ZENTRUM - Deutsche Zentrumspartei. zentrumspartei.de.
- "Bundesmitgliederversammlung vom 20. Februar 2009" [Federal General Assembly of 20 February 2009]. zentrumspartei.eu. 2009.
