= German constitutional reforms of October 1918 =

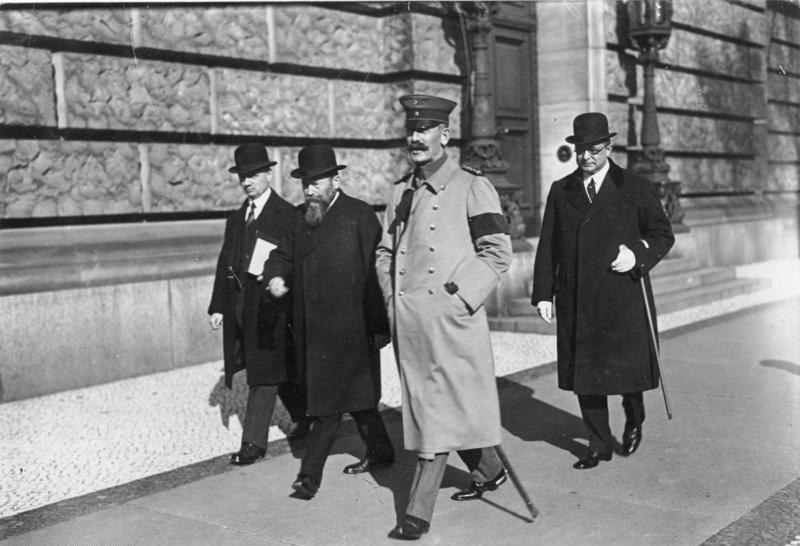
Chancellor Max von Baden (center, in light coat) on his way to the Reichstag, 3 October 1918.

The German constitutional reforms of October 1918 (German: Oktoberreformen) consisted of several constitutional and legislative changes that transformed the German Empire into a parliamentary monarchy for a brief period at the end of the First World War. The reforms, which took effect on 28 October 1918, made the office of chancellor dependent on the confidence of the Reichstag rather than that of the German emperor and required the consent of both the Reichstag and the Bundesrat for declarations of war and for peace agreements.

Although many members of the German Parliament had long favored democratic reforms within the Reich, the immediate impetus for the October reforms was Germany's impending defeat in the war. The Supreme Army Command under Generals Paul von Hindenburg and Erich Ludendorff, in whose hands the real power lay at the time, hoped that democratizing the Reich would lead to better peace conditions from the Allies. They also correctly surmised that if the peace treaty turned out to be unfavorable to Germany, they could place the blame on the political parties that supported the peace.

The reforms came too late to establish a lasting parliamentary monarchy. The German Revolution of 1918–1919 that broke out soon afterwards swept them away. On 9 November a republic was proclaimed and, a short time later, Emperor Wilhelm II formally abdicated. In the summer of 1919 the democratic Weimar Constitution replaced the amended Reich constitution.

== Background ==
=== Political system of the Empire ===
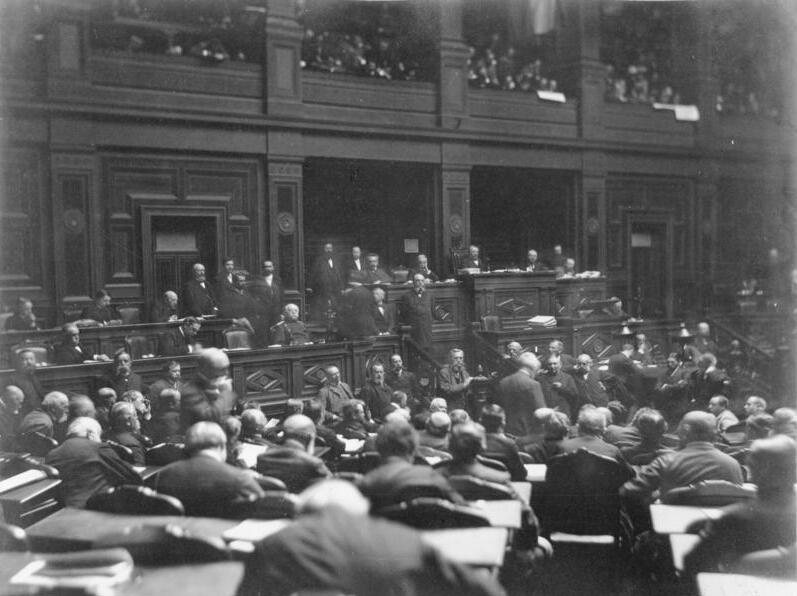
The Imperial Reichstag in session in Berlin.

According to its 1871 constitution, the German Empire was a federation of princes under the permanent presidency of the King of Prussia, who also bore the title of German emperor and was commander-in-chief of the Imperial German Army (Deutsches Heer) and Navy (Kaiserliche Marine). The Bundesrat represented the federal states, and the Reichstag, whose deputies were elected by universal, equal and secret male suffrage, acted as the Parliament. The affairs of state were conducted by the chancellor, who was appointed by the emperor and responsible only to him. The government was not a classic cabinet with responsible departmental ministers but consisted of the chancellor and state secretaries who headed the Reich offices and had only limited freedom of action.

Only the Reichstag and the Bundesrat could propose laws, and every proposal required the approval of both bodies in order to have legal force. A key power of the Reichstag was the right to approve the state budget, but on military expenditures, which were its largest item, it could vote only en bloc and for a period of seven years, restrictions which limited its parliamentary right of control over the Army and Navy.

=== World War I ===
When World War I broke out in 1914, the parliamentary groups in the Reichstag supported the war effort, including the Social Democratic Party of Germany (SPD), which was the largest single party in Parliament but until then had been in opposition to the government. During the course of the war, willingness to follow imperial policy declined, and in July 1917 the majority of the Reichstag passed the Reichstag Peace Resolution seeking an early negotiated peace. Although it did not succeed in persuading Reich leadership to change its policy, the parties that backed the resolution continued to work together. Their forum for cooperation was called the Inter-Party Committee (Interfraktionelle Ausschuß) and resembled a coalition. In addition to the Social Democrats, it included the Catholic Centre Party and the Progressive People's Party.

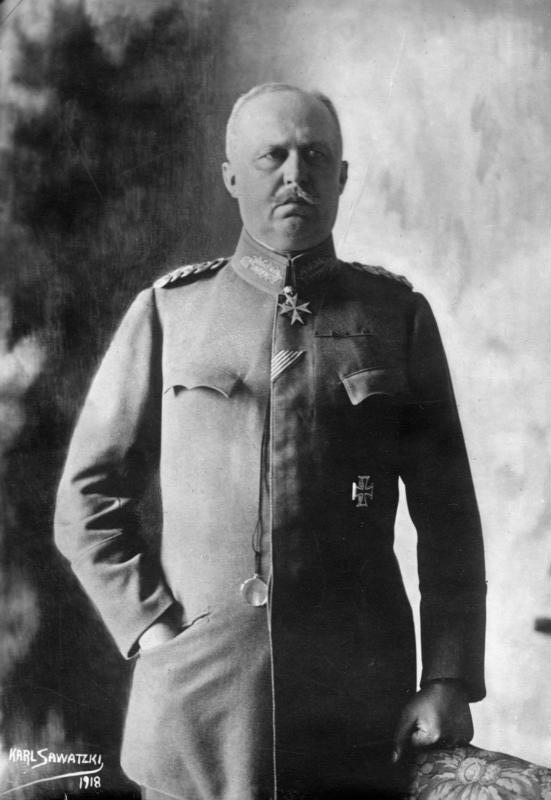
Erich Ludendorff

In the second half of 1918, Germany's military situation worsened substantially. In late September Paul von Hindenburg and Erich Ludendorff, believing that the United States would be more likely to negotiate with a new Reich leadership, advocated appointing deputies from the Inter-Party Committee to the government so that they could seek a favorable peace agreement. The Supreme Army Command also saw it as a chance to shift the responsibility for an unfavorable treaty to the parties that had supported the peace resolution. On 1 October Ludendorff said to his staff:

"I have asked His Majesty to bring those circles into the government which we have to thank for coming to this pass. [...] Let them now make the peace which has to be made. They can eat the soup that they have prepared for us!"

Prince Max of Baden, the heir presumptive to the throne of Baden, a prince not affiliated with any political party and considered to be liberal, was appointed chancellor by the Emperor on 3 October 1918. His ministers included for the first time politicians from the SPD. Through the Emperor he obtained Ludendorff's dismissal and the cessation of unrestricted submarine warfare, but the United States expected further democratization of the Reich.

== Adoption ==
=== The two government bills ===
Undersecretary Theodor Lewald of the Ministry of the Interior had presented a reform bill on 3 October that would have made little change to the political system. It proposed deleting the constitution's Article 21 §2 so that a Reichstag member could assume a Reich or other state office without losing his seat. It also amended the Deputy Act so that a deputy to the chancellor could not at the same time be a member of the Bundesrat. The Bundesrat approved the bill, and the chancellor forwarded it to the Reichstag on 10 October.

As foreign policy issues continued to develop, the desire was to support the German peace negotiators by formally giving the Reichstag a voice both in declarations of war and in peace agreements. Article 11 of the constitution was therefore to be given new paragraphs stating that not only the Bundesrat but also the Reichstag had to approve declarations of war (paragraph 2), and that peace agreements had to be approved by both bodies as well (paragraph 3). On 15 October the Bundesrat adopted the bill, but some individual state governments complained about the time pressure and therefore had no vote written into the minutes.

Some members of the Bundesrat protested that Chancellor Max von Baden intended to announce at the next session of the Reichstag that he would introduce a bill for parliamentary accountability. This would mean the Bundesrat taking second place to the Reichstag. Because of opposition from individual states, Baden postponed his plan until 22 October.

At its meeting on 17 October, the Inter-Party Committee unanimously opposed the two bills because they did not advance parliamentarization decisively enough. They thought that the chancellor should be responsible to Parliament and that the military should be subordinated to civil authority. The parliamentary parties nevertheless did not raise objections at that point.

=== Baden's Reichstag speech and motion by the parliamentary groups ===
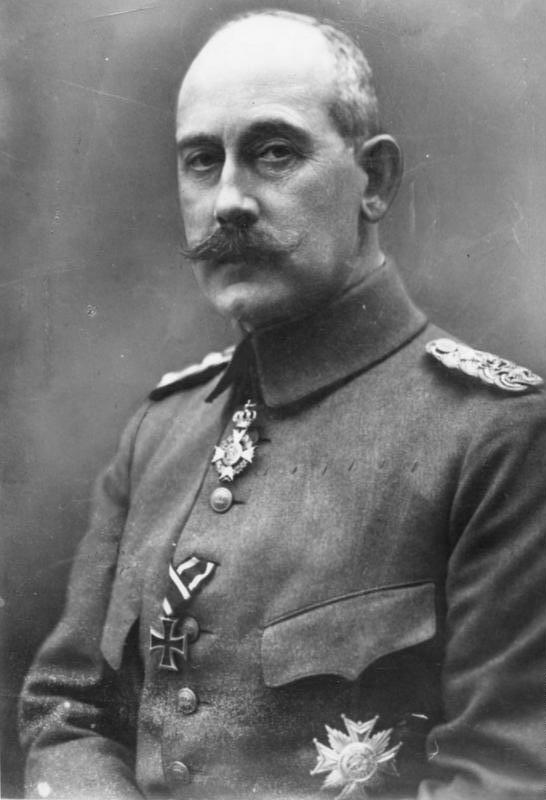
Max von Baden

In the Reichstag on 22 October, Baden did not commit himself to a chancellor who was formally accountable to Parliament. He said that a chancellor or state secretary could of course not remain in office without the confidence of the majority in the Reichstag but that Germany should not resort to forms of government that were not in keeping with its traditions. He announced a bill by which a state court would punish the head of government for acting unconstitutionally. Speakers from the majority parties called for formal constitutional rules for the transition to a parliamentary system of government.

A draft of the proposal by the majority parliamentary parties was then adopted and revised by the government. The result was submitted as an initiative by the parliamentary groups on 26 October. Because of that approach, it was unnecessary to involve the Bundesrat, since it was not considered a governmental motion even though in substance it was. Objections from the opposition were overruled by the Reichstag majority. The conservatives saw the proposals as a path to radical democratization and the Independent Social Democrats (USPD), a left-wing splinter party that had broken away from the SPD in 1917, as merely a patch on the militarist coat.

On 24 October the Reichstag, as if anticipating the new system, formally expressed its confidence in the Chancellor 193 to 52, with 23 abstentions. The parties of the parliamentary majority voted in favor and the conservative parties and USPD against. The abstentions came from the German, Polish and Alsace–Lorraine parties. On 25 and 26 October the Reichstag majority approved the government's bills with the amendments it had made to them. The sittings were the last two sessions of the imperial Reichstag elected in 1912. On 28 October the Bundesrat approved the bills, and on the same day, after imperial issuance and promulgation, they came into force.

Emperor Wilhelm II wanted to give the reform laws his own meaning by issuing an imperial decree immediately after their approval on 28 October. It stated that the transfer of fundamental rights from the emperor to the people concluded a constitutional epoch that had enabled the people to make great achievements, as for example during the four years of war, and that the Emperor acceded to the decisions of the Reichstag. The Chancellor delayed publication of the decree in order that Wilhelm's declarations would have no effect on the public.

== The individual reforms ==
=== Position of state secretaries ===
According to the first reform law, Reichstag deputies could be appointed to the Reich government and remain deputies (Article 21), but they could not become members of the Bundesrat (unlike members of the government who were not Reichstag deputies). The deputies Matthias Erzberger, Adolf Gröber, Karl Trimborn (all Centre Party), Conrad Haußmann (Progressive People's Party), and Philipp Scheidemann (SPD), who had previously been assigned to perform the duties of state secretaries, could thus be officially appointed state secretaries and remain deputies. The same applied to Otto Fischbeck in the Prussian Ministry of State.

Per the amended Deputation Act (Stellvertretungsgesetz), a state secretary without portfolio could become a "proxy" for the chancellor, giving him the power to countersign and making him responsible to Parliament. Those state secretaries who were not members of the Bundesrat were given speaking rights in the Reichstag. The constitutional historian Ernst Rudolf Huber saw it as the realization of the "full equality and collegialization" that was important during the transitional period from November 1918 to February 1919, since the state secretaries remained in office even when the Reichstag was no longer in session.

Parliament did not insist that Article 9 §2 of the constitution be reformed. It prohibited anyone from being a member of the Bundesrat and the Reichstag at the same time. A chancellor or state secretary who wanted to remain a member of the Reichstag could not become a Prussian Bundesrat delegate. Under the Empire it had been a matter of course for chancellors to be Prussian ministers president at the same time and also to cast votes on Prussian matters.

=== War and peace ===
According to the second law, both declarations of war and peace agreements required the consent of the Reichstag and the Bundesrat. The emperor could no longer declare war on his own, not even in a purely defensive case. It should be noted, however, that in August 1914 the Bundesrat had approved the declarations of war and the Reichstag had approved war financing. The Reichstag and the Bundesrat had also been involved in the peace treaty with Russia at the beginning of 1918.

=== Confidence of Parliament in the chancellor ===
Under the new Article 15 §3 of the constitution (also amended by the second law), the Reichstag could force the chancellor to resign by a vote of no confidence. The emperor then had to dismiss the chancellor. The appointment of a new chancellor, the process of which was not specifically spelled out, still appeared to be at the emperor's initiative.

=== Accountability of the chancellor and ministers ===
According to the new Article 15 §4, whenever the emperor was exercising his constitutional powers, the chancellor was accountable for all of his political acts. This applied to decrees and to statements and speeches, which by their nature were not formally countersigned by the chancellor. The emperor's military right of command (Kommandogewalt) was also the chancellor's responsibility and thus subject to parliamentary control.

The new Article 15 §5 made the chancellor and ministers responsible to both the Bundesrat and the Reichstag for their conduct in office. The article clarified existing law, with the system remaining federal because of the accountability to the Bundesrat, although it was only the Reichstag that could force the chancellor to resign. The state secretaries (ministers) became accountable in the same way as the chancellor, but the Reichstag could not pass a vote of no confidence against them. Ernst Huber wrote: "The differing provisions were improvised rather than fully thought out. The clear intention was nevertheless to give the Reichstag constitutional priority over the Bundesrat with the right of votes of confidence or no confidence. The October laws unmistakably relegated the Bundesrat to second place."

=== The military ===
Imperial standard, reading "God with us 1870".

The Imperial German Army was composed of the contingents of the individual states of Prussia, Bavaria, Württemberg and Saxony, with the emperor holding supreme command. The second reform law put an end to his independence in the command of the armed forces. Through the chancellor, the Reichstag was to have control over the military command personnel of the Army and Navy, either directly or indirectly. Military administration and matters of direct command nevertheless remained separate, with the latter not subject to parliamentary control.

The Ministers of War of Prussia, Bavaria, Württemberg and Saxony were responsible to the Bundesrat and the Reichstag (new Article 66 §4) and had to countersign the appointment, transfer, promotion and retirement of Army officers and officials in their state's contingent (new Article 66 §3). In the case of the Navy, the chancellor countersigned (new Article 51 §1, sentence 3). He also countersigned the appointments of the supreme commanders of the contingents and other senior military officers (new Article 64 §2).

== Developments following adoption ==
The day after the reform laws were announced, on 29 October, the mutiny of the German High Seas Fleet began. Within a few days, the revolt of a small number of ships' crews developed into the Kiel mutiny and eventually into the German Revolution of 1918–1919. In more and more German cities the insurgents formed soviet-style workers' and soldiers' councils that took power at the local and, in many cases, the state level.

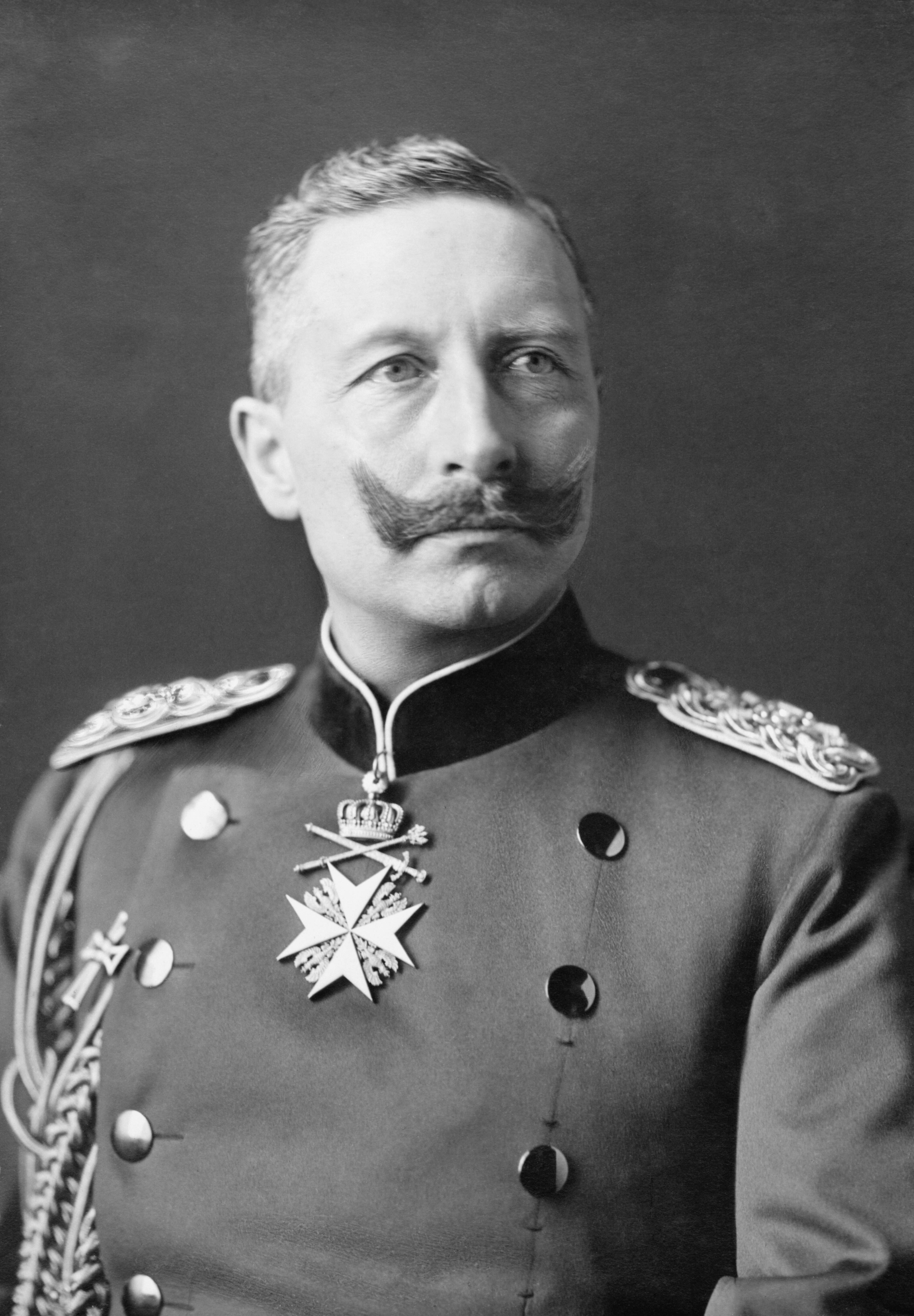
Kaiser Wilhelm II in 1902.

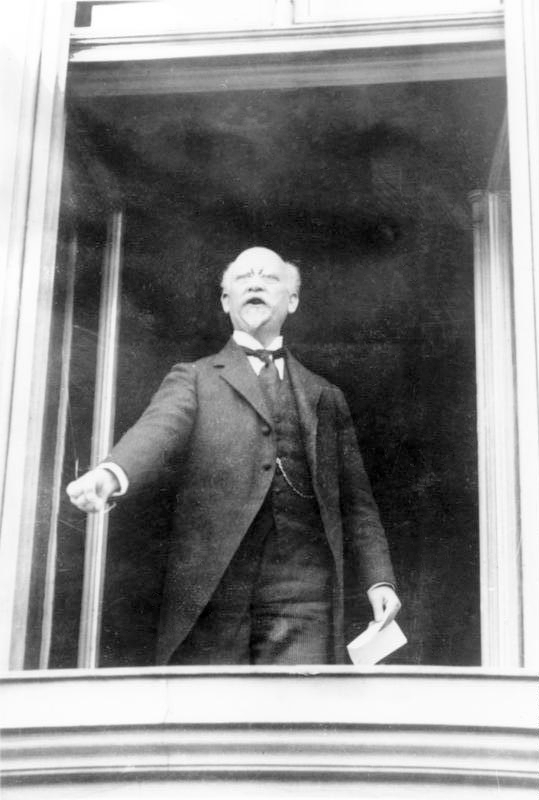
Philipp Scheidemann proclaims the republic from the Reichstag building.

U.S. President Woodrow Wilson had implicitly demanded the Kaiser's abdication in his replies to the German request for an armistice. While the SPD leadership, like the bourgeois parties, was prepared in principle to accept a parliamentary monarchy under a new emperor, its supporters, the workers' and soldiers' councils, the Independent Social Democrats and the Spartacus League advocated the abolition of the monarchy. To forestall such demands, Max von Baden spent several days trying in vain to persuade Wilhelm II to abdicate. Fearing that he would lose control of the situation in Berlin, and in order to prevent a civil war, the Chancellor on his own authority proclaimed the Emperor's abdication on 9 November and handed the reins of government to the Social Democrat Friedrich Ebert. Such an action was not covered by the Reich's constitution even after the October reforms. To anticipate the proclamation of a socialist soviet republic planned by the Spartacist Karl Liebknecht, the Social Democrat Philipp Scheidemann proclaimed a republic on the same day. On 11 November Germany signed the Armistice of Compiègne.

The Social Democratic-led government called elections on 19 January 1919 for a National Assembly that would give Germany a new constitution. On 11 August 1919, the democratic Weimar Constitution was promulgated. It provided for a Reich president whose powers were similar to those of the former emperor as limited by the October constitutional reforms. The Reich president appointed and dismissed the chancellor and ministers, and they were dependent on the confidence of the majority of the Reichstag. Parliament could force the resignation of the chancellor or ministers, but the constitution did not have a constructive vote of no confidence to block Parliament from forcing out a chancellor unless it had a majority to build a new government. The lack of the provision – such as exists in the constitution of the Federal Republic of Germany – contributed significantly to the political instability of the republic. The constitutional law expert Huber was of the opinion that in drafting the October reforms the parties had already accepted the risk of an inability to form a majority.

== Evaluation ==
Less than two weeks after the reform laws were passed, the Council of the People's Deputies took power as a revolutionary transitional government. It is therefore impossible to say how Germany would have developed under the changed constitution and the electoral reforms which were completed in the Reich and in process in Prussia. According to historian Gunther Mai, the pressure of time on writing the reforms "ultimately simply codified the change in constitutional practice as it had already crystallized when Max von Baden's government was established."

Mai thought that unclear regulations left areas of potential conflict open, with the result that it is not certain if democratization through parliamentarization would have succeeded in the long run. The unresolved questions included whether the emperor should continue to propose a chancellor and whether he had to involve the Reichstag in making the decision. The reforms overall were far-reaching and hasty, yet at the same time too half-hearted to avert the threat of revolution from below. Ultimately, the people and symbols of the old imperial power remained.

The constitutional reform was possible only with the involvement of the majority parliamentary groups. Historian Thomas Nipperdey was of the opinion that it was therefore not accurate, as some have done, to speak of a revolution from above. "The parties did not let themselves be ordered into a revolution; they made their own demands, and it was they who forced the change." The demands of the majority parties were largely met. The new system was improvised, remnants of the old one remained, and it is not known whether the Emperor and the military would have permanently accepted parliamentarization. Above all, the domestic situation was coming to a head: "The October reforms had no effect on their own but were absorbed into the radicalization of the German Revolution." The revolution was not accidental, since within "the life and world of the people, the authoritarian state" with its hierarchies and militarism "was much more than could have been eliminated by a few, albeit fundamental, changes to the constitution." According to Nipperdey the reform came too late, and despite the change of power was not enough.
