= Karl Trimborn =

German politician (1854–1921))

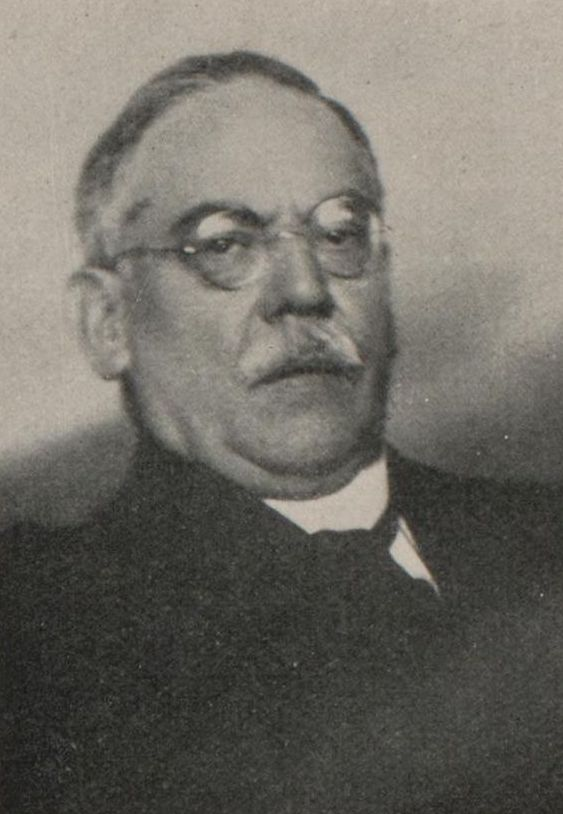
Karl Trimborn (1921)

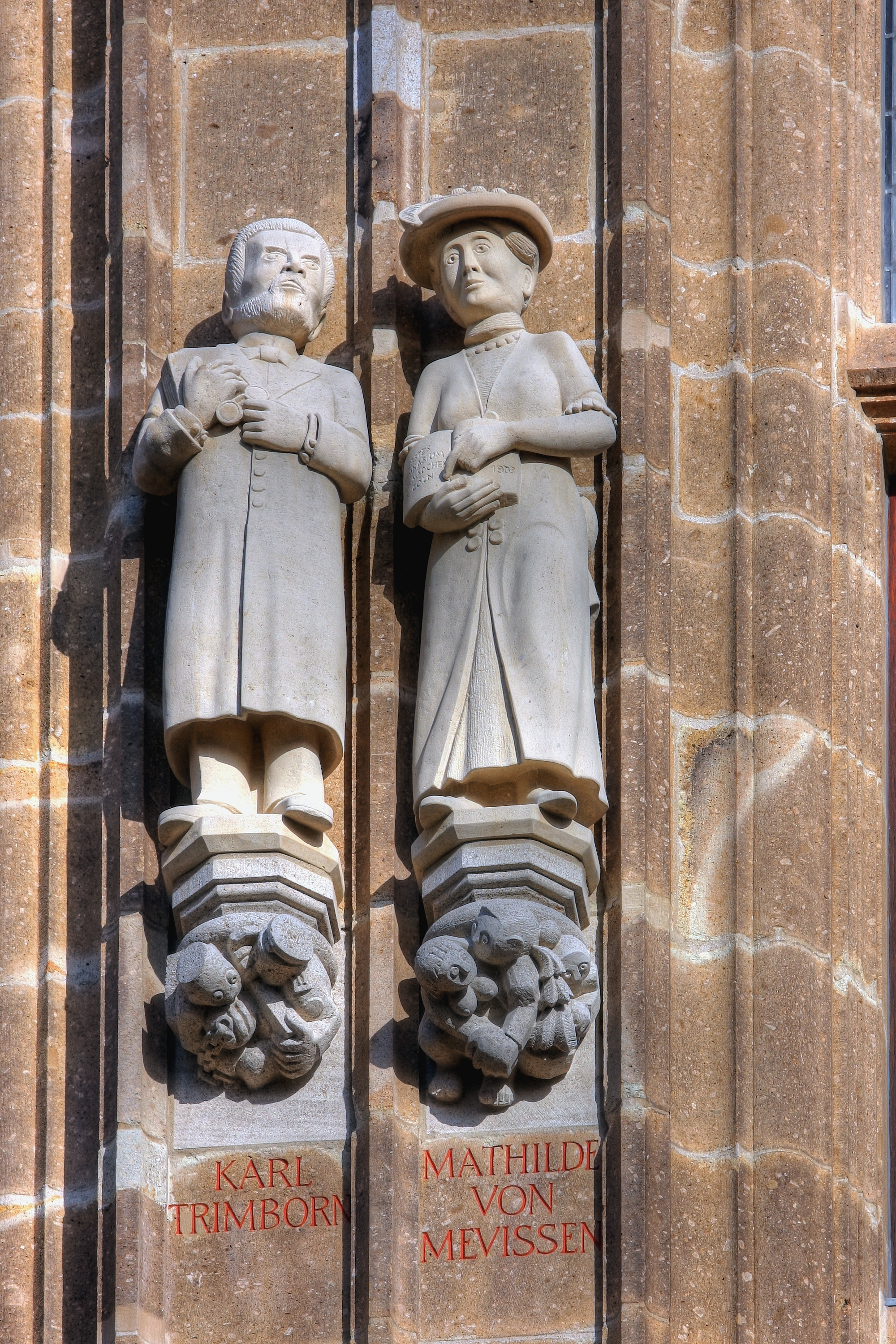
Statue of Karl Trimborn at Kölner Rathausturm. right: Mathilde von Mevissen

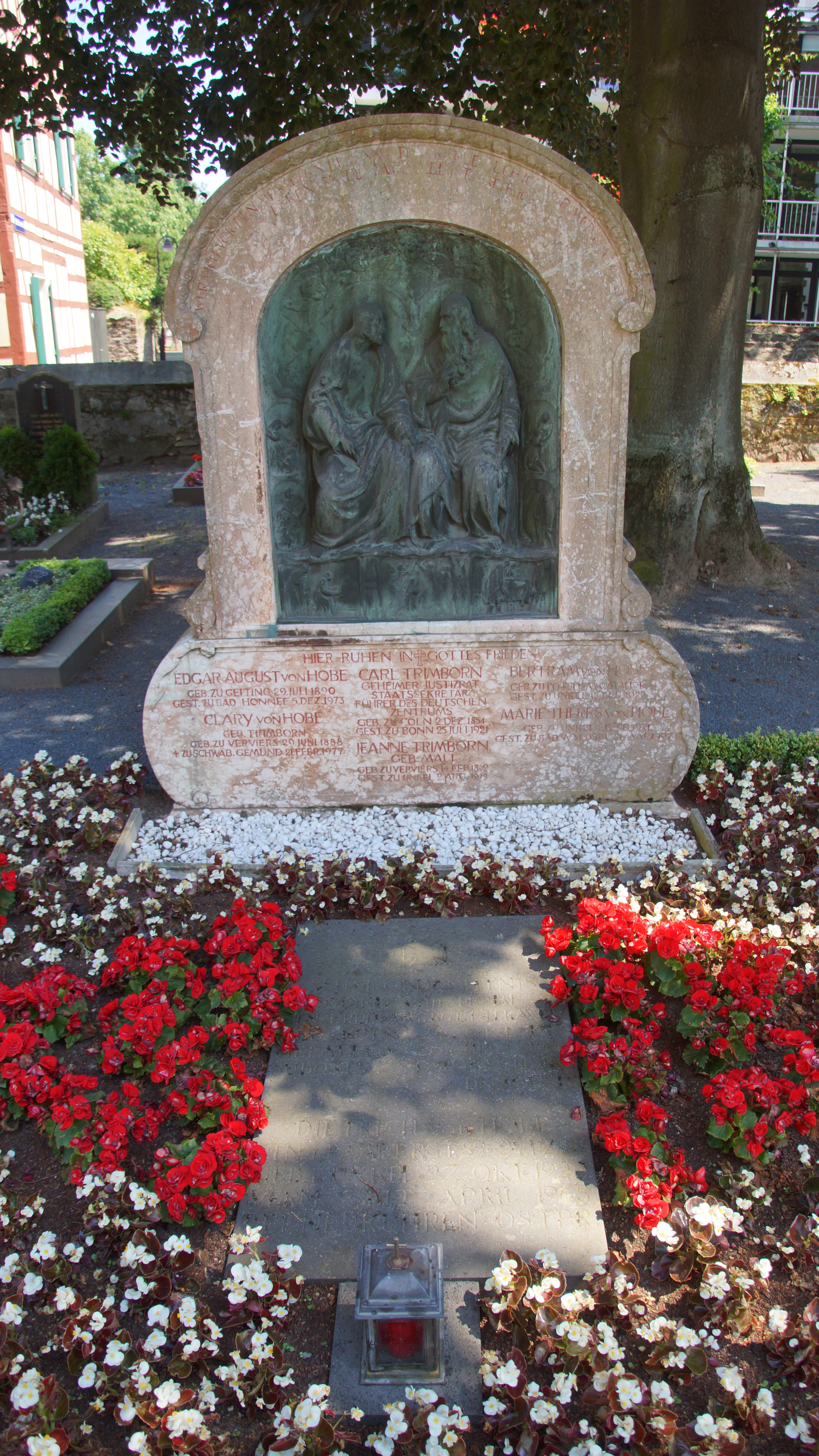
cementary of Karl Trimborn in Unkel

Karl Trimborn (born December 2, 1854 in Cologne; died July 25, 1921 in Bonn) was a German politician of the Centre Party.

== Life ==
Trimborn studied German law in Munich and Strasbourg and worked from 1882 to 1904 as a lawyer in Cologne. From 1890 Trimborn was a member of the People's Association for Catholic Germany. From 1894 to 1913 Trimborn was a member of the city council of Cologne. From 1896 to 1918 Trimborn was a member of the German Reichstag and the Prussian parliament. From 1919 to 1920 he succeeded politician Adolf Gröber as leading spokesman. From 1919 to 1920 he was a member of the Weimar National Assembly. He was a recipient of the Iron Cross.

== Literature about Trimborn ==
- Christoph Kuhl (2016). "Trimborn, Carl". Neue Deutsche Biographie (in German). Vol. 26. Berlin: Duncker & Humblot. pp. 420–421. (full text online).
- Christoph Kuhl: Carl Trimborn 1854–1921. Eine politische Biographie. (= Veröffentlichungen der Kommission für Zeitgeschichte. Reihe B, Forschungen, Band 120). Schöningh, Paderborn 2011, ISBN 978-3-506-77121-6.
- Eckhard Hansen, Florian Tennstedt (ed.) u. a.: Biographisches Lexikon zur Geschichte der deutschen Sozialpolitik 1871 bis 1945. edition 1: Sozialpolitiker im Deutschen Kaiserreich 1871 bis 1918. Kassel University Press, Kassel 2010, ISBN 978-3-86219-038-6, p. 164 (Online, PDF; 2,2 MB).
- Gabriele Kranstedt: Katholische Mädchensozialarbeit in Köln seit über 100 Jahren. Gründungsgeschichte. ed. by IN VIA Verband Katholischer Mädchensozialarbeit Köln e. V., Cologne 2001.
- Rudolf Morsey, Gerold Schmidt: Karl und Jeanne Trimborn. in: Lexikon für Theologie und Kirche. Third edition. 10. Band, Freiburg in Breisgau 2001, p. 238.
- Rudolf Morsey: Karl Trimborn (1854–1921). in: Jürgen Aretz, Rudolf Morsey, Anton Rauscher (ed.): Zeitgeschichte in Lebensbildern, Aus dem deutschen Katholizismus des 19. und 20. Jahrhunderts, Band 1, Aschendorff Verlag GmbH & Co. KG, Münster 2022, ISBN 978-3-402-06112-1, p. 81–93.
- Gerold Schmidt: 100 Jahre IN VIA Verband Katholischer Mädchensozialarbeit in Köln. in: not-wendig. Katholische Mädchensozialarbeit Köln 1898–1998. Cologne 1998.
- Michael F. Feldkamp in Siegfried Koß, Wolfgang Löhr (Hrsg.): Biographisches Lexikon des KV. 3. Teil (= Revocatio historiae. Band 4). SH-Verlag, Schernfeld 1994, ISBN 3-89498-014-1, p. 113 ff.
