= Joseph Joos =

German politician (1878–1965)

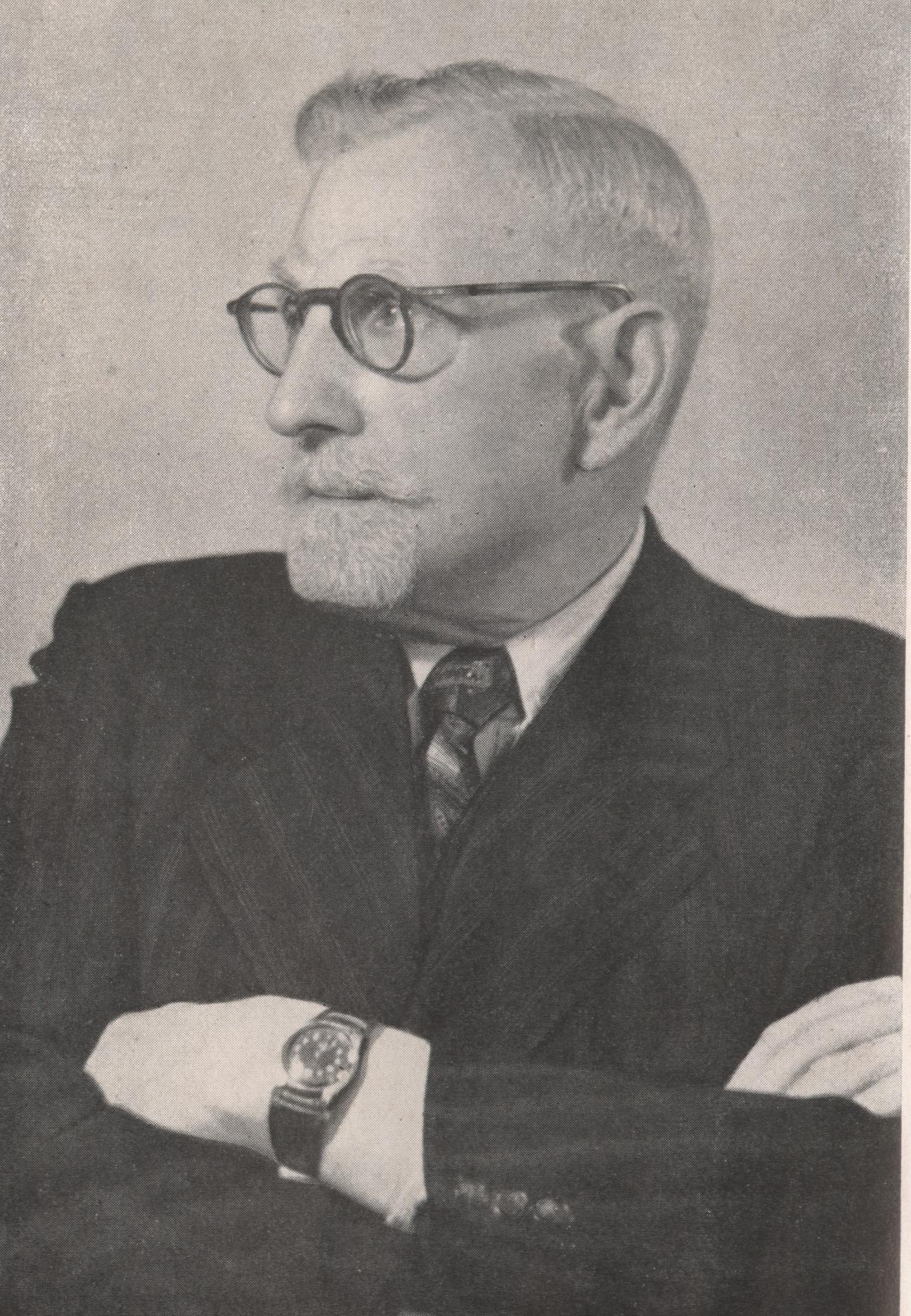
- Joos in 1938

Member of the Reichstag (Weimar Republic)
- In office 1920–1933

Personal details
- Born: 13 November 1878 Wintzenheim, Kolmar, Alsace–Lorraine, German Empire (modern-day France)
- Died: 13 March 1965 (aged 86) St. Gallen, Switzerland
- Party: Zentrum (until 1933); Christian Democratic Union (1949-1965)

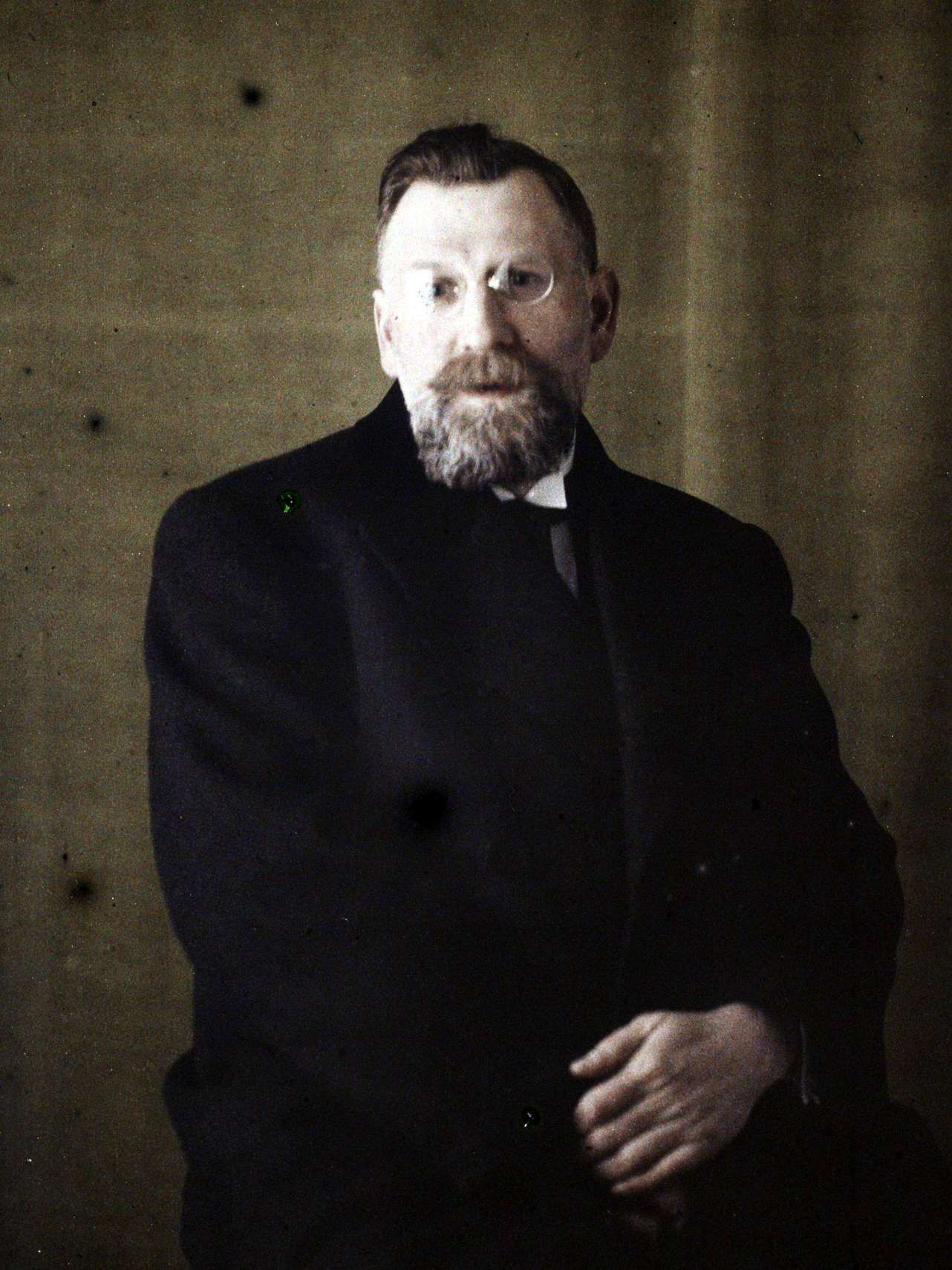
Autochrome portrait by Georges Chevalier, 1931

Joseph Joos (13 November 1878 – 13 March 1965) was a prominent German intellectual and politician. As a Member of Parliament in Weimar, Joseph Joos grew to become one of the leading voices of the Centre Party in Germany. His convictions led him to become a political prisoner in the Dachau concentration camp from 1941 to 1945. After World War II, Joseph Joos became a close advisor to West Germany's Chancellor Konrad Adenauer.

== Early life ==
Joseph Joos was born on 13 November 1878 in Wintzenheim, near Colmar in Alsace, a region long disputed between France and Germany. At this time, Alsace was a part of Germany, which led Joos to follow the German education system. Following high school in Mulhouse and an apprenticeship in carpentry, Joos became the editor of the Ober-Elsaessischen Landeszeitung, an Alsatian newspaper. As a committed Catholic, Joos got involved with the Volksverein für das katholische Deutschland (People’s Association for a Catholic Germany) in Mönchengladbach.

== Career ==
He eventually became the editor of the Westdeutschen Arbeiterzeitung, the newspaper of the Catholic Workers’ Associations; which focused more on education and less on economic issues. Under his leadership, WAZ focused on the special concerns of Catholic workers. During World War 1 it emphasized domestic issues, especially censorship.

After France took over Alsace following the 1919 Treaty of Versailles, Joos decided to remain involved in German politics. After the November Revolution, Joos, with his knowledge of the condition in the Rhineland was asked by the Zentrum Party to stand for election in the Reichstag. He was successfully elected and served as an MP without interruption until the Nazi takeover. As a member of the Zentrum Party Joos initially joined with the party's left wing, led by Matthias Erzberger and Joseph Wirth. He championed the Weimar Coalition and supported the republican paramilitary the Reichsbanner. However, in 1926 he broke with Wirth and became increasingly conservative. As a thinker, he wrote extensively on the role of the Zentrum party in Weimar society and worked toward the reconciliation of German Catholics with the state.

Throughout this time, he retained his position within the WAZ, he became chairman in 1927 of the enlarged Reichsverband katholische Arbeiter- und Arbeiterinnenvereine (National Association of Catholic Worker Associations). In 1928 he became chairman of the Catholic Workers’ International, and from this role he advocated conciliation with France and closer Franco-German ties. In 1928 and 1929 he played key roles at conferences of the International Alliance of Christian Democratic Parties.

Joos was well liked within his party, but when Wilhelm Marx retired as party chairman in 1928, Joos was indifferent to the idea of replacing him and instead supported Adam Stegerwald. This led to the ascension of Ludwig Kaas to the role, though Joos was made deputy chairman. After the 1932 German Presidential Election he initially supported Paul Von Hindenburg's rule by decree, seeing it as a bulwark against extremism. Though he soon sought a return to parliamentary rule and supported a coalition with the NSDAP, naively thinking this would accomplish his goal. His parliamentary leanings led him to sponsor a Zentrum Party vote against the Enabling Act though as this position was in the minority he maintained party discipline and voted for the Act.

== Nazi Rule ==
An outspoken opponent of the National Socialist movement since its early days, when the Nazi Party came to power Joos' political party came under a lot of pressure and his publications were often censored. In 1938, the Nazi authorities stripped Joos of his German citizenship as Alsatians were not considered reliable citizens in the imminence of a war. In 1940, Joos moved to Köln (Cologne) but was denounced and arrested for helping the French resistance in Alsace. In 1940, he was transferred to prisoner camp in Weissenburg in Bayern, in July 1941 to the Gestapo jail in Nuremberg and subsequently to the concentration camp of Dachau. In April 1945, he was transferred with about 140 other political prisoners to Niederdorf. He was freed in May 1945.

== Later Life ==
As Alsace was now part of France and since Joos had lost his German citizenship, he was sent back to France. In 1949, Joos moved back to Germany but refused to take the German citizenship. Until 1960, he lived in Fulda. Joos became involved again with the German Christian Democrats. Thanks to his personal background and his credibility with the new German government as well as with the French Resistance, Joos became a prominent advocate for a European Union. He rejoined the Christian Democratic Union and became a special advisor on European Affairs to the German Chancellor Konrad Adenauer. In 1960, he moved to St. Gallen in Switzerland for health reasons. He died in St. Gallen on 13 March 1965.

Thanks to his lifelong piety and activism, on 8 December 1954, Joseph Joos was ordered Knight of the Order of the Holy Sepulchre of Jerusalem by Cardinal Nicola Canali, President of the Pontifical Commission for Vatican City State and Grand Master of the Order of the Holy Sepulchre of Jerusalem.

== Public Office ==
Joseph Joos attended the Weimar National Assembly in January 1919 in his capacity of representative of the Christian Democrats of the Rhein region. He then became a full-time Christian Democrat deputy at the Weimar Reichsteig until November 1933.

- 1920-1933: Member of the Zentrum (Center Party) coalition in Parliament
- 1922: President of the Deutschen Katolischen Katholikentags in Munich and Chairperson of the Windthorstbundes, a youth organization of the Center Party
- 1926-1932: Member of the Reichsbanner Schwarz-Rot-Gold organization
- 1927: Chairman of the German Catholic Worker Movement
- 1928: Chairman of the international Catholic Worker Movement
- 1928: Member of the Volksverein für das katholische Deutschland (People Association for a Catholic Germany)
- 1933: Resignation from the management board of the Central Committee of German Catholics (ZdK)
