= Miłoszyce =

- Village
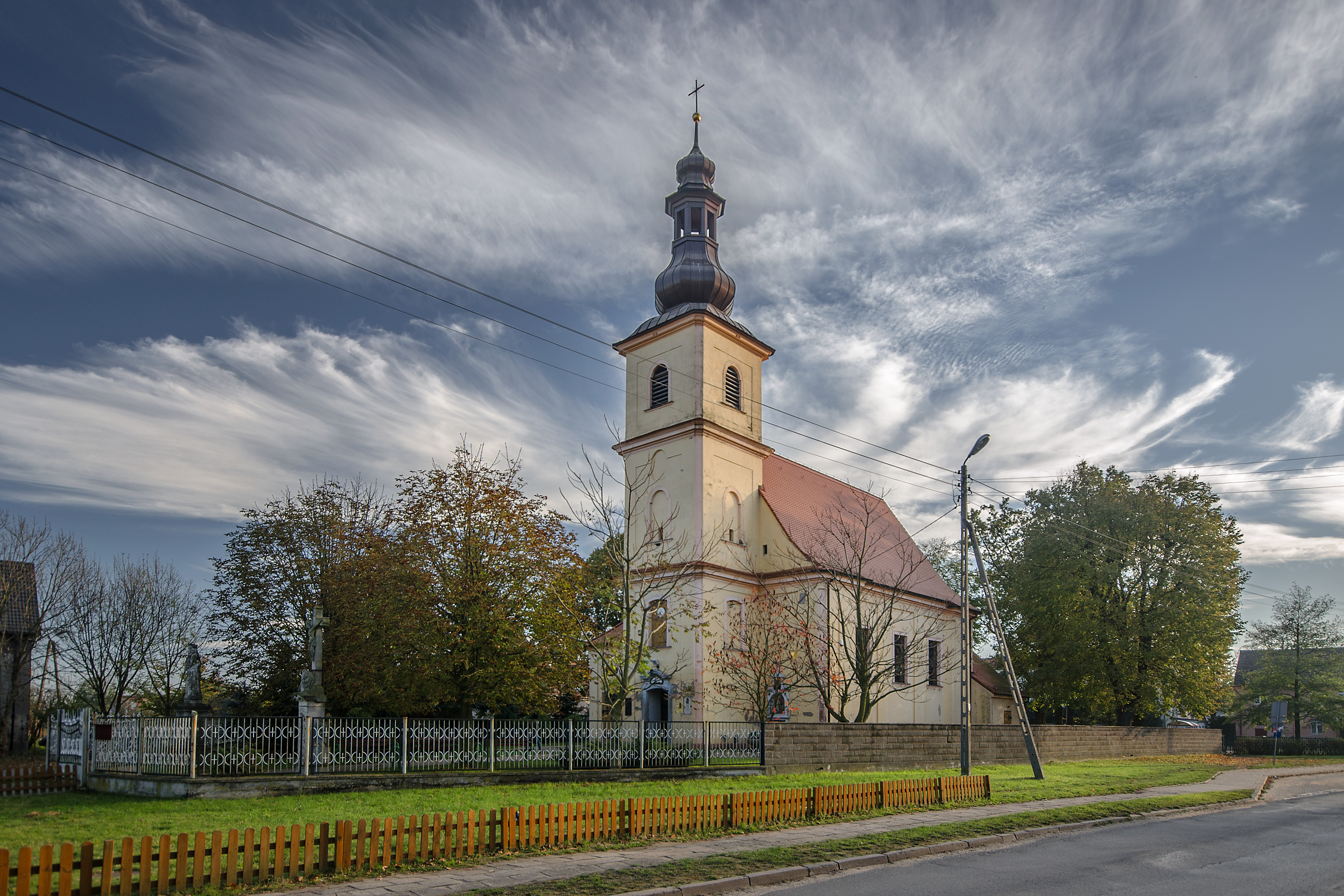
- Church of Saint Nicholas in Miłoszyce

- Location within Poland
- Coordinates: 51°3′N 17°19′E
- Country: Poland
- Voivodeship: Lower Silesian
- County: Oława
- Gmina: Jelcz-Laskowice
- Time zone: UTC+1 (CET)
  - Summer (DST): UTC+2 (CEST)

Miłoszyce [miwɔˈʂɨt͡sɛ] (German: Meleschwitz) is a village in the administrative district of Gmina Jelcz-Laskowice, within Oława County, Lower Silesian Voivodeship, in south-western Poland.

== History ==
Miłoszyce dates back to the Middle Ages. The oldest known mention comes from a document of Pope Innocent IV from 1245.

During World War II the Germans established and operated the largest subcamp of the Gross-Rosen concentration camp in the village. Over 6,000 men, mostly Poles, but also Jews, the French, Belgians, the Dutch, Czechs, Russians, Croats, were imprisoned there as forced laborers. Prisoners were given very low food rations and one set of clothes for the entire period of imprisonment. Prisoners washed in group baths with cold water once every two weeks, also in freezing conditions, which led to the deaths of many of them. There were terrible sanitary conditions in the camp. In total, around 2,000 people died there. In January 1945 the Germans evacuated most prisoners to Gross-Rosen in a "death march", in which around 1,000 prisoners died, also as a result of executions and cold. Around 300 ill prisoners were left in the camp hospital, where they liberated by the Soviets on 23 January 1945.

== Gallery ==
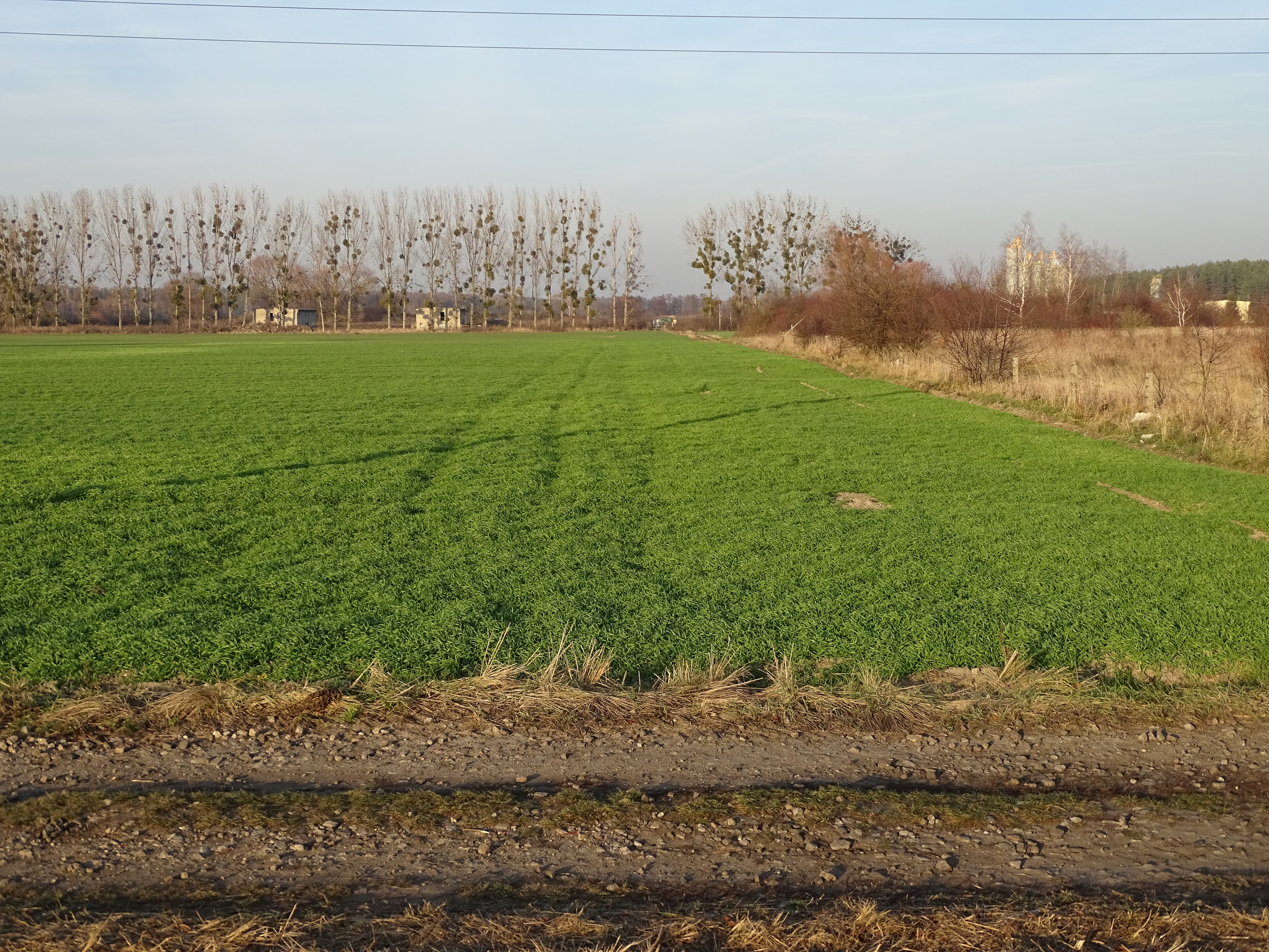
Place of the former Nazi German concentration camp with barracks for prisoners built in 1944 in the background on the left

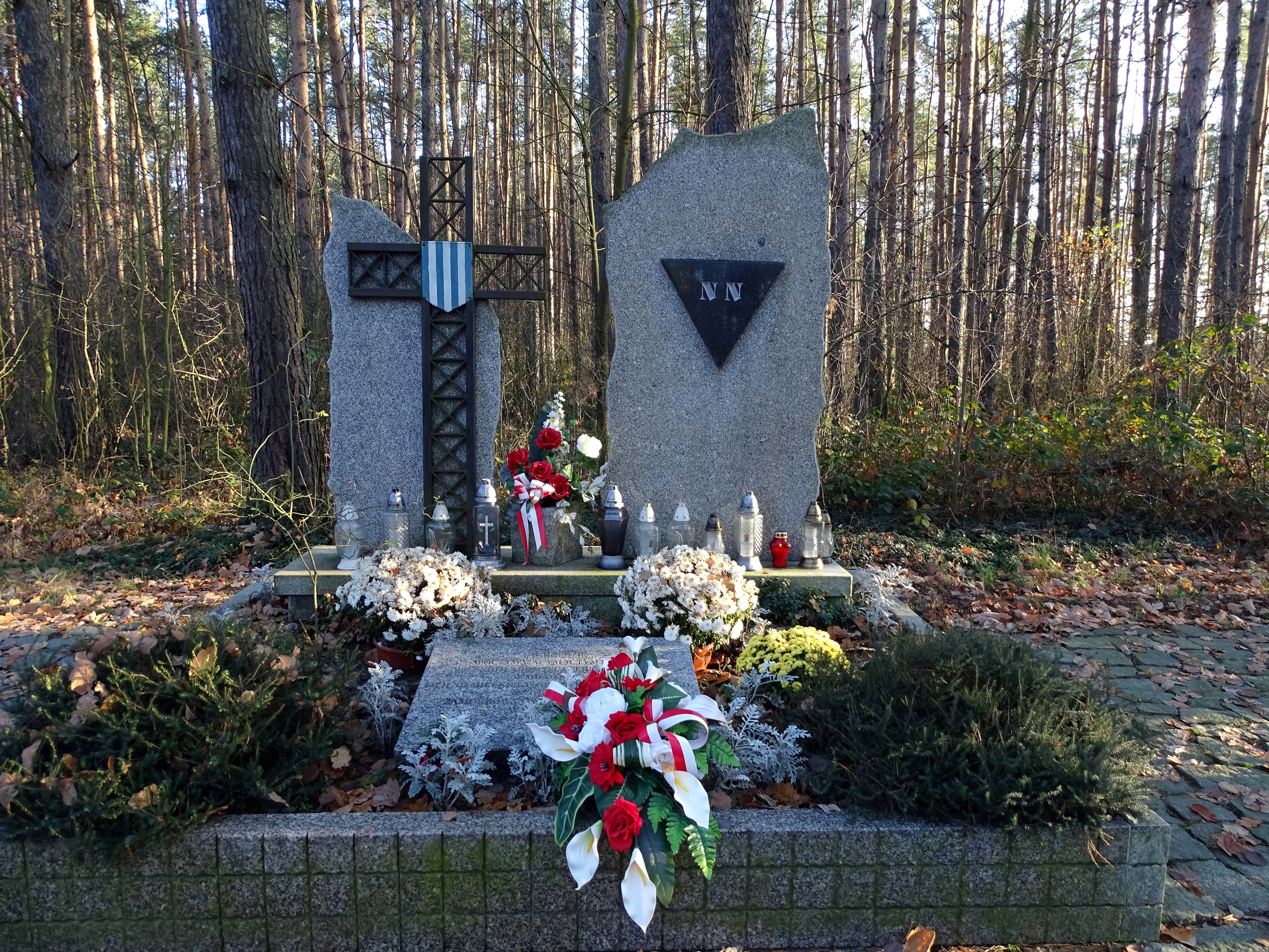
Memorial on the grave of victims of the local subcamp of Gross-Rosen

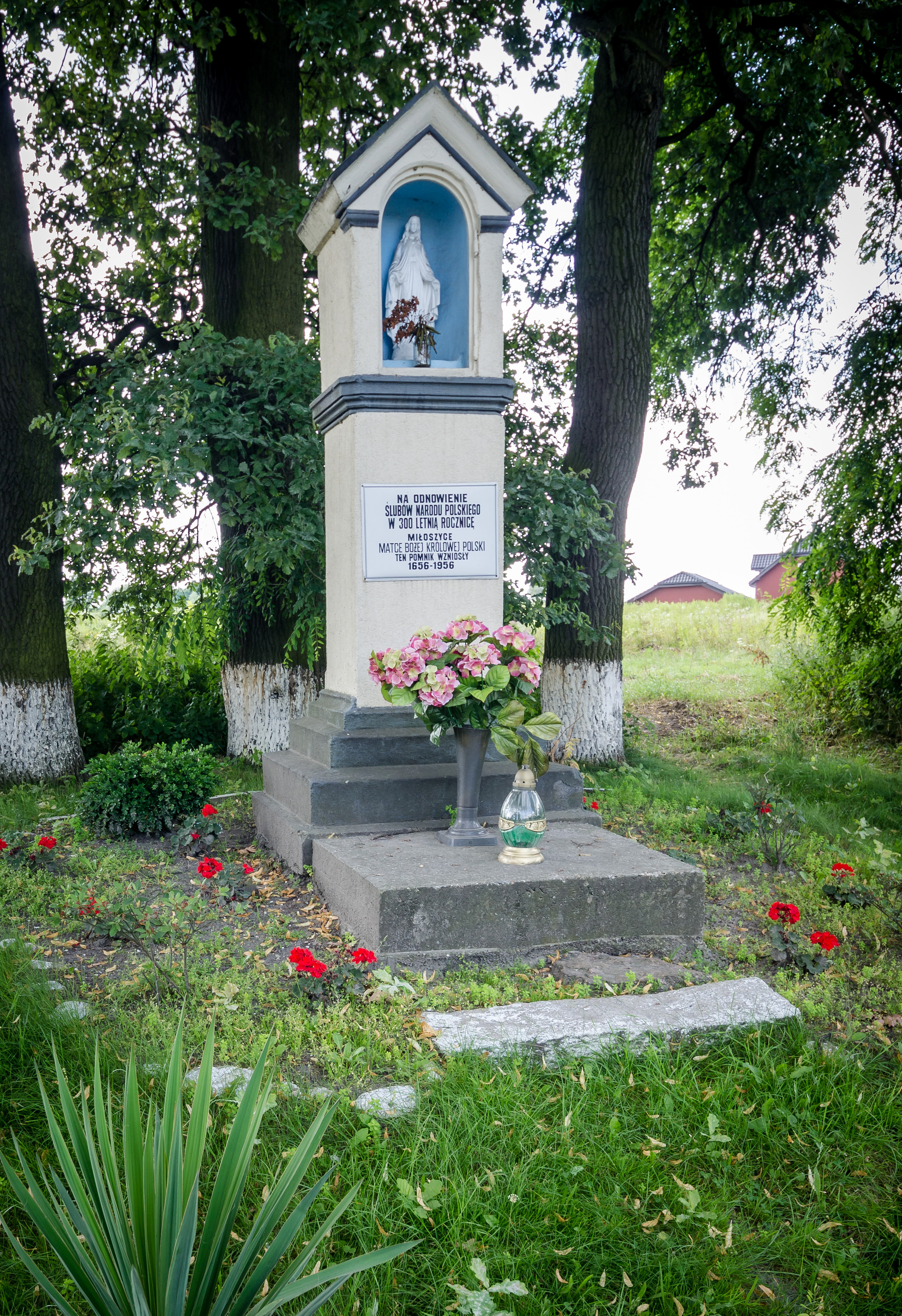
Wayside shrine commemorating the Lwów Oath of 1656

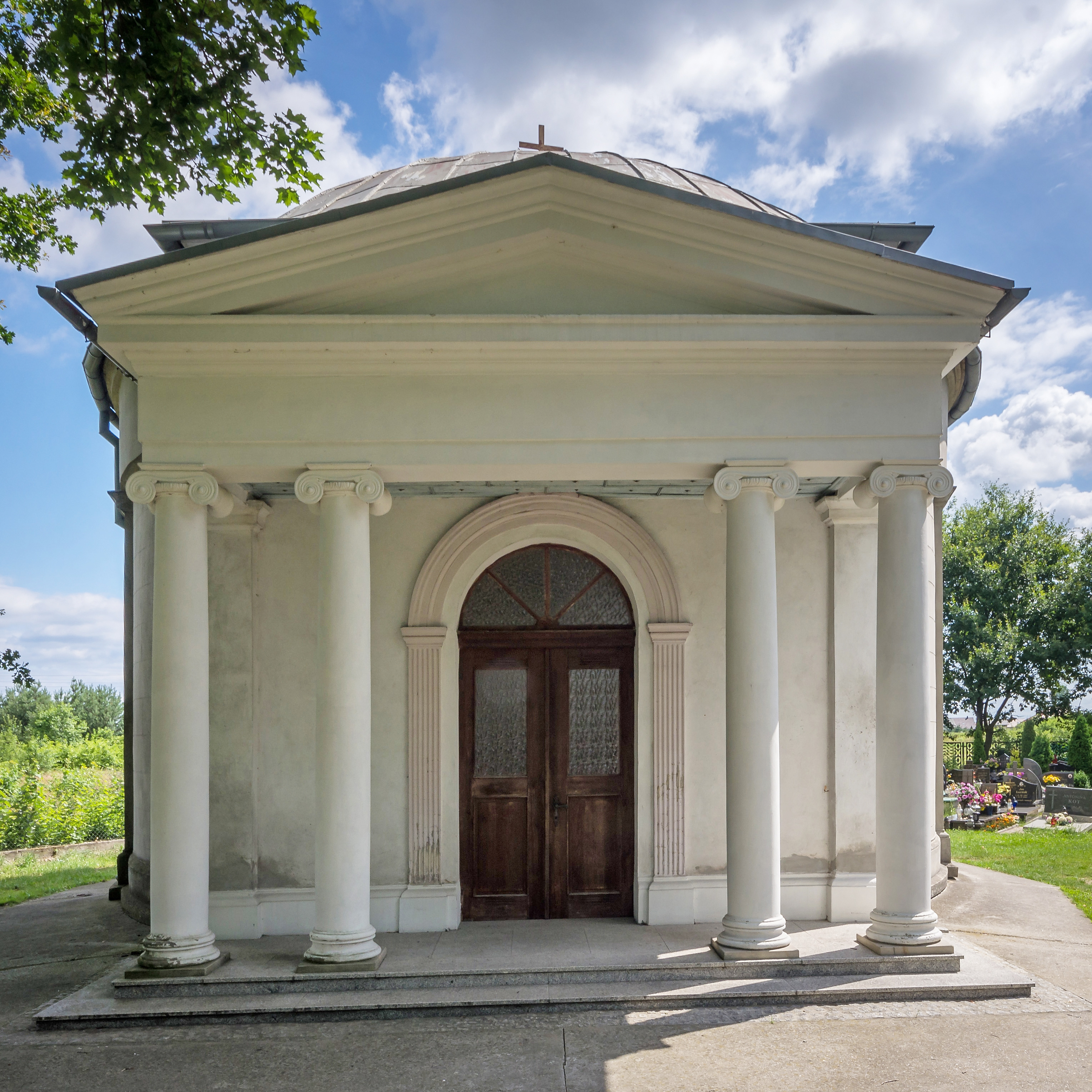
Cemetery chapel

== Notable people ==
- Gerhard Woitzik, German politician
