= Christian Centre =

Christian political party in Germany

Christian Centre Christliche Mitte
- Leader: Josef Happel
- Founded: 27 August 1988
- Split from: Centre Party
- Headquarters: Lippstädter Str. 42; D-59329 Wadersloh
- Ideology: Christian right National conservatism Social conservatism Christian conservatism Anti-Islam; Anti-Esotericism; Euroscepticism; Anti-LGBT
- Political position: Right-wing to far-right

Website
- www.christliche-mitte.de

The Christian Centre — For a Germany according to GOD's commandments (German: Christliche Mitte — Für ein Deutschland nach GOTTES Geboten), abbreviated CM, is a Christian conservative fringe party in Germany. Without parliamentary representation, it is a party that represents strict conservative Christian values. Unlike the more moderate Party of Bible-abiding Christians, the party's core values overlap with those of far-right ideology, emphasising national conservatism, anti-pluralism, anti-LGBT and ethnic collectivism.

== History ==
The CM was founded on 27 August 1988 by Adelgunde Mertensacker after she was voted out of the German Centre Party. Mertensacker remained president of the party until she died on 12 October 2013, after which no new president was selected. During their active time, the party was largely unsuccessful, never receiving a municipal mandate, and never exceeding 0.2% of votes in a European Parliament election. The CM explained their overall low popularity by the "moral decay in Europe" and that their political program was "too sophisticated".

In February 2016, the party announced that it would no longer contest elections but instead would focus on political activism.

== Election results ==
=== Federal Parliament (Bundestag) ===
Election	Constituency		Party list		Seats	+/–	Status
Election	Votes	%	Votes	%	Seats	+/–	Status
1990	36,446 (#14)	0.08	9,824	0.02	0 / 631	New	Extra-parliamentary
1994	19,887 (#16)	0.04	3,559	0.01	0 / 631	New	Extra-parliamentary
1998	23,619 (#22)	0.05	9,023	0.02	0 / 631	New	Extra-parliamentary
2002	15,440 (#17)	0.03	2,413	0.01	0 / 631	New	Extra-parliamentary
2005			1,011	0.00	0 / 631	New	Extra-parliamentary
2009	6,826 (#23)	0.02			0 / 631	New	Extra-parliamentary
