= Kommandogewalt =

"Kommandogewalt" is a German phrase meaning 'right of command'. Traditionally it is used to refer to the broad category prerogatives to command the armed forces and control their peacetime strength and disposition wielded by the German Kaiser from 1871–1918. This power, belonging solely to the Emperor, was acknowledged in Article 63 of the German Constitution of 1871. On the morning of 25 October 1918, Kaiser Wilhelm II signed draft legislation that limited his Kommandogewalt, making it then subject to the Chancellor.
