= Christian People's Party (Germany, 1965) =

German political party

Christian People's Party (German: Christliche Volkspartei, abbreviation CVP) was the name of a political party in the Federal Republic of Germany in 1965. This was not a full-fledged party, but a unique electoral alliance between the Centre Party and the Saarland People's Party (SVP).

The CVP was formed on July 17, 1965, through the alliance of the Centre Party and members of the Saarland Christian People's Party that were opposed to the merger of their party into the Saar CDU in 1959 and formed the SVP instead. The centre (which previously briefly used the name "Christian People's Party" in the 1920s) and the Saarland CVP were united before, also as a "Christian People's Party", from July 1956 to April 1957. The roots of the party limited its appeal primarily to Catholics disenchanted with the (lack of) Christian agenda in CDU.

CVP vision was to become a framework for Christian parties positioned to the left of the CDU that will not restrict the independence of the parties aligned under this umbrella. The (ultimately unsuccessful) plan was to include into CVP also the German Party, the South Schleswig Voters' Association, the Bavaria Party, and the Baden People's Party, some of which had already been involved with Centre through the Federalist Union.

The CVP took part in the 1965 West German federal election, but only in Saarland and North Rhine-Westphalia, due to the relatively small membership and financial support. In Saarland the party got at least 1.4% of the votes, with just 0.1% in North Rhine-Westphalia. Due to this disappointment, the Centre dropped the CVP yet again, but the regional party continued to work under the name Saarland People's Party/Christian People's Party (SVP/CVP).

In June 1965 in Saarland state elections SVP/CVP got two mandates with 5.2% of the vote (30,570 votes), which was more than half as much as the SVP share in 1960 elections. Elections of 1970 saw the vote dropping to 0.8% (5,773 votes). With all seats in the Saar state parliament lost, party activity was stopped in 1970.

== Sources ==
- Winkler, Jürgen R. (2008). "Das Parteiensystem des Saarlandes". Parteien und Parteiensysteme in den deutschen Ländern (in German). Wiesbaden: VS Verlag für Sozialwissenschaften. pp. 369–386. doi:10.1007/978-3-531-90912-7_16. ISBN 978-3-531-15439-8.
- Rütters, Peter (2006). "Landesparlamentarismus — Saarland". Länder-parlamentarismus in Deutschland (in German). Wiesbaden: VS Verlag für Sozialwissenschaften. pp. 359–388. doi:10.1007/978-3-322-80942-1_13. ISBN 978-3-8100-3893-7.
- Thielking, K.O. (1999). "Die Christliche Volkspartei". Zwischen Bibel und Grundgesetz: christliche Kleinparteien in der Bundesrepublik Deutschland. Wissenschaftliche Beiträge aus dem Tectum Verlag (in German). Tectum-Verlag. pp. 45–46. ISBN 978-3-8288-8007-8.
- Nordsieck, W. (2022). Parties and Elections in Germany: Parliamentary Elections and Governments since 1918, State Elections and State Governments, Political Orientation and History of Parties. Books on Demand. ISBN 978-3-7557-9449-3.
