= 1965 West German federal election =

- 19 September 1965

All 496 seats in the Bundestag (Note: As well as the 22 non-voting delegates for West Berlin, elected by the West Berlin Legislature.) 249 seats needed for a majority
- Registered: 38,510,395 ▲2.9%
- Turnout: 33,416,207 (86.8%) ▼0.9 pp

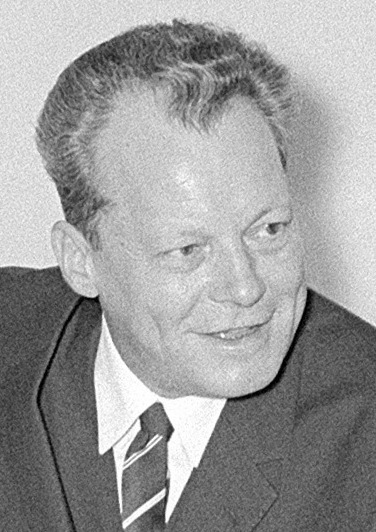

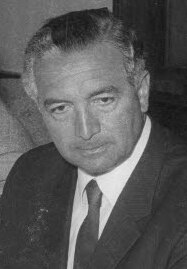
| | First party | Second party | Third party |
|---|---|---|---|
| Candidate | Ludwig Erhard | Willy Brandt | Erich Mende |
| Party | CDU/CSU | SPD | FDP |
| Last election | 45.3%, 242 seats | 36.2%, 190 seats | 12.8%, 67 seats |
| Seats won | 245 (Note: As well as 6 non-voting delegates for West Berlin.) | 202 (Note: As well as 15 non-voting delegates for West Berlin.) | 49 (Note: As well as 1 non-voting delegate for West Berlin.) |
| Seat change | ▲3 | ▲12 | ▼18 |
| Popular vote | 15,524,068 | 12,813,186 | 3,096,739 |
| Percentage | 47.6% | 39.3% | 9.5% |
| Swing | ▲2.3 pp | ▲3.1 pp | ▼3.3 pp |
- The left side shows constituency winners of the election by their party colours. The right side shows party list winners of the election for the additional members by their party colours.
Government before election
First Erhard cabinet
CDU/CSU-FDP
Government after election
Second Erhard cabinet
CDU/CSU-FDP

A federal election was held in West Germany on 19 September 1965 to elect the members of the 5th Bundestag. The CDU/CSU remained the largest faction, while the Social Democratic Party remained the largest single party in the Bundestag, winning 217 of the 518 seats (including 15 of the 22 non-voting delegates for West Berlin).

== Campaign ==
Federal Chancellor Ludwig Erhard was initially popular as the acclaimed "father" of West Germany's economic miracle of the 1950s and early 1960s. West Germany's economy still seemed solid in 1965, and thus not enough West German voters wanted to change the party of Federal Chancellor. To ensure his victory in this Bundestag election, Erhard promised to cut income tax and to increase social program spending.

== Results ==
| Party | Party-list | | | Constituency | | | Seats | | | |
| Party | Votes | % | Seats | Votes | % | Seats | Elected | West Berlin | Total | +/– |
|---|---|---|---|---|---|---|---|---|---|---|
| Social Democratic Party | 12,813,186 | 39.28 | 108 | 12,998,474 | 40.07 | 94 | 202 | 15 | 217 | +14 |
| Christian Democratic Union | 12,387,562 | 37.97 | 78 | 12,631,319 | 38.94 | 118 | 196 | 6 | 202 | +1 |
| Christian Social Union | 3,136,506 | 9.62 | 13 | 3,204,648 | 9.88 | 36 | 49 | 0 | 49 | –1 |
| Free Democratic Party | 3,096,739 | 9.49 | 49 | 2,562,294 | 7.90 | 0 | 49 | 1 | 50 | –17 |
| National Democratic Party | 664,193 | 2.04 | 0 | 587,216 | 1.81 | 0 | 0 | 0 | 0 | 0 |
| German Peace Union | 434,182 | 1.33 | 0 | 386,900 | 1.19 | 0 | 0 | 0 | 0 | 0 |
| Action Group of Independent Germans | 52,637 | 0.16 | 0 | 46,146 | 0.14 | 0 | 0 | 0 | 0 | New |
| Christian People's Party | 19,832 | 0.06 | 0 | 11,978 | 0.04 | 0 | 0 | 0 | 0 | New |
| Free Social Union | 10,631 | 0.03 | 0 | 6,287 | 0.02 | 0 | 0 | 0 | 0 | New |
| Independent Workers' Party | 3,959 | 0.01 | 0 | 1,127 | 0.00 | 0 | 0 | 0 | 0 | New |
| European Federalist Party | 1,015 | 0.00 | 0 | 0 | 0.00 | – | 0 | 0 | 0 | New |
| Independents and voter groups | | | | 660 | 0.00 | 0 | 0 | 0 | 0 | 0 |
| Total | 32,620,442 | 100.00 | 248 | 32,437,049 | 100.00 | 248 | 496 | 22 | 518 | –3 |
| Valid votes | 32,620,442 | 97.62 | | 32,437,049 | 97.07 | | | | | |
| Invalid/blank votes | 795,765 | 2.38 | | 979,158 | 2.93 | | | | | |
| Total votes | 33,416,207 | 100.00 | | 33,416,207 | 100.00 | | | | | |
| Registered voters/turnout | 38,510,395 | 86.77 | | 38,510,395 | 86.77 | | | | | |
Source: Bundeswahlleiter

=== Results by state ===
==== Constituency seats ====
| State | Total seats | Seats won | | |
| State | Total seats | CDU | SPD | CSU |
|---|---|---|---|---|
| Baden-Württemberg | 36 | 30 | 6 | |
| Bavaria | 44 | | 8 | 36 |
| Bremen | 3 | | 3 | |
| Hamburg | 8 | | 8 | |
| Hesse | 22 | 5 | 17 | |
| Lower Saxony | 30 | 20 | 10 | |
| North Rhine-Westphalia | 73 | 38 | 35 | |
| Rhineland-Palatinate | 16 | 11 | 5 | |
| Saarland | 5 | 4 | 1 | |
| Schleswig-Holstein | 11 | 10 | 1 | |
| Total | 248 | 118 | 94 | 36 |

==== List seats ====
| State | Total seats | Seats won | | | |
| State | Total seats | SPD | CDU | FDP | CSU |
|---|---|---|---|---|---|
| Baden-Württemberg | 32 | 17 | 5 | 10 | |
| Bavaria | 42 | 22 | | 7 | 13 |
| Bremen | 2 | | 2 | | |
| Hamburg | 9 | 1 | 7 | 1 | |
| Hesse | 23 | 4 | 13 | 6 | |
| Lower Saxony | 32 | 16 | 9 | 7 | |
| North Rhine-Westphalia | 80 | 31 | 36 | 13 | |
| Rhineland-Palatinate | 15 | 7 | 5 | 3 | |
| Saarland | 3 | 3 | | | |
| Schleswig-Holstein | 10 | 7 | 1 | 2 | |
| Total | 248 | 108 | 78 | 49 | 13 |

== Aftermath ==
The coalition between the CDU/CSU and the FDP returned to government, with Ludwig Erhard as Chancellor. In 1966, the FDP left the coalition over budget issues, and Erhard resigned. Kurt Georg Kiesinger (also CDU) formed a new grand coalition between the CDU/CSU and the SPD which lasted until the next election.
