= Gerhard Woitzik =

German politician (1927–2023)

Gerhard Woitzik (15 November 1927 – 29 January 2023) was a German politician of the Centre Party and was the party leader.

== Early life ==
Woitzik was born in Meleschwitz near Breslau. He was a soldier during World War II. He came to the Rhineland as a Heimatvertriebene. There he graduated from 1947 an administrative apprenticeship. He came to the upper administrative office of the Rhineland in Cologne.

== Political career ==
Woitzik was chairman of the Centre Party, from 1974 to 1986 and from 1996 to 2009, having a basic attitude of Christian social conservativism. Whether he or Alois Degler from 2009 to 2011 was chairman of the party was controversial. On 19 February 2011, the Bundesstelle der Zentrumspartei was newly elected and Woitzik was confirmed as party chairman.

Woitzik had belonged to the municipal council of Nievenheim since the 1950s and was mayor of the municipality until its incorporation into Dormagen in 1975. Afterwards, he was a member of the town council in Dormagen, serving as vice-mayor until 2004. Since 1999 he was also a member of the Kreistag of Rhein-Kreis Neuss.

== Personal life and death ==
His son, Hans-Joachim Woitzik (born 1957), also belongs to the Centre Party, and since 2004 has been the chairman of the party in the town council of Dormagen.

Gerhard Woitzik died on 29 January 2023, at the age of 95.
