= Adolf Gröber =

German politician (1854–1919)

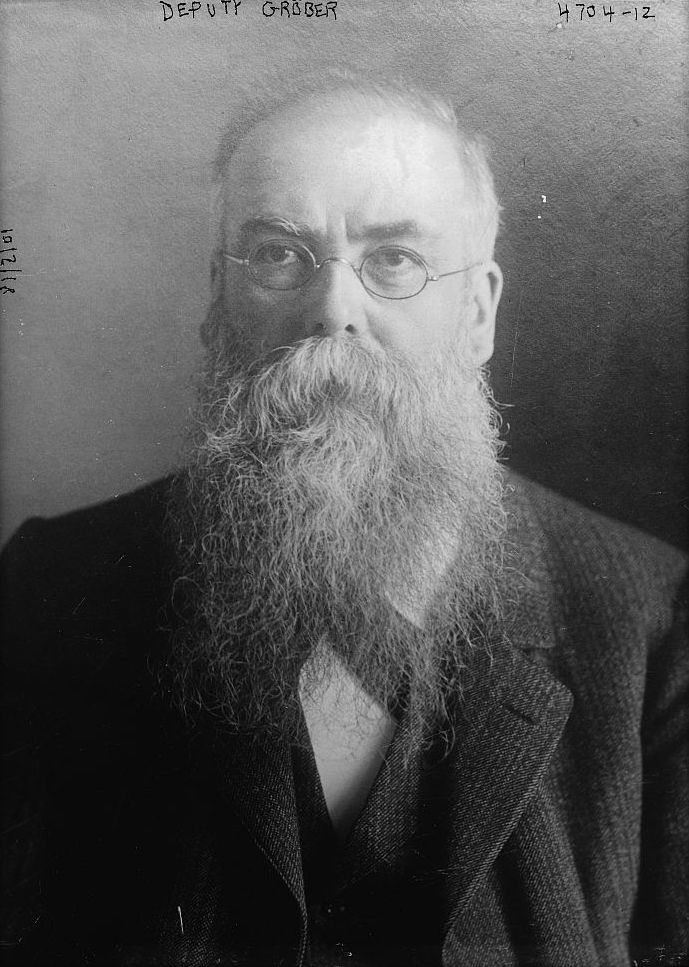
- Adolf Gröber in 1918

Personal details
- Born: February 11, 1854 Riedlingen, Kingdom of Württemberg
- Died: 19 November 1919 (aged 65) Berlin, Weimar Republic
- Party: Zentrum

Adolf Gröber was a German politician and jurist during the German Empire and the Weimar Republic. During that time, he emerged as one of the leading spokesman for the Zentrum party. Loyal to his home kingdom of Württemberg, he was a strong advocate for federalism. During the Chancellorship of Prince Maximilian of Baden he served as a Minister without portfolio.
