= People's Association for Catholic Germany =

People's Association for Catholic Germany Volksverein für das katholische Deutschland
- Founder: Franz Brandts; Franz Hitze
- Founded: 24 October 1890
- Dissolved: 14 July 1933
- Ideology: Social conservatism Anti-liberalism; Anti-socialism; Anti-fascism; Corporativism; Catholic social teaching
- Religion: Roman Catholicism

The People's Association for Catholic Germany (German: Volksverein für das katholische Deutschland) was a German political party founded on 24 October 1890 by Mönchengladbach manufacturer Franz Brandt and Catholic theologian and member of the Reichstag Franz Hitze, with participation by politicians Ludwig Windthorst and Franz Graf von Ballestrem. Its origins lay in Cologne but the founders chose Mönchengladbach as its base. Their aim was to counter the Social Democratic Party by addressing social problems from a Catholic standpoint.

== Historical background ==
After the close of the Bismarck's Kulturkampf, new problems confronted the Catholic population of Germany. Because of the political union of Germany and its protective commercial policy from 1879, German economic life was greatly strengthened. The increase of manufacturing on a large scale, the partial change of many country towns into manufacturing centres, the crowding together of human beings in the manufacturing districts all changes made questions of social needs of increasing importance. The Social Democrats, in anticipation of the overthrow of the laws against Socialism, were making preparations for the establishment of a well-organized association throughout Germany, including among the Catholic population.

Windthorst, the leader of the German Catholics, felt that it was not sufficient for the Centre Party, seen as the main representative of German Catholics, to be the only champion of legislation in favour of working people; the public also must be won over to the support of social reform. The decree of the young Kaiser Wilhelm (February, 1890), the pope's letter to the Archbishop of Cologne (April, 1890), and the pastoral letter of the Prussian bishops issued at their meeting at Fulda contributed to that view. For these reasons Windthorst thought a Catholic social organization should be founded which was to include the whole of Germany. During the deliberations of the committee of organization, Windthorst demanded with all the force of his personal influence an organization that should oppose above all the Social Democrats; moreover, the end to be sought in questions of social economics should be the encouragement and exercise of right principles.

The draft of a constitution, which Windthorst wrote while ill, was adopted at the meeting held on 24 October 1890, for the establishment of the union at the Hotel Ernst in Cologne. Notwithstanding his illness, Windthorst attended this meeting; on the evening of the same day, the name having been agreed upon, the Volksverein for Catholic Germany was founded. From the outset Windthorst had Münchengladbach in view as the chief centre of the organization. The working-men's benefit society, of which Franz Brandt was president and Franz Hitze was general secretary, had existed in that town for ten years. At Windthorst's suggestion Brandts was chosen president, and Karl Trimborn, lawyer, of Cologne, vice-president. Dr. Joseph Drammer, of Cologne, was made secretary. Windthorst himself accepted the honorary presidency offered him, and up to his death in 1891, he followed with great interest all that concerned the new society.

On 22 November 1890, the committee issued the first appeal "To the Catholic People", which set forth the aims of the society and invited to membership. On 20 December, he second appeal was issued, which called upon all supporters of the Catholic cause to work for the increase of the membership. A like appeal was sent in a circular letter to a large number of prominent Catholics of the German empire. The German bishops were also requested to give their blessing and their influential aid to the union, agreed to by most readily. A number of bishops officially called upon their diocesans to join the union. On 23 December, the pope sent an Apostolic blessing in a letter to the managing committee of the union. On 14 February 1891, the union held it first public mass meeting at cologne; at this session Archbishop Philipp Krementz of Cologne made the closing address. Other assemblies were held in other sections of the country. Thus, Windthorst could be told shortly before his death that the society had secured its first 100,000 members. In the early years the eastern provinces of Prussia and Baden and Bavaria stood somewhat aloof from the movement. In 1891, it had 190,899 members. In 1901, it had 185,364. In 1911, it had 700,727. On 1 April 1912, it had 729,800.

== Organisation and work ==
According to paragraph 1 of its by-laws the object of the Volksverein was the opposition of heresy and revolutionary tendencies in the social-economic world as well as the defence of the Christian order in society. That was to be attained by the personal work of the members, by lectures and by the circulation of printed matter. Every grown German Catholic who paid one mark annually to the society was a member of the union and entitled to a vote. The Union was governed by a board of directors of at least seven members, who were elected for one year by the general assembly; the president and vice-president were also, according to the by-laws, elected by the general assembly; the president and vice-president were also, according to the by-laws, elected by the general assembly. The most important questions of the day were addressed in the Sozialkorrespondenz, which was sent, without charge, every Saturday to about 300 Catholic newspapers. The periodical "Der Volksverein" appeared eight times annually. The central bureau issued fly-sheets and appeals on suitable occasions; they were circulated throughout Germany to the number of many millions.

== Weimar Republic ==
After the German Revolution of 1918, the Volksverein took another upturn during the struggle against the anti-clerical rulings of SPD minister Adolph Hoffmann. Subsequently, the influence it had wielded during German Empire declined, only to gain strength again during the crisis years of the Weimar Republic. Many of its leaders, like longtime Employment Minister Dr. Heinrich Brauns, also operated for the Centre Party. The Centre Party and other regional Catholic unions drained members away from the Volksverein. Financial problems during the period of hyperinflation and mismanagement also contributed. Still, the organisation continued to fight against radicalism, such as National Socialism.

== Demise and legacy ==
In 1933, its activities were banned by the Nazi government. At the time, it had 6,000 local associations in Germany. The organisation's voluminous library was saved and donated to the city library of Mönchengladbach. The Volksverein's ideas survived, and after the fall of Nazism, it led the way to a refounding of the organisation under the name Volksverein Mönchengladbach, which still survives.
