= Politics of North Rhine-Westphalia =

Overview of the politics of the German state of North Rhine-Westphalia

The politics of North Rhine-Westphalia takes place within a framework of a federal parliamentary representative democratic republic. The two main parties are the Centre-right Christian Democratic Union and the Centre-left Social Democratic Party of Germany (SPD).

North Rhine-Westphalia uses mixed member proportional representation in the Landtag of North Rhine-Westphalia. Every five years the citizens of North Rhine-Westphalia secretly vote in a general election to elect least 181 members of the Landtag. First-past-the-post voting determines 128 of the minimum 181 members of the Landtag. The remaining seats available to each party is determine by the party-list proportional representation. only parties who win at least 5% of the votes cast may be represented in parliament.

== History of politics in North Rhine-Westphalia ==
From 1966 to 2005, North Rhine-Westphalia was continuously governed by the Social Democrats or SPD-led governments. The 2005 state election granted the CDU an unexpected victory. Their top candidate Jürgen Rüttgers formed a coalition government with the FDP. With the result of the 2010 state elections, this government lost its majority in parliament. After many coalition talks, SPD and the Greens have agreed on a minority government.

== Landtag of North Rhine-Westphalia ==
=== Legislation ===
The task of legislating is split between the Landtag and the Bundestag. The Bundestag is responsible for all matters which directly affect Germany as a whole. States can only participate in this area through the Bundesrat. The Landtag of North Rhine-Westphalia is responsible for cultural matters, the education system, matters of internal security, i.e. the police, building supervision, health supervision and the media within North Rhine-Westphalia. The Landtag may enact laws as long as the Bundestag does not make use of its right to legislate.

The Landtag of North Rhine-Westphalia, the parliamentary parties and groups consisting of at least 7 members of parliament have the right to table legal proposals to the Landtag for deliberation. In consultation with the Ältestenrat, the President of the Landtag places the draft bill on the plenary session's agenda. Firstly, the minister responsible, or one of the members who is filing the bill, introduces it to the plenary session and justifies the reasons for introducing it. During this First Reading, if the bill is politically sensitive, there is usually a fundamental debate about the law. Normally, the debate ends with the draft bill being referred to the overall control of the appropriate expert committee and, if necessary, being referred to other committees as well, which may also become involved in the advisory process.

This is when the detailed work begins for the experts in the individual parliamentary parties. External expert witnesses are often brought in to evaluate the legal proposals. They provide statements during what are known as "hearings" and make their contribution to the process of arriving at a decision which is right and proper. Preparations for the expert committees also take place in the parliamentary party working groups. The weekly parliamentary party meetings are a forum for exchanging information between committee members and other Members of Parliament.

The draft bill is examined down to the last detail in a small group, before appearing for a second time on the agenda of the plenary session, when it is debated afresh on the basis of the committee report. Every Member of Parliament now has another opportunity to table amendments. In this Second Reading, once members have decided which tabled amendments to accept, it is usual for the final vote concerning the law to take place.

Constitutional changes and budgetary laws are debated in three Readings. For other proposed legislation, a parliamentary party or a quarter of all members of parliament can apply for there to be a Third Reading and, if necessary, further committee consultations.

The law passed by the Landtag is delivered to the Minister-President, who, together with the ministers involved, is required to sign it and announce it in the Law and Ordinance Gazette. When the law comes into force is normally determined by the legislation itself, most usually the day after its announcement.

=== Election results ===
Since the establishment of the Federal Republic of Germany, the election results in the state have been:

State election results from 1947 to 2022
Year	SPD	CDU	FDP	Grüne	AfD	Other	Government
1947	32.0%	37.6%	6.0%			KPD 14.0% Zentrum 9.8% Other 0.8%	CDU–SPD–KPD–Z
1950	32.3%	36.9%	12.1%			Zentrum 7.5% KPD 5.5% Other 5.7%	CDU–Z
1954	34.5%	41.3%	11.5%			Zentrum 4.0% Other 8.7%	CDU–FDP–Z
1954	34.5%	41.3%	11.5%			Zentrum 4.0% Other 8.7%	SPD–FDP–Z
1958	39.2%	50.5%	7.1%			3.2%	CDU
1962	43.3%	46.4%	6.9%			3.4%	CDU–FDP
1966	49.5%	42.8%	7.4%			0.3%	SPD–FDP
1970	46.1%	46.3%	5.5%			2.1%	SPD–FDP
1975	45.1%	47.1%	6.7%			1.1%	SPD–FDP
1980	48.4%	43.2%	4.98%	3.0%		0.4%	SPD
1985	52.1%	36.5%	6.0%	4.6%		0.8%	SPD
1990	50.0%	36.7%	5.8%	5.05%		2.5%	SPD
1995	46.0%	37.7%	4.0%	10.0%		2.3%	SPD–Grüne
2000	42.8%	37.0%	9.8%	7.1%		3.3%	SPD–Grüne
2005	37.1%	44.8%	6.2%	6.2%		3.5%	CDU–FDP
2010	34.5%	34.6%	6.7%	12.1%		Linke 5.6% Other 5.5%	SPD–Grüne (minority)
2012	39.1%	26.3%	8.6%	11.3%		Pirates 7.8% Other 6.9%	SPD–Grüne
2017	31.2%	33.0%	12.6%	6.4%	7.4%	9.4%	CDU–FDP
2022	26.7%	35.7%	5.9%	18.2%	5.4%	8.2%	CDU–Grüne

=== Party strength in the Landtag ===
Election year	Total seats	Seats won						
Election year	Total seats	CDU	SPD	FDP	DZP	Grüne	AfD	Other
1947	216	92	64	12	20			28 (Note: KPD)
1950	215	93	68	26	16			12 (Note: KPD)
1954	200	90	76	25	9			
1958	200	104	81	15				
1962	200	96	90	14				
1966	200	86	99	15				
1970	200	95	94	11				
1975	200	95	91	14				
1980	201	95	106					
1985	227	88	125	14				
1990	237	89	122	14		12		
1995	231	89	108			24		
2000	231	88	102	24		17		
2005	187	89	74	12		12		
2010	181	67	67	13		23		11 (Note: Left)
2012	237	67	99	22		29		20 (Note: Pirates)
2017	199	72	69	28		14	16	
2022	195	76	56	12		39	12	

=== Legislative compositions ===
1st Landtag, following 1947 election

2nd Landtag, following 1950 election

3rd Landtag, following 1954 election

4th Landtag, following 1958 election

5th Landtag, following 1962 election

6th Landtag, following 1966 election

7th Landtag, following 1970 election

8th Landtag, following 1975 election

9th Landtag, following 1980 election

10th Landtag, following 1985 election

11th Landtag, following 1990 election

12th Landtag, following 1995 election

13th Landtag, following 2000 election

14th Landtag, following 2005 election

15th Landtag, following 2010 election

16th Landtag, following 2012 election

17th Landtag, following 2017 election

18th Landtag, following 2022 election

=== State election results maps ===
1947 North Rhine-Westphalia state election

1950 North Rhine-Westphalia state election

1954 North Rhine-Westphalia state election

1958 North Rhine-Westphalia state election

1962 North Rhine-Westphalia state election

1966 North Rhine-Westphalia state election

1970 North Rhine-Westphalia state election

1975 North Rhine-Westphalia state election

1980 North Rhine-Westphalia state election

1985 North Rhine-Westphalia state election

1990 North Rhine-Westphalia state election

1995 North Rhine-Westphalia state election

2000 North Rhine-Westphalia state election

2005 North Rhine-Westphalia state election

2010 North Rhine-Westphalia state election

2012 North Rhine-Westphalia state election

2017 North Rhine-Westphalia state election

2022 North Rhine-Westphalia state election

=== Constituencies in the Landtag ===
Cologne Administrative District

- Aachen I (01)
- Aachen II (02)
- Aachen III (03)
- Aachen IV (04)
- Rhein-Erft-Kreis I (05)
- Rhein-Erft-Kreis II (06)
- Rhein-Erft-Kreis III (07)
- Euskirchen I (08)
- Heinsberg I (09)
- Heinsberg II (10)
- Düren I (11)
- Düren II – Euskirchen II (12)
- Cologne I (13)
- Cologne II (14)
- Cologne III (15)
- Cologne IV (16)
- Cologne V (17)
- Cologne VI (18)
- Cologne VII (19)
- Leverkusen (20)
- Rheinisch-Bergischer Kreis I (21)
- Rheinisch-Bergischer Kreis II (22)
- Oberbergischer Kreis I (23)
- Oberbergischer Kreis II (24)
- Rhein-Sieg-Kreis I (25)
- Rhein-Sieg-Kreis II (26)
- Rhein-Sieg-Kreis III – Euskirchen III (27)
- Rhein-Sieg-Kreis IV (28)
- Rhein-Sieg-Kreis V (29)
- Bonn I (30)
- Bonn II (31)

Düsseldorf Administrative District

- Wuppertal I (32)
- Wuppertal II (33)
- Wuppertal III – Solingen II (34)
- Solingen I (35)
- Remscheid – Oberbergischer Kreis III (36)
- Mettmann I (37)
- Mettmann II (38)
- Mettmann III – Mülheim II (39)
- Mettmann IV (40)
- Düsseldorf I (41)
- Düsseldorf II (42)
- Düsseldorf III (43)
- Düsseldorf IV (44)
- Rhein-Kreis Neuss I (45)
- Rhein-Kreis Neuss II (46)
- Rhein-Kreis Neuss III (47)
- Krefeld I – Viersen III (48)
- Krefeld II (49)
- Mönchengladbach I (50)
- Mönchengladbach II (51)
- Viersen I (52)
- Viersen II (53)
- Kleve I (54)
- Kleve II (55)
- Oberhausen I (56)
- Oberhausen II – Wesel I (57)
- Wesel II (58)
- Wesel III (59)
- Wesel IV (60)
- Duisburg I (61)
- Duisburg II (62)
- Duisburg III (63)
- Mülheim I (64)
- Essen I (65)
- Essen II (66)
- Essen III (67)
- Essen IV (68)

Münster Administrative District

- Recklinghausen I (69)
- Recklinghausen II (70)
- Recklinghausen III (71)
- Recklinghausen IV (72)
- Gelsenkirchen I – Recklinghausen V (73)
- Gelsenkirchen II (74)
- Bottrop – Recklinghausen VI (75)
- Borken I (76)
- Borken II (77)
- Coesfeld I – Borken III (78)
- Coesfeld II (79)
- Steinfurt I (80)
- Steinfurt II (81)
- Steinfurt III (82)
- Münster I – Steinfurt IV (83)
- Münster II (84)
- Münster III – Coesfeld III (85)
- Warendorf I (86)
- Warendorf II (87)

Detmold Administrative District

- Minden-Lübbecke I (88)
- Minden-Lübbecke II (89)
- Herford I (90)
- Herford II – Minden-Lübbecke III (91)
- Bielefeld I (92)
- Bielefeld II (93)
- Gütersloh I – Bielefeld III (94)
- Gütersloh II (95)
- Gütersloh III (96)
- Lippe I (97)
- Lippe II – Herford III (98)
- Lippe III (99)
- Paderborn I (100)
- Paderborn II (101)
- Höxter (102)

Arnsberg Administrative District

- Hagen I (103)
- Hagen II – Ennepe-Ruhr-Kreis III (104)
- Ennepe-Ruhr-Kreis I (105)
- Ennepe-Ruhr-Kreis II (106)
- Bochum I (107)
- Bochum II (108)
- Bochum III (109)
- Herne (110)
- Dortmund I (111)
- Dortmund II (112)
- Dortmund III (113)
- Dortmund IV (114)
- Unna I (115)
- Unna II (116)
- Unna III – Hamm II (117)
- Hamm I (118)
- Soest I (119)
- Soest II (120)
- Märkischer Kreis I (121)
- Märkischer Kreis II (122)
- Märkischer Kreis III (123)
- Hochsauerlandkreis I (124)
- Hochsauerlandkreis II (125)
- Siegen-Wittgenstein I (126)
- Siegen-Wittgenstein II (127)
- Olpe (128)

== Constituencies in the Bundestag ==
No	Constituency	Member	2021	Voters	2017	2013	2009	2005	2002	1998	1994	1990
86	Aachen I	Oliver Krischer	Grüne	176,306	CDU	CDU	CDU	SPD	SPD	SPD	CDU	CDU
87	Aachen II	Claudia Moll	SPD	226,420	SPD	CDU	CDU	SPD	SPD	SPD	SPD	SPD
88	Heinsberg	Wilfried Oellers	CDU	192,346	CDU	CDU	CDU	CDU	CDU	CDU	CDU	CDU
89	Düren	Thomas Rachel	CDU	199,656	CDU	CDU	CDU	CDU	SPD	SPD	CDU	CDU
90	Rhein-Erft-Kreis I	Georg Kippels	CDU	249,035	CDU	CDU	CDU	SPD	SPD	SPD	SPD	SPD
91	Euskirchen – Rhein-Erft-Kreis II	Detlef Seif	CDU	249,198	CDU	CDU	CDU	CDU	CDU	CDU	CDU	CDU
92	Cologne I	Sanae Abdi	SPD	190,630	CDU	SPD	SPD	SPD	SPD	SPD	SPD	SPD
93	Cologne II	Sven Lehmann	Grüne	242,483	CDU	CDU	CDU	SPD	SPD	SPD	CDU	CDU
94	Cologne III	Rolf Mützenich	SPD	204,539	SPD	SPD	SPD	SPD	SPD	SPD	SPD	SPD
95	Bonn	Katrin Uhlig	Grüne	230,215	SPD	SPD	SPD	SPD	SPD	CDU	CDU	CDU
96	Rhein-Sieg-Kreis I	Elisabeth Winkelmeier-Becker	CDU	238,627	CDU	CDU	CDU	CDU	SPD	SPD	CDU	CDU
97	Rhein-Sieg-Kreis II	Norbert Röttgen	CDU	216,063	CDU	CDU	CDU	CDU	CDU	CDU	CDU	CDU
98	Oberbergischer Kreis	Carsten Brodesser	CDU	206,640	CDU	CDU	CDU	CDU	CDU	SPD	CDU	CDU
99	Rheinisch-Bergischer Kreis	Hermann-Josef Tebroke	CDU	217,193	CDU	CDU	CDU	CDU	CDU	CDU	CDU	CDU
100	Leverkusen – Cologne IV	Erwin Rüddel	SPD	209,102	SPD	SPD	SPD	SPD	SPD	Created for 2002 election		
101	Wuppertal I	Helge Lindh	SPD	202,528	SPD	SPD	SPD	SPD	SPD	SPD	SPD	SPD
102	Solingen – Remscheid – Wuppertal II	Ingo Schäfer	SPD	220,204	CDU	CDU	CDU	SPD	SPD	SPD	SPD	CDU
103	Mettmann I	Klaus Wiener	CDU	203,030	CDU	CDU	CDU	CDU	SPD	SPD	CDU	CDU
104	Mettmann II	Peter Beyer	CDU	160,175	CDU	CDU	CDU	SPD	SPD	SPD	CDU	CDU
105	Düsseldorf I	Thomas Jarzombek	CDU	220,827	CDU	CDU	CDU	CDU	SPD	SPD	CDU	CDU
106	Düsseldorf II	Andreas Rimkus	SPD	190,102	CDU	CDU	CDU	SPD	SPD	SPD	SPD	SPD
107	Neuss I	Hermann Gröhe	CDU	213,250	CDU	CDU	CDU	CDU	SPD	CDU	CDU	CDU
108	Mönchengladbach	Günter Krings	CDU	185,185	CDU	CDU	CDU	CDU	CDU	SPD	CDU	CDU
109	Krefeld I – Neuss II	Ansgar Heveling	CDU	200,048	CDU	CDU	CDU	CDU	CDU	Created for 2002 election		
110	Viersen	Martin Plum	CDU	227,166	CDU	CDU	CDU	CDU	CDU	CDU	CDU	CDU
111	Kleve	Erwin Rüddel	CDU	224,463	CDU	CDU	CDU	CDU	CDU	CDU	CDU	CDU
112	Wesel I	Daniel Rinkert	SPD	206,270	CDU	CDU	CDU	SPD	SPD	SPD	SPD	SPD
113	Krefeld II – Wesel II	Jan Dieren	SPD	175,852	CDU	SPD	SPD	SPD	SPD	Created for 2002 election		
114	Duisburg I	Bärbel Bas	SPD	163,394	SPD	SPD	SPD	SPD	SPD	SPD	SPD	SPD
115	Duisburg II	Mahmut Özdemir	SPD	155,265	SPD	SPD	SPD	SPD	SPD	SPD	SPD	SPD
116	Oberhausen – Wesel III	Dirk Vöpel	SPD	199,156	SPD	SPD	SPD	SPD	SPD	SPD	SPD	SPD
117	Mülheim – Essen I	Sebastian Fiedler	SPD	182,895	SPD	SPD	SPD	SPD	SPD	SPD	SPD	SPD
118	Essen II	Dirk Heidenblut	SPD	156,298	SPD	SPD	SPD	SPD	SPD	SPD	SPD	SPD
119	Essen III	Matthias Hauer	CDU	190,335	CDU	CDU	SPD	SPD	SPD	SPD	SPD	SPD
120	Recklinghausen I	Frank Schwabe	SPD	165,193	SPD	SPD	SPD	SPD	SPD	SPD	SPD	SPD
121	Recklinghausen II	Erwin Rüddel	SPD	186,413	SPD	SPD	SPD	SPD	SPD	SPD	SPD	SPD
122	Gelsenkirchen	Markus Töns	SPD	168,496	SPD	SPD	SPD	SPD	SPD	SPD	SPD	SPD
123	Steinfurt I – Borken I	Jens Spahn	CDU	202,388	CDU	CDU	CDU	CDU	CDU	Created for 2002 election		
124	Bottrop – Recklinghausen III	Michael Gerdes	SPD	199,344	SPD	SPD	SPD	SPD	SPD	SPD	SPD	SPD
125	Borken II	Anne König	CDU	201,102	CDU	CDU	CDU	CDU	CDU	CDU	CDU	CDU
126	Neuwied	Marc Henrichmann	CDU	194,695	CDU	CDU	CDU	CDU	CDU	CDU	CDU	CDU
127	Steinfurt III	Anja Karliczek	CDU	195,513	CDU	CDU	CDU	SPD	SPD	SPD	SPD	CDU
128	Münster	Maria Klein-Schmeink	Grüne	233,953	CDU	CDU	CDU	SPD	SPD	CDU	CDU	CDU
129	Warendorf	Henning Rehbaum	CDU	208,754	CDU	CDU	CDU	CDU	CDU	CDU	CDU	CDU
130	Gütersloh I	Ralph Brinkhaus	CDU	234,177	CDU	CDU	CDU	CDU	CDU	CDU	CDU	CDU
131	Bielefeld – Gütersloh II	Wiebke Esdar	SPD	243,059	SPD	SPD	CDU	SPD	SPD	SPD	SPD	SPD
132	Herford – Minden-Lübbecke II	Stefan Schwartze	SPD	226,894	SPD	SPD	SPD	SPD	SPD	SPD	SPD	SPD
133	Minden-Lübbecke I	Achim Post	SPD	201,888	SPD	CDU	CDU	SPD	SPD	SPD	SPD	SPD
134	Lippe I	Jürgen Berghahn	SPD	224,415	CDU	SPD	SPD	SPD	SPD	SPD	SPD	SPD
135	Höxter – Gütersloh III – Lippe II	Christian Haase	CDU	172,435	CDU	CDU	CDU	CDU	CDU	CDU	CDU	CDU
136	Paderborn	Carsten Linnemann	CDU	231,534	CDU	CDU	CDU	CDU	CDU	CDU	CDU	CDU
137	Hagen – Ennepe-Ruhr-Kreis I	Timo Schisanowski	SPD	201,594	SPD	SPD	SPD	SPD	SPD	SPD	SPD	SPD
138	Neuwied	Axel Echeverria	SPD	175,283	SPD	SPD	SPD	SPD	SPD	SPD	SPD	SPD
139	Bochum I	Axel Schäfer	SPD	202,393	SPD	SPD	SPD	SPD	SPD	SPD	SPD	SPD
140	Herne – Bochum II	Michelle Müntefering	SPD	173,939	SPD	SPD	SPD	SPD	SPD	SPD	SPD	SPD
141	Dortmund I	Jens Peick	SPD	206,727	SPD	SPD	SPD	SPD	SPD	SPD	SPD	SPD
142	Dortmund II	Sabine Poschmann	SPD	199,317	SPD	SPD	SPD	SPD	SPD	SPD	SPD	SPD
143	Unna I	Oliver Kaczmarek	SPD	194,493	SPD	SPD	SPD	SPD	SPD	SPD	SPD	SPD
144	Hamm – Unna II	Michael Thews	SPD	231,226	SPD	SPD	SPD	SPD	SPD	SPD	SPD	SPD
145	Soest	Hans-Jürgen Thies	CDU	231,811	CDU	CDU	CDU	CDU	CDU	SPD	CDU	CDU
146	Hochsauerlandkreis	Friedrich Merz	CDU	200,496	CDU	CDU	CDU	CDU	CDU	CDU	CDU	CDU
147	Siegen-Wittgenstein	Volkmar Klein	CDU	207,672	CDU	CDU	CDU	SPD	SPD	SPD	CDU	CDU
148	Olpe – Märkischer Kreis I	Florian Müller	CDU	203,350	CDU	CDU	CDU	CDU	CDU	CDU	CDU	CDU
149	Märkischer Kreis II	Paul Ziemiak	CDU	195,816	SPD	SPD	SPD	SPD	SPD	SPD	SPD	SPD

== See also ==
- Politics of Germany
- Landtag of North Rhine-Westphalia
