= Independent Workers' Party (German Socialists) =

Independent Workers' Party (German Socialists) Unabhängige Arbeiter-Partei (Deutsche Sozialisten)
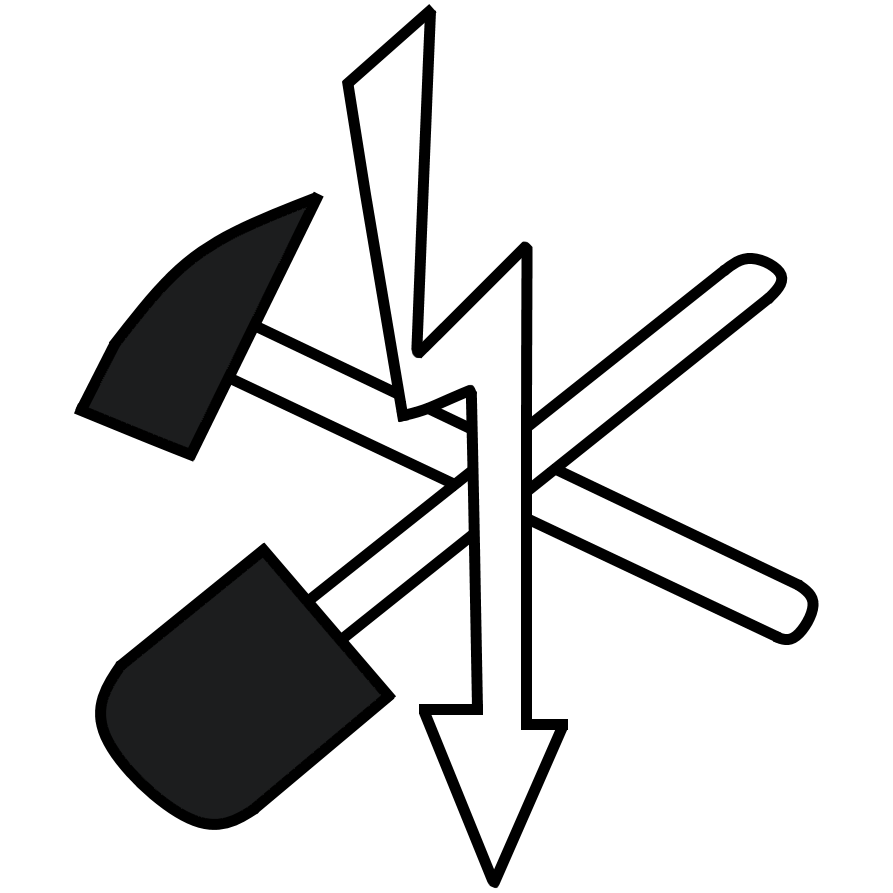
- Leader: Ulrich Villmow (1995-2014)
- Founded: 21 January 1962; 64 years ago
- Dissolved: 1 November 2014; 11 years ago
- Split from: German Social Union
- Headquarters: Essen
- Newspaper: Reichs-Arbeiter-Zeitung
- Youth wing: Blaue Adler-Jugend
- Membership (2005): ca. 100
- Ideology: Strasserism; Neue Rechte; European federalism Guild socialism Revolutionary nationalism
- Political position: Far-right
- Colours: Cyan

Website
- www.uap-online.de (archived)

The Independent Workers' Party (German Socialists) (German: Unabhängige Arbeiter-Partei (Deutsche Sozialisten)), short-form: UAP, was a minor Strasserist political party in Germany. The UAP split from the German Social Union (DSU) of Otto Strasser in 1962 under the district leader of the Arnsberg section of the DSU, Erhard Kliese. The party existed until 2014. It is considered the successor to the DSU.

== History ==
The UAP started as the "Socialist Workers-Centralist-Faction" under Erhard Kliese, district leader of the Arnsberg section, within the German Social Union (DSU). This faction would later split from the DSU over disagreements about a proposed cooperation between the DSU and the German Freedom Party (DFP) since an alleged letter from Otto Strasser was said to have been discovered in which Strasser promised to give up Strasserism ("German Socialism") in order for the merger to take place. The Socialist Workers-Centralist-Faction around Kliese strongly disavowed this move, naming the remaining DSU "bourgeoisie workers' enemies" (bürgerliche Arbeiterfeinde) and splitting off from the party after an unsuccessful internal DSU election.

The UAP would officially be founded on 21 January 1962 by Erhard Kliese, Horst Bosbach, and Wolfgang Hülsmann. It planned to focus first and foremost on the workers, especially hoping to attract those who were disappointed with the SPD.

Until 1967, the UAP had only existed in North Rhine-Westphalia, its home state. From September onwards however, several new state sections would be founded in Bavaria, Hesse, Lower Saxony, Baden-Württemberg, and Rhineland-Palatinate. During the year 1971, the UAP counted a membership of around 400 in all of the aforementioned state sections. As of 1999, only the North Rhine-Westphalian, Hessian, and Bavarian sections remained.

After 1967, the UAP started opening itself up to the new right.

=== Membership development ===
The highest confirmed membership count of the UAP was during 1970, where it had 600 members.

Year	Members
1963	60
1964	400
1970	600
1971	400
1999	120
2005	100

== Ideology ==
The UAP viewed itself as a nationalist and socialist workers' party and based its program primarily on the brothers Otto and Gregor Strasser. It saw itself as the only German party to stand in the tradition of Ferdinand Lassalle and Kurt Schumacher who it claimed were national revolutionaries.

=== Action program ===
The UAP proclaimed its ten most important points in a 1962 'Action program'. Directly translated, these points are as follows:

1. A new form of economic organisation!
2. Collectivization of all large private and state-owned business!
3. Management of firms in the hands of the workers!
4. Equal distribution of dividends!
5. A unionized form of management!
6. Simpler trade between intermediaries!
7. Introduction of an index currency by a...
8. Bank without interest gain!
9. Creation of a central insurance equalization bank...
10. For all socialized large companies and small private entrepreneurs!

== Youth wing ==
The UAP's youth wing was the Blue Eagle-Youth (German: Blaue Adler-Jugend), abbreviation: BAJ, founded on 10 December 1967 in Hattingen. While officially an independent organisation, it acted as the de facto youth wing of the party. The Blue Eagle-Youth claimed a membership of 2,400 in 1971, independent observers however estimated the membership of the organisation to consistently be below 100 and up to as low as 20. The BAJ issued its own newspaper named "barricade" around the 1970s.

=== Leaders of the BAJ ===
- Hans Peter Schreiner (1969-1971)
- Wolfgang Strauss (1971-1973)
- Ulrich Villmow (?-2014)

== Elections ==
=== Federal elections ===
The UAP participated in six federal election from its founding in 1962 until its dissolution in 2014. The party achieved its highest ever election result in the 1969 West German federal election with 5.309 votes or 0.005% in all of Germany, or 0.055% in just North Rhine-Westphalia.

Year	Constituency		Party list	
Year	Votes	%	Votes	%
1965	1,127	0.012	3,959	0,003
1969	1,531	0.016	5,309	0,005
1976	499	0.002	765	0.001
1980	159	0.0004		
1987	352	0.0009		
1994	302	0.0006		

=== State elections ===
The UAP only ever participated in North Rhine-Westphalian state elections. It achieved its highest result in the 1966 election, with 3,175 votes or 0.04%.

Year	NW	
Year	Votes	%
1962	426	0.01
1966	3,175	0.04
1970	1,504	0.02
1975	648	0.01
1980	180	0.00
1985	did not contest	
1990	did not contest	
1995	152	0.00
2000	139	0.00
2005	523	0.01
2010	108	0.00
