= 1962 North Rhine-Westphalia state election =

German state election

← 1958	8 July 1962	1966 →

All 200 seats in the Landtag of North Rhine-Westphalia 101 seats needed for a majority
- Turnout: 8,188,988 (73.4% ▼3.2 pp)
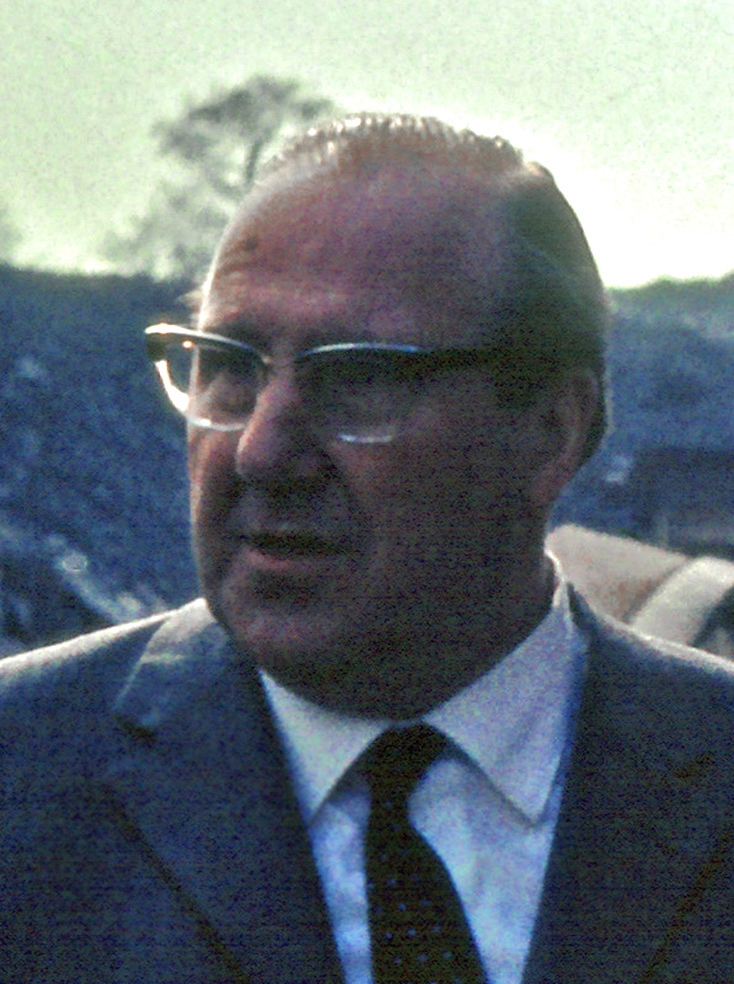

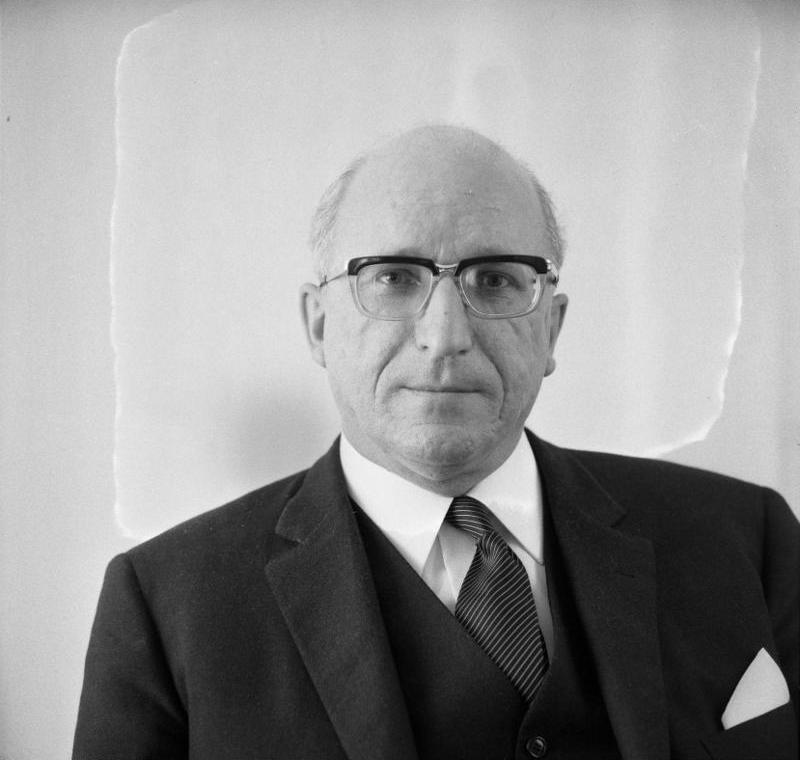

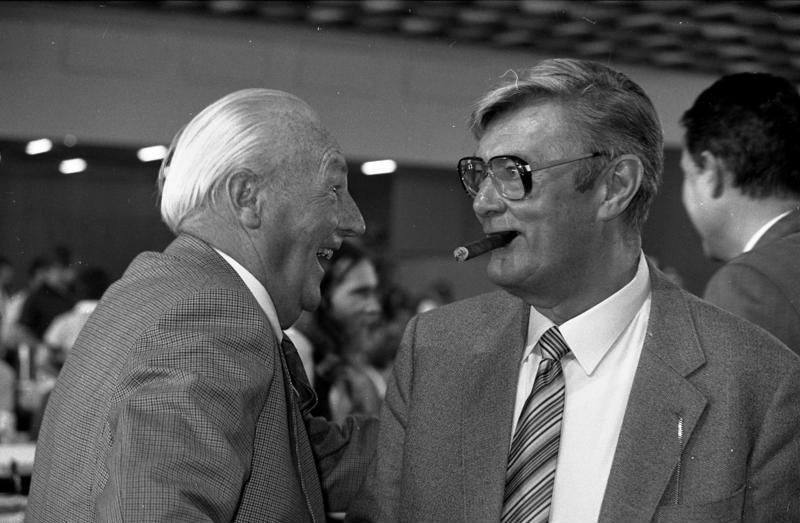
	First party	Second party	Third party
Candidate	Franz Meyers	Heinz Kühn	Willi Weyer
Party	CDU	SPD	FDP
Last election	104 seats, 50.5%	81 seats, 39.2%	15 seats, 7.1%
Seats won	96	90	14
Seat change	▼8	▲9	▼1
Popular vote	3,752,116	3,497,179	553,426
Percentage	46.4%	43.3%	6.8%
Swing	▼4.1 pp	▲4.1 pp	▼0.3 pp
- Results for the single-member constituencies.
Government before election
First Meyers cabinet
CDU
Government after election
Second Meyers cabinet
CDU–FDP

The 1962 North Rhine-Westphalia state election was held on 8 July 1962 to elect the 5th Landtag of North Rhine-Westphalia. The outgoing government was a majority of the Christian Democratic Union (CDU) led by Minister-President Franz Meyers.

The CDU lost its majority with a decline of four percentage points to 46%, but remained the largest party by a small margin. The opposition Social Democratic Party (SPD) saw a corresponding gain of four points and won 43%. The Free Democratic Party (FDP) remained steady on 7%. The CDU subsequently formed a coalition with the FDP, and Franz Meyers continued as Minister-President.

== Electoral system ==
The Landtag was elected via mixed-member proportional representation and had a term of four years. 150 members were elected in single-member constituencies via first-past-the-post voting, and fifty then allocated using compensatory proportional representation. A single ballot was used for both. An electoral threshold of 5% of valid votes is applied to the Landtag; parties that fall below this threshold are ineligible to receive seats. Overhang seats were not compensated.

== Background ==
In the previous election held on 6 July 1958, the CDU won a landslide victory and took an absolute majority of both votes and seats. The SPD also achieved a swing in its favour, while the FDP and other minors parties suffered losses. The outgoing SPD-led coalition lost its majority and was replaced by a majority government of the CDU led by Franz Meyers.

== Parties ==
Name		Ideology	Lead candidate	1958 result	
Name		Ideology	Lead candidate	Votes (%)	Seats
CDU	Christian Democratic Union of Germany; Christlich Demokratische Union Deutschlands	Christian democracy	Franz Meyers	50.5%	104 / 200
SPD	Social Democratic Party of Germany; Sozialdemokratische Partei Deutschlands	Social democracy	Heinz Kühn	39.2%	81 / 200
FDP	Free Democratic Party; Freie Demokratische Partei	Classical liberalism	Willi Weyer	7.1%	15 / 200

== Results ==
Party	Votes	%	+/–	Seats			
Party	Votes	%	+/–	Con.	List	Total	+/–
Christian Democratic Union (CDU)	3,752,116	46.42	–4.05	76	20	96	–8
Social Democratic Party (SPD)	3,497,179	43.27	+4.07	74	16	90	+9
Free Democratic Party (FDP)	553,426	6.85	–0.27	0	14	14	–1
German Peace Union (DFU)	164,333	2.03	New	0	0	0	New
Centre Party (ZENTRUM)	75,291	0.93	–0.12	0	0	0	±0
All-German Party (GDP)	34,526	0.43	New	0	0	0	New
German Community (DG)	4,917	0.06	+0.06	0	0	0	±0
Independent Workers' Party (UAP)	426	0.01	New	0	0	0	New
Independents	353	0.00	±0.00	–	0	0	±0
Total	8,082,567	100.00	–	150	50	200	±0
Valid votes	8,082,567	98.70					
Invalid/blank votes	106,421	1.30					
Total votes	8,188,988	100.00					
Registered voters/turnout	11,156,285	73.40					
