= 1958 North Rhine-Westphalia state election =

German state election

- 6 July 1958

All 200 seats in the Landtag of North Rhine-Westphalia 101 seats needed for a majority
- Turnout: 8,046,198 (76.6% ▲3.9 pp)

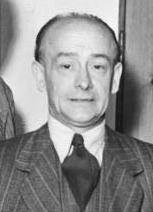

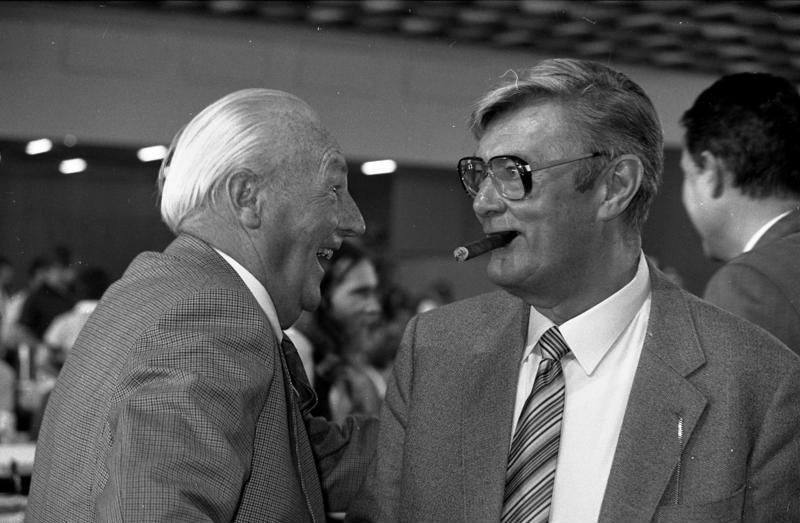
| | First party | Second party | Third party |
|---|---|---|---|
| Candidate | Karl Arnold† | Fritz Steinhoff | Willi Weyer |
| Party | CDU | SPD | FDP |
| Last election | 90 seats, 41.3% | 76 seats, 34.5% | 25 seats, 11.5% |
| Seats won | 104 | 81 | 15 |
| Seat change | ▲14 | ▲5 | ▼10 |
| Popular vote | 4,011,419 | 3,115,738 | 566,258 |
| Percentage | 50.5% | 39.2% | 7.1% |
| Swing | ▲9.2 pp | ▲4.7 pp | ▼4.4 pp |
- Results for the single-member constituencies.
Government before election
Steinhoff cabinet
SPD–FDP–Centre
Government after election
First Meyers cabinet
CDU

The 1958 North Rhine-Westphalia state election was held on 6 July 1958 to elect the 4th Landtag of North Rhine-Westphalia. The outgoing government was a coalition of the Social Democratic Party (SPD), Free Democratic Party (FDP) and Centre Party led by Minister-President Fritz Steinhoff.

The result was a landslide victory for the opposition Christian Democratic Union (CDU), which won an absolute majority of both votes and seats on a swing of over nine percentage points. Despite its defeat, the SPD also improved its vote share to 39%. The main losses were felt by minor parties: the FDP fell to 7%, while the Centre Party collapsed to 1% and left the Landtag for good. Other parties which had fallen short of entering parliament in 1954, the KPD and BHE, no longer ran.

The CDU's lead candidate was former Minister-President Karl Arnold, who had served from 1947 until being removed by a motion of no confidence partway through the previous term in 1956. His government was replaced by a new SPD-led coalition. Arnold unexpectedly died just before the election on 29 June, leaving the CDU without an official leader. After the election, former interior minister Franz Meyers became Minister-President of the new CDU majority government.

== Electoral system ==
The Landtag was elected via mixed-member proportional representation and had a term of four years. 150 members were elected in single-member constituencies via first-past-the-post voting, and fifty then allocated using compensatory proportional representation. A single ballot was used for both. An electoral threshold of 5% of valid votes is applied to the Landtag; parties that fall below this threshold are ineligible to receive seats. Overhang seats were not compensated.

== Background ==
In the previous election held on 27 June 1954, the CDU and SPD both saw swings to 41.3% and 34.5% respectively. The FDP remained steady on 11.5% while the Centre fell to 4% and only narrowly retained its seats thanks to a quirk of the electoral law. The KPD declined to 3.8% and lost representation. The outgoing CDU–Centre government lost its majority, and the CDU expanded the coalition to include the FDP.

In early 1956, the FDP withdrew from government due to efforts by the federal CDU government to introduce parallel voting. Together with the SPD, they passed a constructive motion of no confidence and elected SPD leader Fritz Steinhoff as Minister-President, replacing Karl Arnold. The new government had only a slim majority and thus the Centre was brought into cabinet, with Rudolf Amelunxen appointed justice minister. This coalition governed until the 1958 election.

== Parties ==
| Name | | Ideology | Lead candidate | 1954 result | |
| Name | | Ideology | Lead candidate | Votes (%) | Seats |
|---|---|---|---|---|---|
| CDU | Christian Democratic Union of Germany; Christlich Demokratische Union Deutschlands | Christian democracy | Karl Arnold† | 41.3% | 90 / 200 |
| SPD | Social Democratic Party of Germany; Sozialdemokratische Partei Deutschlands | Social democracy | Fritz Steinhoff | 34.5% | 76 / 200 |
| FDP | Free Democratic Party; Freie Demokratische Partei | Classical liberalism | Willi Weyer | 11.5% | 25 / 200 |
| ZENTRUM | Centre Party; Deutsche Zentrumspartei | Political Catholicism | Rudolf Amelunxen | 4.0% | 9 / 200 |

== Results ==
Graph of the party split among 200 seats.
| Party | Votes | % | +/– | Seats | | | |
| Party | Votes | % | +/– | Con. | List | Total | +/– |
|---|---|---|---|---|---|---|---|
| Christian Democratic Union (CDU) | 4,011,419 | 50.47 | +9.22 | 92 | 12 | 104 | +14 |
| Social Democratic Party (SPD) | 3,115,738 | 39.20 | +4.71 | 58 | 23 | 81 | +5 |
| Free Democratic Party (FDP) | 566,258 | 7.12 | –4.35 | 0 | 15 | 15 | –10 |
| German Party (DP) | 125,696 | 1.58 | +1.55 | 0 | 0 | 0 | ±0 |
| Centre Party (ZENTRUM) | 83,720 | 1.05 | –2.98 | 0 | 0 | 0 | –9 |
| German Reich Party (DRP) | 43,299 | 0.54 | New | 0 | 0 | 0 | New |
| German Social Union (DSU) | 540 | 0.01 | New | 0 | 0 | 0 | New |
| German Community (DG) | 220 | 0.00 | New | 0 | 0 | 0 | New |
| Alliance of Germans (BdD) | 176 | 0.00 | –0.28 | 0 | 0 | 0 | ±0 |
| Independents | 1,112 | 0.01 | +0.01 | – | 0 | 0 | ±0 |
| Total | 7,948,178 | 100.00 | – | 150 | 50 | 200 | ±0 |
| Valid votes | 7,948,178 | 98.78 | | | | | |
| Invalid/blank votes | 98,020 | 1.22 | | | | | |
| Total votes | 8,046,198 | 100.00 | | | | | |
| Registered voters/turnout | 10,507,956 | 76.57 | | | | | |
