= 1975 North Rhine-Westphalia state election =

German state election

← 1970	4 May 1975	1980 →

All 200 seats in the Landtag of North Rhine-Westphalia 101 seats needed for a majority
- Turnout: 10,358,108 (86.1% ▲12.6 pp)
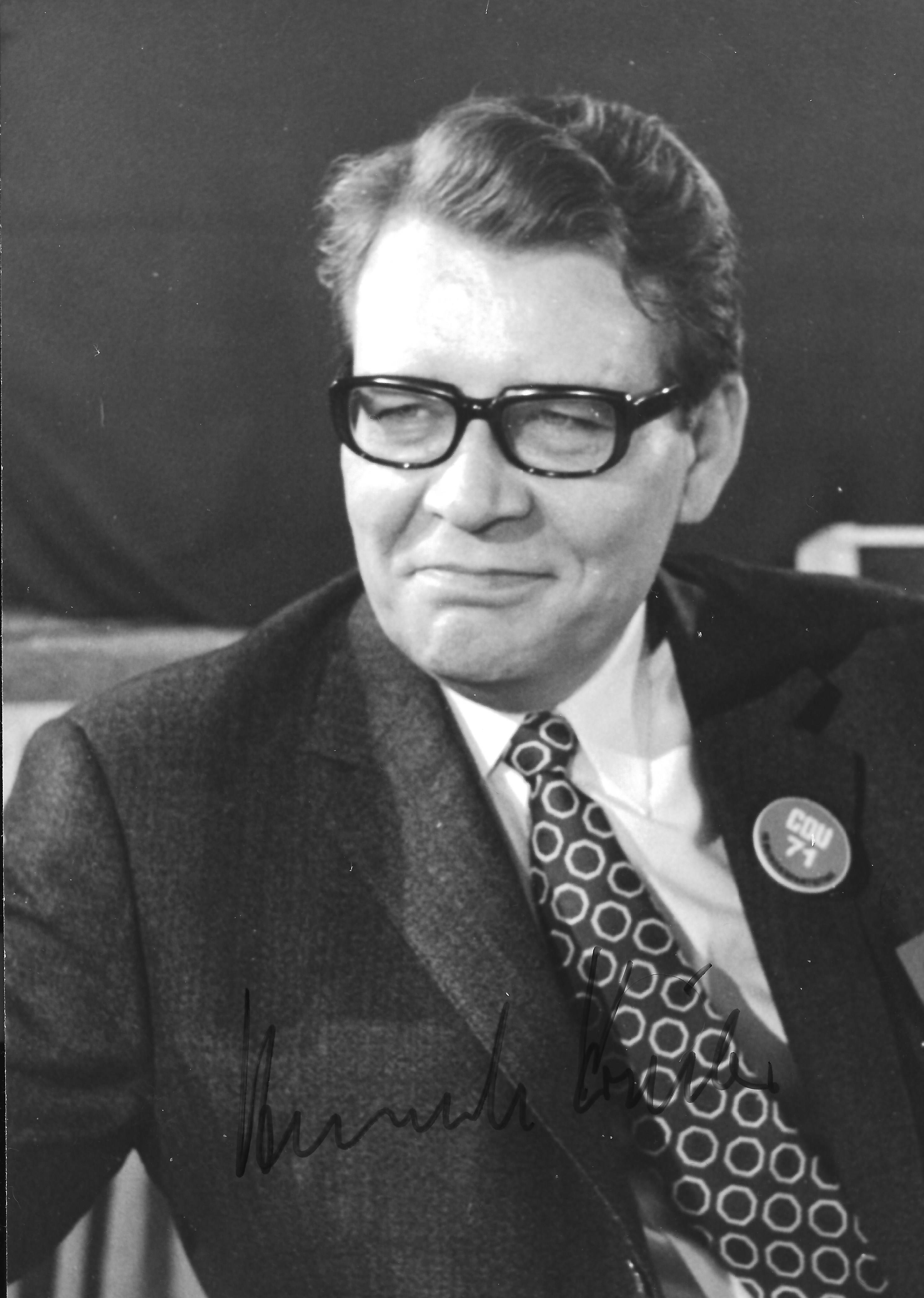

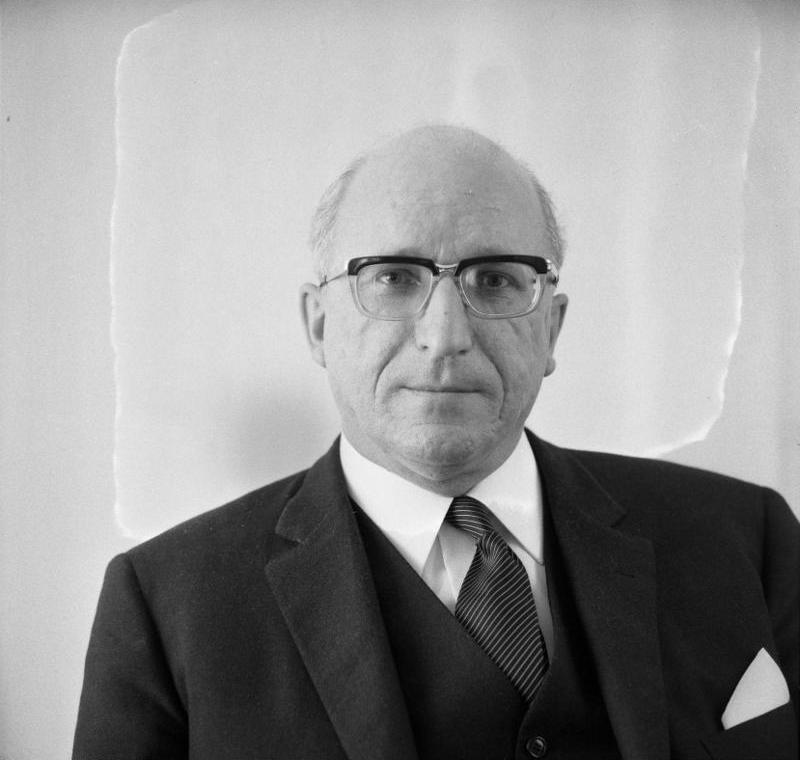

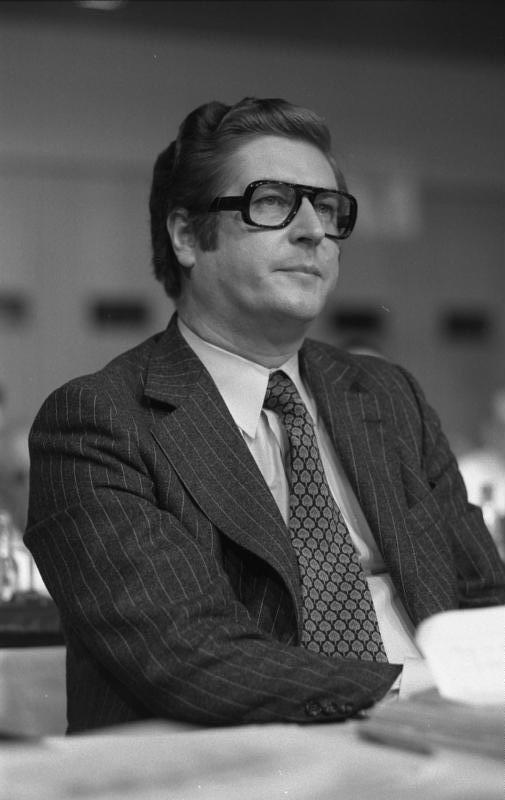
	First party	Second party	Third party
Candidate	Heinrich Köppler	Heinz Kühn	Horst-Ludwig Riemer
Party	CDU	SPD	FDP
Last election	95 seats, 46.3%	94 seats, 46.1%	11 seats, 5.5%
Seats won	95	91	14
Seat change	0	▼3	▲3
Popular vote	4,828,554	4,630,995	689,623
Percentage	47.1%	45.1%	6.7%
Swing	▲0.8 pp	▼1.0 pp	▲1.2 pp
- Results for the single-member constituencies.
Government before election
Second Kühn cabinet
SPD–FDP
Government after election
Third Kühn cabinet
SPD–FDP

The 1975 North Rhine-Westphalia state election was held on 4 May 1975 to elect the 8th Landtag of North Rhine-Westphalia. The outgoing government was a coalition of the Social Democratic Party (SPD) and Free Democratic Party (FDP) led by Minister-President Heinz Kühn.

The opposition Christian Democratic Union (CDU) remained the largest party and improved its lead over the SPD, but failed to win an overall majority. The incumbent coalition retained the 105-seat majority it had won at the previous election, with a net shift of three seats from the SPD to the FDP. Turnout increased dramatically to 86.1%, the highest ever recorded in the state. The SPD–FDP coalition was renewed and Heinz Kühn was re-elected as Minister-President by the Landtag on 4 June.

== Electoral system ==
The Landtag was elected via mixed-member proportional representation. 150 members were elected in single-member constituencies via first-past-the-post voting, and fifty then allocated using compensatory proportional representation. A single ballot was used for both. An electoral threshold of 5% of valid votes is applied to the Landtag; parties that fall below this threshold are ineligible to receive seats.

== Background ==
In the previous election held on 14 June 1970, the CDU returned as the largest party with a narrow one-seat lead over the SPD. The SPD and FDP both suffered losses, but retained a small majority. The governing coalition between the two was subsequently renewed.

== Parties ==
The table below lists parties represented in the 7th Landtag of North Rhine-Westphalia.

Name		Ideology	Lead candidate	1970 result	
Name		Ideology	Lead candidate	Votes (%)	Seats
CDU	Christian Democratic Union of Germany; Christlich Demokratische Union Deutschlands	Christian democracy	Heinrich Köppler	46.3%	95 / 200
SPD	Social Democratic Party of Germany; Sozialdemokratische Partei Deutschlands	Social democracy	Heinz Kühn	46.1%	94 / 200
FDP	Free Democratic Party; Freie Demokratische Partei	Classical liberalism	Willi Weyer	5.5%	11 / 200

== Results ==
Party	Votes	%	+/–	Seats			
Party	Votes	%	+/–	Con.	List	Total	+/–
Christian Democratic Union (CDU)	4,828,554	47.05	+0.72	76	19	95	±0
Social Democratic Party (SPD)	4,630,995	45.13	–0.93	74	17	91	–3
Free Democratic Party (FDP)	689,623	6.72	+1.21	0	14	14	+3
German Communist Party (DKP)	54,777	0.53	–0.36	0	0	0	±0
National Democratic Party (NPD)	36,281	0.35	–0.73	0	0	0	±0
Centre Party (ZENTRUM)	10,487	0.10	–0.01	0	0	0	±0
Communist Party of Germany (AO)	7,711	0.08	New	0	0	0	New
Communist Party of Germany/M–L	1,731	0.02	New	0	0	0	New
Independent Workers' Party (UAP)	648	0.01	–0.01	0	0	0	±0
European Labour Party (EAP)	311	0.00	New	0	0	0	New
Independents	1,087	0.01	New	0	–	0	New
Total	10,262,205	100.00	–	150	50	200	±0
Valid votes	10,262,205	99.07					
Invalid/blank votes	95,903	0.93					
Total votes	10,358,108	100.00					
Registered voters/turnout	12,035,289	86.06					
