= 1947 North Rhine-Westphalia state election =

German state election

- 20 April 1947

All 216 seats in the Landtag of North Rhine-Westphalia, including 16 overhang seats 109 seats needed for a majority
- Turnout: 5,290,598 (67.3%)

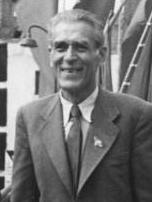

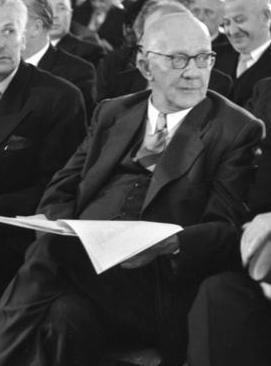

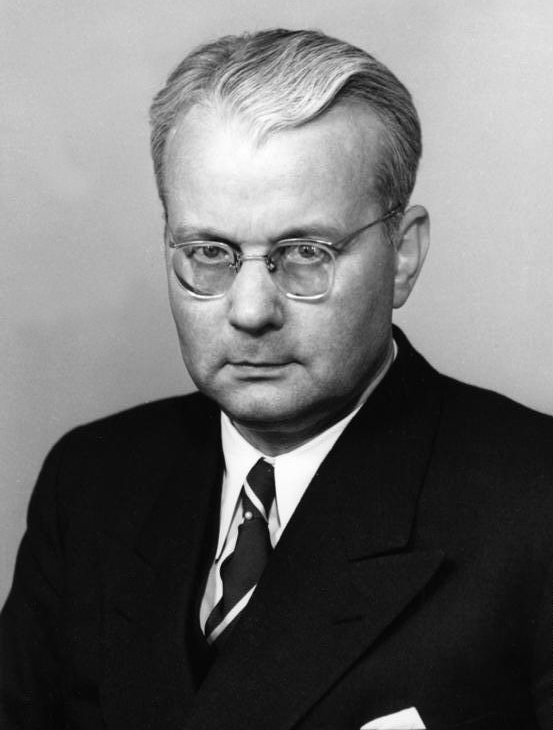
	First party	Second party	Third party
Candidate	Karl Arnold	Fritz Henßler	Max Reimann
Party	CDU	SPD	KPD
Seats won	92	64	28
Popular vote	1,889,581	1,607,487	702,410
Percentage	37.6%	32.0%	14.0%
	Fourth party	Fifth party
Candidate	Rudolf Amelunxen	Franz Blücher
Party	Centre	FDP
Seats won	20	12
Popular vote	491,138	298,995
Percentage	9.8%	6.0%
- Results for the single-member constituencies.
Government before election
Second Amelunxen cabinet
CDU–SPD–KPD–Centre–FDP
Government after election
First Arnold cabinet
CDU–SPD–KPD–Centre

The 1947 North Rhine-Westphalia state election was held on 20 April 1947 to elect the 1st Landtag of North Rhine-Westphalia. Prior to the election, the state was governed by a parliament appointed by British occupying authorities comprising 100 members from the Rhineland and 100 from Westphalia, and later four from Lippe. The outgoing government was an all-party coalition headed by Rudolf Amelunxen.

The Christian Democratic Union (CDU) emerged as the largest party with 37.6% and 92 seats, followed by the Social Democratic Party (SPD) with 32.0% and 64 seats. The Communist Party (KPD) placed third with 14%, followed by the Centre Party on 10% and Free Democratic Party (FDP) on 6%. The election did not take place in constituency 40 Kleve until 18 May; it was won by the CDU. Overall, the CDU won 16 overhang seats.

After the election, CDU leader Karl Arnold became Minister-President in a coalition of all parties except the FDP.

== Electoral system ==
The Landtag was elected via mixed-member proportional representation and originally had a term of three years. 150 members were elected in single-member constituencies via first-past-the-post voting, and fifty then allocated using compensatory proportional representation. A single ballot was used for both. An electoral threshold of 5% of valid votes is applied to the Landtag; parties that fall below this threshold are ineligible to receive seats. Overhang seats were not compensated. Only parties and candidates approved by the occupying authorities were able to run, and candidates had to be over 25 years old. All citizens over 21 years, as well as those deprived of citizenship after 1933 for political reasons, were eligible to vote. Those with close association to the Nazi regime were barred from voting or running for election.

== Background ==
Since the end of the Second World War, the areas comprising the former Prussian provinces of Westphalia and the northern part of the Rhine Province (the districts of Aachen, Cologne, and Düsseldorf) had been occupied by the United Kingdom. In August 1946, these areas were combined to form the state of North Rhine-Westphalia. In January 1947, the Free State of Lippe was also annexed to the new state.

A new parliament was appointed by British authorities comprising 100 representatives for the North Rhine and 100 for Westphalia, with an additional four added for Lippe after its annexation. The appointed parliament first met in October 1946. It was made up of members of five political parties: the Social Democratic Party (71 seats), Christian Democratic Union (66), Communist Party (34), Centre Party (18), and Free Democratic Party (9). The number of seats allocated to each party was based on the reckoning of the British authorities, and was revised at the end of November to reflect the results of the first local elections which were won by the CDU. The appointed parliament had very limited power, as governance was mostly regulated by the occupying authorities. It gained the power to pass its own laws at the start of December, but they still required approval from the British military governor, a restriction which remained until May 1949. The law regulating the election of the Landtag was passed in March.

== Parties ==
Name		Ideology	Lead candidate
CDU	Christian Democratic Union of Germany; Christlich Demokratische Union Deutschlands	Christian democracy	Karl Arnold
SPD	Social Democratic Party of Germany; Sozialdemokratische Partei Deutschlands	Social democracy	Fritz Henßler
KPD	Communist Party of Germany; Kommunistische Partei Deutschlands	Communism	Max Reimann
ZENTRUM	Centre Party; Deutsche Zentrumspartei	Political Catholicism	Rudolf Amelunxen
FDP	Free Democratic Party; Freie Demokratische Partei	Classical liberalism	Franz Blücher

== Results ==
Graph of the party split among 223 seats.
Party	Votes	%	Seats		
Party	Votes	%	Con.	List	Total
Christian Democratic Union (CDU)	1,889,581	37.57	92	0	92
Social Democratic Party (SPD)	1,607,487	31.97	53	11	64
Communist Party (KPD)	702,410	13.97	3	25	28
Centre Party (ZENTRUM)	491,138	9.77	2	18	20
Free Democratic Party (FDP)	298,995	5.95	0	12	12
German Right Party (DKP–DRP)	24,879	0.49	0	0	0
Rhenish People's Party (RVP)	13,547	0.27	0	0	0
Independents	855	0.02	0	–	0
Total	5,028,892	100.00	150	66	216
Valid votes	5,028,892	95.05			
Invalid/blank votes	261,706	4.95			
Total votes	5,290,598	100.00			
Registered voters/turnout	7,860,608	67.31			
