= Erna Herchenröder =

German trade unionist politician (1903–1977)

Member of the Landtag of North Rhine-Westphalia
- In office 23 October 1953 – 12 July 1958
- Constituency: Party list (1953–1954); Bochum-Nordost (1954–1958)

Member of the Bochum City Council
- In office 1946–?

Personal details
- Born: Erna Lohmann; 6 March 1903 Harpen, Bochum, Kingdom of Prussia, German Empire
- Died: 3 September 1977 (aged 74) Bochum, North Rhine-Westphalia, West Germany
- Party: Social Democratic Party
- Spouse: Alfred Herchenröder

Erna Herchenröder-Lohmann (née Lohmann; 6 March 1903 – 3 September 1977) was a German trade unionist and politician who served in the Landtag of North Rhine-Westphalia from 1953 until 1958. A member of the Social Democratic Party, she represented portions of Bochum.

== Biography ==
Erna Herchenröder-Lohmann was born on 6 March 1903 in the Harpen neighborhood of Bochum in Westphalia. She was educated at elementary and business school. From a young age, Herchenröder was active in trade unions as a member of the Socialist Workers' Youth (Sozialistische Arbeiter-Jugend) from 1918 until 1925. From 1919 until 1922, she was an accountant in the Union of Miners of Germany and was a member of the General Federation of Free Employees. When she worked as a clerical assistant for the Bochum city administration from 1923 until 1928, she was concurrently a member of the Reich Union of German Municipal Officials. She later became a housewife, and was the managing director of the Herchenröder Company from 1940 until 1942/3.

A member of the Social Democratic Party since 1921, Herchenröder was elected to the Bochum city council in 1946, receiving 4,910 votes. On 23 October 1953, the SPD appointed her to the Landtag of North Rhine-Westphalia, filling a vacant seat in the party's state list (landesliste). Herchenröder was elected for a full term in the 1954 North Rhine-Westphalia state election; standing in the Bochum-Nordost constituency, she received 49.3% of the vote (26,657 votes), a margin-of-victory of over 18%. While in the Landtag, she was a member of the social and women's policy committee. Herchenröder left office at the end of her term on 12 July 1958.

Herchenröder died in Bochum on 3 September 1977.
