= 1954 North Rhine-Westphalia state election =

German state election

- 27 June 1954

All 200 seats in the Landtag of North Rhine-Westphalia 101 seats needed for a majority
- Turnout: 7,068,392 (72.6% ▲0.3 pp)

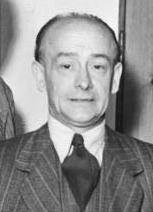

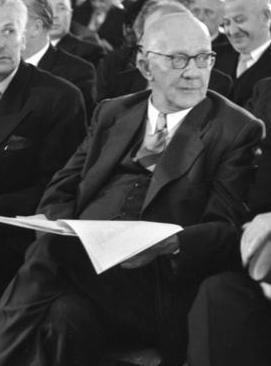
	First party	Second party
Candidate	Karl Arnold	Fritz Steinhoff
Party	CDU	SPD
Last election	93 seats, 36.9%	68 seats, 32.3%
Seats won	90	76
Seat change	▼3	▲8
Popular vote	2,855,988	2,387,718
Percentage	41.3%	34.5%
Swing	▲4.4 pp	▲2.2 pp
	Third party	Fourth party
Candidate	Friedrich Middelhauve	Rudolf Amelunxen
Party	FDP	Centre
Last election	26 seats, 12.1%	16 seats, 7.5%
Seats won	25	9
Seat change	▼1	▼7
Popular vote	793,736	278,863
Percentage	11.5%	4.0%
Swing	▼0.6 pp	▼3.5 pp
- Results for the single-member constituencies.
Government before election
Second Arnold cabinet
CDU–Centre
Government after election
Third Arnold cabinet
CDU–FDP–Centre

The 1954 North Rhine-Westphalia state election was held on 27 June 1954 to elect the 3rd Landtag of North Rhine-Westphalia. The outgoing government was a coalition of the Christian Democratic Union (CDU) and Centre Party led by Minister-President Karl Arnold.

The CDU remained the largest party and improved its result to 41.3%, a swing of 4.4 percentage points. The Social Democratic Party (SPD) also improved slightly and finished on 34.5%. The Free Democratic Party (FDP) remained steady on 11.5%, while the Centre Party fell below the 5% electoral threshold and only very narrowly retained its seats due to a quirk of the electoral law. The Communist Party (KPD) declined to 3.8% and lost representation; the League of Expellees (BHE) ran for the first time and fell short of entering the Landtag with 4.5%.

Due to concerns that the Centre could fall below 5% and lose its seats, the CDU stood aside in constituency 62 (Essen Borbeck-Karnap) and endorsed the Centre candidate. Though the SPD won the constituency, the Centre were able to retain their seats thanks to an amendment to the electoral law which entitled parties which won a constituency, or won at least one-third of votes in any constituency, to proportional representation regardless of their statewide vote share. The Centre candidate in constituency 62 won 33.4%, just 26 votes above the quota.

Despite the Centre retaining their seats, the outgoing government lost its majority. The CDU formed a new coalition with the FDP and Centre.

== Electoral system ==
The Landtag was elected via mixed-member proportional representation and had a term of four years. 150 members were elected in single-member constituencies via first-past-the-post voting, and fifty then allocated using compensatory proportional representation. A single ballot was used for both. An electoral threshold of 5% of valid votes is applied to the Landtag; parties that fall below this threshold are ineligible to receive seats unless they win at least one constituency. In the 1954 election, parties which won at least one-third of votes in any constituency were also entitled to proportional representation. Overhang seats were not compensated.

== Background ==
In the previous election held on 18 June 1950, the CDU remained the largest party with 37%, followed by the SPD on 32%. The FDP doubled its vote share to 12%, while the Centre declined to 7.5% and the KPD lost most of their support and finished with 5.5%. Alongside the election, the new state constitution was approved by a comfortable margin. The CDU chose not to renew the outgoing grand coalition and, after a brief period of minority government, formed a coalition with the Centre. Minister-President Karl Arnold continued in office.

== Parties ==
Name		Ideology	Lead candidate	1950 result	
Name		Ideology	Lead candidate	Votes (%)	Seats
CDU	Christian Democratic Union of Germany; Christlich Demokratische Union Deutschlands	Christian democracy	Karl Arnold	36.9%	93 / 215
SPD	Social Democratic Party of Germany; Sozialdemokratische Partei Deutschlands	Social democracy	Fritz Steinhoff	32.3%	68 / 215
FDP	Free Democratic Party; Freie Demokratische Partei	Classical liberalism	Friedrich Middelhauve	12.1%	26 / 215
ZENTRUM	Centre Party; Deutsche Zentrumspartei	Political Catholicism	Rudolf Amelunxen	7.5%	16 / 215
KPD	Communist Party of Germany; Kommunistische Partei Deutschlands	Communism		5.5%	12 / 215

== Results ==
Graph of the party split among 200 seats.
Party	Votes	%	+/–	Seats			
Party	Votes	%	+/–	Con.	List	Total	+/–
Christian Democratic Union (CDU)	2,855,988	41.25	+4.38	85	5	90	–3
Social Democratic Party (SPD)	2,387,718	34.49	+2.15	65	11	76	+8
Free Democratic Party (FDP)	793,736	11.47	–0.61	0	25	25	–1
League of Expellees and Deprived of Rights (BHE)	320,676	4.63	New	0	0	0	New
Centre Party (ZENTRUM)	278,863	4.03	–3.49	0	9	9	–7
Communist Party of Germany (KPD)	264,083	3.81	–1.65	0	0	0	–12
Alliance of Germans (BdD)	19,515	0.28	New	0	0	0	New
German Party (DP)	1,898	0.03	–1.69	0	0	0	±0
Independents	592	0.01	–0.10	–	0	0	±0
Total	6,923,069	100.00	–	150	50	200	–15
Valid votes	6,923,069	97.94					
Invalid/blank votes	145,323	2.06					
Total votes	7,068,392	100.00					
Registered voters/turnout	9,730,072	72.64					
