= 1950 North Rhine-Westphalia state election =

German state election

- 18 June 1950

All 215 seats in the Landtag of North Rhine-Westphalia, including 15 overhang seats 108 seats needed for a majority
- Turnout: 6,433,003 (72.3% ▲5.0 pp)

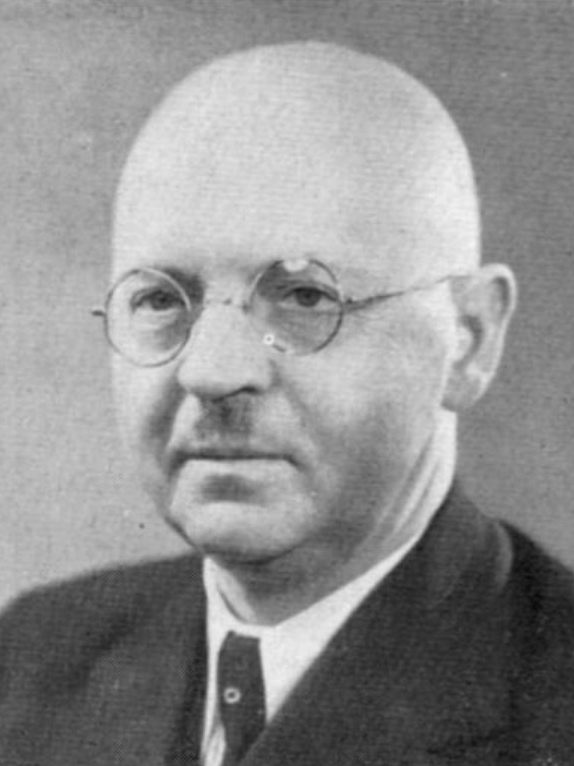

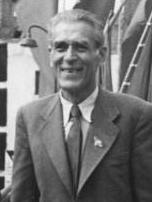
	First party	Second party	Third party
Candidate	Karl Arnold	Fritz Henßler	Friedrich Middelhauve
Party	CDU	SPD	FDP
Last election	92 seats, 37.6%	64 seats, 32.0%	12 seats, 6.0%
Seats won	93	68	26
Seat change	▲1	▲4	▲14
Popular vote	2,286,644	2,005,312	748,926
Percentage	36.9%	32.3%	12.1%
Swing	▼0.7 pp	▲0.4 pp	▲6.1 pp
	Fourth party	Fifth party
Candidate	Johannes Brockmann	Max Reimann
Party	Centre	KPD
Last election	20 seats, 9.8%	28 seats, 14.0%
Seats won	16	12
Seat change	▼4	▼16
Popular vote	466,497	338,862
Percentage	7.5%	5.5%
Swing	▼2.3 pp	▼8.5 pp
- Results for the single-member constituencies.
Government before election
First Arnold cabinet
CDU–SPD–Centre
Government after election
Second Arnold cabinet
CDU (Note: CDU alone until 15 September 1950; thereafter CDU–Centre.)

The 1950 North Rhine-Westphalia state election was held on 18 June 1950 to elect the 2nd Landtag of North Rhine-Westphalia. The outgoing government was a coalition of the Christian Democratic Union (CDU), Social Democratic Party (SPD), and Centre Party led by Minister-President Karl Arnold.

The CDU remained the largest party with 37% and 93 seats, followed by the Social Democratic Party (SPD) with 32% and 68 seats. The Free Democratic Party (FDP) doubled its vote share to 12%, while the Centre Party declined to 7.5%. The Communist Party (KPD) lost most of its vote share and fell to fifth place on 5.5%. Overall, the CDU won 15 overhang seats.

Alongside the election, the state constitution was submitted for public approval. It was supported by the CDU and Centre, who had been primarily responsible for drafting it, while the SPD, KPD, and FDP campaigned against it. The constitution was approved with 3.63 million votes in favour (57.0%) and 2.24 million against (35.2%). The British occupying authorities approved the constitution on 8 July, and it entered into force on 11 July.

The CDU declined to renew the outgoing grand coalition, and the CDU briefly formed minority government alone with Karl Arnold continuing as Minister-President. Six weeks later they agreed to a coalition with the Centre, whose ministers were appointed on 15 September and brought the government into majority for the rest of the term.

== Electoral system ==
The Landtag was elected via mixed-member proportional representation and originally had a term of three years. 150 members were elected in single-member constituencies via first-past-the-post voting, and fifty then allocated using compensatory proportional representation. A single ballot was used for both. An electoral threshold of 5% of valid votes is applied to the Landtag; parties that fall below this threshold are ineligible to receive seats unless they win at least one constituency. Overhang seats were not compensated.

== Background ==
In the previous, inaugural election held on 20 April 1947, the CDU emerged as the largest party with 37.6%, followed by the SPD on 32%, KPD on 14%, Centre on 10%, and FDP on 6%. All parties were invited to a coalition government led by CDU leader Karl Arnold, though the FDP declined to join. The KPD ministers were dismissed in April 1948 for refusing to distance themselves from parliamentary leader Josef Ledwohn.

The first Landtag was tasked with drafting the state constitution. A first draft was already put forward before the inaugural election, by SPD interior minister Walter Menzel. A constitutional committee was established in the first Landtag on 20 May, comprising 14 members: 6 from the CDU, 4 from the SPD, 2 from the KPD, and one each from the Centre and FDP. The KPD put forward their own draft in September; later in the year, interior minister Menzel submitted a second draft which included a charter of fundamental rights added on the suggestion of the British authorities. The FDP also submitted a counter-draft to Menzel's proposal.

Compared to many other states, the process of establishing a constitution in North Rhine-Westphalia was drawn-out and delayed, in part due to uncertainties about the future of the state; many believed it would be split into new states. The question fell off the agenda going into 1948 as the work of the Parlamentarischer Rat, the Basic Law and the establishment of the Federal Republic (West Germany) took precedence. The government and politicians of North Rhine-Westphalia were heavily involved in this process, and the Rhenish city of Bonn became the new provisional capital of the Federal Republic.

The state constitution returned to the agenda at the end of 1949. Menzel's draft was once again submitted to the committee, as was a new draft from Minister-President Karl Arnold. Numerous committee meetings took place over the following months, but the committee was perpetually deadlocked seven votes to seven, with the CDU and Centre supporting Arnold's proposal while the SPD, KPD, and FDP supported Menzel's. The main point of conflict was education policy: the SPD, KPD, and FDP demanded integrated schools, while the CDU and Centre wanted parents to be able to choose separate religious schools. Issues also emerged with the charter of fundamental rights, which had now been addressed by the Basic Law for the Federal Republic. Arnold's proposal also sought to strengthen the Minister-President's powers, while the SPD wanted to strengthen parliament and include elements of direct democracy such as initiatives and referendums. Arnold's draft also codified a majoritarian electoral system for the Landtag and provided for a second chamber of parliament representing the municipalities. The SPD also opposed the establishment of a state constitutional court. To ensure deliberations could be completed and the constitution was submitted for public approval alongside the election of the second Landtag, the legislative period was extended by an additional three months beyond its legal three-year term. This has not been done since.

The final draft approved by the Landtag most closely resembled Arnold's, though several compromises were made: the proposed second chamber and majoritarian voting system were dropped, while provisions for initiatives and referendums were added. A charter of fundamental rights was included, as was the state constitutional court. Most contentiously, religious schools and parental choice remained. The draft was approved by the Landtag on 6 June with 110 votes in favour and 97 against. The vote split along party lines, with the CDU and Centre voting for and the SPD, KPD, and FDP against.

== Parties ==
Name		Ideology	Lead candidate	1947 result	
Name		Ideology	Lead candidate	Votes (%)	Seats
CDU	Christian Democratic Union of Germany; Christlich Demokratische Union Deutschlands	Christian democracy	Karl Arnold	37.6%	92 / 216
SPD	Social Democratic Party of Germany; Sozialdemokratische Partei Deutschlands	Social democracy	Fritz Henßler	32.0%	64 / 216
KPD	Communist Party of Germany; Kommunistische Partei Deutschlands	Communism	Max Reimann	14.0%	28 / 216
ZENTRUM	Centre Party; Deutsche Zentrumspartei	Political Catholicism	Johannes Brockmann	9.8%	20 / 216
FDP	Free Democratic Party; Freie Demokratische Partei	Classical liberalism	Friedrich Middelhauve	6.0%	12 / 216

== Results ==
Graph of the party split among 215 seats.
Party	Votes	%	±	Seats			
Party	Votes	%	±	Con.	List	Total	+/–
Christian Democratic Union (CDU)	2,286,644	36.87	–0.70	93	0	93	+1
Social Democratic Party (SPD)	2,005,312	32.34	+0.37	52	16	68	+4
Free Democratic Party (FDP)	748,926	12.08	+6.13	5	21	26	+14
Centre Party (ZENTRUM)	466,497	7.52	–2.25	0	16	16	–4
Communist Party of Germany (KPD)	338,862	5.46	–8.51	0	12	12	–14
Radical-Social Freedom Party (RSF)	122,878	1.98	New	0	0	0	New
German Reich Party (DRP)	107,104	1.73	New	0	0	0	New
German Party (DP)	106,351	1.72	New	0	0	0	New
Socialist Reich Party (SRP)	11,359	0.18	New	0	0	0	New
Christian-Social Labour League (SCAB)	107	0.00	New	0	0	0	New
Independents	7,077	0.11	+0.09	–	0	0	±0
Total	6,201,117	100.00	–	150	65	215	–1
Valid votes	6,201,117	96.40					
Invalid/blank votes	231,886	3.60					
Total votes	6,433,003	100.00					
Registered voters/turnout	8,892,305	72.34					

=== Constitutional referendum ===
Referendum on the Constitution adopted by the Landtag
Choice	Votes	%
Approve	3,627,054	61.81
Reject	2,240,674	38.19
Total	5,867,728	100.00
Valid votes	5,867,728	92.20
Invalid/blank votes	496,555	7.80
Total votes	6,364,283	100.00
Registered voters/turnout	8,892,305	71.57
