= 1980 North Rhine-Westphalia state election =

German state election

← 1975	11 May 1980	1985 →

All 201 seats in the Landtag of North Rhine-Westphalia 101 seats needed for a majority
- Turnout: 9,874,427 (80.0% ▼6.1 pp)
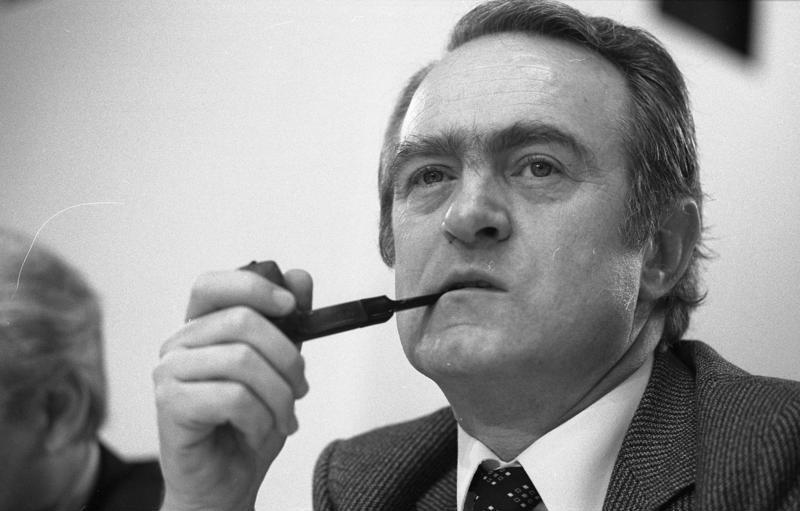

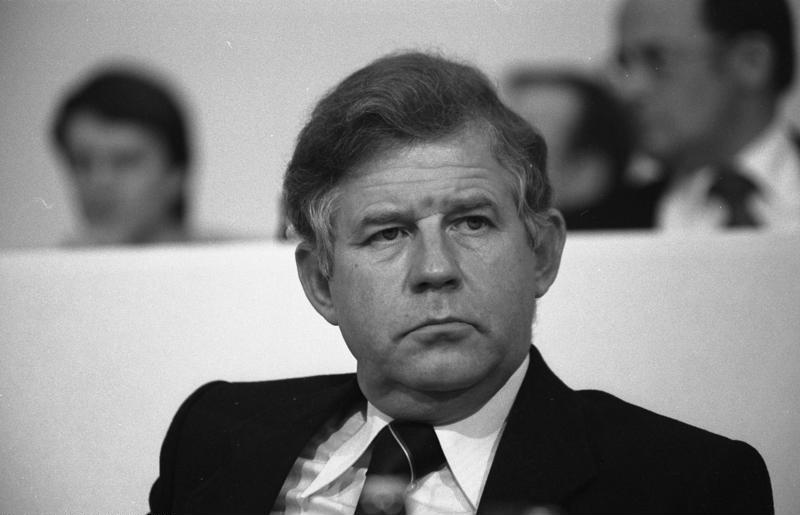

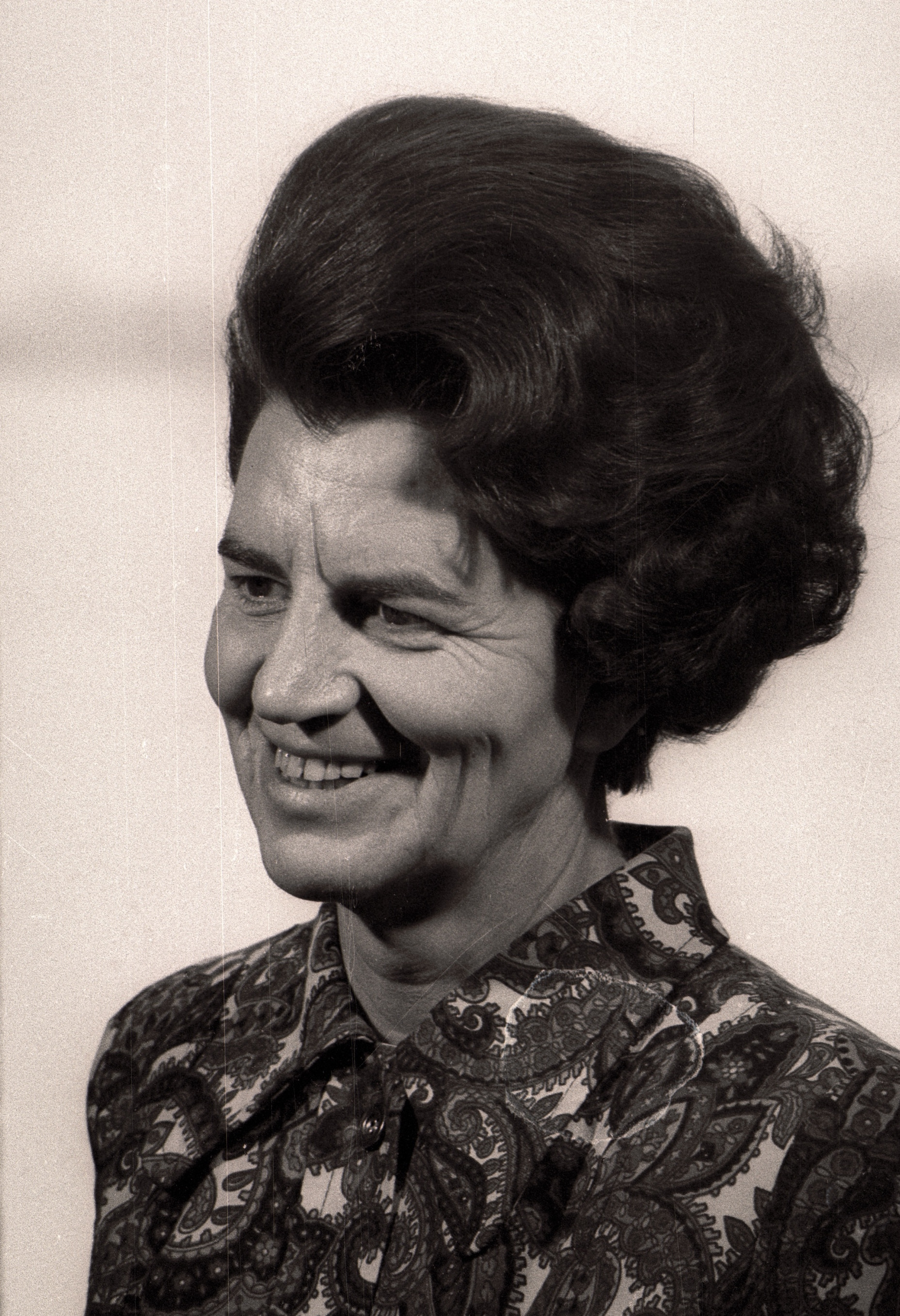
	First party	Second party	Third party
Candidate	Johannes Rau	Kurt Biedenkopf (Note: The CDU's original lead candidate was Heinrich Köppler, who died on 20 April, shortly before the election. Biedenkopf was appointed to replace him.)	Liselotte Funcke
Party	SPD	CDU	FDP
Last election	91 seats, 45.1%	95 seats, 47.1%	14 seats, 6.7%
Seats won	106	95	0
Seat change	▲15	0	▼14
Popular vote	4,756,103	4,240,885	489,225
Percentage	48.4%	43.2%	4.98%
Swing	▲3.3 pp	▼3.9 pp	▼1.7 pp
- Results for the single-member constituencies.
Government before election
First Rau cabinet
SPD–FDP
Government after election
Second Rau cabinet
SPD

The 1980 North Rhine-Westphalia state election was held on 11 May 1980 to elect the 9th Landtag of North Rhine-Westphalia. The outgoing government was a coalition of the Social Democratic Party (SPD) and Free Democratic Party (FDP) led by Minister-President Johannes Rau.

The result was a clear victory for the SPD, who won an absolute majority of 106 seats in the Landtag with 48.4% of the vote. The opposition Christian Democratic Union (CDU) declined to 43.2% and remained steady on 95 seats. The SPD's majority was ensured by the failure of the FDP to re-enter parliament: they fell just short of the 5% electoral threshold and lost all their seats. The SPD went on to form government alone for the first time in the state's history; Johannes Rau was re-elected Minister-President by the Landtag on 4 June.

== Electoral system ==
The Landtag was elected via mixed-member proportional representation. 151 members were elected in single-member constituencies via first-past-the-post voting, and fifty then allocated using compensatory proportional representation. A single ballot was used for both. An electoral threshold of 5% of valid votes is applied to the Landtag; parties that fall below this threshold are ineligible to receive seats.

== Background ==
In the previous election held on 4 May 1975, the CDU remained the largest party with an improved lead over the SPD, while the FDP made small gains. The governing coalition retained its majority and was subsequently renewed. In September 1978, SPD parliamentary leader and culture minister Johannes Rau replaced Heinz Kühn as Minister-President.

== Parties ==
The table below lists parties represented in the 8th Landtag of North Rhine-Westphalia.

Name		Ideology	Lead candidate	1975 result	
Name		Ideology	Lead candidate	Votes (%)	Seats
CDU	Christian Democratic Union of Germany; Christlich Demokratische Union Deutschlands	Christian democracy	Kurt Biedenkopf	47.1%	95 / 200
SPD	Social Democratic Party of Germany; Sozialdemokratische Partei Deutschlands	Social democracy	Johannes Rau	45.1%	91 / 200
FDP	Free Democratic Party; Freie Demokratische Partei	Classical liberalism	Liselotte Funcke	6.7%	14 / 200

== Results ==
Party	Votes	%	+/–	Seats			
Party	Votes	%	+/–	Con.	List	Total	+/–
Social Democratic Party (SPD)	4,756,103	48.44	+3.31	94	12	106	+15
Christian Democratic Union (CDU)	4,240,885	43.19	–3.86	57	38	95	±0
Free Democratic Party (FDP)	489,225	4.98	–1.74	0	0	0	–14
The Greens (GRÜNE)	291,379	2.97	New	0	0	0	New
German Communist Party (DKP)	30,441	0.31	–0.22	0	0	0	±0
The Citizens' Party (Bürgerpartei)	5,410	0.06	New	0	0	0	New
Communist League of West Germany (KBW)	2,282	0.02	New	0	0	0	New
Centre Party (ZENTRUM)	1,562	0.02	–0.08	0	0	0	±0
European Labour Party (EAP)	649	0.01	±0.00	0	0	0	±0
Union for Concrete Environmentalism (UNU)	200	0.00	New	0	0	0	New
Independent Workers' Party (UAP)	180	0.00	±0.00	0	0	0	±0
European Federalist Party (EFP)	92	0.00	New	0	0	0	New
Green Party of Germany (GPD)	38	0.00	New	0	0	0	New
Independents	72	0.00	–0.01	0	–	0	±0
Total	9,818,518	100.00	–	151	50	201	+1
Valid votes	9,818,518	99.43					
Invalid/blank votes	55,909	0.57					
Total votes	9,874,427	100.00					
Registered voters/turnout	12,342,282	80.00					
