= Fritz Henßler =

German politician (1886–1953)

Fritz Henßler (12 April 1886 – 4 December 1953) was a German Social Democratic politician during the Weimar Republic. Removed from office and imprisoned in a concentration camp by Nazi Germany, he returned to politics in West Germany after the end of the Second World War. He was the mayor of Dortmund from 1946 to 1953 and a deputy in the Bundestag from 1949 to 1953.

== Early life and political career in Weimar Germany ==
Henßler was born in Altensteig in the Black Forest section of the Kingdom of Württemberg and was apprenticed as a printer and typesetter. He joined the Social Democratic Party of Germany (SPD) in 1905. He became managing editor of the Westfälische Allgemeine Volkszeitung, the Social Democratic party organ in the Westphalia region in 1911. From 1920 to 1933, Henßler was leader of the SPD branch in Dortmund and, from 1922 to 1933, chairman of the SPD in western Westphalia. In 1924, he was elected to the city council in Dortmund and became its chairman the following year. From 1929, he was also a deputy in the provincial parliament of the Province of Westphalia. In September 1930, he was elected to the Reichstag from electoral constituency 18 (Westphalia South).

== Persecution and imprisonment ==
After the Nazi Party came to power in 1933, Henßler was held in "protective custody" for ten weeks and was forced to relinquish all his public offices. He was arrested by the Gestapo in 1936 and was sentenced to one year in the prison Steinwache. However, instead of being released after one year, Henßler was sent to Sachsenhausen concentration camp in 1937, where he was interned until 1945. He survived the Death march to Mecklenburg in April and May 1945.

== Post-war return to politics ==
Henßler returned to political activities after the end of the Second World War, becoming chairman of the SPD's western Westphalia district in 1945. From 1946 to 1953, he was chairman of the SPD faction in the state Landtag of North Rhine-Westphalia and, at the same time, was the Oberbürgermeister (mayor) of Dortmund. He was elected to the Bundestag in 1949. He was elected to the European Parliament from 1952 to 1953. In 1953, Henßler declined to again run for the Bundestag and he turned down the position of second federal chairman of the SPD for reasons of health. He collapsed at a conference in November 1953 and died in Witten on 4 December 1953.

== Sources ==
- Biography at Friedrich-Ebert-Stiftung
- Fritz Henßler at Landtag-NRW
