= 1990 North Rhine-Westphalia state election =

German state election

← 1985	13 May 1990	1995 →

All 237 seats in the Landtag of North Rhine-Westphalia, including 36 overhang and leveling seats 119 seats needed for a majority
- Turnout: 9,353,712 (71.8% ▼0.5 pp)
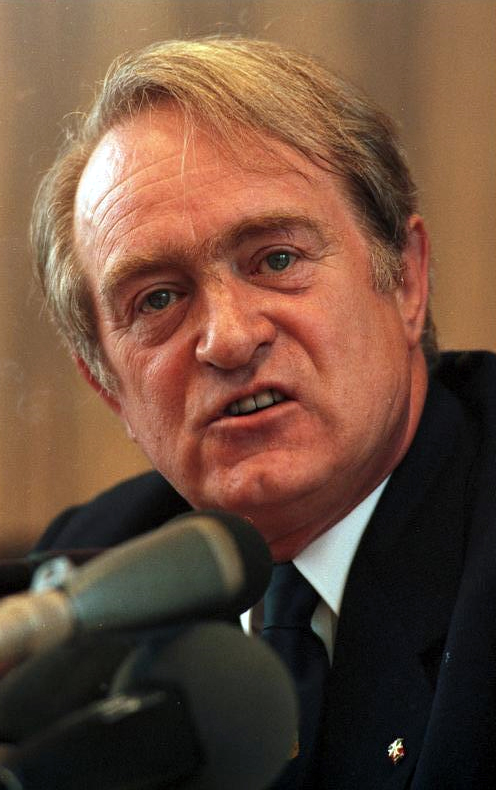

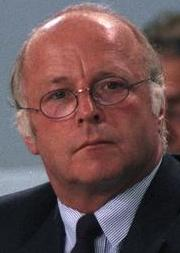

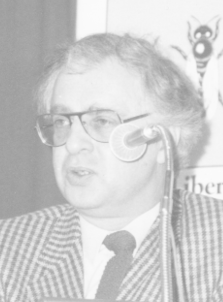

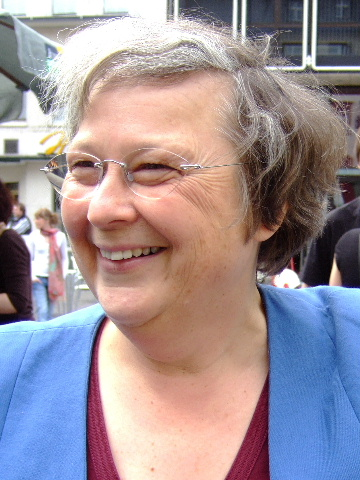
	First party	Second party
Candidate	Johannes Rau	Norbert Blüm
Party	SPD	CDU
Last election	125 seats, 52.1%	88 seats, 36.5%
Seats won	122	89
Seat change	▼3	▲1
Popular vote	4,644,431	3,409,953
Percentage	50.0%	36.7%
Swing	▼2.2 pp	▲0.2 pp
	Third party	Fourth party
Candidate	Achim Rohde	Bärbel Höhn
Party	FDP	Greens
Last election	14 seats, 6.0%	0 seats, 4.6%
Seats won	14	12
Seat change	0	▲12
Popular vote	535,656	469,098
Percentage	5.8%	5.0%
Swing	▼0.2 pp	▲0.5 pp
- Results for the single-member constituencies.
Government before election
Third Rau cabinet
SPD
Government after election
Fourth Rau cabinet
SPD

The 1990 North Rhine-Westphalia state election was held on 13 May 1990 to elect the 11th Landtag of North Rhine-Westphalia. The outgoing government was a majority of the Social Democratic Party (SPD), led by Minister-President Johannes Rau.

The SPD successfully retained their parliamentary majority with minor losses, taking slightly under 50% of the vote. The opposition Christian Democratic Union (CDU) failed to recover from their 1985 losses, recording 36.7%; the Free Democratic Party (FDP) likewise remained essentially level on 6% and 14 seats. The Greens narrowly passed the 5% electoral threshold and entered the Landtag for the first time with 12 seats. The margin of the SPD's victory saw them win 121 of the 151 single-member constituencies, resulting in overhang and leveling seats boosting the Landtag to 237 members. In February 1992, it gained two more due to an election review which reversed the result in the Märkischer Kreis IV constituency, resulting in an additional overhang seat for the SPD and a new leveling seat for the CDU.

== Electoral system ==
The Landtag was elected via mixed-member proportional representation. 151 members were elected in single-member constituencies via first-past-the-post voting, and fifty then allocated using compensatory proportional representation. A single ballot was used for both. The minimum size of the Landtag was 201 members, but if overhang seats were present, proportional leveling seats were added to ensure proportionality. An electoral threshold of 5% of valid votes is applied to the Landtag; parties that fall below this threshold are ineligible to receive seats.

== Background ==
In the previous election held on 12 May 1985, the SPD won a landslide victory, expanding their majority in the Landtag with 52.1% of votes while the CDU fell to 36.5% – a record high and low, respectively. The FDP returned to the Landtag with 6% and took 14 seats. Due to the magnitude of the SPD's victory, they took 125 of the 151 constituencies, necessitating the addition of leveling seats which boosted the Landtag to 227 members. The SPD again formed government alone and Johannes Rau continued as Minister-President.

== Parties ==
The table below lists parties represented in the 10th Landtag of North Rhine-Westphalia.

Name		Ideology	Lead candidate	1985 result	
Name		Ideology	Lead candidate	Votes (%)	Seats
SPD	Social Democratic Party of Germany; Sozialdemokratische Partei Deutschlands	Social democracy	Johannes Rau	52.1%	125 / 227
CDU	Christian Democratic Union of Germany; Christlich Demokratische Union Deutschlands	Christian democracy	Norbert Blüm	36.5%	88 / 227
FDP	Free Democratic Party; Freie Demokratische Partei	Classical liberalism	Achim Rohde	6.0%	14 / 227

== Results ==
Party	Votes	%	+/–	Seats			
Party	Votes	%	+/–	Con.	List	Total	+/–
Social Democratic Party (SPD)	4,644,431	49.98	–2.16	121	1	122	–3
Christian Democratic Union (CDU)	3,409,953	36.70	+0.16	30	59	89	+1
Free Democratic Party (FDP)	535,656	5.76	–0.20	0	14	14	±0
The Greens (GRÜNE)	469,098	5.05	+0.50	0	12	12	+12
The Republicans (REP)	171,867	1.85	New	0	0	0	New
Ecological Democratic Party (ÖDP)	46,650	0.50	New	0	0	0	New
National Democratic Party (NPD)	3,370	0.04	New	0	0	0	New
German Communist Party (DKP)	2,376	0.03	New	0	0	0	New
Patriots for Germany (Patrioten)	1,742	0.02	New	0	0	0	New
Christian Centre (CM)	1,161	0.01	New	0	0	0	New
Centre Party (ZENTRUM)	717	0.01	–0.03	0	0	0	±0
Family Party of Germany (FAMILIE)	210	0.00	±0.00	0	0	0	±0
Social Reform Party (SRP)	202	0.00	New	0	0	0	New
Free German Workers' Party (FAP)	56	0.00	–0.01	0	0	0	±0
Independents	4,485	0.05	+0.04	0	–	0	±0
Total	9,291,974	100.00	–	151	86	237	+10
Valid votes	9,291,974	99.34					
Invalid/blank votes	61,738	0.66					
Total votes	9,353,712	100.00					
Registered voters/turnout	13,036,004	71.75					
