= 1985 North Rhine-Westphalia state election =

German state election

← 1980	12 May 1985	1990 →

All 227 seats in the Landtag of North Rhine-Westphalia, including 26 overhang and leveling seats 114 seats needed for a majority
- Turnout: 9,560,681 (75.2% ▼4.8 pp)
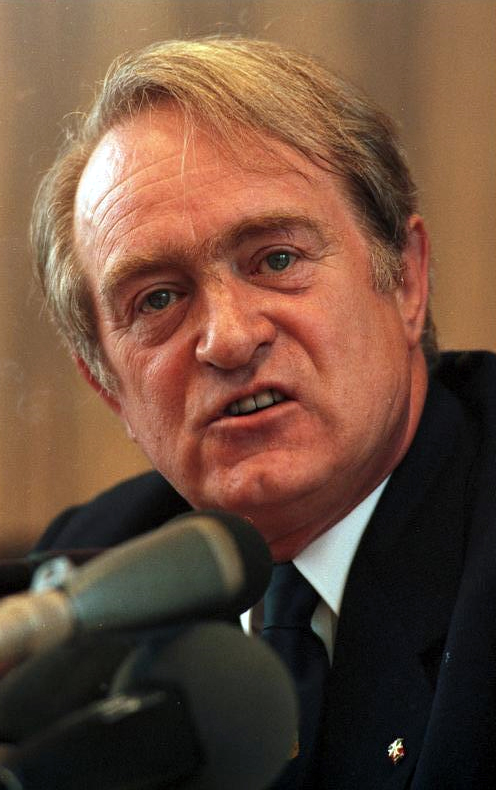

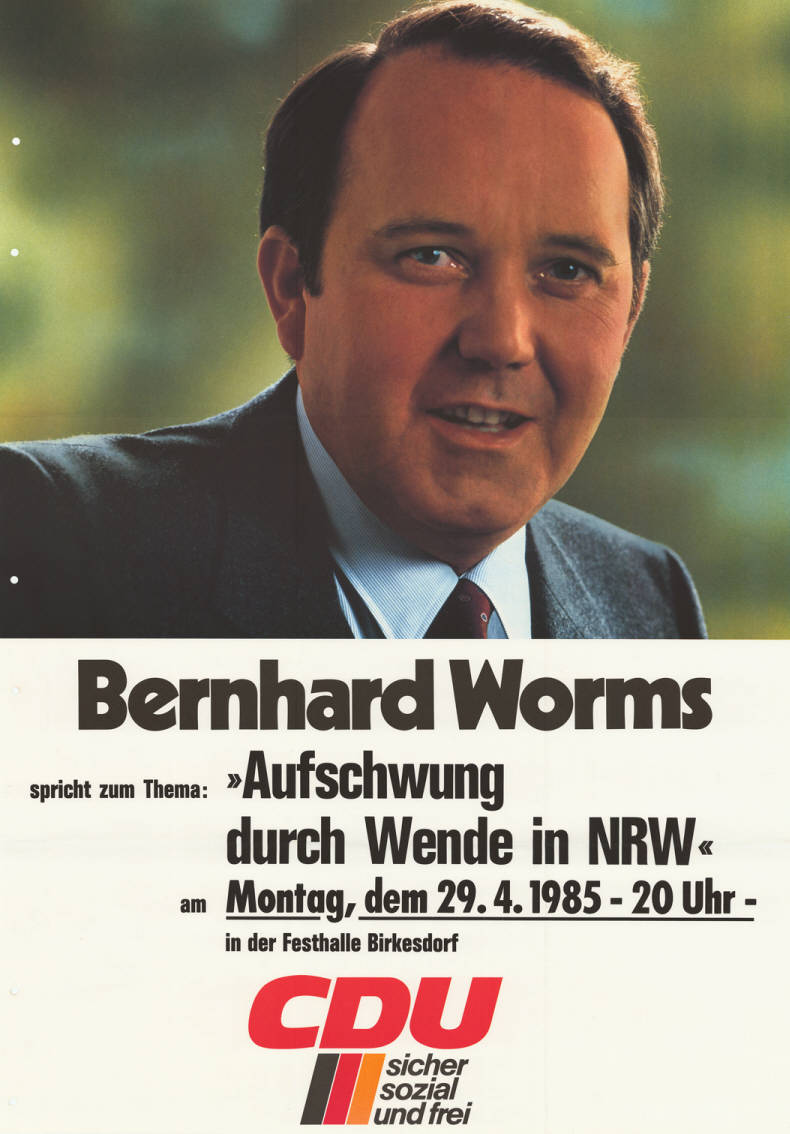

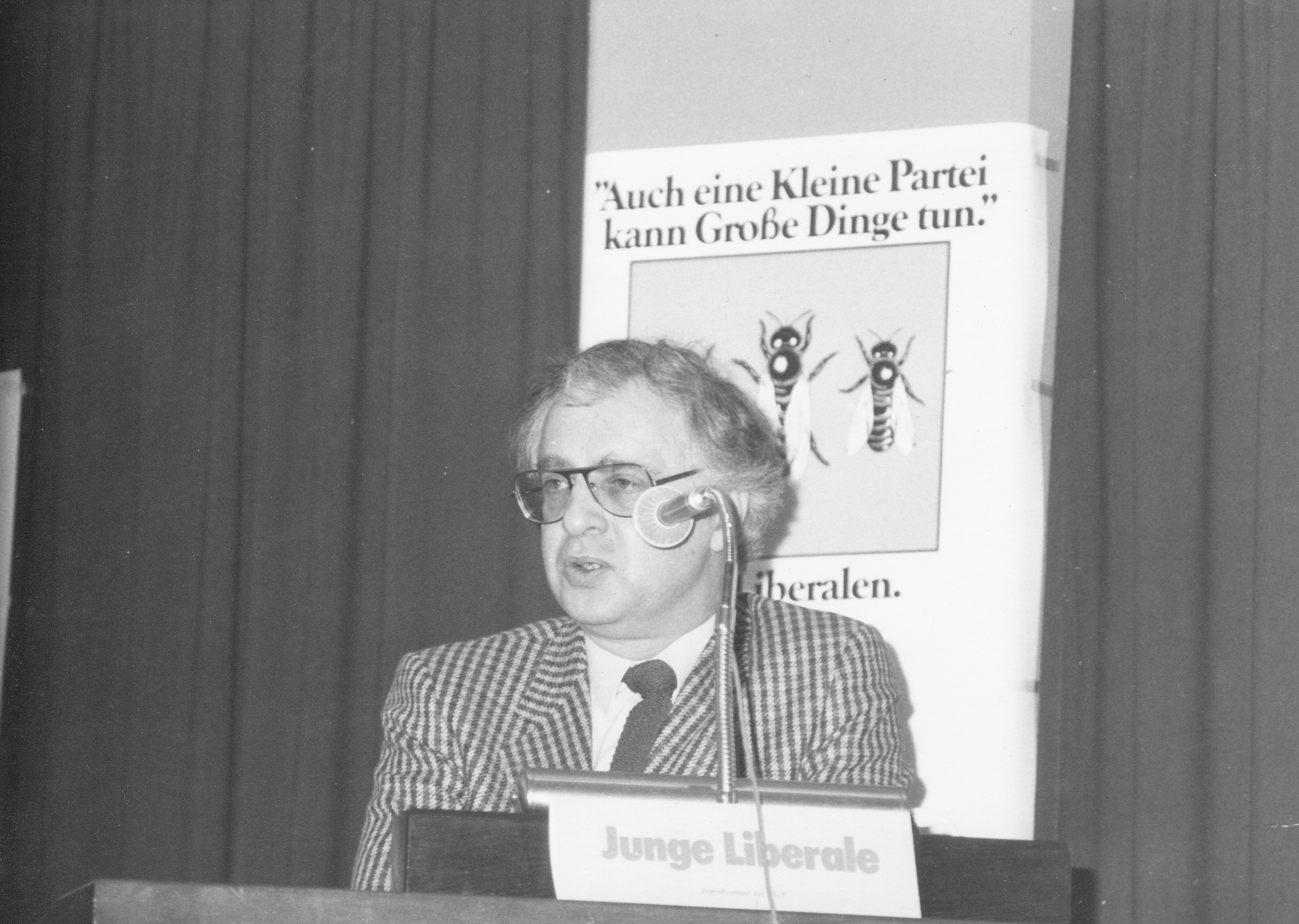
	First party	Second party	Third party
Candidate	Johannes Rau	Bernhard Worms	Achim Rohde
Party	SPD	CDU	FDP
Last election	106 seats, 48.4%	95 seats, 43.2%	0 seats, 4.98%
Seats won	125	88	14
Seat change	▲19	▼7	▲14
Popular vote	4,942,346	3,463,656	565,413
Percentage	52.1%	36.5%	6.0%
Swing	▲3.7 pp	▼6.7 pp	▲1.0 pp
- Results for the single-member constituencies.
Government before election
Second Rau cabinet
SPD
Government after election
Third Rau cabinet
SPD

The 1985 North Rhine-Westphalia state election was held on 12 May 1985 to elect the 10th Landtag of North Rhine-Westphalia. The outgoing government was a majority of the Social Democratic Party (SPD), led by Minister-President Johannes Rau.

The SPD won re-election in a landslide, recording their best-ever result with 52.1% of votes. The opposition Christian Democratic Union (CDU) suffered their worst result up until this point with 36.5%. The SPD's victory came despite an increase in support for minor parties: the Free Democratic Party (FDP) returned to the Landtag with 6% and 14 seats, while The Greens narrowly fell short with 4.6% of votes. The magnitude of the SPD's victory saw them win 125 of the 151 single-member constituencies, resulting in a number of leveling seats being added to ensure proportionality, boosting the Landtag to 227 seats.

== Electoral system ==
The Landtag was elected via mixed-member proportional representation. 151 members were elected in single-member constituencies via first-past-the-post voting, and fifty then allocated using compensatory proportional representation. A single ballot was used for both. The minimum size of the Landtag was 201 members, but if overhang seats were present, proportional leveling seats were added to ensure proportionality. An electoral threshold of 5% of valid votes is applied to the Landtag; parties that fall below this threshold are ineligible to receive seats.

== Background ==
In the previous election held on 11 May 1980, the SPD recorded a clear victory, winning an outright majority in the Landtag with 48.4% of votes while the CDU declined to 43.2%. The FDP fell narrowly short of the 5% threshold and lost their seats. The SPD formed government alone and Johannes Rau continued as Minister-President.

== Parties ==
The table below lists parties represented in the 9th Landtag of North Rhine-Westphalia.

Name		Ideology	Lead candidate	1980 result	
Name		Ideology	Lead candidate	Votes (%)	Seats
SPD	Social Democratic Party of Germany; Sozialdemokratische Partei Deutschlands	Social democracy	Johannes Rau	48.4%	106 / 201
CDU	Christian Democratic Union of Germany; Christlich Demokratische Union Deutschlands	Christian democracy	Bernhard Worms	43.2%	95 / 201

== Results ==
Party	Votes	%	+/–	Seats			
Party	Votes	%	+/–	Con.	List	Total	+/–
Social Democratic Party (SPD)	4,942,346	52.14	+3.70	125	0	125	+19
Christian Democratic Union (CDU)	3,463,656	36.54	–6.65	26	62	88	–7
Free Democratic Party (FDP)	565,413	5.96	+0.98	0	14	14	+14
The Greens (GRÜNE)	431,371	4.55	+1.58	0	0	0	±0
The Peace List (Frieden)	61,818	0.65	New	0	0	0	New
European Labour Party (EAP)	3,701	0.04	+0.03	0	0	0	±0
Centre Party (ZENTRUM)	3,366	0.04	+0.04	0	0	0	±0
Marxist–Leninist Party of Germany	3,338	0.04	New	0	0	0	New
Free German Workers' Party (FAP)	929	0.01	New	0	0	0	New
The Responsible Citizens (Mündige Bürger)	925	0.01	New	0	0	0	New
Communist Party of Germany/M–L	434	0.00	New	0	0	0	New
Pensioners' Party (ASD)	400	0.00	New	0	0	0	New
Family Party of Germany (FAMILIE)	375	0.00	New	0	0	0	New
European Federalist Party (EFP)	284	0.00	±0.00	0	0	0	±0
Humanist Party (HP)	280	0.00	New	0	0	0	New
Liberal Democrats (LD)	199	0.00	New	0	0	0	New
League of Socialist Workers (BSA)	51	0.00	New	0	0	0	New
Independents	554	0.01	+0.01	0	–	0	±0
Total	9,479,440	100.00	–	151	76	227	+26
Valid votes	9,479,440	99.15					
Invalid/blank votes	81,241	0.85					
Total votes	9,560,681	100.00					
Registered voters/turnout	12,705,763	75.25					
