= Franz Meyers =

German politician

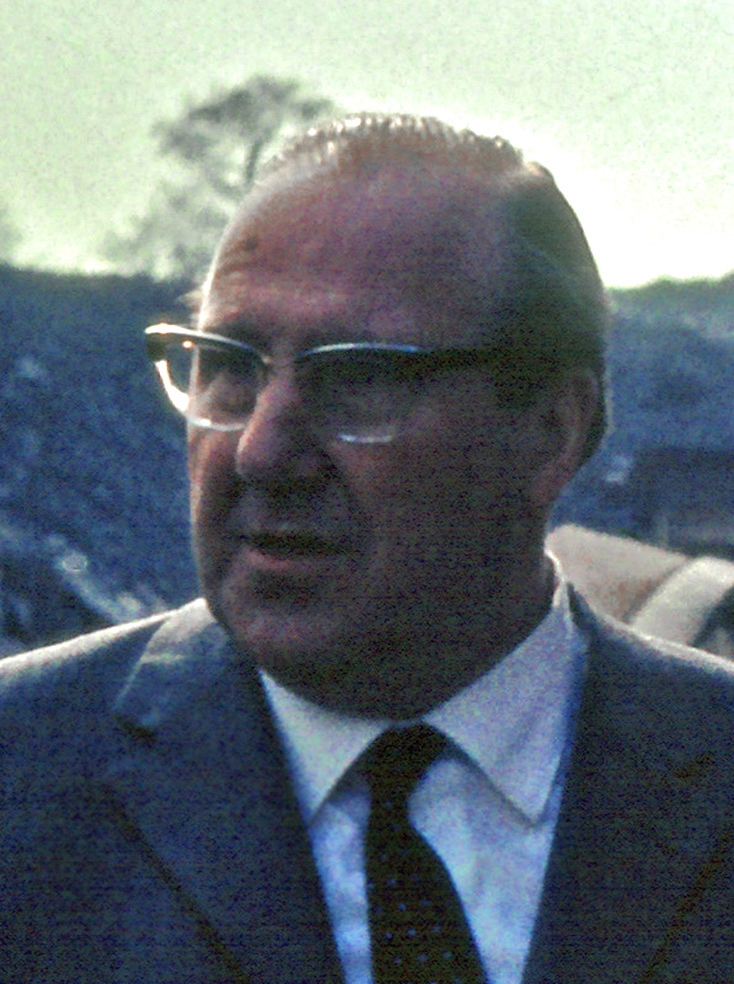
- Meyers in 1965

Minister-President of North Rhine-Westphalia
- In office 21 July 1958 – 8 December 1966
- Preceded by: Fritz Steinhoff
- Succeeded by: Heinz Kühn

President of the Bundesrat
- In office 1 November 1960 – 31 October 1961
- Preceded by: Franz-Josef Röder
- Succeeded by: Hans Ehard
Ministerial offices
Minister for the Interior of North Rhine-Westphalia
In office 1 December 1966 – 8 December 1966
Minister-President	Himself
Preceded by	Willi Weyer
Succeeded by	Willi Weyer
In office 25 May 1952 – 28 February 1956
Minister-President	Karl Arnold
Preceded by	Adolf Flecken
Succeeded by	Hubert Biernat
Minister for Justice of North Rhine-Westphalia
In office 25 July 1966 – 5 October 1966
Minister-President	Himself
Preceded by	Artur Sträter
Succeeded by	Friedrich Vogel
Minister for Federal Affairs of North Rhine-Westphalia
In office 24 July 1958 – 12 October 1959
Minister-President	Himself
Preceded by	Karl Siemsen
Succeeded by	Johann Ernst
Parliamentary offices
Member of the; Landtag of North Rhine-Westphalia
In office 5 July 1950 – 26 July 1970
Preceded by	Wilhelm Elfes
Succeeded by	Michael Funken
Constituency	Mönchengladbach-Süd (1950–1958); Mönchengladbach II (1958–1966); Mönchengladbach I (1966–1970)
Member of the Bundestag; for Aachen-Stadt
In office 15 October 1957 – 4 September 1958
Preceded by	Helene Weber
Succeeded by	Hermann A. Eplée

Personal details
- Born: Franz Josef Heinrich Georg Meyers; 31 July 1908 Mönchengladbach, Germany
- Died: 27 January 2002 (aged 93) Mönchengladbach, Germany
- Party: Christian Democratic Union
- Spouse: Alberte Mertens (m. 1936; died 1982)
- Education: University of Freiburg; University of Cologne

Franz Josef Heinrich Georg Meyers (31 July 1908 – 27 January 2002) was a German politician who served as the 4th Minister President of North Rhine-Westphalia from 21 July 1958 to 8 December 1966. A member of the Christian Democratic Union (CDU), he had previously served as mayor of Mönchengladbach in 1952 and as Minister of the Interior of North Rhine-Westphalia from 1952 to 1956.

He was born and died in Mönchengladbach.
