= 1970 North Rhine-Westphalia state election =

German state election

- 14 June 1970

All 200 seats in the Landtag of North Rhine-Westphalia 101 seats needed for a majority
- Turnout: 8,739,940 (73.5% ▼3.0 pp)
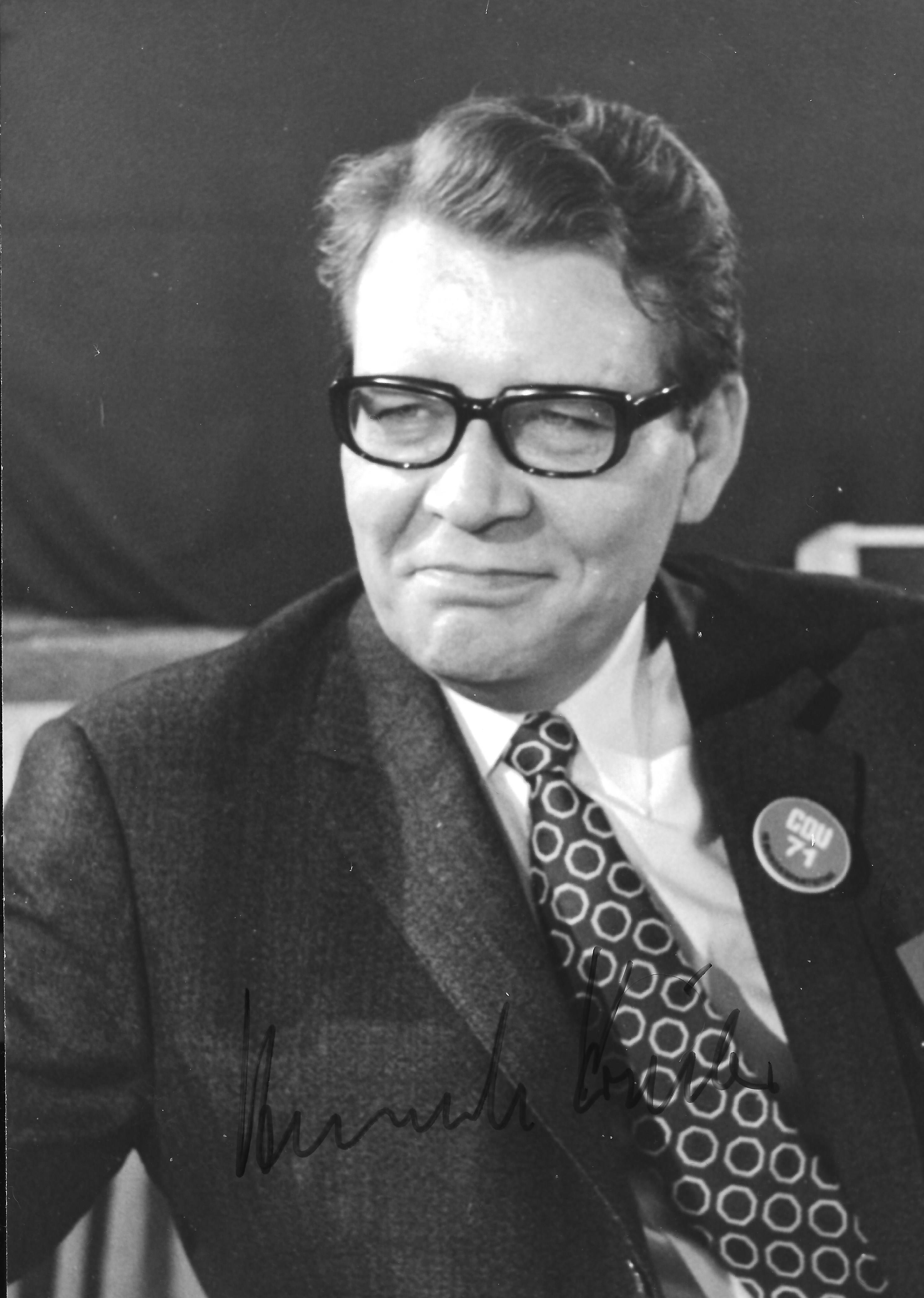

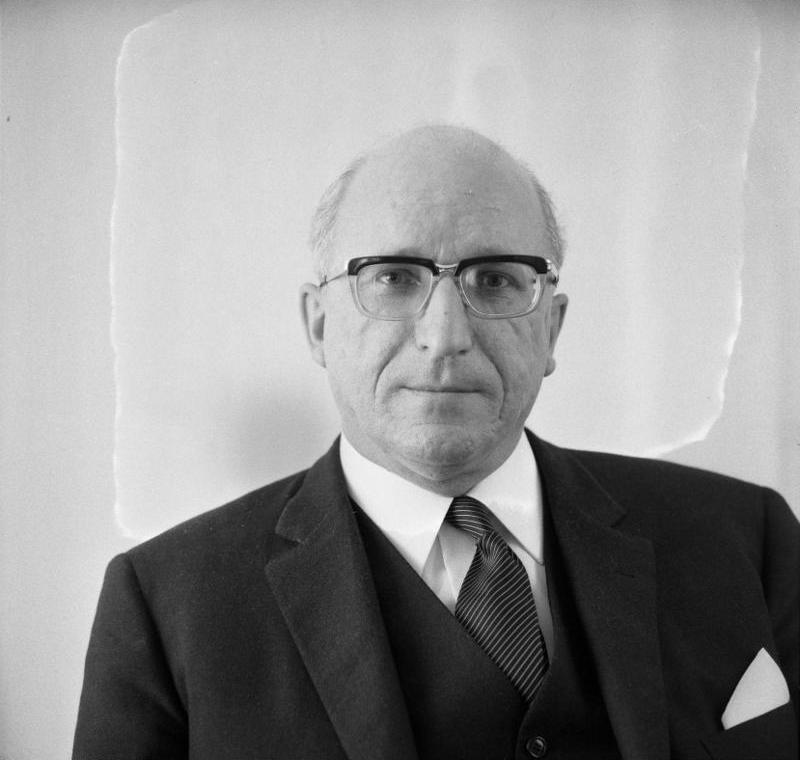

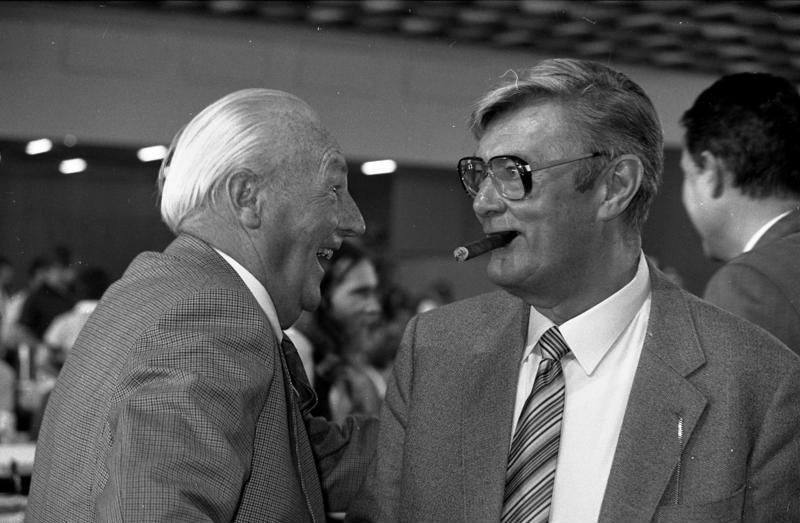
	First party	Second party	Third party
Candidate	Heinrich Köppler	Heinz Kühn	Willi Weyer
Party	CDU	SPD	FDP
Last election	86 seats, 42.8%	99 seats, 49.5%	15 seats, 7.4%
Seats won	95	94	11
Seat change	▲9	▼5	▼4
Popular vote	4,020,186	3,996,808	478,420
Percentage	46.3%	46.1%	5.5%
Swing	▲3.5 pp	▼3.4 pp	▼1.9 pp
- Results for the single-member constituencies.
Government before election
First Kühn cabinet
SPD–FDP
Government after election
Second Kühn cabinet
SPD–FDP

The 1970 North Rhine-Westphalia state election was held on 14 June 1970 to elect the 7th Landtag of North Rhine-Westphalia. The outgoing government was a coalition of the Social Democratic Party (SPD) and Free Democratic Party (FDP) led by Minister-President Heinz Kühn.

The opposition Christian Democratic Union (CDU) returned as the largest party after falling to second in 1966, winning a narrow plurality of 46.3%, with a lead of 0.2% and one seat over the SPD. The FDP suffered losses and declined to 5.5%. Overall, the incumbent coalition retained a reduced majority of 105 seats. However, a number of FDP deputies opposed to cooperation with the SPD refused to vote for Kühn in the investiture vote on 28 July; he was re-elected with the minimum majority of 101 votes out of 200. There were 95 votes for CDU leader Heinrich Köppler and four abstentions. In October, three members of the FDP faction defected to the new party National Liberal Action, leaving the government with a narrow majority of 102 seats. Nonetheless, it completed its full term.

== Electoral system ==
The Landtag was elected via mixed-member proportional representation. 150 members were elected in single-member constituencies via first-past-the-post voting, and fifty were then allocated using compensatory proportional representation. A single ballot was used for both. An electoral threshold of 5% of valid votes is applied to the Landtag; parties below this threshold are ineligible to receive seats.

== Background ==
In the previous election held on 10 July 1966, the SPD became the largest party for the first time in the state, coming just short of a majority with 49.5% and 99 seats. The CDU was reduced to second place with 43%, and the FDP improved to 7.4%. The incumbent CDU–FDP coalition was renewed, but collapsed in November after a grand coalition took power federally. The FDP subsequently agreed to a coalition with the SPD, and Heinz Kühn was elected Minister-President by the Landtag.

== Parties ==
The table below lists parties represented in the 6th Landtag of North Rhine-Westphalia.

Name		Ideology	Lead candidate	1966 result	
Name		Ideology	Lead candidate	Votes (%)	Seats
SPD	Social Democratic Party of Germany; Sozialdemokratische Partei Deutschlands	Social democracy	Heinz Kühn	49.5%	99 / 200
CDU	Christian Democratic Union of Germany; Christlich Demokratische Union Deutschlands	Christian democracy	Heinrich Köppler	42.8%	86 / 200
FDP	Free Democratic Party; Freie Demokratische Partei	Classical liberalism	Willi Weyer	7.4%	15 / 200

== Results ==
Party	Votes	%	+/–	Seats			
Party	Votes	%	+/–	Con.	List	Total	+/–
Christian Democratic Union (CDU)	4,020,186	46.33	+3.57	65	30	95	+9
Social Democratic Party (SPD)	3,996,808	46.06	–3.42	85	9	94	–5
Free Democratic Party (FDP)	478,420	5.51	–1.91	0	11	11	–4
National Democratic Party (NPD)	94,043	1.08	New	0	0	0	New
German Communist Party (DKP)	76,964	0.89	New	0	0	0	New
Centre Party (ZENTRUM)	9,902	0.11	–0.09	0	0	0	±0
Independent Workers' Party (UAP)	1,504	0.02	–0.02	0	0	0	±0
Total	8,677,827	100.00	–	150	50	200	±0
Valid votes	8,677,827	99.29					
Invalid/blank votes	62,113	0.71					
Total votes	8,739,940	100.00					
Registered voters/turnout	11,890,609	73.50					
