= Fritz Steinhoff =

German politician (1897–1969)

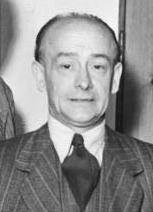
- Steinhoff in 1949

Minister President of North Rhine-Westphalia
- In office 20 February 1956 – 21 July 1958
- President: Theodor Heuss
- Chancellor: Konrad Adenauer
- Preceded by: Karl Arnold
- Succeeded by: Franz Meyers
- Constituency: Hagen

Member of the Bundestag for Hagen
- In office 1961–1969
- Preceded by: Luise Rehling
- Succeeded by: Lothar Wrede

Personal details
- Born: 23 November 1897 Wickede, Dortmund
- Died: 22 October 1969 (aged 71)
- Party: Social Democratic Party of Germany (SDP)

Fritz Steinhoff (23 November 1897 – 22 October 1969) was a German politician of the SPD. He was the third Minister President of the state of North Rhine-Westphalia from 1956 to 1958.

== Early life ==
Steinhoff was born in 1897 in a miner's family and grew up in Unna. He became a miner at the age of seventeen. Steinhoff was drafted into the Navy in 1917 and served on a torpedo boat until 1919. He returned to his job as a miner and joined the SPD. He belonged to a nationalistic section of the Young Socialists in the SPD. In 1922, he went to the European Academy of Work in the University of Frankfurt to hear lectures about business and politics from lectures such as Franz Oppenheimer. Due to unemployment, Steinhoff went to Berlin, where he worked and attended Deutsche Hochschule für Politik.

== Career ==
In 1926 he was a volunteer at the SPD party newspaper, Westfälische Allgemeine Volkszeitung (WAVZ), in Dortmund. A year later Steinhoff became managing director of newspaper distribution, and became the party secretary in Hagen. In the 1929 local elections, the SPD reached a majority, and Steinhoff was an honorary magistrate for Youth Sport Care and city gardening.

=== 1933–1945 ===
After the seizure of power by the Nazi Party, Steinhoff was arrested several times for vigorously opposing the party. He later worked at a stove and oven cleaning business from 1937 until his sentence in 1938, where Steinhoff was sentenced to three years in prison, due to smuggling the Vorwärts into Germany in 1934, after the banning of the newspaper in 1933.

He worked again as a laborer after his release in 1941. After the assassination attempt on 20 July 1944, Steinhoff was arrested again and was sent to the Sachsenhausen concentration camp. In 1945, Steinhoff was in a death march, being liberated by American troops in Mecklenburg.

=== Rise in the SPD: 1945–1957 ===
After World War II, Steinhoff became a city councilor for Iserlohn. In 1946 he was the mayor of Hagen. Despite the CDU having a majority in the city council after the local elections, Steinhoff retained his office until 1956. He was a member of the first Landtag of North Rhine-Westphalia, of which he was the Minister of Reconstruction in the cabinet of Karl Arnold.

In 1950, Steinhoff became the Vice Chairman of the SPD group in the state parliament, and after the death of Fritz Henßlers in 1953, took over as the chairman, leading the party into the 1954 election, before losing to a coalition between the CDU and the FDP.

=== Social-liberal coalition: 1956–1958 ===
After a conflict between the CDU/CSU and the FDP, the FDP turned on the CDU in North Rhine-Westphalia. Steinhoff was using the "Young Turks" in the FDP successfully in a motion of no confidence put against Arnold.

The social-liberal coalition was dependent on support from the center, so the coalition made several reforms, including in the fields of research of nuclear energy and the reform of municipal financial compensation.

In the parliamentary election of 1958, the SPD were able to win votes alongside the FDP and the center, but suffered electoral losses. The CDU won an absolute majority and Franz Meyers became Minister President.

=== Bundestag:1958–1965 ===
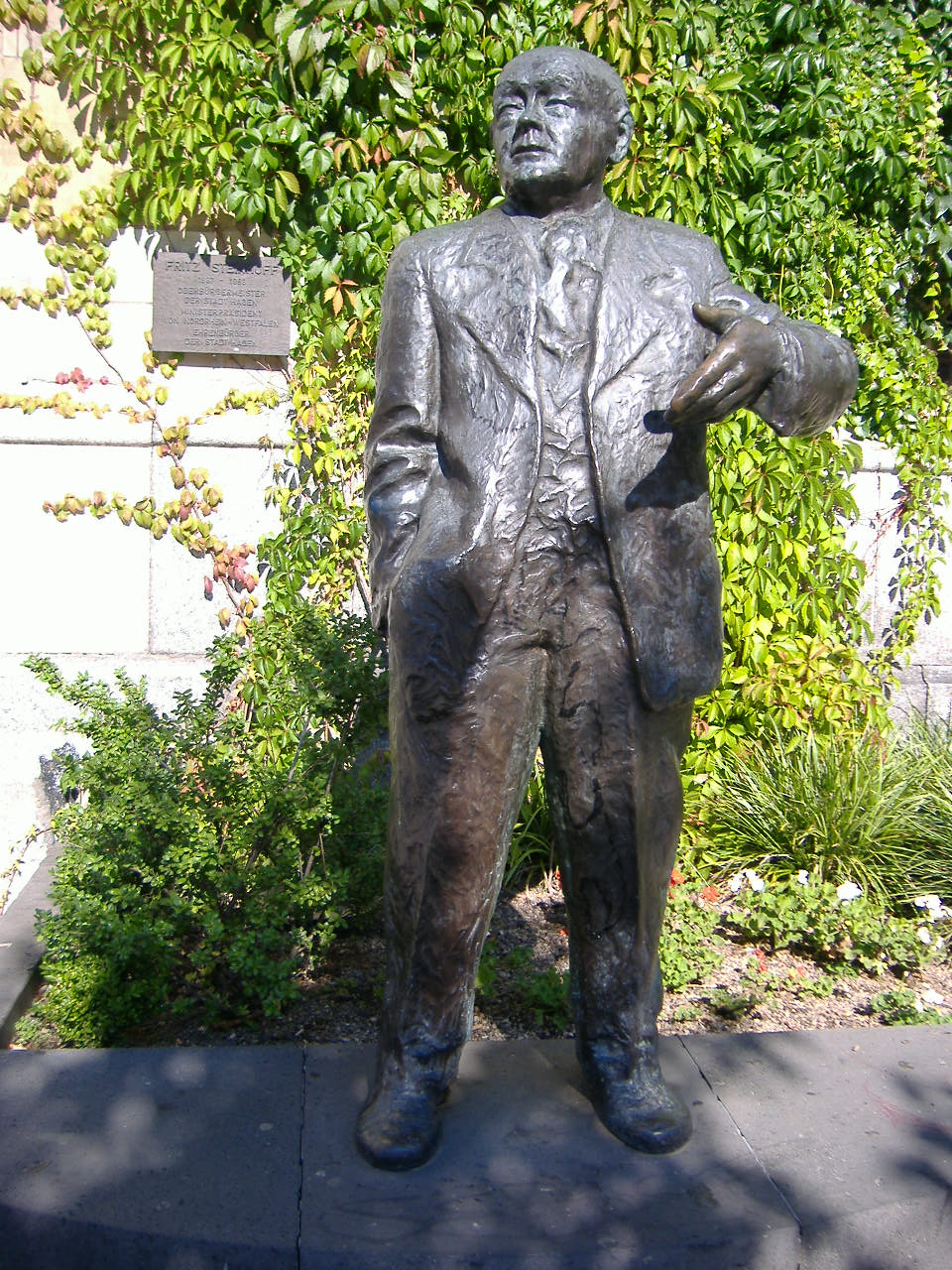
Monument to Fritz Steinhoff at Friedrich-Ebert-Platz in Hagen

Steinhoff was the chairman of the Ruhr Regional Association in 1958. In 1961, he won the direct mandate of the constituency of Hagen, and moved into the Bundestag. He defended the mandate in 1965 and remained in office until his death. Steinhoff was also Mayor of Hagen from 1963 until 1964.

== Honours ==
The city of Hagen gave Steinhoff honorary citizenship in 1967. The Fritz-Steinhoff comprehensive school was named after Steinhoff, and in 1989, a memorium was inaugurated in his honour.
