= Rudolf Amelunxen =

German politician (1888–1969)

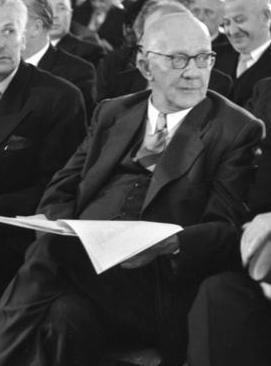
- Amelunxen in 1945

Minister President of North Rhine-Westphalia
- In office 23 August 1946 – 17 June 1947
- Preceded by: Position established
- Succeeded by: Karl Arnold

Regierungspräsident of North Rhine-Westphalia
- In office 1926–1932

Personal details
- Born: 30 June 1888 Cologne, German Empire
- Died: 21 April 1969 (aged 80) Grafschaft Abbey, North Rhine-Westphalia, West Germany
- Party: Zentrum

Rudolf Amelunxen (30 June 1888 – 21 April 1969) was a German politician of the Zentrum and the 1st Minister President of North Rhine-Westphalia between 23 August 1946 and 17 June 1947. He was born in Cologne and died on 21 April 1969 in Grafschaft Abbey, North Rhine-Westphalia.

From 1926 to 1932 he was the regional president of the Westphalian Münster Region, but was furloughed after the 1932 Prussian Coup d'état.

On 5 July 1945, the British military government appointed him upper president of the Province of Westphalia, an office he held until Westphalia was merged with the northern portion of the former Rhine province to form North Rhine-Westphalia in 1946. In the first West German presidential election in 1949, held indirectly with delegates, Amelunxen was his party's candidate for president. He received 3.7% of the vote in the final round.
