= Heinz Kühn =

German politician and Minister-President of North Rhine-Westphalia (1966-1978)

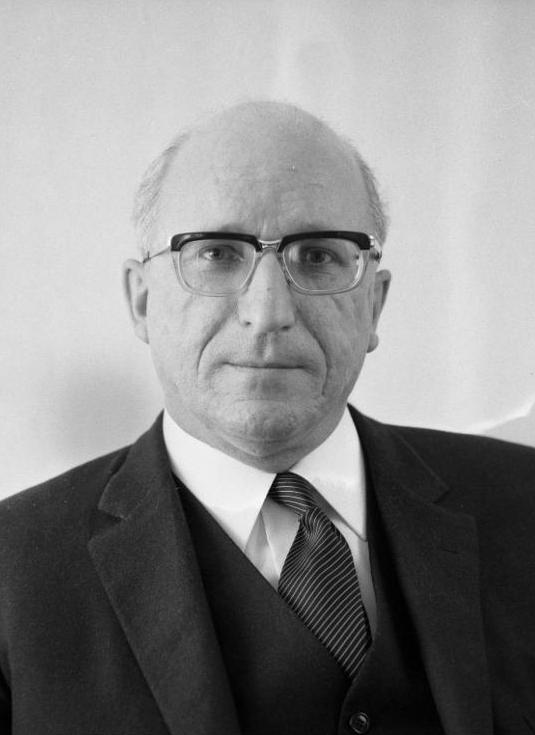
- Heinz Kühn, 1966

Minister president of North Rhine-Westphalia
- In office 8 December 1966 – 20 September 1978
- Preceded by: Franz Meyers
- Succeeded by: Johannes Rau

President of the Bundesrat
- In office 1 November 1971 – 31 October 1972
- Preceded by: Hans Koschnick
- Succeeded by: Alfons Goppel

Personal details
- Born: 18 February 1912
- Died: 12 March 1992 (aged 80)
- Party: Social Democratic Party of Germany

Heinz Kühn (18 February 1912 – 12 March 1992) was a German Social Democratic Party (SPD) politician and the 5th Minister President of North Rhine-Westphalia from 8 December 1966 to 20 September 1978. He was born and died in Cologne.
