= Thomas Kufen =

German politician

Thomas Markus Kufen
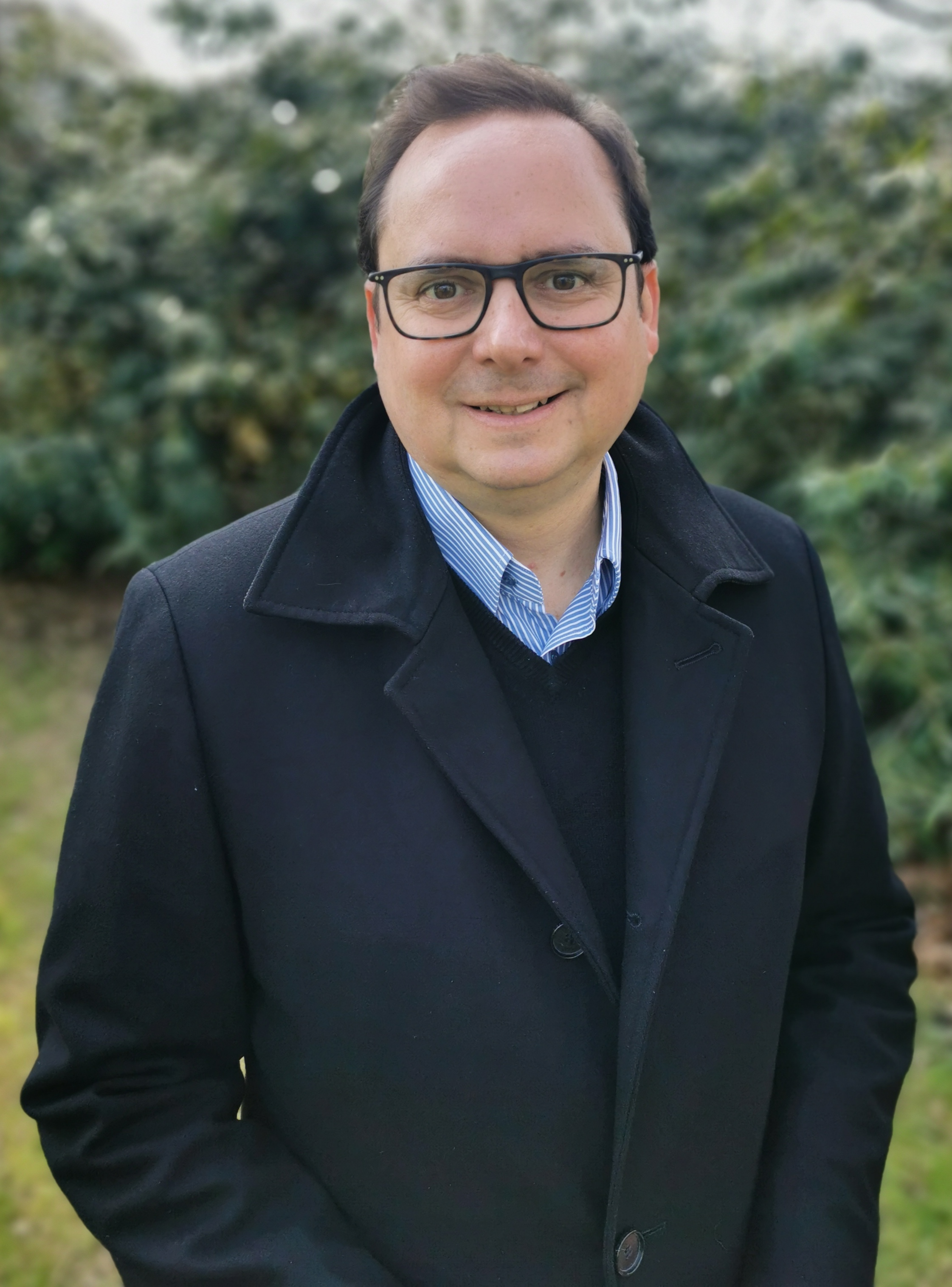
- Kufen in 2021

Lord Mayor of Essen
- Incumbent
- Assumed office 21 October 2015

Member of the Landtag of North Rhine-Westphalia
- In office 2012–2015
- In office 2000–2005

Personal details
- Born: 5 August 1973 (age 53) Essen, West Germany (now Germany)
- Party: Christian Democratic Union (CDU)
- Domestic partner: David Lüngen
- Website: thomas-kufen.de (German)

Thomas Markus Kufen (born 5 August 1973, in Essen) is a German politician of the Christian Democratic Union (CDU).

== Life ==
Kufen was a member of the Landtag of North Rhine-Westphalia from 2000 to 2005 and again from 2012 until 21 October 2015. Between 2005 and 2010, he served as Commissioner for Integration in the state government of Minister-President Jürgen Rüttgers.

Since 2015 Kufen has been Lord mayor of German city Essen.

Kufen has also been part of the CDU leadership in North Rhine-Westphalia under party chairman Armin Laschet since 2014. Following the 2017 state elections in North Rhine-Westphalia, Kufen was part of Laschet's team in the negotiations with the Free Democrats (FDP) on a coalition agreement. He served in the working group on municipal policy.

On the national level, Kufen was a CDU delegate to the Federal Convention for the purpose of electing the President of Germany in 2004 and 2017.

== Other activities (selection) ==
=== Corporate boards ===
- NRW.Bank, Member of the Advisory Board (since 2022)
- RWE, Member of the Supervisory Board (since 2021)
- Essen/Mülheim Airport, Ex-Officio Member of the Supervisory Board
- Essen Marketing GmbH (EMG), Ex-Officio Chairman of the Supervisory Board
- Essener Versorgungs- und Verkehrsgesellschaft, Ex-Officio Chairman of the Supervisory Board
- Messe Essen, Ex-Officio Chairman of the Supervisory Board
- RAG-Stiftung, Member of the Board of Trustees
- RWE Power AG, Ex-Officio Member of the Supervisory Board
- Sparkasse Essen, Ex-Officio Chairman of the Supervisory Board

=== Non-profits ===
- Center for Turkish Studies, University of Duisburg-Essen, Member of the Board of Trustees
- European Centre for Creative Economy (ECCE), Ex-Officio Member of the Board of Trustees
- Johannes-Rau-Forschungsgemeinschaft (JRF), Member of the Board of Trustees
- Johanniter-Unfall-Hilfe (JUH), Member of the Advisory Board
- Museum Folkwang, Ex-Officio Member of the Board of Trustees
- Zollverein Coal Mine Industrial Complex, Ex-Officio Member of the Board of Trustees

== Political positions ==
Ahead of the Christian Democrats’ leadership election in 2021, Kufen publicly endorsed Armin Laschet to succeed Annegret Kramp-Karrenbauer as the party’s chair.

== Personal life ==
Kufen is since 2015 married with fellow politician David Lüngen. In December 2017, he officiated the wedding of Jens Spahn and Daniel Funke at Borbeck Palace in Essen.

== Representation in theater and media milleu ==
His Lordship Thomas Kufen, Lord Mayor of the city of Essen, makes a speech at the ceremony of Aalto-Bühnenpreis Award to actor Christopher Heisler. (18.06.2026. Grillo-Theater Essen. Essen, FRG.) Effective from January 26th, 2026 Thomas Kufen serves as Chairperson of the Supervisory Board of the Essen Theatre and Philharmonic (TUP).

18.06.2026. Grillo-Theater Essen
