= Peer Steinbrück =

German politician (born 1947)

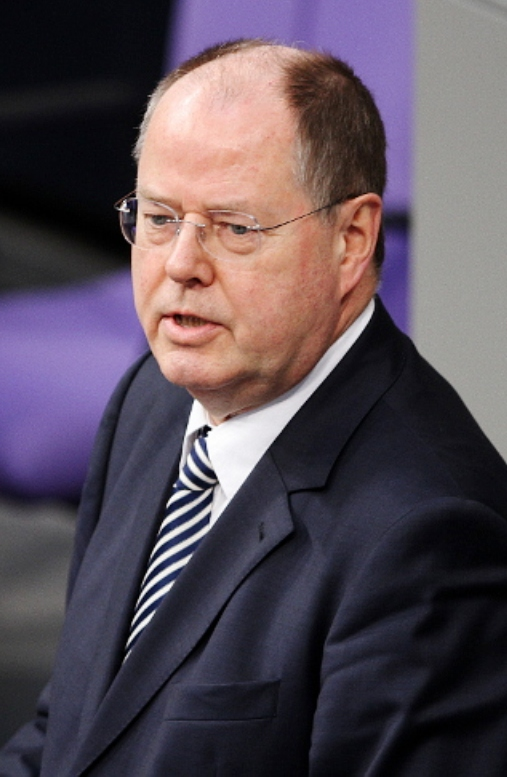
- Steinbrück in 2013

Minister of Finance
- In office 22 November 2005 – 28 October 2009
- Chancellor: Angela Merkel
- Preceded by: Hans Eichel
- Succeeded by: Wolfgang Schäuble

Minister-President of North Rhine-Westphalia
- In office 6 November 2002 – 22 June 2005
- Deputy: Michael Vesper
- Preceded by: Wolfgang Clement
- Succeeded by: Jürgen Rüttgers

Deputy Leader of the Social Democratic Party
- In office 15 November 2005 – 29 September 2009
- Leader: Matthias Platzeck; Kurt Beck; Frank-Walter Steinmeier (acting); Franz Müntefering
- Preceded by: Wolfgang Thierse
- Succeeded by: Manuela Schwesig

Minister of Finance of North Rhine-Westphalia
- In office 22 February 2000 – 12 November 2002
- Minister-President: Wolfgang Clement
- Preceded by: Heinz Schleußer
- Succeeded by: Jochen Dieckmann

Minister of Economy and medium-sized Businesses, Technology and Transportation of North Rhine-Westphalia
- In office 28 October 1998 – 22 February 2000
- Minister-President: Wolfgang Clement
- Preceded by: Bodo Hombach
- Succeeded by: Ernst Schwanhold

Minister of Economy, Technology and Transportation of Schleswig-Holstein
- In office 19 May 1993 – 28 October 1998
- Minister-President: Heide Simonis
- Preceded by: Uwe Thomas
- Succeeded by: Horst Günter Bülck
Parliamentary constituencies
Member of the Bundestag for North Rhine-Westphalia
In office 27 October 2009 – 30 September 2016
Preceded by	Rudolf Meyer
Succeeded by	Bettina Bähr-Losse
Constituency	Social Democratic List
Member of the Landtag of North Rhine-Westphalia for Unna III – Hamm II (Unna II; 2000–2005)
In office 1 June 2000 – 21 November 2005
Preceded by	Wolfram Kuschke (1998)
Succeeded by	Gerd Stüttgen

Personal details
- Born: 10 January 1947 (age 79) Hamburg, Allied-occupied Germany (now Germany)
- Party: Social Democratic
- Education: University of Kiel
- Occupation: Politician; Consultant; Political Staffer
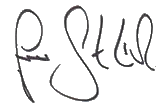
- Signature

Military service
- Allegiance: Germany
- Branch/service: Bundeswehr
- Years of service: 1968–1970
- Rank: Leutnant
- Unit: Army (Heer) / Panzergrenadierbrigade 31

Peer Steinbrück (born 10 January 1947) is a German politician who was the Chancellor-candidate of the Social Democratic Party (SPD) in the 2013 federal election. Steinbrück served as the eighth Minister-President of North Rhine-Westphalia from 2002 to 2005, a member of the Bundestag from 2009 to 2016, and as Federal Minister of Finance in the first Cabinet of Chancellor Angela Merkel from 2005 to 2009.

A graduate of the University of Kiel, Steinbrück began his political career in the office of Chancellor Helmut Schmidt and became chief of staff to Minister-President of North Rhine-Westphalia, Johannes Rau, in 1986. Steinbrück served as a state minister in both Schleswig-Holstein and North Rhine-Westphalia and succeeded Wolfgang Clement as Minister-President of North Rhine-Westphalia in 2002. Governing in an SPD-Green coalition, Steinbrück's tenure was noted for its attempt to reduce tax breaks and coal subsidies. In the 2005 state election, Steinbrück's SPD lost to the Christian Democratic Union (CDU) opposition led by Jürgen Rüttgers, thus marking the end of Steinbrück's tenure as Minister-President.

After the 2005 federal election, which resulted in a Grand Coalition government under the leadership of new Chancellor Angela Merkel of the CDU, Steinbrück was appointed Minister of Finance. In this position, Steinbrück was charged with reducing Germany's budget deficit, curbing public debt, and introducing changes in the taxation system. In the 2009 federal election, SPD chancellor-candidate Frank-Walter Steinmeier included Steinbrück as a member of his shadow cabinet.

In 2012, the National Assembly of the SPD elected Steinbrück as the chancellor-candidate of the SPD for the 2013 federal election. After he was nominated, controversy surrounding Steinbrück history of giving paid speeches to private banks such as JPMorgan Chase and Deutsche Bank, as well as the potential conflict of interest surrounding his seat on the board of steel conglomerate ThyssenKrupp, prompted criticism from both centre-right members of Angela Merkel's coalition as well as members of SPD's left-wing. Steinbrück's gaffe-prone campaign failed to gain traction, and the SPD was defeated by Merkel's CDU in the federal election which took place on 22 September 2013.

== Early life and education ==
Steinbrück was born in Hamburg, on 10 January 1947, to Ilse (née Schaper; 1919–2011) and Ernst Steinbrück (1914–1998), an architect born in Danzig. After having been trained as an officer of the reserve of the Bundeswehr, Steinbrück studied economics at the University of Kiel. He graduated in 1974.

== Career ==
=== Early career, 1974–2002 ===
After graduation Steinbrück worked for several German ministries and, from 1978 to 1981, in the office of German Chancellor Helmut Schmidt. He held positions in the Permanent Representative Office of the Federal Republic of Germany in East Berlin from 1981 to 1985. In the 1980s, Steinbrück was the chief of staff to the Minister President of North Rhine-Westphalia, Johannes Rau.

In 1993, he became the State Minister of Economic Affairs and Infrastructure in the state of Schleswig-Holstein. He then returned to North Rhine-Westphalia, where he became the Minister of Economic Affairs and Infrastructure in 1998 and Finance Minister in 2000.

=== Minister President of North Rhine-Westphalia, 2002–2005 ===
From 2002 to 2005 Steinbrück served as the eighth Minister President (Ministerpräsident or governor) of North Rhine-Westphalia. He headed a coalition government between the SPD and the Green Party.

In December 2002, Steinbrück accompanied Chancellor Gerhard Schröder on a visit to China for meetings with President of China Jiang Zemin and Premier Zhu Rongji.

In 2003, Steinbrück and Roland Koch, the Christian Democrat premier of Hesse, together drew up a plan to reduce tax breaks and subsidies, including those on coal. The subsidies were a particularly sensitive issue in North Rhine-Westphalia, where most of the coal mines were located then. Nevertheless, Steinbrück and Koch agreed that all subsidies were to be reduced by 12 percent over several years. Steinbrück was a supporter of the so-called "Agenda 2010".

In the state election on 22 May 2005, Steinbrück's SPD lost to the Christian democratic (CDU) opposition. This loss also had consequences for federal politics: then German Chancellor Gerhard Schröder, who already was enfeebled by weak opinion polls and criticism within his own party, announced plans to call an early federal election for the Bundestag. This resulted in the 2005 federal election four months later, after which Angela Merkel became Chancellor for the first time.

=== Federal Minister of Finance, 2005–2009 ===
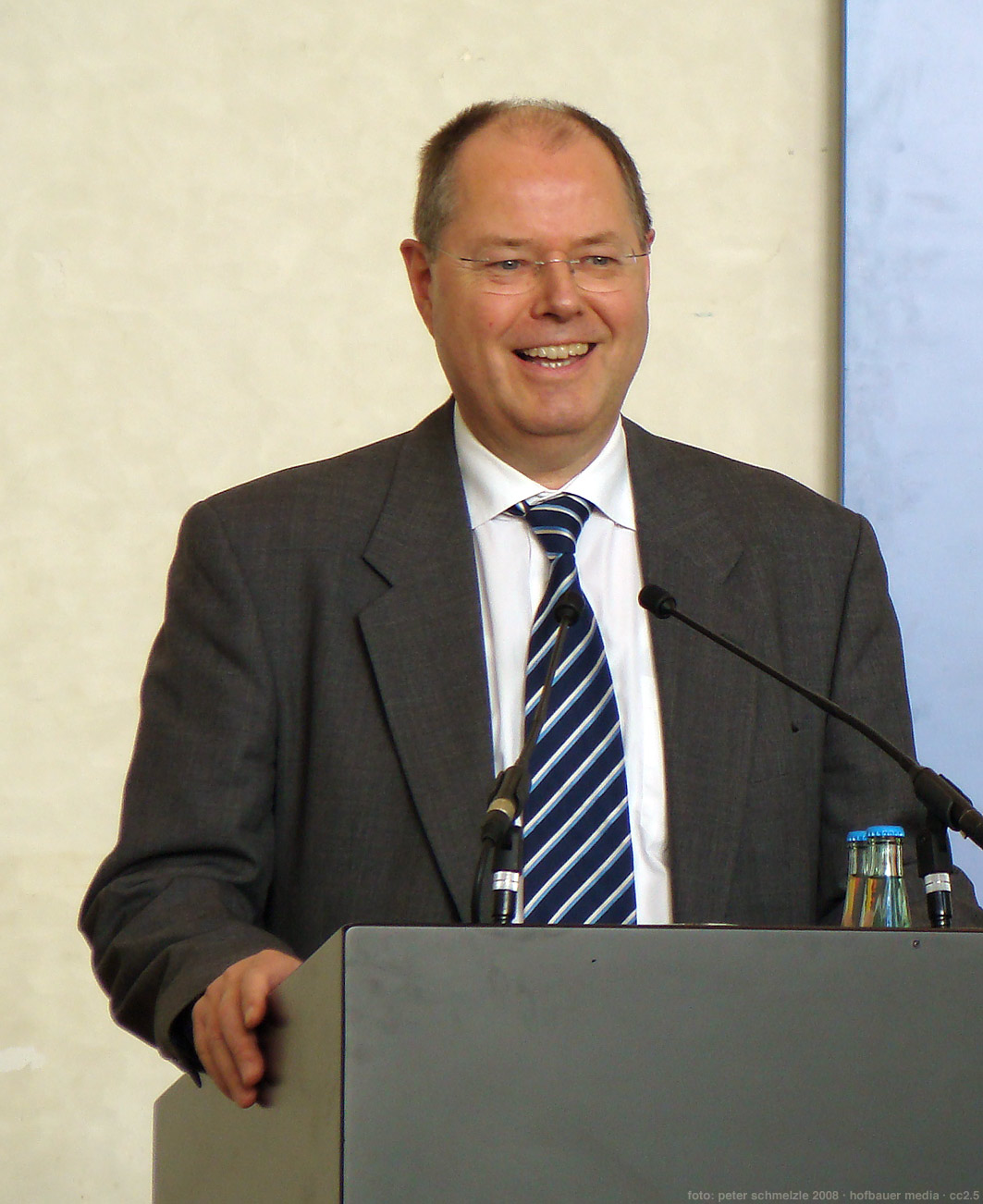
Steinbrück in 2008

After the 2005 federal election, SPD and CDU formed a Grand Coalition under the leadership of new Chancellor Angela Merkel (CDU). Peer Steinbrück became finance minister of Germany in November 2005. He was charged with reducing Germany's budget deficit, curbing public debt and introducing changes in the taxation system. Following his initiative, Germany introduced a flat rate withholding tax of 25 percent on private income from capital and capital gains, with the aim of preventing tax evasion. He oversaw and orchestrated the regulatory and fiscal efforts to counter the largest financial and economic crisis in post-War history.

From 2005, Steinbrück also served as deputy chairman of the SPD. Ahead of the 2009 elections, German foreign minister Frank-Walter Steinmeier included Steinbrück in his shadow cabinet of 10 women and eight men for the Social Democrats' campaign to unseat incumbent Angela Merkel as chancellor.

In a joint article in the Financial Times on 14 December 2010, Steinbrück and Steinmeier proposed to solve the European debt crisis with "a combination of a haircut for debt holders, debt guarantees for stable countries and the limited introduction of European-wide bonds in the medium term, accompanied by more aligned fiscal policies." In February 2011, Steinmeier proposed Steinbrück as a candidate to lead the European Central Bank.

=== Candidate for Federal Chancellor, 2012–2013 ===
On 9 December 2012 an extraordinary National Assembly of the SPD elected Steinbrück, with 93.45 percent of the votes, as candidate for Federal Chancellor, to run in the 2013 federal elections against Angela Merkel. Sigmar Gabriel, the party's chairman at the time, who had also been considered a possible candidate, said the leadership had agreed to nominate Steinbrück after Frank-Walter Steinmeier, the party's parliamentary leader, withdrew from the contest.

During his election campaign, Steinbrück promised to introduce rent controls, to raise taxes and use those funds for education and infrastructure. He also accused Merkel of showing a lack of passion for Europe in the euro area crisis because she was brought up in communist East Germany. In the run-up to the elections, he criticized Merkel's support for hardline austerity measures in indebted eurozone countries and reiterated his support for the euro, saying that its demise would "throw back European unification by 20 to 30 years" and result in currency appreciation that would "destroy any business." He also travelled to Greece for meetings with President Karolos Papoulias, Prime Minister Antonis Samaras, Finance Minister Yannis Stournaras and PASOK chairman Evangelos Venizelos.

On foreign policy issues, Steinbrück criticized Merkel for not joining Germany's allies in their military efforts against Libyan dictator Muammar Gaddafi. Also, he promised he would radically curtail German arms exports to countries such as Saudi Arabia.

In three stages from mid-May 2013, Steinbrück announced the twelve members of his shadow cabinet, including Cornelia Füllkrug-Weitzel, Gesche Joost, Yasemin Karakaşoğlu, Christiane Krajewski, Karl Lauterbach, Matthias Machnig, Thomas Oppermann, Florian Pronold, Oliver Scheytt, Klaus Wiesehügel, Manuela Schwesig and Brigitte Zypries. He signalled his support for Jürgen Trittin, at the time co-chairman of the Green Party's parliamentary group, to become minister of finance in the case of his win.

Although Steinbrück soon won the endorsement of former Chancellors Gerhard Schröder and Helmut Schmidt, his gaffe-prone campaign never gained traction against the popular Merkel. His previously established reputation as a crisis manager who had played a frontline role during the 2008 financial crisis was overshadowed by faux pas throughout the campaign. He clashed with Sigmar Gabriel, the party leader, whom Steinbrück said had not been supportive of his campaign.

In September Steinbrück would attract global attention after he was photographed giving the finger for a 'Don't say anything' interview with Sueddeutsche Zeitung. The gesture was in response to being asked about his unflattering nicknames such as "Problem Peer" and "Peerlusconi", the latter being a reference to controversial former Italian prime minister Silvio Berlusconi. Steinbrück would tweet a defence that "plain talking doesn't always mean using words, for example when one is constantly addressed about old issues instead of really important questions".

On 22 September, Steinbrück's Social Democrats won 25.7 percent, while Merkel's CDU and its Bavarian sister party CSU together won 41.5 percent of the vote. Following the elections, Steinbrück was part of the SPD delegation to hold exploratory talks with the CDU/CSU on forming a coalition government.

=== Member of the Bundestag, 2013–2016 ===
As member of parliament, Steinbrück served on the Committee on Foreign Affairs and as chairman of the German-American Parliamentary Friendship Group from 2013 until 2016.

In March 2015, Steinbrück joined the Agency for Modernization of Ukraine, an initiative led by Dmitry Firtash to develop a comprehensive plan of political and economic reforms in the country.

In September 2015, Steinbrück announced that he would not stand in the 2017 federal elections. He vacated his Bundestag seat in the end of September 2016.

In 2018, he wrote a book titled Das Elend der Sozial-demokratie. Anmerkungen eines Genossen., which explored the reasons why the SPD always lost elections from an insider's perspective.

== Political positions ==
=== Economic policy ===
Steinbrück has been a prominent speaker for the SPD, especially on economic matters.

During a 2007 visit to Washington for meetings with the Treasury secretary, Henry M. Paulson Jr. and Ben S. Bernanke, chairman of the Federal Reserve, after the collapse of Amaranth Advisors, Steinbrück lobbied for the development of an internationally accepted "code of conduct" for the hedge fund industry, arguing that a "sizable number" of hedge funds "are not behaving properly."

Steinbrück predicted in 2008, in the wake of Lehman Brothers' bankruptcy, that the United States' days as a financial superpower were numbered. In December 2008 interview with Newsweek, he controversially attacked the British Keynesian approach to economic policy. He raised scepticism about the effectiveness of large fiscal stimulus packages and criticized the resulting increase in public debt. His comments led Steinbrück into a highly public press battle with Paul Krugman, the Nobel laureate economist and New York Times columnist. An adherent to Keynes' theory that government spending creates growth, Krugman wrote in December 2008—in a direct attack on Steinbrück—that the primary "multiplier effect" that government spending programs were having was that of "multiplying the impact of the current German government's boneheadedness."

During his time as German Finance Minister, Steinbrück repeatedly accused the United Kingdom of pandering to the City of London by hindering efforts to reform global financial markets. In 2009, Steinbrück opposed any plans by the G-20 major economies to limit the size of banks to avoid individual institutions wielding too much influence in future and posing a risk. At the 2009 G-20 Pittsburgh summit, he supported a Dutch proposal to limit banking executives' bonuses to the level of their fixed annual salary. Also, he called for a global tax to be imposed on financial transactions in a bid to end what he derided as "binge-drinking" on markets.

In a 2010 interview on German television, it appeared that Steinbrück, who had adopted a very critical stance of the shadow banking system, attributed characteristics of the private equity industry to hedge funds.

In 2012, Steinbrück tabled a plan for sweeping financial regulation that he intended to be a main plank of his election platform. It included compelling banks to finance a €200 billion rescue fund, and splitting investment from retail banking.

=== European integration ===
At the 2006 meetings of the IMF and the World Bank in Singapore, Steinbrück argued that, as the world's third largest economy after the US and Japan, Germany must keep its influence in the IMF amid wide-ranging reform of the institution, ruling out suggestions that the Eurozone members should have only one seat on the board as part of the planned overhaul of IMF members' votes.

== Other activities ==
=== Corporate boards ===
- Borussia Dortmund, Member of the Supervisory Board
- ING Group, Advisor to the Board of Directors of ING-DiBa
- ThyssenKrupp, Member of the Supervisory Board (2010–2012)
- KfW, Member of the supervisory board (2006–2009)

=== Non-profit organizations ===
- Berlin Palace–Humboldtforum Foundation, deputy chairman of the Board of Trustees
- Deutsche Nationalstiftung, Member of the Senate
- Federal Chancellor Helmut Schmidt Foundation, chairman
- Helmut and Loki Schmidt Foundation, deputy chairman
- ZEIT-Stiftung, member of the Board of Trustees
- IG Bergbau, Chemie, Energie (IG BCE), member

== Controversy ==
Steinbrück has been labelled by the media as a sharp-witted political pugilist whose frank opinions have occasionally attracted controversy.

=== Business activities ===
As soon as he was nominated as the Social Democrat's challenger to German Chancellor Angela Merkel in the 2013 federal elections, Steinbrueck announced he would quit the board of steel conglomerate ThyssenKrupp and all outside work, though not an unpaid seat on soccer club Borussia Dortmund's board where he saw no conflict of interest. His decision prompted a slew of criticism of his high earnings outside the Bundestag from Merkel's center-right coalition but also from the SPD's left wing and from anti-graft campaigners. The seat on ThyssenKrupp's board and all but four of the other 85 appointments and engagements listed for the time between 2009 and 2012 were in excess of 560,000 euros.

Later in his campaign, Steinbrück canceled a speech at Bank Sarasin & Cie after Süddeutsche Zeitung reported that the Swiss private bank was being investigated by German prosecutors for possible tax evasion. Soon after, he declared he had earned 1.25 million euros ($1.6 million) by giving 89 speeches between 2009 and 2012 at companies and banks including Deutsche Bank, JPMorgan Chase, BNP Paribas, Sal. Oppenheim, Union Investment, Ernst & Young, Freshfields Bruckhaus Deringer and Baker & McKenzie. This sum was in addition to his salary as a member of parliament, which was over 7,500 euros a month. The data also showed Steinbrück gave 237 other addresses for free to schools and charities, and got industry lobby groups to donate to charity instead of paying him. At the same time, he said the chancellor's salary, at about 250,000 euros annually, is too low because regional savings bank directors are paid more.

=== Namibia trip in 2007 ===
In April 2007, when Germany held the presidencies of both the European Union and the G7, Steinbrück was criticized for going on holiday with his family in Namibia instead of attending a meeting of G7 finance ministers in Washington and for refusing the offer of other G7 members to succeed Gordon Brown as chair of the International Monetary and Finance Committee (IMFC).

=== Diplomatic tensions with Switzerland and Liechtenstein ===
As finance minister, Steinbrück criticized Germany's neighbours in a row over tax havens.

In the wake of German investigations against the LGT Group of Liechtenstein in 2008, Steinbrück threatened that Germany would impose a levy on all fund transfers to the principality, in effect reinstating pre-1990s-style capital controls, if the country did not change its ways. Speaking to reporters in Paris after a conference on measures to combat tax avoidance, he said Switzerland deserved to be on a tax haven "black list" being drawn up by the Organisation for Economic Co-operation and Development because Swiss investment conditions encouraged some German taxpayers to commit fraud. He called on other European countries to "use the whip" on Switzerland over its tax havens, likening the Swiss to "Indians" running scared from the cavalry.

His criticism of the Swiss banking secrecy caused some tensions between Germany and Switzerland. The German ambassador to Bern was summoned to the foreign ministry to hear Switzerland's official reaction to what Foreign Minister Micheline Calmy-Rey described as Steinbrück's "contemptuous and aggressive" comments.

=== Comments on Italian election results ===
On 26 February 2013 Steinbrück said he was "appalled that two clowns have won" Italy's 24–25 February election. The vote was actually inconclusive with no party garnering a majority in parliament, although the anti-establishment party of commentator and comedian Beppe Grillo surged to about one fourth of valid votes. In reaction, Italian President Giorgio Napolitano cancelled a dinner in Berlin with Steinbrück, who was German opposition's chancellor candidate.

=== NSA spying ===
In May 2021, Danish state broadcaster DR reported that the U.S. National Security Agency (NSA) used a partnership with the Danish Defence Intelligence Service (FE) to spy on Steinbrück and other senior officials in Germany, including Chancellor Angela Merkel.

== Recognition ==
- 2011 – University of Düsseldorf, Honorary Doctorate
- 2011 – Steinbrück was awarded the Mercator Visiting Professorship for Political Management at the Universität Essen-Duisburg's NRW School of Governance

== Personal life ==
Steinbrück's wife, Gertrud (born 1950), is a former biology and politics teacher at a high school in Bonn. They have three children.

Political offices
Preceded by Uwe Thomas	Minister of Economy of Schleswig-Holstein; 1993–1998	Succeeded by Horst Günter Bülck
Preceded by Bodo Hombach	Minister of Economy of North Rhine-Westphalia; 1998–2000	Succeeded by Ernst Schwanhold
Preceded by Heinz Schleußer	Minister of Finance of North Rhine-Westphalia; 2000–2002	Succeeded by Jochen Dieckmann
Preceded by Wolfgang Clement	Minister-President of North Rhine-Westphalia; 2002–2005	Succeeded by Jürgen Rüttgers
Preceded by Hans Eichel	Federal Minister of Finance; 2005–2009	Succeeded by Wolfgang Schäuble
