= 2005 North Rhine-Westphalia state election =

German state election

- 22 May 2005

All 187 seats in the Landtag of North Rhine-Westphalia, including 6 overhang and leveling seats 94 seats needed for a majority
- Turnout: 8,333,363 (63.0% ▲6.3 pp)
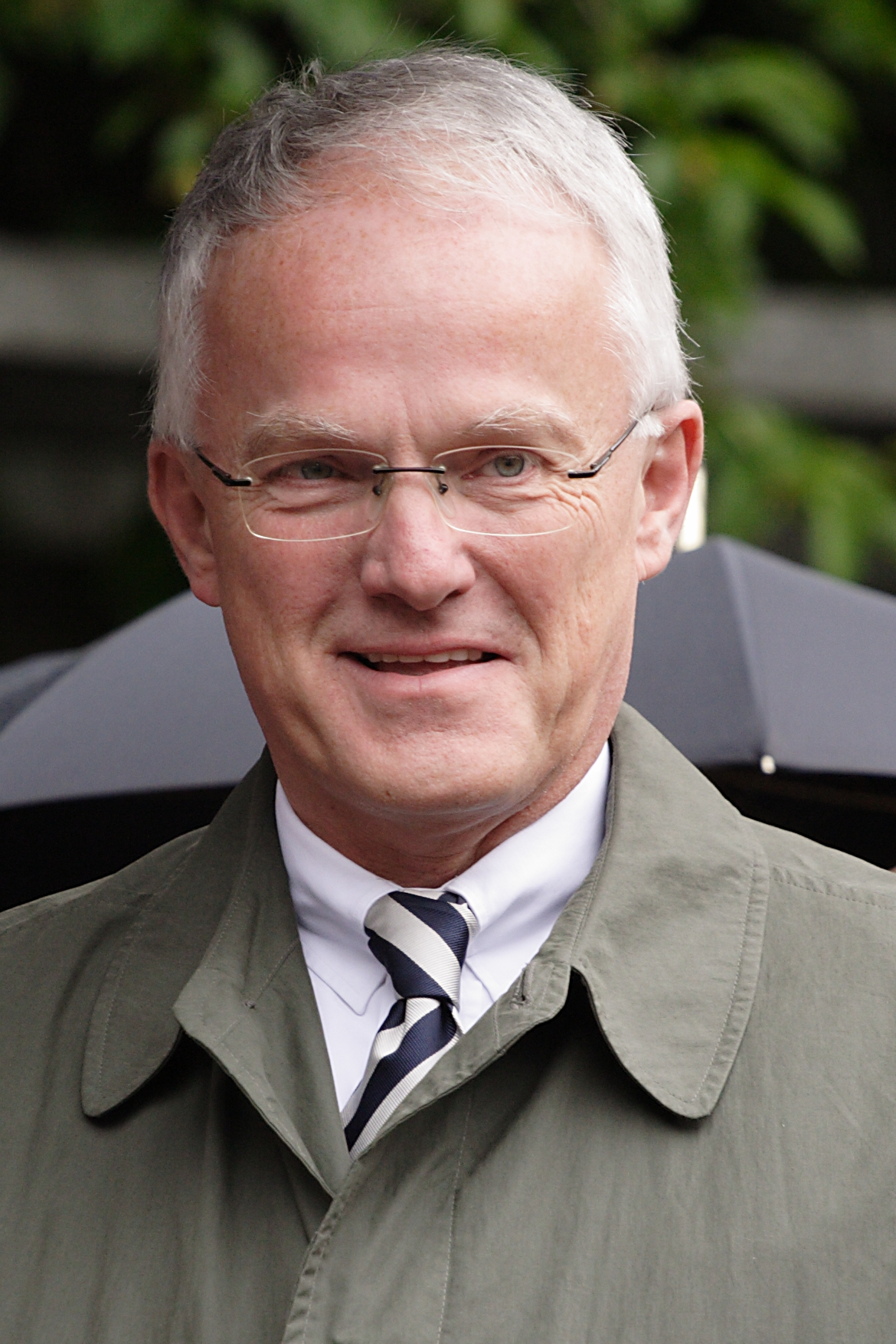

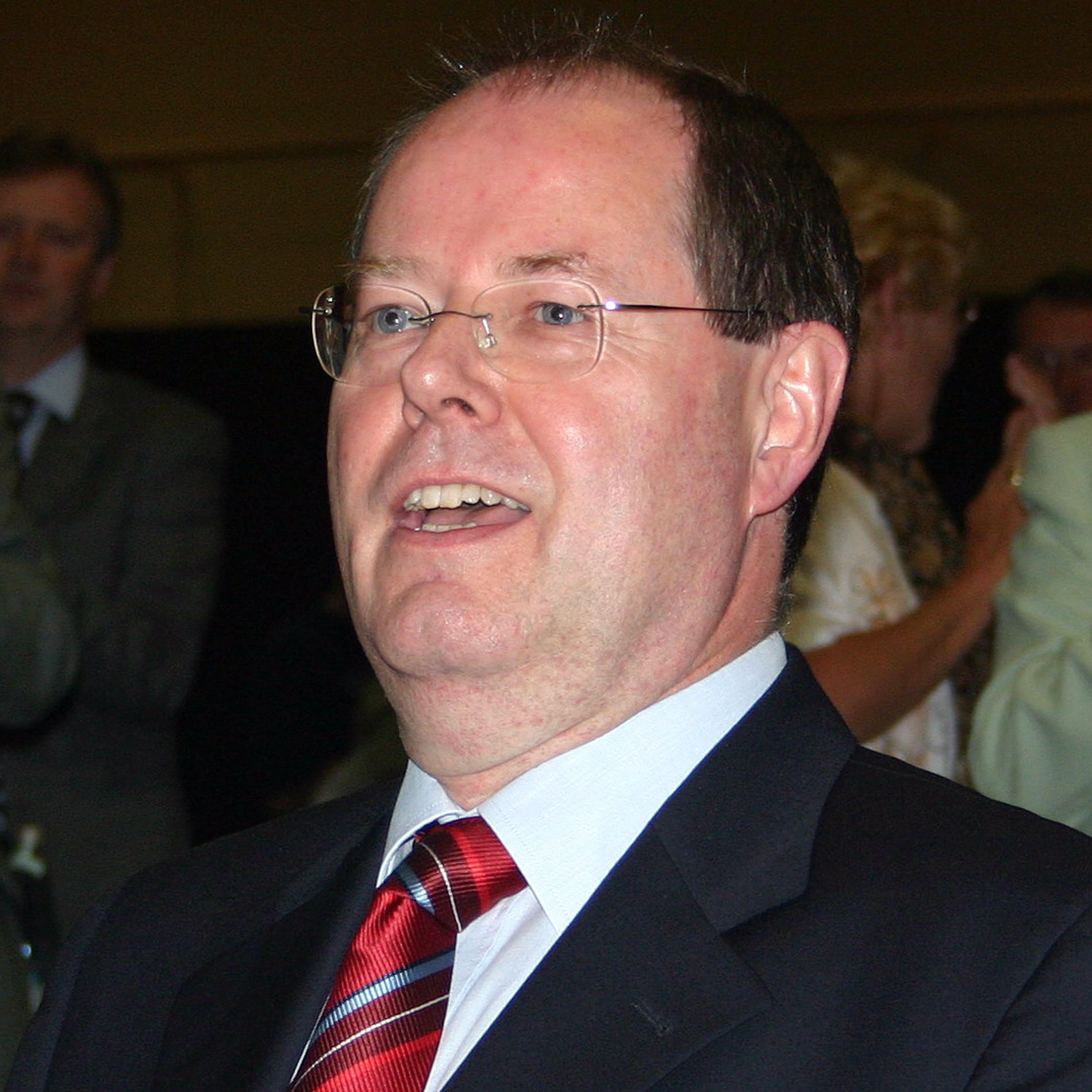

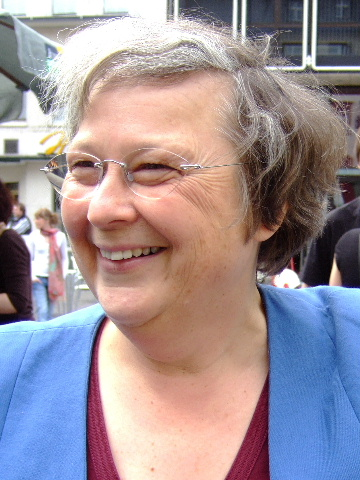

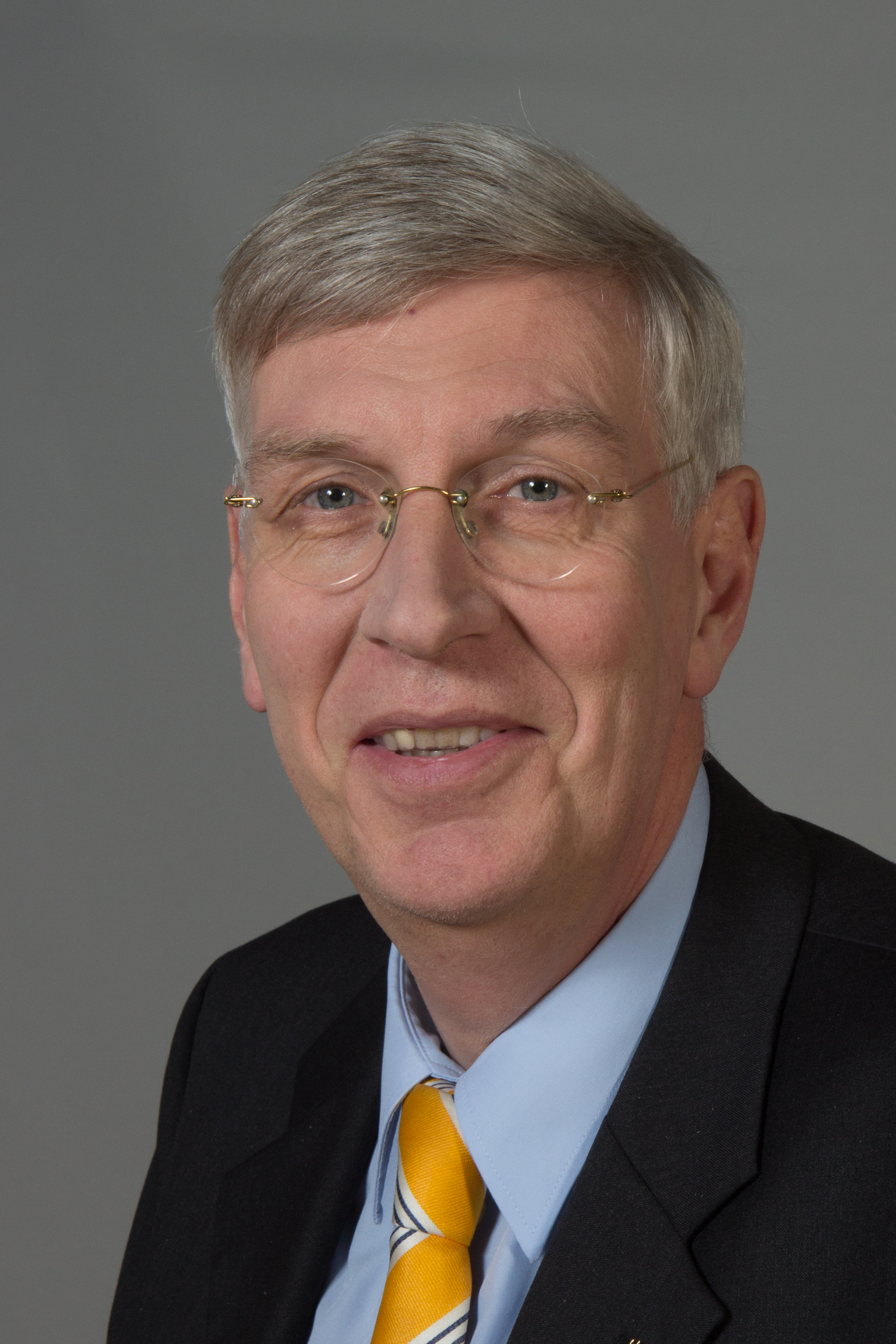
	First party	Second party
Candidate	Jürgen Rüttgers	Peer Steinbrück
Party	CDU	SPD
Last election	88 seats, 37.0%	102 seats, 42.8%
Seats won	89	74
Seat change	▲1	▼28
Popular vote	3,696,506	3,058,988
Percentage	44.8%	37.1%
Swing	▲7.8 pp	▼5.7 pp
	Third party	Fourth party
Candidate	Bärbel Höhn	Ingo Wolf
Party	Greens	FDP
Last election	17 seats, 7.1%	24 seats, 9.8%
Seats won	12	12
Seat change	▼5	▼12
Popular vote	509,293	508,266
Percentage	6.2%	6.2%
Swing	▼0.9 pp	▼3.6 pp
- Results for the single-member constituencies
Government before election
Steinbrück cabinet
SPD–Green
Government after election
Rüttgers cabinet
CDU–FDP

The 2005 North Rhine-Westphalia state election was held on 22 May 2005 to elect the 14th Landtag of North Rhine-Westphalia. The outgoing government was a coalition of the Social Democratic Party (SPD) and The Greens led by Minister-President Peer Steinbrück.

The result was a landslide defeat for the SPD, as the party suffered its worst result in 50 years at 37% and was ousted from government for the first time since 1966. The opposition Christian Democratic Union (CDU) under Jürgen Rüttgers won a commanding victory with 45% of votes and came just short of a majority in the Landtag. The Greens also suffered losses, as did the Free Democratic Party (FDP), with both finishing on 6.2%. The CDU subsequently formed a coalition with the FDP, and Rüttgers was elected Minister-President by the Landtag on 22 June.

The result had important ramifications outside North Rhine-Westphalia: such a crushing defeat for the SPD in a stronghold state was viewed as an indication of unpopularity of the federal government led by Gerhard Schröder. On the evening of the election, Schröder announced he would seek an early federal election. (Note: Since there is no way the government may call for new elections, he asked the Bundestag for a vote of confidence and urged his party colleagues to defeat the resolution in order for the president of Germany to call for new elections.)

== Electoral system ==
The Landtag was elected via mixed-member proportional representation. 128 members were elected in single-member constituencies via first-past-the-post voting, and 53 then allocated using compensatory proportional representation. A single ballot was used for both. The minimum size of the Landtag was 181 members, but if overhang seats were present, proportional leveling seats were added to ensure proportionality. Since the previous election in 2000, an electoral reform had been passed which reduced the number of single-member constituencies by 23 and the overall size of the Landtag by 20 members. An electoral threshold of 5% of valid votes is applied to the Landtag; parties that fall below this threshold are ineligible to receive seats.

== Background ==
In the previous election held on 14 May 2000, the SPD suffered losses and slid to 43% of the vote, while the CDU recorded another poor performance with 37%. The Greens also declined to 7% while the FDP recovered to 10% and re-entered the Landtag. The outgoing SPD–Green government retained a reduced majority and was renewed for a second term.

In November 2002, Minister-President Wolfgang Clement resigned to join the second Schröder cabinet as minister for economics and labour. He was succeeded by state finance minister Peer Steinbrück, who continued the coalition with the Greens.

== Parties ==
The table below lists parties represented in the 13th Landtag of North Rhine-Westphalia.

Name		Ideology	Lead candidate	2000 result	
Name		Ideology	Lead candidate	Votes (%)	Seats
SPD	Social Democratic Party of Germany; Sozialdemokratische Partei Deutschlands	Social democracy	Peer Steinbrück	42.8%	102 / 231
CDU	Christian Democratic Union of Germany; Christlich Demokratische Union Deutschlands	Christian democracy	Jürgen Rüttgers	37.0%	88 / 231
FDP	Free Democratic Party; Freie Demokratische Partei	Classical liberalism	Ingo Wolf	9.8%	24 / 231
GRÜNE	Alliance 90/The Greens; Bündnis 90/Die Grünen	Green politics	Bärbel Höhn	7.1%	17 / 231

A total of 22 parties and lists ran in the election, as did 17 independent candidates. A total of 1,343 candidates stood for election, of which 273 (20.3%) were women. Only the four parliamentary parties as well as The Republicans and Labour and Social Justice ran candidates in all 128 constituencies. Due to the single-vote system, the number of constituencies in which each party stood determined how much of the electorate they were able to reach, and thus how many votes they could gather.

== Campaign ==
Peer Steinbrück, who had been Minister-President for two and a half years by the time of the election, stood as lead candidate for the SPD. As in 2000, the CDU nominated state chairman Jürgen Rüttgers. Environment minister Bärbel Höhn led the Greens for a fourth time, and the FDP put forward Landtag group leader Ingo Wolf. The SPD and Greens aimed to continue their coalition, while the CDU and FDP sought to oust them with a coalition of their own. Polls showed the two blocs neck and neck at the start of the year, but the CDU and FDP established a strong lead by the start of March. Minister-President Peer Steinbrück remained popular and led Rüttgers in terms of personal polling; the SPD relied heavily on his personal image and placed less emphasis on the party brand, which was dragged down by federal issues The SPD also faced a challenge from the left in the form of WASG, a party founded by trade unionists and disgruntled SPD members opposed to the federal government's Agenda 2010. Important topics in the campaign were coal mining subsidies, wind energy, education, and the high unemployment rate.

== Opinion polling ==
Polling firm	Fieldwork date	Sample size	SPD	CDU	FDP	Grüne	WASG	Others	Lead
2005 state election	22 May 2005	–	37.1	44.8	6.2	6.2	2.2	3.5	7.7
Forsa	18 May 2005	1,326	36	43	7	7	–	7	7
Infratest dimap	12–13 May 2005	1,000	37	43	7.5	7.5	–	5	6
Infas	10–12 May 2005	750	36	43	8	7	–	6	7
Forschungsgruppe Wahlen	9–12 May 2005	1,062	35	44	7	9	–	5	9
Infratest dimap	10–11 May 2005	1,000	37	43	7	8	2	3	6
Forsa	26 Apr–6 May 2005	1,017	34	45	7	7	2	5	11
Infratest dimap	2–3 May 2005	1,010	35	45	7	8	–	5	10
Emnid	3 May 2005	?	34	44	7	9	2	4	10
Forsa	25–29 Apr 2005	1,109	35	45	7	7	2	4	10
Infratest dimap	26–28 Apr 2005	1,000	34	45	7	9	–	5	11
Emnid	26 Apr 2005	1,000	34	45	6	10	–	5	11
Emnid	29 Mar–18 Apr 2005	1,053	35	45	6	9	–	5	10
Infratest dimap	12–14 Apr 2005	1,000	35	45	7	8	–	5	10
Forschungsgruppe Wahlen	5–7 Apr 2005	1,039	36	46	6	8	–	4	10
Infratest dimap	4–5 Apr 2005	1,000	34	45	7	9	–	5	11
Emnid	24 Mar–3 Apr 2005	1,063	35	45	7	9	–	4	10
Forsa	30 Mar–5 Apr 2005	1,009	36	45	5	8	–	5	9
Infratest dimap	15–17 Mar 2005	1,000	35	42	7	10	1	5	7
Emnid	2–14 Mar 2005	1,058	35	43	7	10	–	5	8
Infratest dimap	1–3 Mar 2005	1,000	35	43	7	9	–	6	8
Forsa	21 Feb–1 Mar 2005	1,012	36	42	7	9	–	6	6
Infratest dimap	9–10 Feb 2005	1,000	37	39	7	9	–	8	2
Forsa	10–12 Jan 2005	1,302	39	39	7	9	–	6	Tie
Infratest dimap	4–6 Jan 2005	1,010	38	40	7	10	–	5	2
Emnid	3 Dec 2004	1,000	33	40	8	13	–	6	7
Forsa	2 Dec 2004	?	36	39	8	11	–	6	3
Infratest dimap	29 Oct–4 Nov 2004	1,075	36	40	8	11	–	5	4
Infratest dimap	13–15 Sep 2004	1,000	30	43	7	13	–	7	13
Emnid	8–9 Sep 2004	1,000	30	43	7	11	–	9	13
Infratest dimap	24–26 Aug 2004	1,000	32	42	7	12	3	4	10
Emnid	9 Aug 2004	1,000	28	44	8	12	–	8	16
Psephos	31 May–4 Jun 2004	1,000	33	47	6	10	–	4	14
Forschungsgruppe Wahlen	24 Apr 2004	?	29	49	5	12	–	5	20
Psephos	18 Apr 2004	1,003	34	47	7	8	–	4	13
dimap	2–8 Mar 2004	1,007	32	48	6	10	–	4	16
dimap	20–25 Jan 2004	1,001	32	48	8	9	–	3	16
dimap	19 Jan 2004	?	33	48	7	8	–	4	15
Psephos	2 Nov 2003	?	31	47	7	10	–	5	16
dimap	30 Sep–2 Oct 2003	1,050	34	47	6	10	–	3	13
Infratest dimap	1 Jul 2003	1,000	33	47	7	10	–	3	14
Emnid	13 Jun 2003	?	36	45	6	10	–	3	9
Forsa	26–30 May 2003	1,508	37	45	6	9	–	3	8
Infratest dimap	26–27 May 2003	1,000	33	45	8	11	–	3	12
dimap	19 May 2003	1,005	32	48	7	9	–	4	16
dimap	11–14 Mar 2003	1,000	33	48	6	10	–	3	15
Psephos	9 Feb 2003	1,005	33	46	8	10	–	3	7
Emnid	9–14 Jan 2003	1,000	36	45	6	9	–	4	9
Psephos	10 Nov 2002	?	39	43	8	7	–	3	4
Psephos	15 Apr 2002	?	36	38	12	8	–	6	2
Psephos	20 Jan 2002	?	39	41	10	6	–	4	2
Psephos	30 Sep 2001	?	43	38	10	6	–	3	5
Psephos	13 May 2001	?	44	35	11	7	–	3	9
Psephos	14 Jan 2001	?	41	38	9	8	–	4	3
2000 state election	14 May 2000	–	42.8	37.0	9.8	7.1	–	3.3	5.8

== Results ==
Graph of the party split among 187 seats.
Party	Votes	%	+/–	Seats			
Party	Votes	%	+/–	Con.	List	Total	+/–
Christian Democratic Union (CDU)	3,696,506	44.84	+7.87	89	0	89	+1
Social Democratic Party (SPD)	3,058,988	37.11	–5.73	39	35	74	–28
Alliance 90/The Greens (GRÜNE)	509,293	6.18	–0.88	0	12	12	–5
Free Democratic Party (FDP)	508,266	6.17	–3.67	0	12	12	–12
Labour and Social Justice – The Electoral Alternative (WASG)	181,988	2.21	New	0	0	0	New
National Democratic Party (NPD)	73,969	0.90	+0.87	0	0	0	±0
Party of Democratic Socialism (PDS)	72,989	0.89	–0.20	0	0	0	±0
The Republicans (REP)	67,220	0.82	–0.32	0	0	0	±0
The Grays – Gray Panthers (GRAUE)	18,335	0.22	New	0	0	0	New
Ecological Democratic Party (ÖDP)	15,751	0.19	+0.16	0	0	0	±0
Independent Candidates North Rhine-Westphalia (Unabh. Bürger)	6,950	0.08	–0.22	0	0	0	±0
Civil Rights Movement Solidarity (BüSo)	6,856	0.08	+0.05	0	0	0	±0
Party of Bible-abiding Christians (PBC)	6,361	0.08	+0.02	0	0	0	±0
Human Environment Animal Protection Party (Tierschutzpartei)	6,168	0.07	+0.03	0	0	0	±0
Family Party of Germany (FAMILIE)	4,291	0.05	±0.00	0	0	0	±0
Die PARTEI (PARTEI)	1,338	0.02	New	0	0	0	New
Centre Party (ZENTRUM)	1,261	0.02	New	0	0	0	New
New Start Middle-class Party (AMP)	940	0.01	New	0	0	0	New
Independent Workers' Party (UAP)	523	0.01	+0.01	0	0	0	±0
Party for a Rule of Law Offensive (Offensive D)	213	0.00	New	0	0	0	New
Independent Candidates for Direct Democracy (Unabh. Kandidaten)	204	0.00	New	0	0	0	New
Ecological Left–Anti-Racist List (ÖkoLinX-ARL)	184	0.00	±0.00	0	0	0	±0
Liberal Democrats	100	0.00	New	0	0	0	New
League for All-Germany (BGD)	56	0.00	±0.00	0	0	0	±0
Independents	5,264	0.06	–0.03	0	–	0	±0
Total	8,244,014	100.00	–	128	59	187	–44
Valid votes	8,244,014	98.93					
Invalid/blank votes	89,349	1.07					
Total votes	8,333,363	100.00					
Registered voters/turnout	13,230,366	62.99					

== Aftermath ==
Immediate coverage of the election was overwhelmed by its impact on federal politics: only half an hour after the polls closed, first SPD chairman Franz Müntefering and then Chancellor Gerhard Schröder announced the government's intention to seek an early dissolution of the Bundestag. A federal election had originally not been due until September of 2006, but Schröder and Müntefering felt the need for a renewed mandate for the government's agenda in light of a string of defeats on the state level, of which North Rhine-Westphalia was the most significant as it was a longtime stronghold of the SPD. The result also marked the defeat of the last incumbent SPD-Green state government. This led to a knock-on effect as Schröder quickly brought and deliberately lost a motion of confidence in the Bundestag and subsequently dissolved it. With the election looming, parties were forced to accelerate the selection and announcement of candidates; Angela Merkel was announced as the CDU/CSU's Chancellor candidate just a week after the election in North Rhine-Westphalia. These developments greatly overshadowed the state election and its local consequences, which receded into the background of coverage.

Polling conducted by Forschungsgruppe Wahlen reported that the poor economic situation, unpopular federal government, and weak perception of the state government were the most decisive factors in the outcome. On the key issue of unemployment, voters trusted the CDU much more than the SPD.

=== Government formation ===
The CDU and FDP quickly began negotiations for a coalition government. The former were led by Jürgen Rüttgers, while the FDP were led by lead candidate Ingo Wolf and state chairman Andreas Pinkwart. The draft coalition agreement was presented less than a month after the election on 17 June, and quickly ratified almost unanimously by both parties.

The new Landtag was inaugurated on 8 June, and Regina van Dinther was elected

President. Jürgen Rüttgers was elected Minister-President two weeks later on the 22nd, winning 99 votes in favour to 87 against. His cabinet took office on 24 June.
