= 2000 North Rhine-Westphalia state election =

German state election

- 14 May 2000

All 231 seats in the Landtag of North Rhine-Westphalia, including 20 overhang and leveling seats 116 seats needed for a majority
- Turnout: 7,409,399 (56.7% ▼7.3 pp)
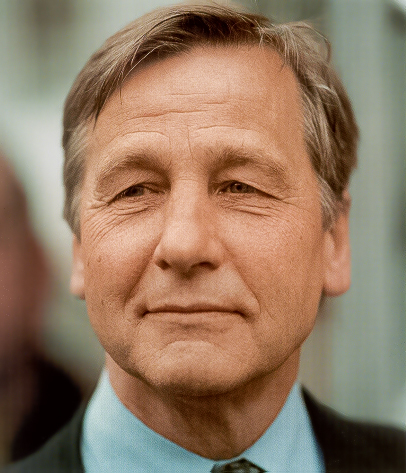

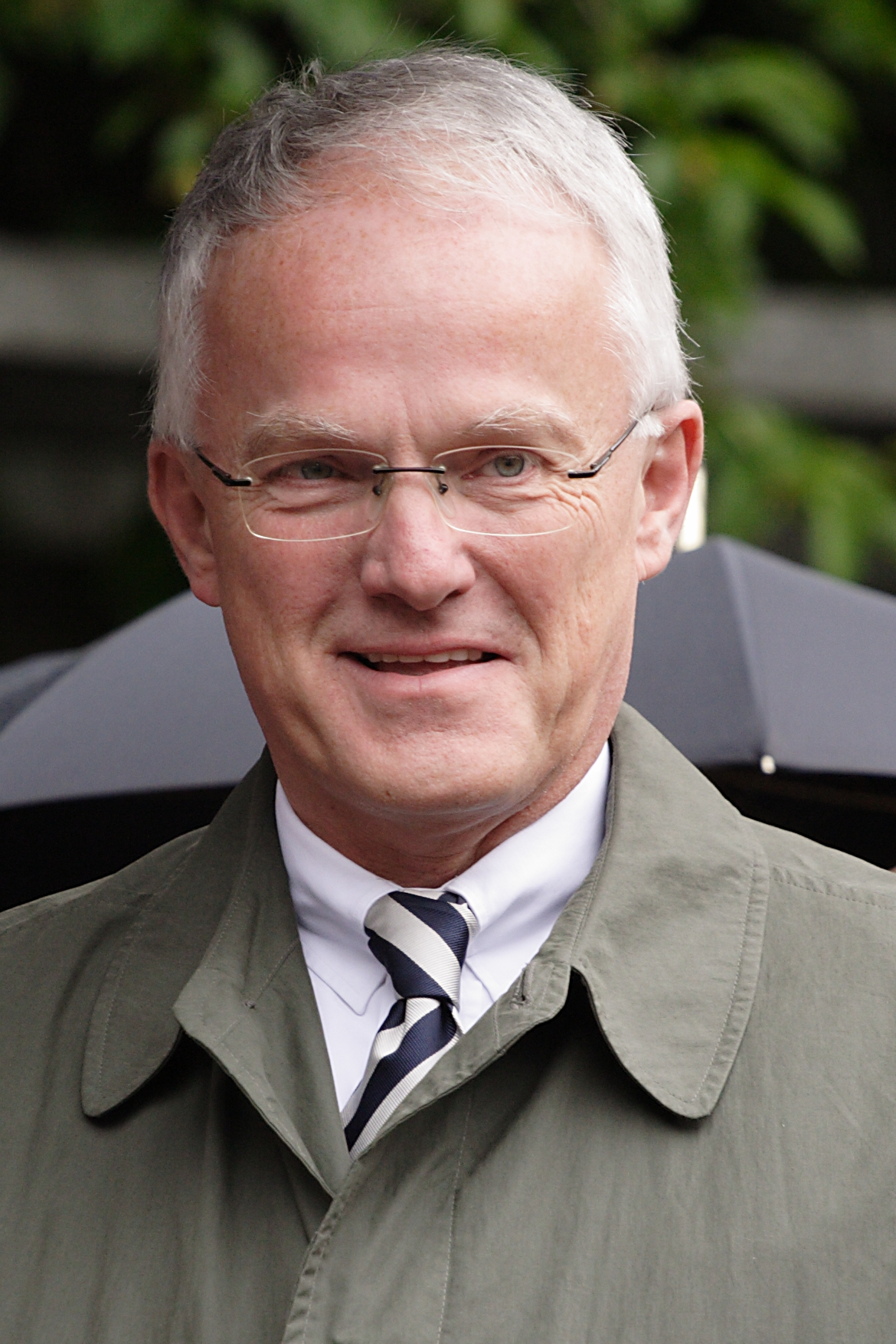

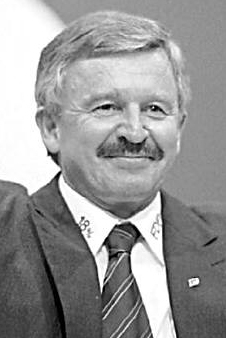

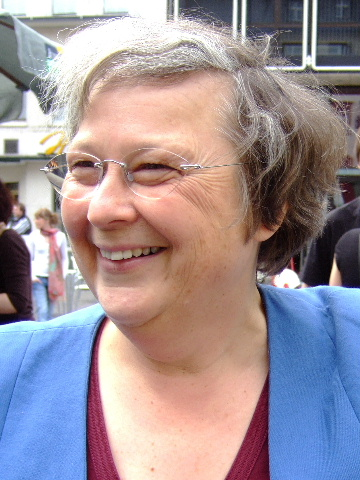
	First party	Second party
Candidate	Wolfgang Clement	Jürgen Rüttgers
Party	SPD	CDU
Last election	108 seats, 46.0%	89 seats, 37.7%
Seats won	102	88
Seat change	▼6	▼1
Popular vote	3,143,179	2,712,176
Percentage	42.8%	37.0%
Swing	▼3.2 pp	▼0.7 pp
	Third party	Fourth party
Candidate	Jürgen Möllemann	Bärbel Höhn
Party	FDP	Greens
Last election	0 seats, 4.0%	24 seats, 10.0%
Seats won	24	17
Seat change	▲24	▼7
Popular vote	721,558	518,295
Percentage	9.8%	7.1%
Swing	▲5.8 pp	▼2.9 pp
- Results for the single-member constituencies
Government before election
First Clement cabinet
SPD–Green
Government after election
Second Clement cabinet
SPD–Green

The 2000 North Rhine-Westphalia state election was held on 14 May 2000 to elect the 13th Landtag of North Rhine-Westphalia. The outgoing government was a coalition of the Social Democratic Party (SPD) and The Greens led by Minister-President Wolfgang Clement.

The SPD remained the largest party but declined to 42.8%, its worst result since 1958. However, the opposition Christian Democratic Union (CDU) failed to capitalise, falling slightly to 37%. The Free Democratic Party (FDP) returned to the Landtag in third place with 10%, while the Greens took losses and recorded 7%. Overall, the incumbent government retained a reduced majority. Minister-President Clement met with FDP lead candidate Jürgen Möllemann post-election, but the SPD settled on renewing the coalition with the Greens. Clement was re-elected by the Landtag on 21 June.

== Electoral system ==
The Landtag was elected via mixed-member proportional representation. 151 members were elected in single-member constituencies via first-past-the-post voting, and fifty then allocated using compensatory proportional representation. A single ballot was used for both. The minimum size of the Landtag was 201 members, but if overhang seats were present, proportional leveling seats were added to ensure proportionality. An electoral threshold of 5% of valid votes is applied to the Landtag; parties that fall below this threshold are ineligible to receive seats.

== Background ==
In the previous election held on 14 May 1995, the SPD lost their Landtag majority for the first time since 1980. The CDU recorded another poor performance with under 38% of the vote, while the FDP fell to 4% and lost their seats. The Greens achieved a significant victory with 10% and held balance of power in the Landtag, subsequently forming a coalition government with the SPD.

In May 1998, long-serving Minister-President Johannes Rau resigned. He was succeeded by state economics minister Wolfgang Clement, who continued the coalition with the Greens.

== Parties ==
The table below lists parties represented in the 12th Landtag of North Rhine-Westphalia.

Name		Ideology	Lead candidate	1995 result	
Name		Ideology	Lead candidate	Votes (%)	Seats
SPD	Social Democratic Party of Germany; Sozialdemokratische Partei Deutschlands	Social democracy	Wolfgang Clement	46.0%	108 / 221
CDU	Christian Democratic Union of Germany; Christlich Demokratische Union Deutschlands	Christian democracy	Jürgen Rüttgers	37.7%	89 / 221
GRÜNE	Alliance 90/The Greens; Bündnis 90/Die Grünen	Green politics	Bärbel Höhn	10.0%	24 / 221

== Campaign ==
Minister-President Clement stated he hoped for the SPD to regain its parliamentary majority, but that he could also accept a coalition with either the Greens or the FDP. The CDU under lead candidate Jürgen Rüttgers aimed to win government, in coalition with the FDP if necessary. The Greens campaigned for a continuation of the outgoing coalition, and capitalised on the SPD's ambivalence toward coalition partners with the slogan: "If you want red-green, you have to vote Green." The FDP ran with former Vice-Chancellor Jürgen Möllemann as their lead candidate, and sought to re-enter the Landtag and surpass the Greens for third place.

The CDU were dragged down by the ongoing donations scandal which began at the end of the previous year; their popularity in state polling fell from a high of 46% in December to just 32% in March.

== Opinion polling ==
Polling firm	Fieldwork date	Sample size	SPD	CDU	Grüne	FDP	Others	Lead
2000 state election	14 May 2000	–	42.8	37.0	7.1	9.8	3.3	5.8
Infratest dimap	8 May 2000	?	45	38	7	7	3	7
Infratest dimap	5 May 2000	?	45	39	6	6	4	6
Emnid	26 Apr 2000	?	41	40	7	7	5	1
Forsa	19 Apr 2000	?	46	38	6	6	4	8
Infratest dimap	12 Apr 2000	?	46	33	7	8	6	13
Forschungsgruppe Wahlen	3–6 Apr 2000	1,004	46	38	6	6	4	8
Infratest dimap	5 Mar 2000	?	47	32	7	9	5	15
Infratest dimap	16 Jan 2000	?	45	37	7	6	5	8
Forsa	9 Dec 1999	?	39	46	7	4	4	7
Emnid	6 Sep 1999	?	42	43	6	4	5	1
Forsa	3 Jun 1999	?	44	41	6	4	5	3
Psephos	23 Mar 1999	?	44	40	8	5	3	4
Psephos	3 Sep 1998	?	51	34	8	4	3	17
Psephos	28 May 1998	?	50	33	9	4	4	17
1995 state election	14 May 1995	–	46.0	37.7	10.0	4.0	2.3	8.3

== Results ==
Graph of the party split among 231 seats.
Party	Votes	%	+/–	Seats			
Party	Votes	%	+/–	Con.	List	Total	+/–
Social Democratic Party (SPD)	3,143,179	42.84	–3.18	102	0	102	–6
Christian Democratic Union (CDU)	2,712,176	36.97	–0.70	49	39	88	–1
Free Democratic Party (FDP)	721,558	9.84	+5.83	0	24	24	+24
Alliance 90/The Greens (GRÜNE)	518,295	7.06	–2.96	0	17	17	–7
The Republicans (REP)	83,296	1.14	+0.35	0	0	0	±0
Party of Democratic Socialism (PDS)	79,934	1.09	New	0	0	0	New
Independent Candidates for Direct Democracy (Unabh. Bürger)	22,059	0.30	New	0	0	0	New
Pensioners' Party (Rentner)	10,708	0.15	New	0	0	0	New
Marxist–Leninist Party of Germany (MLPD)	5,969	0.08	New	0	0	0	New
The Middle-class Party (DMP)	5,743	0.08	New	0	0	0	New
Party of Bible-abiding Christians (PBC)	4,123	0.06	–0.01	0	0	0	±0
Natural Law Party (Naturgesetz)	3,474	0.05	–0.11	0	0	0	±0
Family Party of Germany (FAMILIE)	3,420	0.05	+0.05	0	0	0	±0
Human Environment Animal Protection Party (Tierschutzpartei)	3,075	0.04	–0.08	0	0	0	±0
Civil Rights Movement Solidarity (BüSo)	2,530	0.03	+0.02	0	0	0	±0
National Democratic Party (NPD)	2,357	0.03	New	0	0	0	New
Ecological Democratic Party (ÖDP)	1,923	0.03	–0.23	0	0	0	±0
German Communist Party (DKP)	1,722	0.02	–0.05	0	0	0	±0
Feminist Party The Women (FRAUEN)	1,541	0.02	New	0	0	0	New
PETO – The Young Alternative (PETO)	993	0.01	New	0	0	0	New
From now... Alliance for Germany (Deutschland)	525	0.01	New	0	0	0	New
Humanist Party (HP)	405	0.01	+0.01	0	0	0	±0
Ecological Left (ÖkoLinX)	304	0.00	New	0	0	0	New
League for All-Germany (BGD)	178	0.00	New	0	0	0	New
Party for Non-voters (Nichtwähler)	175	0.00	New	0	0	0	New
Consciousness (Bewusstsein)	162	0.00	±0.00	0	0	0	±0
Independent Workers' Party (UAP)	152	0.00	±0.00	0	0	0	±0
Christian Centre (CM)	104	0.00	–0.01	0	0	0	±0
Independents	6,344	0.09	+0.07	0	–	0	±0
Total	7,336,424	100.00	–	151	80	231	+10
Valid votes	7,336,424	99.01					
Invalid/blank votes	72,988	0.99					
Total votes	7,409,412	100.00					
Registered voters/turnout	13,061,265	56.73					
