= Jürgen Klute =

German politician, social pastor, and co-publisher (born 1953)

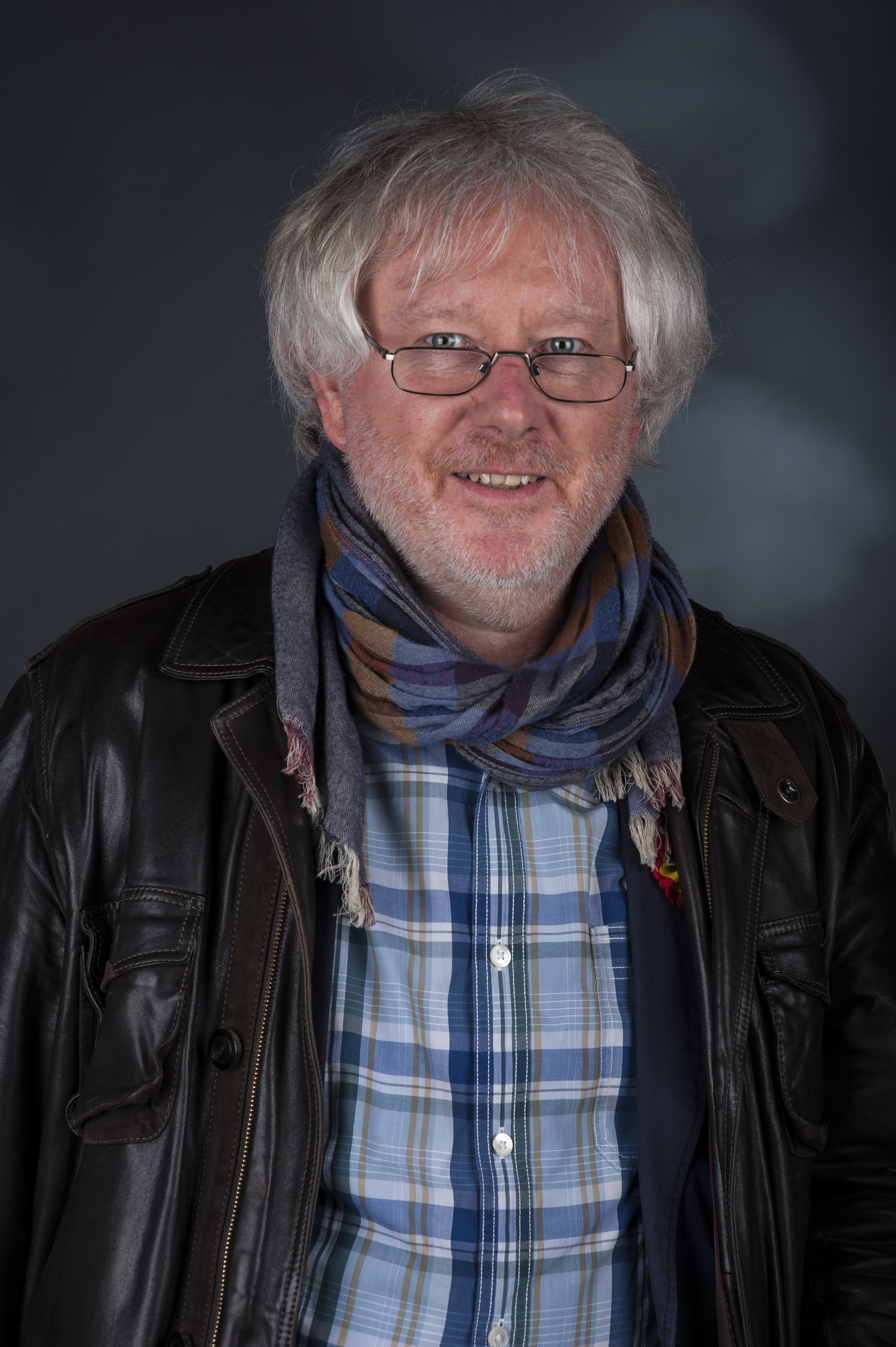
- Klute in 2014
- Born: 18 October 1953 (age 72); Bünde, West Germany (now Germany)
- Occupations: Politician, social pastor and co-publisher

Jürgen Klute (born in Bünde on 13 October 1953) is a German politician, social pastor, and co-publisher. He was a member of the European Parliament from 2009 to 2014. Klute is married and has two children.

== Education and work experience ==
Klute studied theology in Bielefeld and Marburg from 1974 to 1981 with a focus on peace pedagogy, liberation theology, material exegesis, and intercultural dialogue.

Klute successfully completed his preparation to be a pastor while working in the congregation of Marburg-Ockershausen between 1982 and 1984. He was a research assistant at the Kurhessen Waldeck Lutheran Theological College, focusing on peace education and intercultural dialogue from 1982 to 1986. Klute was also a school pastor at the vocational school in Bad Berleburg 1984–1986.

Klute participated in the project 'The World of Industrial Work and the Church' of Gladbeck-Bottrop-Dorsten Church District, Dorsten from 1986 to 1989. During the course of this project he worked for six months in the conditions of the underground shaft mines.

Klute was chosen to be the Industry- and Social pastor and head of the social ministry in Herne parish in 1989. After the dissolution of the social ministry in Herne, Klute worked as a study supervisor for school ethics at the Bochum City Lutheran Academy from 2007 to 2009.

== Social and political engagement in the Ruhr region ==
He has been a co-publisher and member of the editorial team of the periodical AMOS - Kritische Blätter aus dem Ruhrgebiet since 1988. He was head of the social pastorate (church service in the world of work) of Herne Church District from 1989 to 2006, and treasurer and member of the board of the European Contact Group, the Ecumenical European Network of Church Service in the world of work, based in Prague from 2001 to 2006.

Klute has also co-edited an array of books over social ethics, the relationship of religion to daily work environment, as well as books on current questions over social and job market policy. As social pastor in 1993, Klute belonged to the Herner Bündnis für Arbeit und soziale Gerechtigkeit (since 2004: „Herner Sozialforum“), serving as a spokesman until the end of 2004.

During the 2005 election campaign in Nordrhein-Westfalen, Klute was the leading candidate of the WASG (Wahlalternative Arbeit und soziale Gerechtigkeit). In this first campaign after the group's founding in 2004, the party received 2.2% of the vote, immediately becoming the fifth strongest political party in the state. From 2006 to 2009, Klute was a consulting member in the Cultural Committee of the Regionalverbandes Ruhr (RVR). At the end of April 2006, Klute was chosen for the extended national association of the WASG, in which he remained until its dissolution on 15 June 2007. On the 16th of June he joined the newly established Die Linke party, the German Left, and was elected onto the board from 2007 to 2009.

== EU representation ==
At the convention of Die Linke party in Essen, Klute was chosen to fill Place 6 on the party list, winning 85.9% of the votes. He later obtained 7.5% of the party votes in the European elections on 7 June 2009.

Klute was a member and representative of the European Left group GUE/NGL on the Committee on Economic and Monetary Affairs and was a substitute member of the Committee on Budgets. He was a member of the Delegation for Relations with the Mercosur Countries and was in the Delegation to the Euro-Latin American Parliamentary Assembly. He also acted as a substitute member of the Delegation to the EU-Turkey Joint Parliamentary Committee. In 2010 and 2011 he was a member of the Special Committee for Policy Challenges, which prepared negotiations concerning the multi-annual financial framework for the EU period 2014–2020.

Klute also contributed as a chief negotiator to formulate a directive through European Parliament to the Member States for an EU-wide establishment of the legal right to a checking account which will begin in 2016.

In 2013, motivated by the increasingly anti-European policies of the European Left, Klute waived a renewed candidacy for a place on the party list at Die Linke Party convention in Hamburg.

On 15 May 2014 for his commitment to the rights of small farmers in Colombia, Klute was awarded the Medal of Honor from the 'Contraloría y de la Contralora General de Colombia'.

== Publications ==
- Wolfgang Belitz, Jürgen Klute, Hans-Udo Schneider: Wohin driften die Kirchen? 10 Jahre Sozialwort. Eine ökumenische Zwischenbilanz. BoD Verlag, Norderstedt 2008.
- Jürgen Klute, Sandra Kotlenga (Hrsg.): Sozial- und Arbeitsmarktpolitik nach Hartz. Fünf Jahre Hartz-Reformen: Bestandsaufnahmen - Analysen - Perspektiven. Universitätsverlag Göttingen, 2008.
- Jürgen Klute, Herbert Schlender, Sabine Sinagowitz (Hrsg.): Positionen zum Mindestlohn in der evangelischen Kirche. Eine Dokumentation. BoD Verlag, Norderstedt 2007.
- Jürgen Klute, Franz Segbers (Hrsg.): Gute Arbeit verlangt ihren gerechten Lohn. Tarifverträge für die Kirchen. VSA Verlag, Hamburg 2006.
- Wolfgang Belitz, Jürgen Klute, Hans-Udo Schneider: Menschen statt Märkte. Für eine Neuorientierung der Kirche im Dritten System. Lit Verlag, Münster 2006.
- Jürgen Klute, Hans-Udo Schneider (Hrsg.): Auf dem Weg der Gerechtigkeit ist Leben. Sozialethische Anmerkungen und Skizzen zur Sozialen Gerechtigkeit heute. Lit Verlag, Münster 2005.
- Jürgen Klute, Lioba Schulte, Spyros Papaspyrou (Hrsg.): AGORA - Von der Kohle zum Amphitheater. Kleine Schritte in Richtung Europa. Lit Verlag, Münster 2004.
- Jürgen Klute, Herbert Schlender, Sabine Sinagowitz (Hrsg.): Gute Arbeit / Good Work. Lit Verlag, Münster 2004.
- Axel Gerntke, Jürgen Klute, Axel Troost, Achim Trube (Hrsg.): Hart(z) am Rande der Seriosität? Die Hartz-Kommission als neues Modell der Politikberatung und -gestaltung? Kommentare und Kritiken. Lit Verlag, Münster 2002.
- Wolfgang Belitz, Jürgen Klute, Hans-Udo Schneider: Zukunft der Arbeit in einem neuen Gesellschaftsvertrag. Lit Verlag, Münster 2001.
