= Bodo Hombach =

German politician

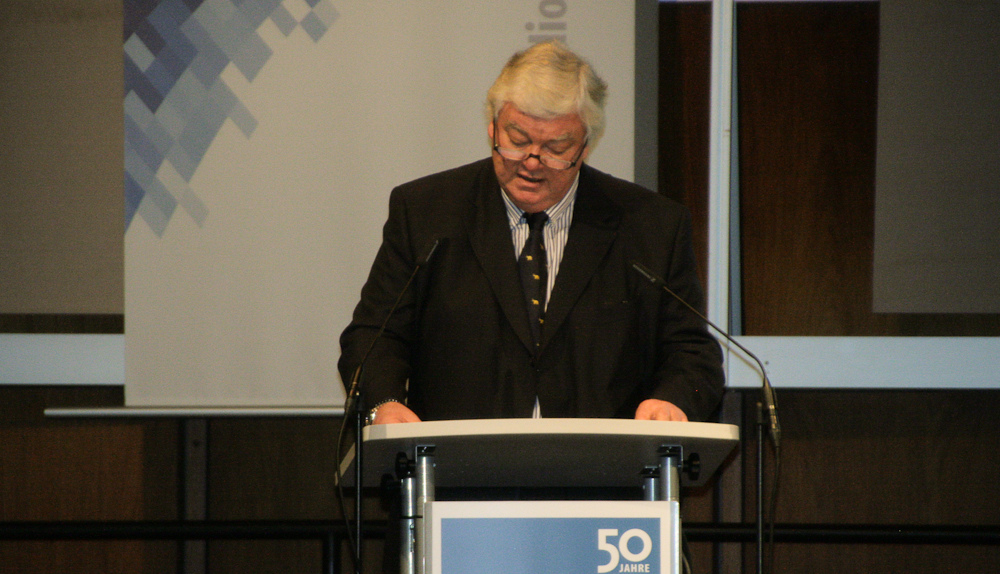
Bodo Hombach

Bodo Hombach (born 19 August 1952) is a German politician of the Social Democratic Party of Germany (SPD).

== Early life and education ==
Bodo Hombach was born in Mülheim on the Ruhr, North Rhine-Westphalia. After training to become a telecommunications craftsman (apprenticeship from 1967 to 1970 with the Telephone Exchange in Duisburg), he studied Social Work at the Düsseldorf Polytechnic from 1973 to 1978.

== Career ==
=== Career in state politics ===
In the run-up to the 1980 state elections, Hombach took over as secretary general of the SPD and helped run its chairman Johannes Rau's campaign to win an absolute majority in North Rhine-Westphalia for the first time since the federal state was established. Five years later, Hombach and team decided to fight the 1990 state election with a personalised campaign focused on the Rau himself, who had become deputy chairman of the national party in 1982. He himself became a member of the Landtag of North Rhine-Westphalia for the SPD from 1990 to 1998. He was its State Party Chairman from 1979 to 1991 and Economic Spokesman of the SPD State Parliamentary Group and Chairman of the Enquiry Board from 1990 to 1998.

Apart from his political activity, Hombach was managing director of the private limited companies, Preussag Handel GmbH (Salzgitter) and Preussag (Salzgitter) International GmbH in Düsseldorf from 1991 to 1998.

In 1998, Hombach briefly joined Minister-President Wolfgang Clement's cabinet as State Minister for Economy and SME, Technology and Transport in North Rhine-Westphalia.

Hombach co-ordinated several election campaigns of the Social Democratic Party and the Federal Social Democratic Party of North Rhine-Westphalia. He was regarded as a brilliant election campaign strategist and creator of the slogan 'We in North Rhine-Westphalia'. Nelson Mandela chose him to be his personal adviser for his first election campaign.

=== Career in national politics ===
In October 1998, Gerhard Schröder appointed Hombach to his Cabinet as Federal Minister for Special Tasks and Head of the Federal Chancellery. Hombach ranked among the most powerful and influential politicians not just because of his charisma and high-profile. Within the Schröder government, he was widely seen as firm opponent of Finance Minister Oskar Lafontaine's policies.

Hombach showed his party the way to new groups of voters and was an advocate of the 'new centre ground', a reform-oriented policy to safeguard the country's future viability. Indicative of this policy was the 'Schröder-Blair Paper' published under the title 'The way ahead for Europe's Social Democrats' and written by Hombach and his British counterpart Peter Mandelson. 'Bodo Hombach, Germany's trouble-shooter' was The Economist's headline about the 'boy wonder from the Ruhr'. "The magazine was surprised that despite his wealth of power, Hombach continued to be a 'lone fighter', an 'outsider', who was just as fiercely persecuted by the 'old school of the left wing' as by the 'apparatchiks at the party headquarters of the Social Democratic Party in Bonn', commented the German daily paper Die Welt at the time.

== European politics ==
In 1999, Hombach moved to Brussels, where he took over the position of EU Special Coordinator for the Stability Pact for South Eastern Europe.

"Who thinks for Schröder?", wrote today's Chairman of the Board of Directors of Axel Springer AG, Mathias Döpfner, in the 'Welt' newspaper in 1999 and stated: "However important Hombach's new job may be – it is as if a builder-owner swaps the architect just after the formwork for the foundation has been laid. Schröder left the thinking to others – namely Hombach. And the latter thought right most of the times. Inconvenient for Social Democrats but competent. Quickly mutated from a youth movement representative to a market-orientated deregulator, he became the most hated enemy of the reactionary left wing of the party."

Despite the over-bureaucratised Brussels environment, which Hombach characterised with 'My Balkan is Brussels', he collected about €4.6 billion for the Balkan countries in his capacity as Special Coordinator of the Stability Pact for South Eastern Europe during the first donor conference in 2000.

== Publishing management ==
From 2002 until 2012, Hombach served as managing director of Funke Mediengruppe (formerly WAZ Media Group). Since then he is - among other things - consequently campaigning for freedom of press and emphasizes primarily its importance for democracy. In this capacity, he is responsible for the reorientation of the publishing company to a multimedia company through the establishment of future-viable structures in the WAZ Media Group based in Essen, Germany. He very strongly supported the creation of professional journalistic standards for the newspapers and magazines of the WAZ Media Group on the Balkan. In 2003, the WAZ Media Group and the Norwegian publishing company Orkla, were the only western publishing houses that had signed the Organization for Security and Co-operation in Europe guidelines on press freedom in South-East Europe. Hombach believes that freedom, political and economic independence and journalistic quality of the newspapers are the absolute prerequisites for the establishment of democratic structures in the former transformation countries of South-East Europe. Groundbreaking was the agreement on the promotion of freedom of the press, quality journalism and fair working conditions at the WAZ Media Group locations producing newspapers and magazines in South-East Europe signed by Bodo Hombach, managing director of the WAZ, and Aidan White, Secretary General of the International Federation of Journalists (IFJ) in Essen, Germany, in July 2007.

== Later career ==
In April 2008, Hombach was appointed by Minister-President Jürgen Rüttgers as Deputy Chairman of the Commission for the Future of the State Government of North Rhine-Westphalia, chaired by Ralf Dahrendorf.

== Other activities ==
- Brost Foundation, Deputy Chairman of the Board
- Deloitte Germany, Member of the Advisory Board

== Recognition ==
In July 2002, Hombach was given the 'European Bull' award by the Taxpayers Association of Europe (TAE) because as a Special Coordinator he set a very positive example in the sparing use of budgets. "The stability pact administration has been so well developed that it could take on the management of other EU Special Commissioners as well", is how Die Welt newspaper cited the Christian Social Union of Bavaria MP and Vice President of the European Parliament, Ingo Friedrich.

In 2006, Hombach was presented the Order of Merit of North Rhine-Westphalia by Minister-President Jürgen Rüttgers.
