= Wolfgang Clement =

German politician (1940–2020)

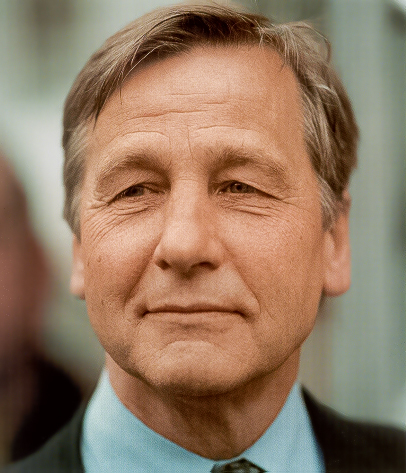
- Clement in 2004

Minister for Economics and Labour
- In office 22 October 2002 – 22 November 2005
- Chancellor: Gerhard Schröder
- Preceded by: Werner Müller (Economic Affairs and Energy); Walter Riester (Labour and Social Affairs)
- Succeeded by: Michael Glos (Economics and Technology); Franz Müntefering (Labour and Social Affairs)

Minister-President of North Rhine-Westphalia
- In office 27 May 1998 – 22 October 2002
- Deputy: Michael Vesper
- Preceded by: Johannes Rau
- Succeeded by: Peer Steinbrück

Minister of Economy and medium-sized Businesses, Technology and Transportation of North Rhine-Westphalia
- In office 17 July 1995 – 9 June 1998
- Minister-President: Johannes Rau
- Preceded by: Günther Einert (Economy, medium-sized Businesses and Technology)
- Succeeded by: Bodo Hombach

Minister for Special Affairs and Chief of the State Chancellery of North Rhine-Westphalia
- In office 12 June 1990 – 17 July 1995
- Minister-President: Johannes Rau
- Preceded by: Klaus Dieter Leister
- Succeeded by: Rüdiger Frohn
Parliamentary constituencies
Member of the Landtag of North Rhine-Westphalia
In office 1 June 1995 – 7 November 2002
Preceded by	Georg Aigner
Succeeded by	Karsten Rudolph
Constituency	Bochum II
In office 1 October 1993 – 1 June 1995
Preceded by	Wilhelm Vollmann
Succeeded by	multi-member district
Constituency	Social Democratic Party List

Personal details
- Born: 7 July 1940 Bochum, Germany
- Died: 27 September 2020 (aged 80) Bonn, Germany
- Cause of death: Lung cancer
- Party: Independent
- Other political affiliations: Social Democratic Party (1970–2008)
- Education: University of Marburg

Wolfgang Clement (German: [ˈvɔlfɡaŋ ˈkleːmɛnt]; 7 July 1940 – 27 September 2020) was a German politician and a member of the Social Democratic Party of Germany (SPD). He was the 7th Minister President of North Rhine-Westphalia from 27 May 1998 to 22 October 2002 and Federal Minister of Economics and Labour from 2002 to 2005. He was an Honorary Member of the International Raoul Wallenberg Foundation.

He was known for being one of the architects of the Agenda 2010 labor market reforms under chancellor Gerhard Schröder in the early 2000s. He was also credited with the merger of the federal ministry of economics and labor and the Hartz I through IV labor market reforms. The labor and welfare reforms have been credited with reducing unemployment and contributing to Germany's growth years. However, the reforms have been a divisive topic and created a lasting rift between the leftists and the centrists at the SPD.

== Education and career ==
Clement was born on 7 July 1940 in Bochum, North Rhine-Westphalia, and was the son of a bricklayer. He completed his schooling Abitur at the Graf-Engelbert-Schule in Bochum. He then completed his apprenticeship, Volontariat, at the Westfälische Rundschau newspaper in Dortmund. He completed his degree in law at the University of Münster in 1965, including clearing the First State Examination, a qualification that allowed him to teach.

Clement later worked as an articled clerk and assistant at the Institute for Trial Law at the University of Marburg. In 1968, he returned to the Westfälische Rundschau, first as a political editor, and went onto become the head of political department, and then the deputy editor-in-chief of the newspaper. In 1986, Clement moved to the Hamburger Morgenpost, where he remained as editor-in-chief until 1989.

On 12 November 2004, he was presented with an honorary doctorate (Dr. h. c.) by the Ruhr University in Bochum.

== Political career ==
Clement started his political career with the Social Democratic Party of Germany (SPD) in 1970 and was a member of the party until 2008. Between 1981 and 1986, he was a spokesman for the party's federal executive board, and was also the deputy party whip between 1985 and 1986.

In 1989, he was appointed head of the State Chancellery of North Rhine-Westphalia (NRW) by then NRW Minister President Johannes Rau's government. He relinquished this position in favor of the position of State Minister of Special Tasks for NRW after the state elections in 1990. After the 1995 state elections, he was the State Minister of Economics and Small Business, Technology, and Transport.

=== Member of State Parliament (1993–2002) ===
Clement was a member of the State Parliament of North Rhine-Westphalia from 1 October 1993 to 6 November 2002. Between 1994 and 2001, he was also on the SPD State Executive in North Rhine-Westphalia (NRW), and was the deputy leader of the executive from 1996. He became a member of the SPD federal executive board in 1995, and served until his exit from the party in 2008.

=== Minister President (1998–2002) ===
Clement was elected as Johannes Rau's successor as the Minister president of North Rhine-Westphalia on 27 May 1998. With state debts in excess of 130,000 million marks (DEM), he announced drastic cuts and austerity measures including reduction in the size of his own cabinet.

In one of his first moves on 17 June 1998, he announced the merger of the Justice and Interior ministries into one entity. There were doubts if this decision was compatible with the German Constitution, as it was seen by some as a violation of the division of powers. On 9 February 1999, the Constitutional Court of North Rhine-Westphalia ruled that the amalgamation violated the rights of the state parliament. In addition with pressure from coalition partner Bündnis '90/Die Grünen (the Green party), the merger was canceled. He took on the responsibilities of justice minister for a brief period between 10 and 22 March 1999, before handing the position over to Jochen Dieckmann, who served as the Justice Minister for NRW through the end of the legislature term on 27 June 2000. During this period, Clement also served as the deputy chairman of the SPD from December 1999. In the 2000 state elections under his leadership, the SPD received 42.8% of the votes, a drop of 3.2% from the previous election. However, the party was able to form a coalition government with the Green Party. In this coalition, there were debates between Clement and the Green Party's Bärbel Höhn, who opposed the continuation of coal mining subsidies and the support for large industrial projects like the Garzweiler surface mine, that were supported by Clement.

After Clement started his term of office as state premier of North Rhine-Westphalia on 27 May 1998, four ministers resigned or left their position early —Minister for the Economy Bodo Hombach (moved to Bonn as Minister of the Chancellery), Justice Minister Reinhard Rauball (resigned after a week in position), Minister for European and Federal Affairs Detlev Samland (resigned due to tax misdemeanor), and Finance Minister Heinz Schleußer (Flugaffäre flights misuse). This was also the time when Clement proclaimed that the media industry in NRW would be the "engine of structural change" in the state. The move however, saw limited success. An animation studio in Oberhausen received €50 million in funding as part of this program, but generated limited employment in the end.

In Clement's time in office as the state premier of NRW, four parliamentary investigative committees, or Parlamentarische Untersuchungsausschüsse (PUAs), were set up: Review of state enterprises, High Definition Oberhausen (HDO – PUA II), High Definition Oberhausen (HDO – PUA III), and Westdeutsche Landesbank Girozentrale.

=== Federal Minister of Economics and Labour (2002–2005) ===
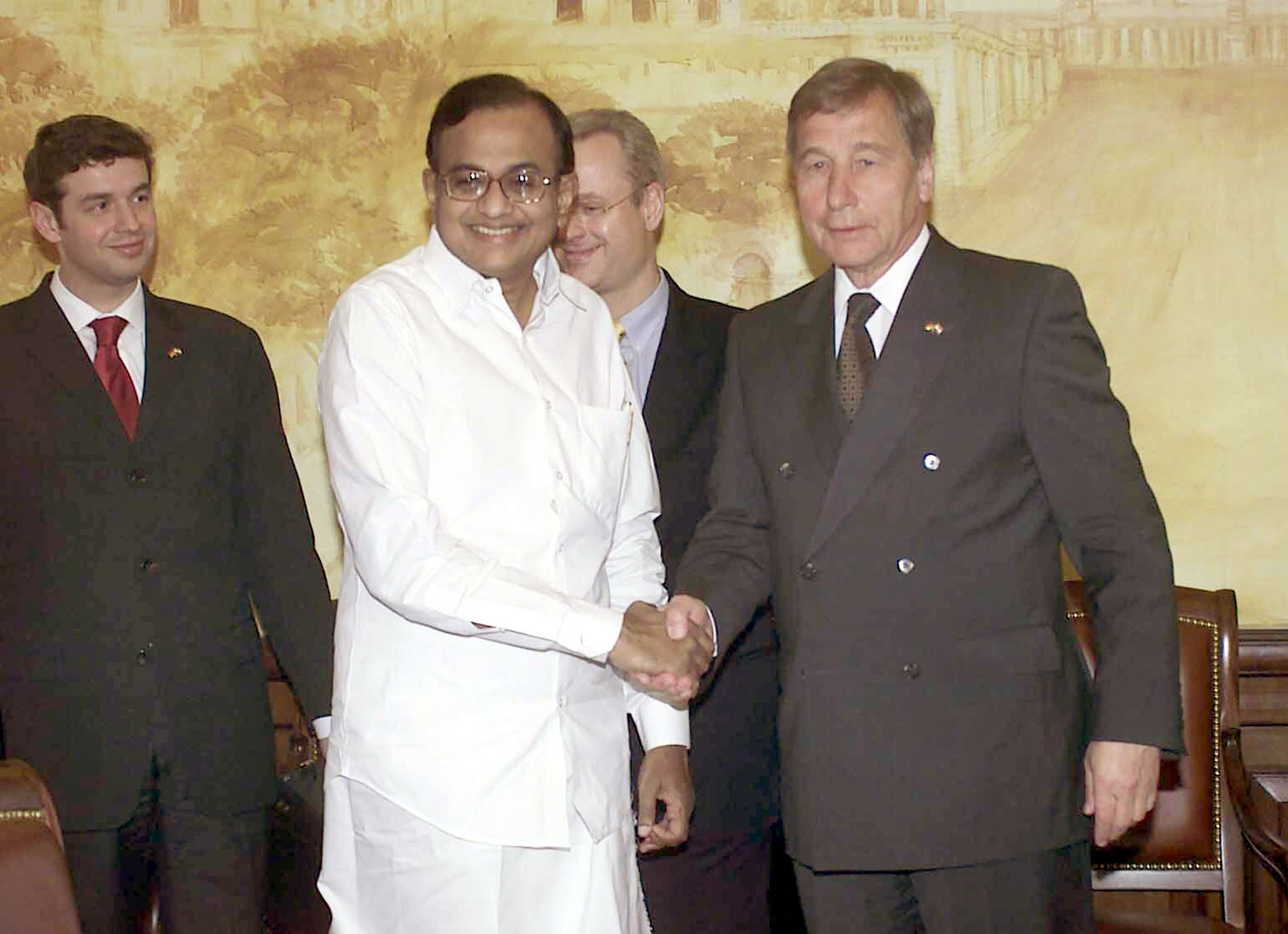
Wolfgang Clement with the then Indian Union Finance Minister, P. Chidambaram during a ministerial state visit to New Delhi, India. (April 2005)

After the 2002 federal elections, Clement was part of the Social Democrats’ team in negotiations with the Green Party on a new coalition agreement for a government under the leadership of Chancellor Gerhard Schröder. He gave up his office of Minister-President of NRW on 21 October 2002 and was appointed Federal Minister of Economics and Labour in the new government led by Schröder. In this role, he was taking over the newly created so-called “super ministry” that had been formed by the amalgamation of the Economic and Labour ministries.

The prevailing social democratic thinking in Europe was re-shaped by the Schröder-Blair paper of 1999, a joint working paper between German Chancellor Gerhard Schröder and British Prime Minister Tony Blair, which introduced the "third way" or "Neue Mitte" in that a social democratic future required a comprehensive economization of society with the state withdrawing from the markets and other welfare measures. This represented an abrupt U-turn with respect to the exiting programs of the SPD. In continuation of this thinking, Schröder and Clement, came up with the Agenda 2010 series of reforms where the economy was given more freedom, and labor market reforms starting with the Hartz I through IV programs were introduced. Agenda 2010 was announced as the single largest reform efforts in post-war Germany, and included a set of actions that sought to rethink how the government organized education, social security, and employment. The market reforms relaxed labor market restrictions and reduced social benefits in a bid to boost employment. The reforms emerged to be a divisive topic in Germany with a section of the business community stating that these reforms laid the foundation for the sustainable and employment intensive recovery that took off in 2005. The labor and welfare reforms have been credited with reducing unemployment and contributing to Germany's growth years. However, the reforms led to a rift between the left and centrist sections of the SPD, driven by oppositions from the trade unions and social organizations, ultimately resulting in the split Germany's center-left, and led to the founding of the party WASG in 2005, which subsequently formed an electoral alliance with and in 2007 merged with the PDS to form the party Die Linke (The Left).

Following the 2005 elections, Angela Merkel was elected Chancellor on 22 November 2005, and Clement was replaced by Michael Glos.

On 31 July 2008, Clement was expelled from the SPD by the Landesschiedskommission (i.e. State arbitration board) of NRW after making a statement in which he advised against voting for the SPD. Clement went to the superior Bundesschiedskommission (Federal arbitration board) which subsequently cancelled the verdict on 24 November 2008. On 25 November, Clement announced his decision to leave the party. He went on to support the Free Democratic Party led by Christian Lindner, but did not join the party.

== Life after politics ==
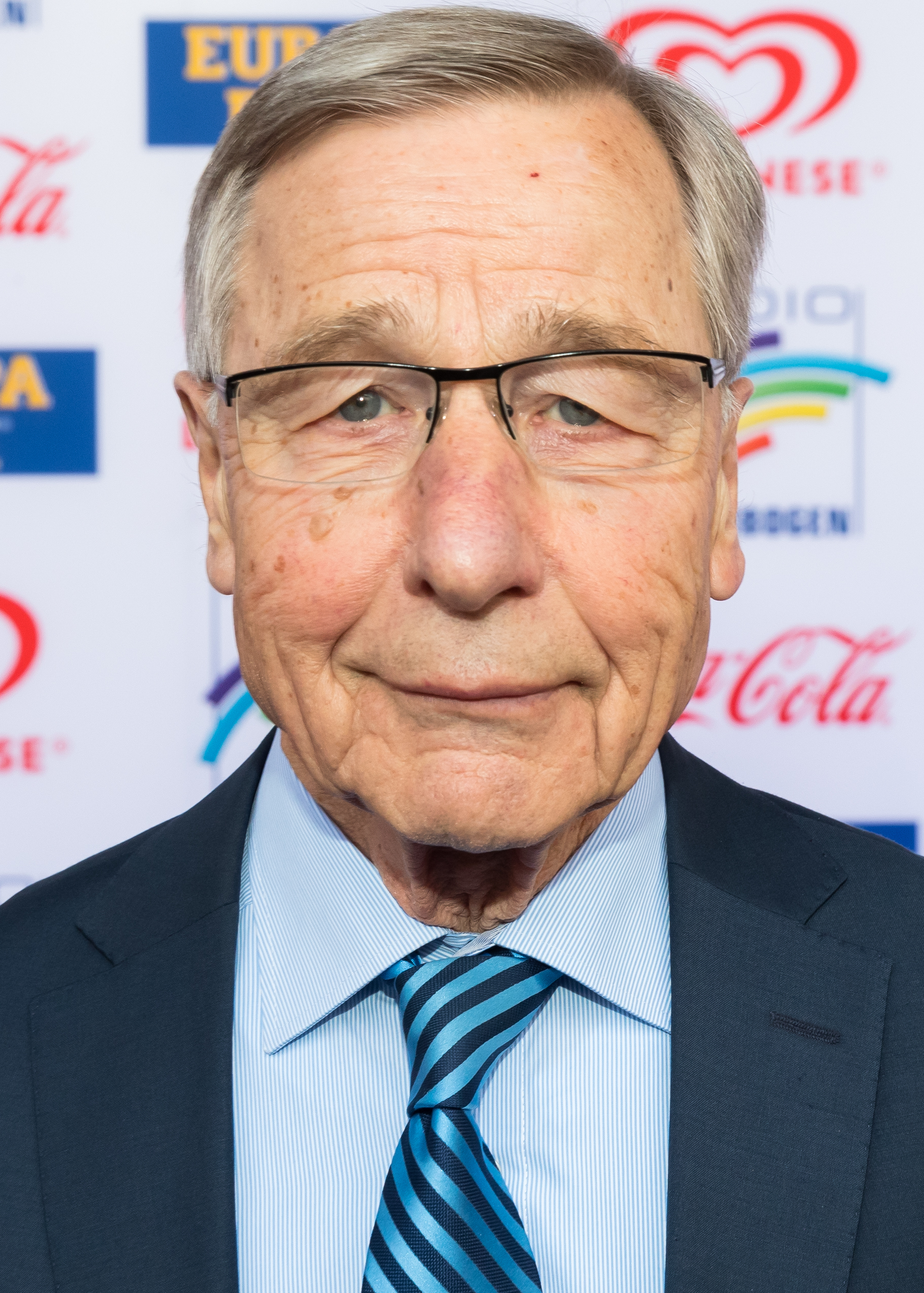
Clement in 2019

After leaving politics, Clement held various paid and unpaid positions. In 2006, he was appointed by the employers' and employees' organizations of Germany's construction sector – the German Construction Confederation (ZDB), the Central Federation of the German Construction Industry (HDB), and IG Bauen-Agrar-Umwelt (IG BAU) to mediate in a dispute over salary increases. In 2018, he again helped the two sides to agree on a pay hike of roughly 6 percent for more than 800,000 construction workers.

In 2007, Clement was awarded the Mercator Visiting Professorship for Political Management at the Universität Essen-Duisburg's NRW School of Governance.

In 2017, Federal Minister of Health Hermann Gröhe appointed Clement as Special Commissioner for Germany's candidacy to become the new headquarters of the European Medicines Agency (EMA). He was also an honorary member of the International Raoul Wallenberg Foundation.

In addition, he was a member of multiple corporate boards and non-profit organizations (below):

=== Corporate boards ===
- Deutsche Wohnen AG, Member of the Supervisory Board (since 2011)
- Peter Dussmann Foundation, Member of the Board of Trustees (since 2011)
- Energy Consulting Group, Member of the Board of Directors (since 2009)
- Daldrup & Söhne AG, Chairman of the Supervisory Board (since 2008)
- Citigroup, Member of the German Advisory Board (since 2006)
- M. DuMont Schauberg, Member of the Supervisory Board (since 2006)
- Wolters Kluwer Deutschland, Chairman of the Advisory Board (since 2006)
- Dussmann Verwaltungs AG, Member of the Supervisory Board (since 2005)
- RiverRock, Member of the Advisory Board (since 2009)
- RSBK Strategie Beratung Kommunikation AG, Member of the Advisory Board
- Shepard Fox Communications, Chairman of the Advisory Board
- DIS AG, Member of the Supervisory Board (until 2016)

=== Non-profits ===
- Ostinstitut Wismar, Chairman of the Board
- Bonner Akademie für Forschung und Lehre praktischer Politik (BAPP), Member of the Board of Trustees
- German Cancer Research Center (DKFZ), Member of the Advisory Council
- Institute of Energy Economics at the University of Cologne, Member of the Advisory Board
- Institute for Energy, Economics and Energy Law at the University of Bochum, Board of Trustees
- Hertie School of Governance, Member of the Board of Trustees
- Friends of the Berlin State Opera, Member of the Board of Trustees
- Free Democratic Party (FDP), Member of the Business Forum

== Personal life ==
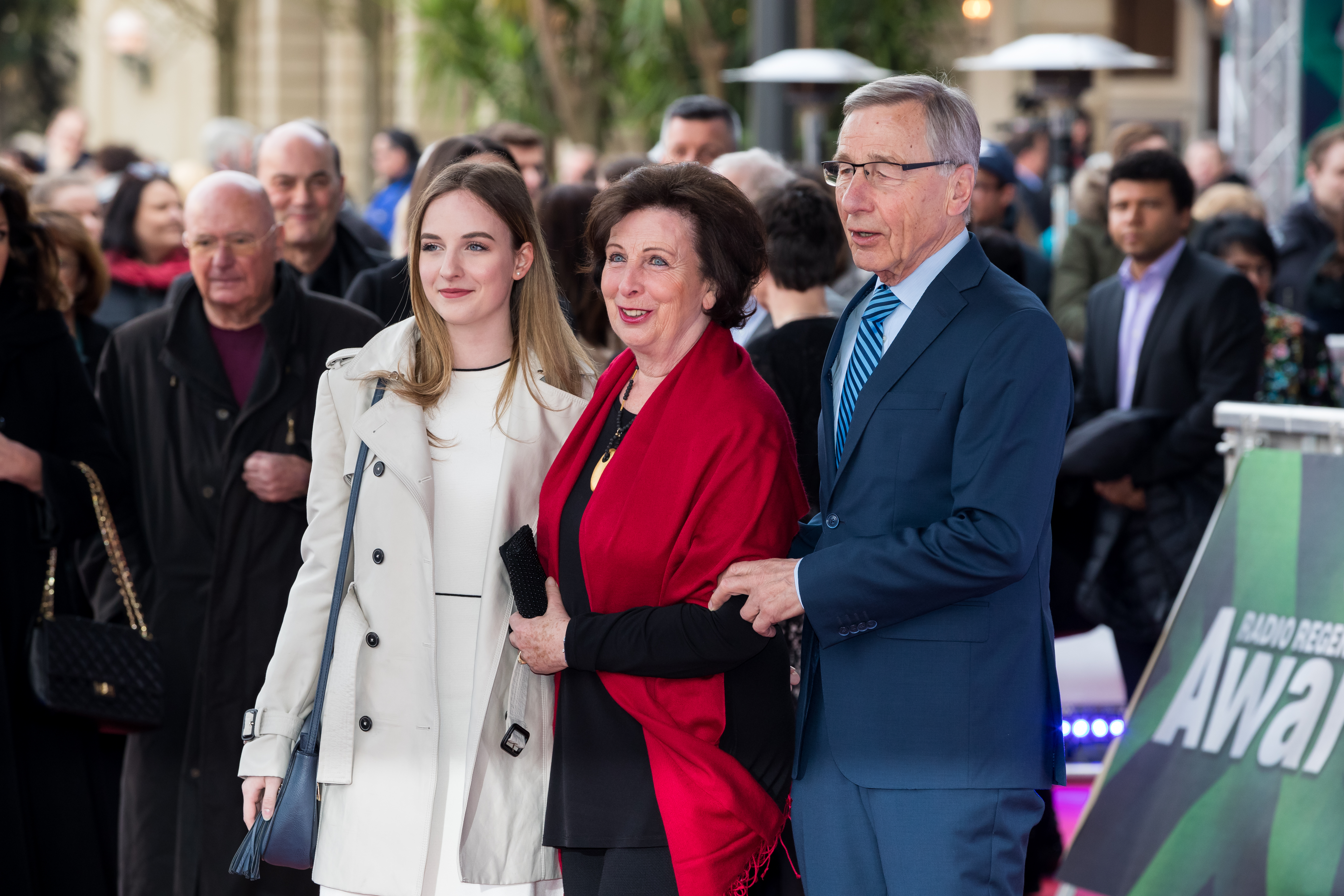
Wolfgang Clement during the Radio Regenbogen Award 2019 at Europapark, Rust, Baden-Württemberg, Germany (April 2019)

Wolfgang Clement married his wife, Karin, in 1966 and went on to have five daughters and thirteen granddaughters.

Clement's work ethic was praised by colleagues across both sides of the aisle. Peer Steinbrück his successor as the President Minister of NRW, recollecting their time together in NRW, noted that he could work with a "sensationally low need for sleep" working at his desk until 11 PM before heading out to Rhöndorf in Düsseldorf's old town for Altbiers, before returning to work at 7AM. Der Spiegel noted that "Er könne zwölf Glas Bier schneller trinken als andere zwölf Korn." or that "he could drink twelve glasses of beer faster than others could drink twelve shots". He had also won a beer drinking contest, by downing a glass of Kölsch beer in 1.5 seconds at a German beer association ceremony in Cologne being held at the 487th anniversary of the Beer purity law, or Reinheitsgebot, in 2003. In his own words, the secret was "Man muss nur das Zäpfchen zurückklappen!" or that "You just have to fold back the uvula!"

Clement died at his home in Bonn on 27 September 2020, at the age of 80. He had been suffering from lung cancer.

== See also ==
- Hartz plan
- Agenda 2010

Political offices
Preceded by Johannes Rau (SPD)	Minister President of North Rhine-Westphalia; 1998–2002	Succeeded by Peer Steinbrück (SPD)
