= Labour and Social Justice – The Electoral Alternative =

Left-wing German political party

Labour and Social Justice – The Electoral Alternative Arbeit und soziale Gerechtigkeit – Die Wahlalternative
- Leader: Klaus Ernst, Thomas Händel, Christine Buchholz, Axel Troost
- Founded: 22 January 2005
- Dissolved: 16 June 2007
- Split from: Social Democratic Party of Germany
- Merged into: Die Linke
- Headquarters: Königswarter Straße 16; D-90762 Fürth
- Ideology: Socialism; Trade unionism; Left-wing populism
- Political position: Left-wing

Website
- www.w-asg.de

Labour and Social Justice – The Electoral Alternative (German: Arbeit und soziale Gerechtigkeit – Die Wahlalternative, WASG) was a left-wing German political party founded in 2005 by activists disenchanted with the ruling Red-Green coalition government. On 16 June 2007, WASG merged with Party of Democratic Socialism (PDS) to form The Left (Die Linke).

The party ran for the first time in the 2005 state election of North Rhine-Westphalia, Germany's most populous state and a stronghold of the governing Social Democratic Party of Germany (SPD), with pastor Jürgen Klute as its front-runner. The party campaigned against what it considered "the neoliberal consensus" displayed by the governing centre-left political parties and the centre-right opposition alike. Some of its main issues were opposition to cuts in provision of social benefits and to the favourable taxation of the wealthy. In the first few months of existence, it received a large amount of news coverage, and had its first national convention from 6 May until 8 May 2005.

Oskar Lafontaine, a former major figure on the left wing of the SPD, joined the new party officially on 18 June 2005, and became their North Rhine-Westphalia frontrunner for the general election on 18 September 2005. As the necessary steps for a merger with the PDS could not be taken fast enough, he advocated an electoral alliance with WASG members on the PDS's list, to which the WASG and PDS leaderships in principle agreed on 10 June 2005. The title of this list was The Left Party.PDS, which to this end - as a matter of formality - was adopted by the PDS as its new name, because changing a name was comparatively easy.

The anticipated fusion was later made official, with the WASG and The Left Party.PDS merging on 16 June 2007 to a party called simply The Left (Die Linke) or also, colloquially, "the Left Party" (without ".PDS").

== Programmatic orientation ==
The draft programmatic orientation was strongly influenced by the memorandums of the Working group for Alternative Economical Politics, which counted one of the party's leading figures, economist Axel Troost, among its members. The programme pleaded for a policy that strengthens domestic demand and centres on social justice; part of the programme is the return to a more progressive taxation. First and foremost, the tax breaks for large corporations and high incomes introduced by the SPD-Green coalition federal government starting from 1999 would have to be abolished and the federal tax on assets, which had ceased in 1997, reintroduced. The draft programme would have to be discussed until the spring 2005.

== Historical accounts ==
=== Pre-history/Association WASG ===
The party emerged from the association "Wahlalternative Arbeit und soziale Gerechtigkeit e. V." which had been founded on 3 July 2004. The association itself had started as the merger of the groups Initiative Arbeit und soziale Gerechtigkeit (mainly by Bavarian union representatives) and the Wahlalternative ("Electoral Alternative", founded by people in Northern and Western Germany). Both groups had been founded in reaction to the government politics as laid down in the Agenda 2010 programme of the governing "Red-Green" coalition, which they consider as too neoliberal. The first meeting of the Wahlalternative took place on 5 March 2004 in the Berlin headquarters of the Confederation of German Trade Unions (DGB).

The first organisation in one of the states was founded on 17 July 2004 in the Saarland; the first convention in North Rhine-Westphalia took place on 17 October 2004, and it was decided to take part in the 2005 regional elections in that state in spite of the party's unclear financial situation.

The association WAsG e. V., the party's "birthplace", continued to exist along with the party; its future purpose had still not been determined. It may be transferred into a political foundation similar to the ones kept by other German political parties.

=== News coverage ===
The nascent party drew attention in the mass media because the foundation of a new left-wing party might have led to a schism in the SPD. Forerunners to such a development were the secession of the Independent Social Democratic Party of Germany (USPD) during World War I, the foundation of the Greens (although these were not founded by disaffected SPD members) in the late 1970s, and the Democratic Socialists (DS) party founded by Karl-Heinz Hansen and Manfred Coppik in the early 1980s.

=== Foundation ===
The federal assembly in Nuremberg of the association WAsG e. V. (20 and 21 November 2004) decided to found a party, something that had never been ruled out as a possible outcome by members of the provisional leadership. After the strike vote among members in December 2004, the party was officially founded on 22 January 2005 in Göttingen. The party's name came into being as Arbeit und soziale Gerechtigkeit – Die Wahlalternative (the abbreviation ASG later had to be changed to WASG, due to a lawsuit).

=== Internal conflicts ===
There was a lot of controversy about the new party's political orientation among its members. While some liked to establish it as a purely leftist party of socialist inclination, many others, especially union representatives and former SPD members, aimed to provide a home also for social conservatives and religious people who believe in a strong welfare state. The argument escalated in February 2005 (shortly after the party's foundation); however, it was soothed through a compromise that was satisfactory for everyone. The compromise calls for a strict accord with welfare state orientation without excluding more socialist-minded members from the party.

=== Regional election in North Rhine-Westphalia ===
The party decided to take part in the regional election in North Rhine-Westphalia, Germany's most populous state, on 22 May 2005. Eligibility was ensured in all regional counties, and pastor Jürgen Klute of Herne was the leading candidate of a 40-person-ticket.

In this regional election, the WASG reached 2.2% of the votes cast (approximately 182,000 votes).

=== Lawsuit against the abbreviation ASG ===
According to a decision made by the District Court of Düsseldorf, the party was no longer allowed to officially use its abbreviation "ASG". The party had been sued by the Arbeitsgemeinschaft Sozialpädagogik und Gesellschaftsbild (ASG). As a result the abbreviation WASG" has been unofficially adopted – with an equally unofficial slight reordering of the words in its name to fit the new abbreviation.

=== Electoral alliance with the PDS ===
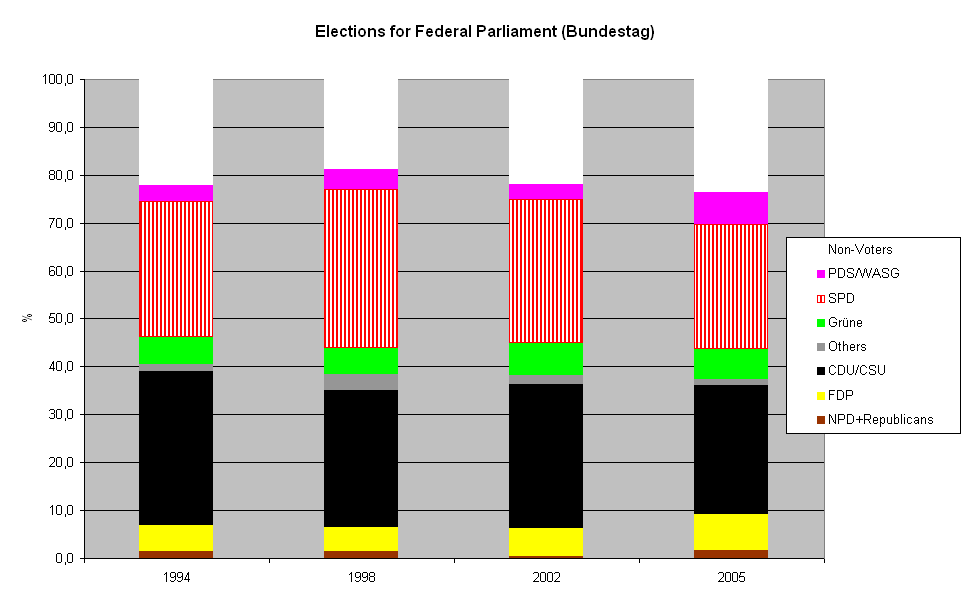
Federal elections results

After the crushing defeat of his SPD in the state elections in North Rhine-Westphalia, Federal Chancellor Schröder declared the intention of going for a general election as soon as possible, avoiding the completion of the regular term – which was to run until September 2006 – by the device of failing a Motion of Confidence vote, which took place on 1 July 2005. However, there were major constitutional issues which were to be settled by the Federal Constitutional Court of Germany. According to the Basic Law for the Federal Republic of Germany, which incorporates lessons learned from the failed Weimar Republic, the Bundestag cannot dissolve itself or be dissolved by a political representative ahead of schedule, except under very rare circumstances.

While the WASG hoped to gain a large enough membership and to raise enough money for an election campaign by the originally scheduled election date (some time in September 2006), it now faced the difficulty of an early election one year ahead of schedule – occurring on the date of 18 September 2005. Polls predicted an election result of at most 3% for the new party, well below the electoral threshold of 5%. In that situation, the idea of an electoral coalition with the ideologically similar Party of Democratic Socialism (PDS), led by Gregor Gysi, was put forward by Oskar Lafontaine.

On 10 June 2005, the leaderships of WASG and the PDS agreed to form an electoral alliance for the then-upcoming federal elections in September 2005. According to the agreement, the parties would not compete against one another in any district, and followed a joint electoral manifesto. This was intended to benefit both parties, because the WASG was based primarily in western Germany, while the PDS, which was the legal successor to the East German Socialist Unity Party (SED), was strongest in the East. Lafontaine, the former chairman of the SPD, was the WASG's lead candidate.

After a multitude of initial problems due to the somewhat restrictive German electoral law, the PDS re-christened itself as Die Linkspartei (The Left Party) and appeared on the ballot as either Die Linkspartei.PDS – in the Eastern states – or Die Linkspartei. – in the Western states – in line with the WASG's wishes. WASG candidates appeared on those electoral lists.

As of 5 July 2005, the coalition was at 30% in the polls in the East (level with the CDU there), and 11% nationally. In the Federal Election the Left Party gained 8.7% of the votes and 54 Members of the Bundestag, including 12 of the WASG.

In March 2006, however, divisions emerged between the WASG and the PDS – now The Left Party.PDS – in Berlin and the East more generally, in the run-up to state elections, due to the continuing involvement of the PDS with the SPD in coalition governments which were instituting cut-backs. The WASG Berlin, against advice or pressure from the national party leadership, announced its intention to run separate lists in Berlin against the PDS. The WASG list won 2.9% of the vote in the 17 September elections. The fusion process brought a significant loss in party memberships of WASG.

== Elections ==
=== Federal Parliament (Bundestag) ===
Election year	# of constituency votes	# of party list votes	% of party list vote	# of overall seats won	+/−	Notes
2005^{[a]}	3,764,168	4,118,194	8.7 (#4)	54 / 614	New	

- ^{a} under "The Left.PDS" alliance

== See also ==
- Politics of Germany
