= Bärbel Höhn =

German politician (born 1952)

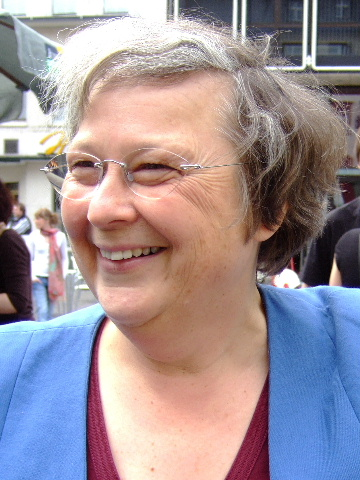

Member of the Federal Diet of Germany
- In office 2005–2017

State Minister for Agriculture of Northrhine-Westphalia
- In office 17 July 1995 – 24 June 2005
- Preceded by: Klaus Matthiesen
- Succeeded by: Eckhard Uhlenberg

Member of the North Rhine-Westphalia House of Deputies
- In office 1990–1995

Personal details
- Born: 4 May 1952 (age 74) Flensburg, Schleswig-Holstein
- Party: Alliance '90/The Greens
- Education: University of Kiel
- Profession: Economist
- Website: www.baerbel-hoehn.de

Bärbel Höhn (born 4 May 1952) is a German politician for Alliance '90/The Greens. She was elected to the Bundestag in the 2005 national elections, after serving as State Minister of Agriculture of North Rhine-Westphalia from 1995 to 2005.

== Early life and education ==
Born in Flensburg, Höhn attended the University of Kiel, majoring in mathematics and economics, and earned her Diplom in 1976. From 1978 to 1990 she was a research assistant at the University of Duisburg-Essen.

== Political career ==
Höhn began her political career as an activist in a local initiative against air pollution and as a city councilor in her home town of Oberhausen. In 1985, she joined Alliance '90/The Greens, and gained a seat in the Landtag of North Rhine-Westphalia in 1990.

=== State Minister for Environment and Agriculture in North Rhine-Westphalia, 1995-2005 ===
In the fifth cabinet of Johannes Rau, Höhn became Minister for Environment and Agriculture, serving in that position under Rau's successor Wolfgang Clement until 2005. In that capacity, she played a leadership role in Europe's response to the mad cow disease epidemic in 2001, improved consumer rights and promoted energy efficiency and renewable sources of energy. Höhn has long criticized the industrial production methods of German farmers.

Even before entering the German Bundestag, Höhn was a Green Party delegate to the Federal Convention for the purpose of electing the President of Germany in May 2004.

=== Member of the German Bundestag, 2005-2017 ===
Höhn first became a member of the German Bundestag in the 2005 federal election. She first served as chairwoman of the Committee on Committee on Food, Agriculture and Consumer Protection from 2005 to 2006. Between 2006 and 2013, she was vice-chair of the Green Party's parliamentary group – then led by co-chairs Renate Künast and Fritz Kuhn (2005-2009) or Jürgen Trittin (2009-2013), respectively – and headed its working group on environmental, energy, transport, agricultural and consumer policy. From 2005, she was also deputy chairwoman of the German-Brazilian Parliamentary Friendship Group. Between 2009 and 2013, she was part of the Parliamentary Friendship Group for Relations with the Baltic States.

Following the 2013 federal elections, Höhn stated that agreeing to a coalition with Chancellor Angela Merkel would be a "kamikaze" act for the Green Party. Exploratory coalition talks with Merkel's Christian Democratic Union ended soon after, without results.

From 2014, Höhn served as chairwoman of the Committee on the Environment, Nature Conservation and Nuclear Safety. Having participated in various UN climate conferences, she was a regular speaker at international climate and energy conventions.

Only a few days before a trip to the 2014 United Nations Climate Change Conference in Lima, the Ecuadorian government banned a parliamentary delegation led by Höhn from entering the country. Höhn and her group had planned to visit the Yasuni National Park and meet with people opposed to drilling there.

In April 2016, Höhn announced that she would not stand in the 2017 federal elections but instead resign from active politics by the end of the parliamentary term.

== Life after politics ==
Since November 2017, Höhn has been acting as unpaid Commissioner for Energy Reform in Africa for the Federal Ministry of Economic Cooperation and Development.

== Other activities ==
- German Federal Environmental Foundation (DBU), Member of the Board of Trustees
- GLOBE Germany, Member of the Board
- German-Brazilian Society (DBG), Member of the Board of Trustees
- German Council on Foreign Relations (DGAP), Chairwoman of the Study Group on Global Issues
- Development and Peace Foundation (SEF), Member of the Board of Trustees (2005-2009)
- ver.di, Member
