= Jürgen Rüttgers =

German politician, Minister-President of North Rhine-Westphalia from 2005 to 2010

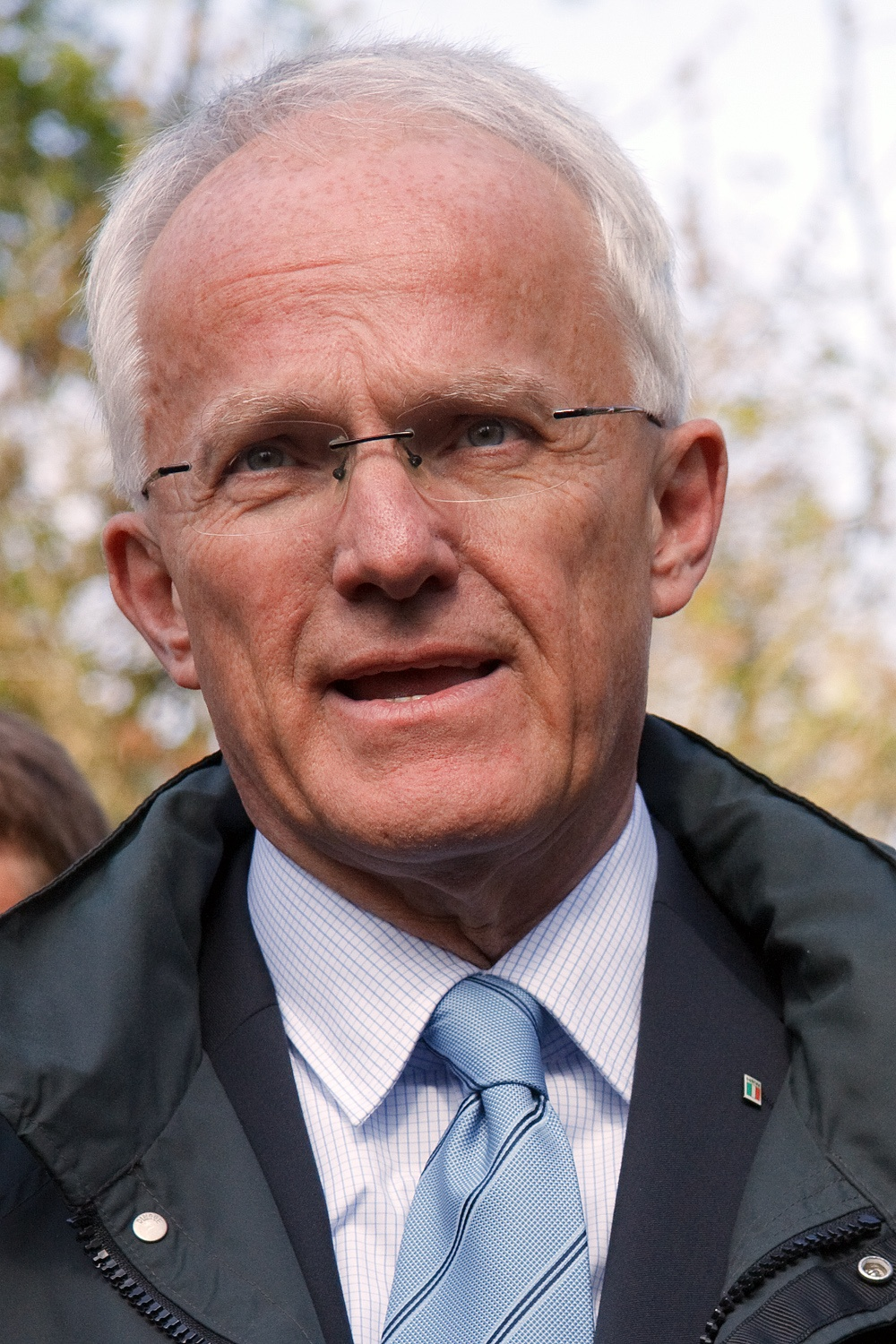
- Rüttgers in 2010

Minister-President of North Rhine-Westphalia
- In office 22 June 2005 – 14 July 2010
- President: Horst Köhler; Christian Wulff
- Chancellor: Gerhard Schröder; Angela Merkel
- Deputy: Andreas Pinkwart
- Preceded by: Peer Steinbrück
- Succeeded by: Hannelore Kraft

Federal Minister of Education, Science, Research, and Technology (Germany)
- In office 17 November 1994 – 14 October 1998
- President: Richard von Weizsäcker; Roman Herzog
- Chancellor: Helmut Kohl
- Preceded by: Paul Krüger (Science, Research and Technology); Karl-Hans Laermann (Education)
- Succeeded by: Edelgard Bulmahn (Education, Science and Research); Werner Müller (Technology)

Chairman of the North Rhein-Westfalia CDU
- In office 29 January 1999 – 6 November 2010
- Preceded by: Norbert Blüm
- Succeeded by: Norbert Röttgen

Personal details
- Born: Jürgen Anton Rüttgers; 26 June 1951 (age 75) Cologne, West Germany
- Party: Christian Democratic Union (CDU)
- Website: juergen-ruettgers.de

Jürgen Anton Rüttgers (born 26 June 1951) is a German politician of the Christian Democratic Union (CDU) who served as the 9th Minister-President of North Rhine-Westphalia from 2005 to 2010.

== Education ==
Rüttgers was born in Cologne. He holds degrees in Law and History from the University of Cologne and a Dr. Jur. (PhD) in Law (1979). He became a member of K.D.St. V. Rappoltstein Köln, a Catholic student fraternity that is member of the Cartellverband.

== Political career ==
=== Career in national politics ===
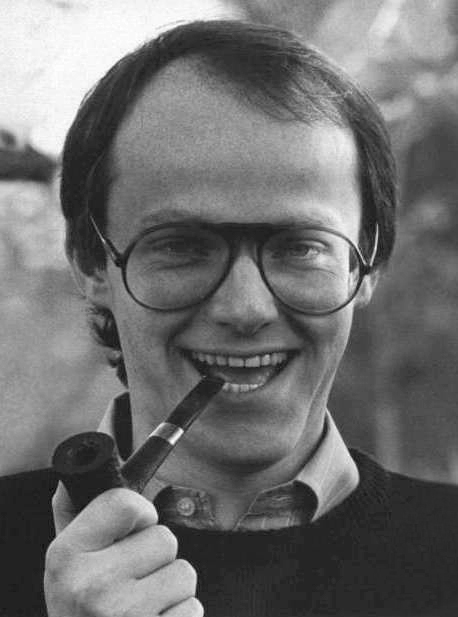
Rüttgers in 1977

Rüttgers was a Member of the German Bundestag from 1987 until 2000. In 1991 he succeeded Friedrich Bohl as First Secretary of the parliamentary group, in this position assisting the parliamentary group's chairman Wolfgang Schäuble.

Rüttgers served as Federal Minister for Education, Science, Research and Technology in Chancellor Helmut Kohl's fifth cabinet from 1994 to 1998. During his time as minister, he was – together with Luigi Berlinguer (Italy), Claude Allègre (France), and Baroness Tessa Blackstone (United Kingdom) – one of the heads of the "Sorbonne declaration", the joint declaration on harmonisation of the architecture of the European higher education system, on 25 May 1998. That was the starting point of the so-called "Bologna process". He also successfully introduced a law under which online providers can be prosecuted for offering a venue for content illegal in Germany – such as child pornography or Nazi propaganda – if they do so knowingly and it is "technically possible and reasonable" to prevent it. Also, the law made Germany the first country to set rules for so-called digital signatures and give them the status of a legal document.

Between 1998 and 2000, Rüttgers served as deputy chairman of the CDU/CSU parliamentary group, again under Schäuble's leadership.

=== Career in state politics ===
In 2000, Rüttgers succeeded Norbert Blüm as chairman of the CDU in the state of North Rhine-Westphalia. As head of the party in Germany's most populous state, he commanded considerable influence, especially with its grassroots. He also became the party's group leader in the state parliament. In this capacity, he notably opposed the takeover of Mannesmann by the British telecommunications company Vodafone in 2000, one of the largest-ever company takeovers worldwide.

Amid the revelations of the CDU donations scandal in early 2000, Rüttgers – who ran as the party's candidate in a crucial state election in North Rhine-Wesphalia that year – was one of the few leading figures who remained loyal to former Chancellor Helmut Kohl even after prosecutors began a criminal investigation into Kohl's financial dealings. By January 2000, daily newspaper Süddeutsche Zeitung claimed that Kohl, angered by party chairman Wolfgang Schäuble's efforts to distance himself from the scandal surrounding secret payments to the party, was encouraging Rüttgers to make a bid for the leadership at the CDU's annual conference; instead, Angela Merkel was elected as Schäuble's successor and Rüttgers became one of her four deputies, alongside Volker Rühe, Annette Schavan and Christian Wulff.

In his role as chairman of the CDU in North Rhine-Westphalia, Rüttgers later publicly endorsed Merkel as the party's candidate to challenge incumbent Chancellor Gerhard Schröder in the 2002 federal elections; instead, Edmund Stoiber ended up being the joint candidate of CDU and CSU.

=== Minister-President of North Rhine-Westphalia ===
In the 2005 state elections, Rüttgers was the opposition Christian Democratic Union's front-runner for the second time. After both CDU and FDP won a majority of seats in the elections, they formed a coalition to take over government from the former SPD and Green party coalition led by Peer Steinbrück. Rüttgers was elected Minister-President of North Rhine-Westphalia on 22 June, the state's first CDU Minister-President in 39 years. His cabinet, notably included representatives of the CDU's more liberal wing, such as Armin Laschet (as State Minister for Generations, Family, Women and Integration) and Karl-Josef Laumann (as State Minister of Labor, Health and Social Affairs).

On the national level, Rüttgers was part of the CDU/CSU team in the negotiations with the SPD on a coalition agreement following the 2005 federal elections, which paved the way to the formation of Chancellor Angela Merkel's first government. Under the leadership of Merkel as party chairwoman, he was re-elected vice-chairman of the CDU in November 2006, this time alongside Roland Koch, Annette Schavan and Christian Wulff.

During his time in office, Rüttgers came under severe criticism for failing to mend the state's public finances. One of the reasons was the crisis at the state-owned lender WestLB, which led his government to set aside 1.5 billion in 2008. Rüttgers long wanted the bank to stay independent and categorically ruled out a merger with LBBW. However, by 2007, he and Roland Koch, his counterpart from the state of Hesse, agreed on approving a merger of their respective state-owned banks, WestLB and Landesbank Hessen-Thüringen (Helaba). WestLB was eventually broken up in 2012 after years of losses and controversy.

Also in 2007, Rüttgers helped negotiate an agreement on closing Germany's last anthracite mines and clearing the way for the stock market flotation of the mines' owner, RAG AG, at the time the largest German coal producer and an international chemicals, energy and real estate conglomerate.

Between 2007 and 2009, Rüttgers was one of 32 members of the Second Commission on the modernization of the federal state, which had been established to reform the division of powers between federal and state authorities in Germany.

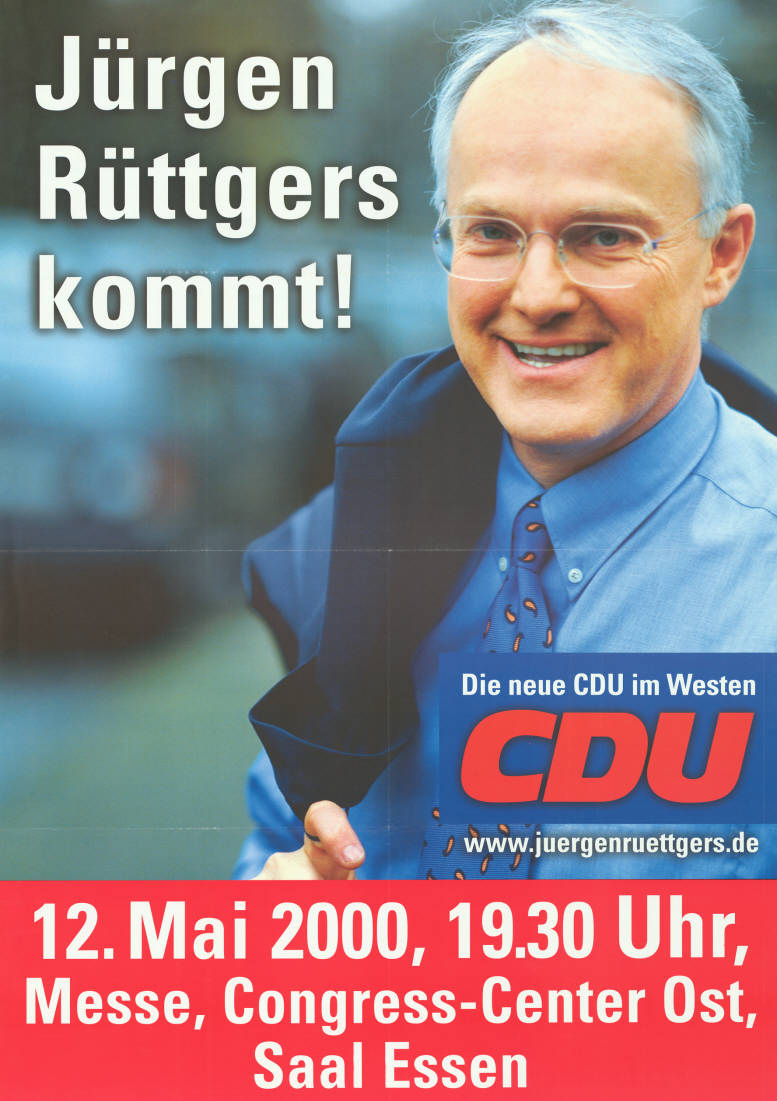
Rüttgers on a 2000 poster of the CDU

Shortly before the 2010 state elections, Rüttgers's public image was damaged by a party fund-raising scandal, and local issues like education and the troubles of municipalities with heavy debt burdens were central to the campaign. He led his party to an electoral defeat; the steep drop of 10 percentage points compared with the previous election, in 2005, was even larger than most analysts had predicted and gave the Christian Democrats their worst postwar showing in that state. The loss also meant Chancellor Merkel could no longer count on a majority for her governing coalition in the Bundesrat, composed of delegations from all 16 states. In July 2010, Rüttgers stepped down as caretaker premier and also gave up his position as state party chairman.

== Life after politics ==
Rüttgers joined the Düsseldorf office of German law firm Beiten Burkhardt as Of Counsel in March 2011. In this capacity, he is a member of the firm's Assets, Succession, Foundations practice group and also advises international companies on investments in Germany and German companies on international investments.

In May 2011, Deutsche Bahn nominated Rüttgers as executive director of the Brussels-based Community of European Railway and Infrastructure Companies (CER); instead, Libor Lochman was eventually appointed to the position.

Rüttgers was a CDU delegate to the Federal Convention for the purpose of electing the President of Germany in 2017 and 2022.

Since 2021, Rüttgers has been a member of the so-called Limbach Commission (Advisory Commission on the return of cultural property seized as a result of Nazi persecution, especially Jewish property), a panel convened by the German government to give recommendations on restitution claims regarding art works stolen or purchased under duress by the Nazis.

In addition, Rüttgers has held several paid and unpaid positions since leaving politics, including the following:

- 321–2021: 1700 Years of Jewish Life in Germany, Chair of the Board of Trustees (since 2018)
- CFC Industriebeteiligungen AG, Member of the Supervisory Board (since 2011)
- Gothaer Lebensversicherung AG, Member of the Supervisory Board (2016–2023)
- Auschwitz-Birkenau Foundation, Member of the Foundation Council
- Brost-Stiftung, Member of the Board of Trustees
- Deutsche Telekom Stiftung, Member of the Board of Trustees
- Konrad Adenauer Foundation (KAS), Member of the Board

== Political positions ==
During his political career, Rüttgers proved to be a conservative on social issues such as immigration. He also positioned himself as a "workers' leader" on economics, defending labor rights and opposing business demands for deregulation of the economy. Unlike many in his party at the time, he was also in favor of expanding day care for young children and supported all-day schools. Following the CDU's performance in the 2005 federal elections and the formation of the first government under Chancellor Merkel, Rüttgers blamed her campaign for talking "too much about flat tax and not enough about the people." Instead, he called on the party to shed its "capitalist" image.

In his 1993 book Dinosaurs of Democracy, Rüttgers attacked Germany's main parties and the government for being unwilling to decentralise political power to ordinary people.

== Controversy ==
Rüttgers is widely known for his views on immigration and the much-discussed phrase "Kinder statt Inder" ("children instead of Indians") which was a media interpretation of "Statt Inder an die Computer müssen unsere Kinder an die Computer" ("instead of Indians in front of computers, our children must be in front of computers"), during an election campaign (which he eventually lost) at a time when there was a parallel nationwide discussion about whether or not immigration rules should be liberalised on behalf of attracting more highly qualified foreign academics to the German labor market.

In response to Rüttgers's much-discussed phrase Kinder statt Inder, Germany's Green Party overwhelmed his Internet mailbox with thousands of messages. The Internet attack was the first of its kind in German politics.

== Recognition ==
=== Honors and awards ===
- 1997 – Georg Schulhoff Award
- 1997 – Grand Cross of the Order of Merit of the Federal Republic of Germany
- 2004 – In collaboration with the Ministers of Education Luigi Berlinguer (Italy), Claude Allègre (France) and Baroness Tessa Blackstone (Great Britain), Jürgen Rüttgers was one of the heads of the Sorbonne Declaration, with the aim of "harmonising the architecture of the European Higher Education system". For their achievements in European education and research, Rüttgers and his colleagues received an honorary doctorate from Roma Tre University in Rome in 2004.
- 2004 – European Craft Award
- 2007 – Rident Red Tape Award of the DBB civil servant union and tariff union
- 2008 – Commander of the Legion of Honor
- 2009 – Grand Cross of the Order of Merit Pro Merito Melitensi of the sovereign Order of Malta
- 2010 – Orden wider den tierischen Ernst (Order against dead seriousness)
- 2010 – Grand Officer of the Order of Orange-Nassau
- 2015 – Commander Cross of the Order of Merit of the Republic of Poland

=== Honorary degrees ===
- 2007 – Honorary doctorate from Waseda University
- 2008 – Honorary Professor of Ben Gurion University
- 2014 – Honorary Professorship of the Rheinische Friedrich-Wilhelms-Universität Bonn

Political offices
Preceded by Peer Steinbrück	Minister-President of North Rhine-Westphalia; 2005–2010	Succeeded by Hannelore Kraft
