= Agenda 2010 =

Reforms executed by the German government

The Agenda 2010 is a series of reforms planned and executed by the German government in the early 2000s, under a Social Democrats/Greens coalition at that time, which aimed to reform the German welfare system and labour relations. The declared objective of Agenda 2010 was to promote economic growth and thus reduce unemployment.

== Overview ==
On 14 March 2003, Chancellor Gerhard Schröder gave a speech before the German Bundestag outlining the proposed plans for reform. He pointed out three main areas which the agenda would focus on: the economy, the system of social security, and Germany's position on the world market.

German finance minister Hans Eichel had the responsibility of implementing socially unpopular measures including tax cuts (such as a 25% reduction in the basic rate of income tax), cuts in the cost absorption for medical treatment and drastic cuts in pension benefits, and cuts in unemployment benefits. The measures were ostensibly proposed in accordance with the market liberalisation approach adopted by the EU's Lisbon Strategy. The name Agenda 2010 itself is a reference to the Lisbon Strategy's 2010 deadline.

The plan was strongly promoted by the Bertelsmann media group.

A series of changes in the labour market known as the Hartz plan started in 2003 and the last step, Hartz IV, came into effect on 1 January 2005. These changes affected unemployment benefits and job centers in Germany, and the very nature of the German system of social security.

== Consequences ==
The immediate aftermath of the Agenda 2010 reforms was that unemployment rose to over 5.2 million people in February 2005 and Schröder called German companies "lazy" for failing to hire more workers. Beginning in 2005, however, unemployment figures began falling and, in May 2007, unemployment was at 3.8 million people, a 5½ year low. The apparent success of Agenda 2010 in reducing unemployment in Germany has been cited in the debate over extending long-term unemployment insurance benefits in the United States.

A debate about the socioeconomic results of the Agenda 2010 reforms was stirred by the release of a study conducted by the Friedrich Ebert Foundation in late 2006. The study classified 4 percent of people living in West Germany as well as 20 percent of people living in East Germany as living in "precarious" socio-economic conditions. Although the topic of social conditions in Germany was much debated as a result of this study, with many people (including those in Schröder's own party) laying blame on Schröder and his Hartz IV reforms for the growing economic inequality in Germany, no policy changes have been enacted as a direct result of the study.

By 2008, the wage share of national income had reached a 50-year low of 64.5%.

Another sign that economic inequality has risen in Germany can be seen in the fact that the number of Germans living below the poverty line has increased from 11% in 2001, to 12.3% in 2004, and about 14% in 2007. According to 2007 government statistics, one out of every six children was poor, a post-1960-record, with more than a third of all children poor in big cities like Berlin, Hamburg and Bremen.

Voters seemed to respond to the Agenda 2010 and Hartz IV reforms negatively. In the 2004 elections to the EU parliament, the SPD reached an all-time postwar national election low of only 21% of the votes.

The SPD lost by a wide margin in the 2005 regional election in its North Rhine-Westphalia "heartland", where the regional SPD government was replaced by a CDU-FDP coalition, giving the winners a working majority in the Bundesrat, the federal legislature's upper house. The Social Democrats losses were widely attributed to voters' discontent with the Agenda 2010 reforms.

Subsequently, Chancellor Schröder triggered a loss in a confidence vote, which, in turn, necessitated an early general election. In the autumn of 2005, one year ahead of schedule, general elections were held and the Social Democrats were defeated.

By 2011, unemployment had fallen from its 10% average of the mid-decade to around 7%, its lowest since the early 1990s.

Some scientists see the wage depression in Germany fostered by the Agenda 2010 as one of the causes of the European debt crisis.

== See also ==
- Demographics of Germany
- Politics of Germany
