= Selmer =

Selmer may refer to:

- Selmer (surname)
- Selmer (given name)
- Selmer, Tennessee, United States, a town
- Selmer group, a group constructed from an isogeny of abelian varieties

== See also ==
- Conn-Selmer, a manufacturer and distributor of musical instruments
- Henri Selmer Paris, a musical instrument manufacturer, associated with Conn-Selmer
- Semler, a surname
