= Gustav Altenhain =

German publisher and politician (1891–1968)

Landtag of North Rhine-Westphalia Deputy
- In office 20 April 1947 – 12 July 1958

Bürgermeister of Haßlinghausen
- In office 1945–1946

Provincial Landtag Deputy Province of Westphalia
- In office 1927 – 1929; 1946

Personal details
- Born: 5 December 1891 Haßlinghausen, Province of Westphalia, Kingdom of Prussia, German Empire
- Died: 23 December 1968 (aged 77) Gevelsberg, North Rhine-Westphalia, West Germany
- Party: Free Democratic Party
- Other political affiliations: German Democratic Party; German State Party
- Occupation: Publisher

Gustav Altenhain (5 December 1891 – 23 December 1968) was a German publisher and politician from Westphalia who was active in the Weimar Republic with the German Democratic Party (later, the German State Party), and in post-war West Germany as a member of the Free Democratic Party (FDP).

== Early life and political career in the Weimar Republic ==
Altenhain was born in the former municipality of Haßlinghausen, now a borough of Sprockhövel in Westphalia. After attending elementary school, commercial school, and art school, Altenhain took over the management of a printing company as its owner. There is a street named after him today in Sprockhövel where his printing company was located.

Altenhain joined the German Democratic Party (DDP) in 1918 and remained after its merger with the Young German Order in 1930 that formed the German State Party. From 1925 to 1933, he served as a local representative in Haßlinghausen; from 1926 to 1933, he was a member of the Kreisausschuss (district committee) of the Ennepe-Ruhr district; from 1929 to 1933, he was a municipal representative for Haßlinghausen. Altenhain was a member of the provincial parliament of the Province of Westphalia from 1927 to 1929.

== Post-war political career in West Germany ==
After World War II, Altenhain was a deputy member of the Zonal Advisory Council in the British zone of occupation, while also serving as the Bürgermeister (mayor) of Haßlinghausen in 1945 and 1946. He was again a member of the municipal and district councils from 1945, and of the appointed provincial parliament (Landtag) from 1946. He was involved in the creation of the Liberal Democratic Party in Westphalia, which on 7 January 1946 in Opladen led to the formation of the Free Democratic Party (FDP). At its founding congress, he was elected as one of six federal vice-chairmen, confirmed in June 1947. He also became the chairman of the FDP association in Westphalia and, upon its formation in May 1947, chairman of the FDP association of North Rhine-Westphalia. However, this role was short-lived as he was seen too left wing, and he was replaced in August 1947 by Friedrich Middelhauve. He was elected as a deputy to the Landtag of North Rhine-Westphalia at the first election in April 1947 and reelected in 1950 and 1954. Overall, he served as a deputy in the provincial parliaments from 2 October 1946 until 12 July 1958. He was deputy chairman for some years, and vice chair of the Personnel Committee and vice chair of the Committee on Budget and Finance from 1950 to 1955.

From early 1952, Alterhain belonged to an intra-party group led by Carl Wirths and Karl Schneider, which sharply criticized the policy course pursued by Middelhauve and Ernst Achenbach. From 1950 to 1954, he was also second vice-president of the Landtag and, from 1953 to 1964, served as a member of the Westphalia-Lippe Regional Association, in eastern North Rhine-Westphalia. Alterhain died at Gevelsberg in December 1968.

== Sources ==
- 50 Jahre Landtag Nordrhein-Westfalen. Das Land und seine Abgeordneten. Düsseldorf 1996.
