= Günther Schwägermann =

SS adjutant for Joseph Goebbels (1915–unknown)

- Born: 24 July 1915; Uelzen, Province of Hanover, Kingdom of Prussia, German Empire
- Died: Unknown
- Military career
- Allegiance: Nazi Germany
- Branch: Waffen-SS
- Service years: 1937–1945
- Rank: SS-Hauptsturmführer
- Units: 1st SS Division Leibstandarte SS Adolf Hitler; 4th SS Polizei Division
- Conflicts: World War II

Günther August Wilhelm Schwägermann (24 July 1915; date of death unknown) served in the Nazi government of German chancellor Adolf Hitler. From approximately late 1941, Schwägermann served as the adjutant for Reich Minister of Propaganda Joseph Goebbels. He reached the rank of SS-Hauptsturmführer (captain). Schwägermann survived World War II and was held in American captivity from 25 June 1945 until 24 April 1947.

== Life up to 1945 ==
Born in Uelzen, Schwägermann attended secondary school and later joined the 1st SS Division Leibstandarte SS Adolf Hitler on 8 April 1937. He was sent to the SS-Junkerschule Bad Tölz for officers' training from October 1938 until September 1939. In late 1939 he served briefly with the Schutzpolizei in the Berlin-Mitte district. He later served with the 4th SS Polizei Division in France and Russia, and lost an eye to a Russian rifle-butt on the Eastern front. He later had it replaced by a fake eye (of which Hedwig—Goebbels' daughter—was captivated by). After this injury he became the adjutant for Joseph Goebbels and was promoted to the rank of SS-Obersturmführer. Later on 29 November 1944, he was promoted to the rank of SS-Hauptsturmführer. In January 1945, Goebbels sent Schwägermann to his villa at Lanke, ordering him to bring his wife, Magda, and their children to stay at an air raid shelter on Schwanenwerder.

== In the Reich Chancellery bunker ==
By 22 April 1945, while the Soviets were attacking Berlin, Joseph and Magda Goebbels brought their children to the Vorbunker to stay. Schwägermann came with them. Adolf Hitler had already taken up residence in the lower Führerbunker in January 1945. It was in that protected bunker complex below the Reich Chancellery garden of Berlin that Hitler and a few loyal personnel were gathered to direct the city's final defence.

By the time of Hitler's death on 30 April 1945, the Soviet Army was less than 500 metres from the bunker complex. On 1 May 1945, Goebbels arranged for an SS dentist, Helmut Kunz, to inject his six children with morphine so that when they were unconscious, an ampule of cyanide could be then crushed in each of their mouths. According to Kunz's later testimony, he gave the children morphine injections but it was Magda Goebbels and SS-Obersturmbannführer Ludwig Stumpfegger, Hitler's personal doctor, who administered the cyanide.

At around 20:30, Goebbels and his wife, Magda left the bunker and walked up to the garden of the Chancellery, where they committed suicide. There are several different accounts of this event. According to one account, Goebbels shot his wife and then himself. Another account was that they each bit on a cyanide ampule and were given a coup de grâce immediately afterwards. Schwägermann testified in 1948 that the couple walked ahead of him up the stairs and out into the Chancellery garden. He waited in the stairwell and heard the shots sound. Schwägermann then walked up the remaining stairs and once outside he saw the lifeless bodies of the couple. Following Joseph Goebbels's prior order, Schwägermann had an SS soldier fire several shots into Goebbels's body, which did not move. The bodies were then doused with petrol, but the remains were only partially burned and not buried. According to Brunhilde Pomsel, Schwägermann was the one who personally informed the occupants of the Führerbunker of the suicides of Hitler and Goebbels, as well as their respective wives.

=== Breakout ===
In one of Hitler's last orders, he had given permission for the Berlin forces to attempt a breakout of the Soviet encirclement after his death. General Helmuth Weidling, commander of the Berlin Defence Area, and SS-Brigadeführer Wilhelm Mohnke, the (Kommandant) Battle Commander for the centre government district, devised a plan to escape out from Berlin to the Allies on the western side of the Elbe or to the German Army to the North. Mohnke split up the Reich Chancellery and Führerbunker soldiers and personnel into ten main groups. Schwägermann was in one of the breakout groups of 1 May. The group, including Werner Naumann, Hans Baur, Georg Betz, Alfred Rach, and Ludwig Stumpfegger, walked underground along the U-Bahn. They were joined by Artur Axmann before surfacing at Stadtmitte station, and later by Martin Bormann. At Lehrter Bahnhof they split up, Schwägermann, Naumann, and Rach heading west along Invalidenstraße towards Moabit. They hid in industrial wasteground for several days before escaping Berlin and reaching the American Zone to the west.

== After the war ==
Schwägermann reunited with his wife in Munich and lived incognito until 25 June 1945, when the couple were reported to the Counterintelligence Corps and taken into U.S. custody. Schwägermann remained a prisoner of war in various camps until 24 April 1947.

Later in life, he lived in northern Germany. In February 1948 in Hanover he gave two interviews and a written statement about Hitler's last days, English translations of which were made for Michael Musmanno. In 1951 he was among the ex-comrades under Werner Naumann who formed the Naumann Circle and infiltrated the Lower Saxony branch of the Free Democratic Party (FDP) and got Horst Huisgen elected to its Landtag. He commented publicly in June 1954 on The Last Days of Hitler by Hugh Trevor-Roper, among whose sources was the transcript of Schwägermann's 1945–46 debriefing by the US military, but who did not himself speak to Schwägermann. In the 1950s Schwägermann founded an import–export company named Labora in Munich with Hartmann Lauterbacher's brother Hans. In 1960 the German Federal Intelligence Service (BND) requested the US Central Intelligence Agency's file on Schwägermann. Labora was later sold as a front company to the BND. According to Erich Kuby, in 1965 Schwägermann was a federal civil servant in Munich.
