= Wolfgang Diewerge =

National Socialist propagandist (1906–1977)

Wolfgang Diewerge (12 January 1906 in Stettin - 4 December 1977 in Essen) was a Nazi propagandist in Joseph Goebbels' Reich Ministry of Popular Enlightenment and Propaganda. His special field was anti-Semitic public relations, especially in connection with trials abroad, which could be exploited for propaganda purposes. He also played an essential role in the preparation of a show trial against Herschel Grynszpan, whose assassination attempt on a German embassy employee in Paris had been used by the Nazis as a trigger for the November pogroms in 1938. In 1941, his pamphlets on the so-called Kaufman Plan and the Soviet Union were published in print runs of millions. After the war, Diewerge managed to re-enter politics via the FDP North Rhine-Westphalia. However, the intervention of the British occupation authorities and a commission of the FDP's Federal Executive Committee put an abrupt end to this intermezzo. In 1966 Diewerge was convicted of perjury for his statements made under oath about the Grynszpan trial planned by the National Socialists. After all, he was involved in the Flick donations affair as managing director of two associations.

== Origin and early years ==
Diewerge's father was Wilhelm Diewerge, a Stettin secondary school teacher and later school principal in Stargard in Pomerania. His mother's name was Hedwig, née Grell. Wolfgang Diewerge had a three years younger brother, Heinz Diewerge, who during the Nazi regime made a career as a folklorist, teacher trainer and member of the party's official examination commission for the protection of Nazi literature. Heinz Diewerge died in 1939 from a war injury he sustained during the Polish campaign.

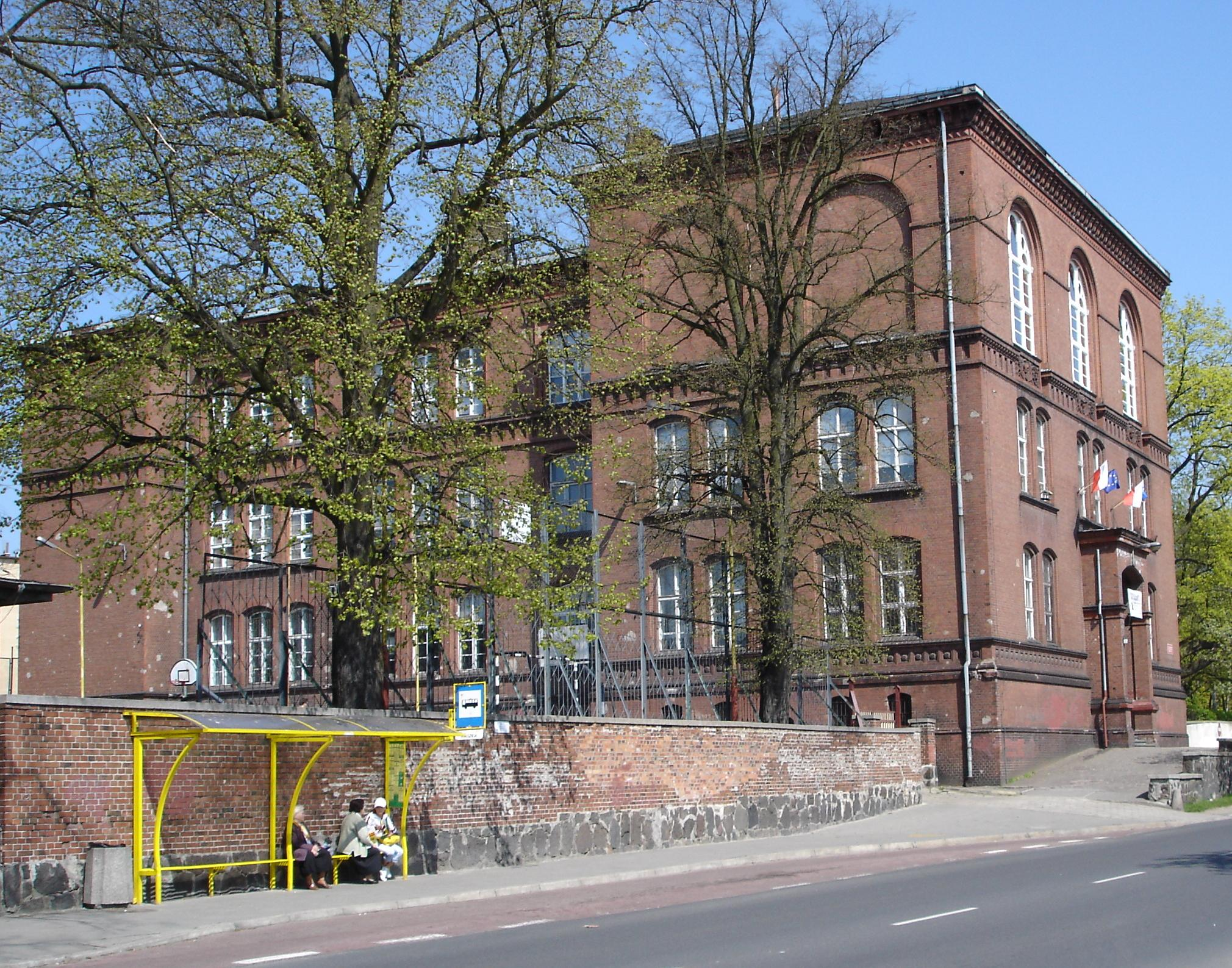
Stargard ILO2

Wolfgang Diewerge attended the traditional Gröning grammar school in Stargard and passed his school-leaving examination there in 1924 Afterwards he studied law in Jena and Berlin. He passed the first state examination in law in 1929, followed by a legal clerkship at the Kammergericht in Berlin, with a stay abroad of several months as a court clerk at the German consular court in Cairo and with the German lawyer Felix Dahm, who was admitted to the Mixed Court there. In spring 1933 Diewerge applied for an abbreviation of the state examination in law, and in November of the same year he finally passed his assessor examination.

Politically orientated, Diewergs early on aligned themselves with nationalist (Völkisch movement) and Nazi groups. According to his own statements, he became a member of the Schlageter-Gedächtnisbund (Schlageter Memorial Association) in October 1923, i.e. while still a schoolboy, and joined the Black Reichswehr in August 1924 in Leipzig. Since 1927, he occasionally wrote for Nazi newspapers and magazines, such as the Angriff, the Völkischer Beobachter, the Westdeutsche Beobachter, the National Socialist Monatshefte and the anti-Semitic satirical magazine Die Brennessel. August 1930 he joined the NSDAP (membership number 278.234). He is said to have been a member of the NSDAP earlier under the alias Diege. Even before 1933 Diewerge held various party offices in Berlin, from district propaganda officer to training officer to deputy local group leader. In addition, he made his legal knowledge available to various Nazi organizations, such as the Gaurechtsstelle Berlin of the NSDAP and the prisoner care of the SA, and appeared as a Gauredner.

== Nazi propagandist ==
In 1933 Diewerge became the Reich's managing director of the German Gymnastics Association and celebrated the Stuttgart Gymnastics Festival, which took place at the end of July, as a "folk festival in the National Socialist sense" in which "true national and destiny community" manifested itself In this year he also became head of the legal department of the "National Socialist Fighting League for Small and Medium-Sized Businesses – Gau Groß-Berlin". Diewerge was also a department head in the NSDAP foreign organization. In early 1934 he made his first public appearance. The occasion was a highly politicized trial in Cairo; the Egyptian capital was already familiar to him from his traineeship.

=== Profiling in antisemitic public relations: The Cairo Process ===
Wilhelm van Meeteren, the head of the Siemens Cairo branch and president of the German Association in Cairo, had published an antisemitic brochure there in mid-1933 entitled "The Jewish Question in Germany". Thereupon, the Jewish businessman Umberto Jabès, with the support of the Ligue Internationale Contre l'Antisémitisme (LICA, i.e. the International League against Anti-Semitism), had sued van Meeteren for damages for insult. The trial was to take place before a so-called Mixed Court, an Egyptian body for the settlement of legal disputes involving foreigners. On August 30, 1933, a discussion of the upcoming trial took place at the Foreign Office in Berlin's Wilhelmstraße, to which representatives of the Ministry of Propaganda were also invited. The young lawyer Diewerge was commissioned by this ministry to "prepare the ground" for the legal dispute.

Disturbed by the news that Jabès had won the internationally renowned Parisian lawyer Henry Torrès as his legal representative, the German Foreign Ministry initially pursued a cautious strategy and tried to keep the subject out of public debate in particular. Diewerge, on the other hand, sent a ten-page report to the Foreign Office on 29 September 1933 entitled "Press Support for the Cairo Trial", which, on the contrary, aimed to exploit the trial as publicly as possible. Diewerge drafted a detailed public relations strategy for this. He named media, target groups and costs and proposed a uniform label under which the trial would appear in the Nazi press: "Cairo Jewish Trial". According to him, the entire plan was coordinated in detail with the national group leader of the NSDAP in Egypt, Alfred Hess (Rudolf Hess' brother). The aim of the projected press work was clear from an enclosed sample text entitled "International Jewish Conspiracy against Germany in Egypt Revealed". Diewerge also immediately made public use of this sample text: for a lecture on October 5, 1933, on the radio and an article in the Völkischer Beobachter, which was largely identical to the text and appeared on October 6. Furthermore, he sent the text via the lawyer of confidence of the German legation in Cairo to selected Arabic and French-language newspapers in Cairo in order to generate the desired press response in Egypt as well. Among other things, he arranged for the newspaper La Liberté, which is close to the Egyptian King Fu'ad I, to publish an interview with Goebbels on the day of the trial.

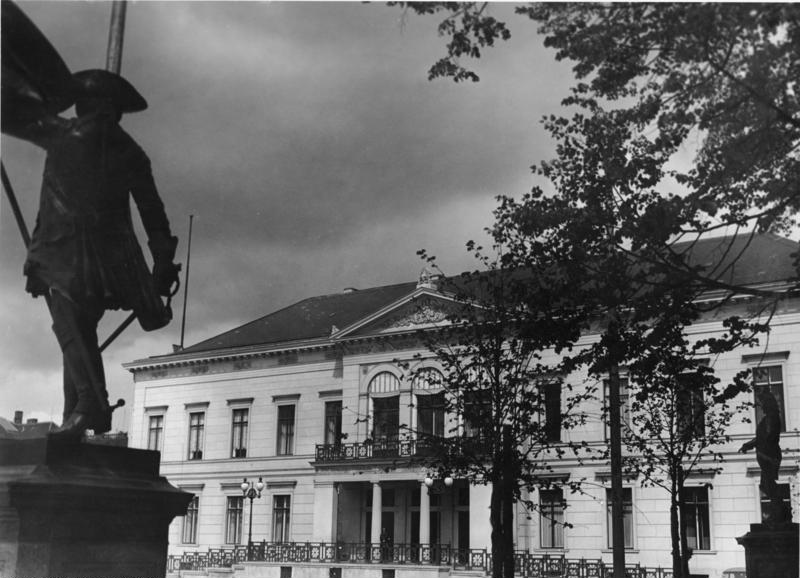
Bundesarchiv Bild 146-1993-020-32A, Berlin, Wilhelmplatz, Propagandaministerium

Diewerge succeeded in asserting himself with his ideas. At the beginning of 1934 he was appointed commissioner for the preparation and conduct of the trial. He travelled to Cairo as Special Rapporteur of the Völkischer Beobachter. He wrote newspaper reports, gave an interview to the Egyptian newspaper Al-Ahram and, after Jabès' complaint had been dismissed, on 31 January 1934 he gave a radio speech from Cairo on all German stations celebrating the "German victory over world Jewry". In 1935, after Jabès had also failed in the appeals court, Diewerge wrote a propagandistically designed report with the subtitle "Court-certified material on the Jewish question" in the party publishing house of the NSDAP.

In this court case, a division of labour had been established for the first time, which was continued in further proceedings: The internationally renowned international law expert Friedrich Grimm took over the legal side of the proceedings and appeared in the main hearing, while Diewerge took care of the journalistic and political planning in the sense of the Ministry of Propaganda.

In March 1934 Diewerge was employed as a government assessor in Goebbels' Reich Ministry of Popular Enlightenment and Propaganda. In mid-1935, he was listed in various constellations for Cuno Horkenbach's yearbooks as "Referent" in Department VII of this ministry, which is titled "Defense" or "Defense against lies. For Diewerge this marked the beginning of a continuous rise. In 1936 he became Regierungsrat, in 1939 Oberregierungsrat (Senior Councillor). In 1941 he reached the career level of a Ministerialrat (assistant head of a government department). In 1936 he married, by 1941 the couple already had three children. An undated assessment of the ministry about Diewerge was very positive, in particular his attitude to the Nazi world view was acknowledged as "unconditional". His duties included propaganda lectures abroad, among other things in connection with a three-month trip to Africa in 1937. Time and again his activities revolved around incidents, trials and publications abroad that gave rise to antisemitic campaigns against so-called world Jewry.

=== The Gustloff case: antisemitic politicization of a murder trial ===
In 1936, Diewerge's responsibilities in Department VII of the Propaganda Ministry, now called "Foreign Countries", extended to France, the French possessions in North Africa (Algeria, Tunisia), Morocco, Egypt, Monaco, and Switzerland. When David Frankfurter shot the NS regional group leader Wilhelm Gustloff in Davos on February 4, 1936, Diewerge was given a new opportunity to demonstrate his abilities in antisemitic propaganda. As early as February 18, he asked the Foreign Office for material on the assassination and the situation of the Nazi regional group in Switzerland in order to produce a brochure on the subject. In April, he had completed this brochure, again in cooperation with the foreign organization of the NSDAP. It was published under the title Der Fall Gustloff: Vorgeschichte und Hintergründe der Bluttat von Davos by the NSDAP's in-house publishing house, Franz-Eher-Verlag. As in the Cairo affair, tensions arose between the Ministry of Propaganda and the Foreign Office, which in this case was supported by the Reich Ministry of Economics. However, this did not concern the content of the brochure, but only the official date of publication. With reference to important economic negotiations with Switzerland and the remilitarisation of the Rhineland, the foreign and economic policy-makers demanded that the distribution of the booklet be waited until the summer. They were thus able to assert themselves.

The aim of the pamphlet was to blame Swiss politics and the critical reporting of the Swiss press on the one hand, and a Jewish-Bolshevik conspiracy, whose agent was allegedly Frankfurter, on the other. Since a large part of the brochure consisted of – tendentiously selected – press quotes, which Diewerge then commented in each case from a Nazi perspective, Nazi propaganda could hope that the distribution of the work in Switzerland would not be banned. In fact, there was never a state ban. Only the Swiss Federal Railways prohibited distribution via station kiosks, which resulted in an unsuccessful official protest by the German legation councillor Carl Werner Dankwort. Diewerge's Machwerk was particularly aggressive against 125 Swiss parliamentarians who had spoken out in favor of awarding the Nobel Peace Prize to Carl von Ossietzky, who was imprisoned in a Nazi concentration camp:

"And these shepherd boys take pleasure in attacking and insulting the government of Germany because of a notorious criminal"

When the trial of David Frankfurter took place in Chur in December 1936, Diewerge and Friedrich Grimm shared the work again. Diewerge directed and organized the press work, Grimm created a role for himself as a representative of Gustloff's widow in the accompanying civil suit, which enabled him to make at least a brief appearance in Chur. Together they searched for and found a Swiss lawyer (Werner Ursprung) for the criminal case against Frankfurter. Diewerge gave instructions to the German newspapers and wrote there himself, again as special reporter for the Völkischer Beobachter, launched press releases in Switzerland and led the German press delegation in Chur. Even before the trial, he came up with the idea of inviting selected Swiss journalists on an "information trip" to a German concentration camp and also offering them an interview with Roland Freisler (then State Secretary in the Reich Ministry of Justice). This plan worked: On 22 November 1936, four journalists set off for Börgermoor concentration camp at the expense of the Ministry of Propaganda, accompanied by members of the Ministry's press department. The Freisler interview also came off. And indeed, on November 29, the Basler Nachrichten published an article about the camp that was entirely in keeping with German intentions, praising among other things the "surprisingly low percentage of sick people" and "pretty red farmhouses".

In Chur, as in Cairo, the Diewerge/Grimm duo was on a "paradoxical mission": on the one hand, it was to prevent the trial from developing into a tribunal on German antisemitism; on the other hand, it was to use the trial as a starting point for antisemitic propaganda at home and abroad. Goebbels was, according to his diary, of the opinion that they had completed this undertaking "excellently" and "brilliantly".

In 1937 Diewerge published a second propaganda brochure about the trial under a title borrowed from Friedrich Sieburg: "A Jew fired ..." In doing so, he was able to rely on the complete trial files that were available to him through Grimm and Ursprung, and among other things quote for pages from the letters that Frankfurter had received in prison. Here Diewerge emphatically advocated the thesis of the Jewish world conspiracy, whereby he particularly attacked the German emigrant and Swiss citizen Emil Ludwig, who had published a book on the deed of Frankfurter: Ludwig's book, which Diewerge consistently referred to as "Ludwig-Cohn" to emphasize his Judaism, was "one of the most valuable and best pieces of evidence for the correctness of the Nazi racial legislation and the necessity of the eradication of Judaism from German cultural life." Frankfurters' defense counsel and the psychiatric expert also appeared in Diewerge's book as agents of Judaism with the Star of David, although they had no Jewish background whatsoever.

Diewerge's insulting attacks on Swiss citizens, journalists, lawyers and politicians were not forgotten in Switzerland; the Neue Zürcher Zeitung in particular repeatedly referred to the experiences of 1936 and 1937 in detailed reports on Diewerge's activities in the Federal Republic of Germany after the Second World War.

=== The case of Herschel Grynszpan: propaganda and trial planning ===
On November 7, 1938, the day of Herschel Grynszpan's assassination of Ernst Eduard vom Rath, the Legation Secretary of the German Embassy in Paris, the German News Bureau issued instructions that this incident should be highlighted in all German newspapers "in the greatest form". Special emphasis was placed on the political evaluation: "In their own comments it should be pointed out that the assassination must have the most serious consequences for the Jews in Germany". Wolfgang Diewerge was given as the contact for information, and was available to journalists from now on in his office in the Reich Ministry of Propaganda; background literature was also recommended to the reporters: Diewerge's antisemitic brochures on the assassination attempt on Gustloff.

On the very same day Diewerge must have written a model for such a commentary because the following day, November 8, the Völkischer Beobachter appeared with an editorial he had drawn. Under the headline "Criminals at the Peace of Europe" Diewerge wrote

"It is clear that the German people will draw their conclusions from this new crime. It is an impossible state of affairs that within our borders hundreds of thousands of Jews still dominate entire shopping streets, populate places of amusement and, as 'foreign' homeowners, pocket the money of German tenants, while their racial comrades outside call for war against Germany and shoot down German officials. The line from David Frankfurter to Herschel Grünspan is clearly drawn. [...] We will remember the names of those who confess to this cowardly murder [...] They are the same forces as in Cairo and Davos, they are Jews and not French. The shots fired at the German Embassy in Paris will not only mark the beginning of a new attitude on the Jewish question, but will hopefully also be a signal to those foreigners who have not yet realized that in the end only the international Jew stands between the understanding of peoples".

On November 8, Diewerge himself then appeared at the Reich press conference and gave more precise instructions on reporting, especially on its antisemitic tendencies (for example, Emil Ludwig was to be identified as one of the intellectual originators of the assassination; as already practiced in 1937, always with the epithet "Cohn") In retrospect, Diewerge's activities can be understood as a way of getting the population in the mood for the November pogroms, which took place during the so-called Reichskristallnacht from November 9 to 10, 1938.

When the trial of Grynszpan was being prepared in France, Friedrich Grimm was again to take part in it as a lawyer for the German Reich, while Diewerge was to provide journalistic support. And Diewerge's propaganda writings again came down to the already familiar tenor: the accused had performed the act as an instrument of world Jewry, Diewerge said in his writing on "Grünspan and his accomplices", which appeared in 1939.

However, a French trial did not materialize, since the French public prosecutor's charge was not brought until 8 June 1940, a few days before the Germans invaded Paris. When Grynszpan was caught in unoccupied France, Grimm successfully demanded the Vichy regime's extradition and Grynszpan was brought to Berlin. There Joseph Goebbels intended to hold a large show trial, to which, among others, the former French Foreign Minister Georges Bonnet was to be invited as a witness. Diewerge was commissioned to plan this trial: "Ministerial Councillor Diewerge of the Ministry of Propaganda has the special task of handling the trial of the murderer Grynszpan from a propaganda point of view." In fact Diewerge pushed the plans far ahead, there was already a detailed time and appearance plan for the court trial to be staged, in which Diewerge himself also had a role to play, namely as a speaker "on the preparation of world Jewry for the war against the Reich, in particular through the deed of Grünspan" But in May 1942 the project was stopped, apparently for two reasons: The Nazi leadership feared that Grynszpan would publicly present his act as an act in the hustler milieu, thus thwarting the propagandistic intention of the show trial; and the concept of suggesting credibility with the appearance of a French politician was rejected as politically inappropriate.

=== Jewish plutocracy, Jewish Bolshevism: antisemitic propaganda in millions ===
Diewerge continued to receive prestigious commissions in the Ministry of Propaganda, for example, he prepared the radio broadcast for Hitler's 50th birthday on 20 April 1939 In August 1939, one month before the invasion of Poland, he was appointed director of the Danzig radio station on the grounds that a "politician" was now needed at the head of the institution in this area of tension. Under his directorship, the station reported for the first time as "Reichssender Danzig", on the occasion of Hitler's speech on the attack on Poland on September 1. Diewerge's successor as director was Carl-Heinz Boese, while he himself took over as head of the Reich Propaganda Office Danzig in September 1939. There Diewerge organized the establishment of a network of Reich, Gau and district speakers for the NSDAP. With a brief interruption due to a deployment at the front as war correspondent in the summer of 1940, Diewerge remained in Danzig until February 1941. Then Goebbels brought him back to Berlin and appointed him head of the radio department in the Ministry of Propaganda. With this Diewerge had reached the peak of his career: He was now responsible for the entire political department of radio, especially for news and propaganda broadcasts. The historian and Goebbels biographer Peter Longerich judges that Diewerge, as "one of the most distinguished propagandists in the ministry", was entrusted by Goebbels not only with the management of the broadcasting department, but also with "overall responsibility for the political-propagandistic broadcasts of the Großdeutscher Rundfunk".

In addition to this activity, Diewerge worked on the construction of a Jewish world danger with two high-volume publications for the Nazi regime: He wrote a 32-page pamphlet Das Kriegsziel der Weltplutokratie, which, according to Goebbels' diary, was distributed in no less than five million copies. In it, he used quotes from a small edition of a brochure by the American Theodore Newman Kaufman, published by himself and otherwise hardly noticed, which, among other things, called for the sterilization of all Germans in the event of an American-German war. He dramatized this booklet on the demonic Kaufman plan, in which Judaism prescribed the destruction of Germanity for the Americans, and incorrectly gave the Jewish name Nathan as Kaufman's middle name. Diewerge's commentary contained this undisguised threat under the heading "Who shall die – the Germans or the Jews?

"How would it be if, instead of the 80 million Germans, these 20 million Jews were treated according to the recipe of their race comrade Kaufman? Then peace would be secured in any case. For the troublemaker, the disturber of the peace, all over the world is the Jew".

Goebbels expressed his satisfaction and said that the pamphlet would "finally do away with the last rudiments of a possible pliability, for even the most stupid can see from this pamphlet what threatens us if we should ever become weak". In the same year, Diewerge published an alleged collection of field mail letters from German soldiers under the title German Soldiers See the Soviet Union, which served to conjure up a Jewish-Bolshevik world danger on the basis of carefully selected and edited or even invented eyewitness accounts. In the texts contained therein, pogroms and genocide against the Jews were greeted with enthusiastic words:

"What happened in Lviv was repeated in the smallest villages. Everywhere [i.e. the 'Bolsheviks'] exterminated Ukrainians and Poles, but never a Jew. This is characteristic of the true perpetrators. But the people's rage was directed against this criminal people. They were beaten to death like dogs, as they deserved it."

And further

"It will be necessary to radically burn out the plague, because these animals will always be a danger ..."

This brochure, too, was distributed in millions of copies and was recommended to all journalists of the German Reich via instructions from the Reich Press Conference.

In his position as Head of the Broadcasting Department, Diewerge had permanent conflicts of competence with Heinrich Glasmeier, the Reichsintendant of the German Broadcasting Corporation. The mutual intrigues were repeatedly reflected in Goebbels' diary, who wished for greater assertiveness on the part of his head of department, but on the other hand did not want to comply with Diewerge's wish to drop Glasmeier. Ultimately, Diewerge was only able to hold on to this position until October 1942; at that time Hans Fritzsche replaced him as "Goebbels' man at the radio". This was apparently also related to the fact that in the course of the war, the entertainment component of the radio program grew significantly in comparison to the direct political propaganda. A member of the SS since September 1936, Diewerge then volunteered for frontal service in the Waffen-SS divisions Leibstandarte SS Adolf Hitler and Wiking. As a war correspondent, he wrote and spoke about 30 radio reports from the Caucasus under titles such as "Husarenstreich auf Volkswagen". After a stay in a military hospital in Krakow, Goebbels had him declared indispensable; his deployment on the front was thus over. In the following years, the Ministry of Propaganda employed Diewerge for a number of tasks, including lecture tours in and reports from occupied and neutral foreign countries. Among other things, he traveled to Turkey with propaganda speeches and then reported to Goebbels on the mood there. In the last year of the war he was again commissioned to go to Danzig.

In the course of his propaganda activities Diewerge received a number of other functions and awards: Since 1935 he was a Reich orator, later also a foreign orator for the NSDAP. On September 19, 1939, he received the NSDAP's Golden Party Badge on an honorary basis, wore the SS's honorary dagger and ring of honour and had held the rank of SS-Standartenführer since 1943. He is often referred to in literature as the bearer of the Blood Order of the NSDAP, but this cannot be regarded as certain. Diewerge is said to have belonged to the inner circle of those who were present at Goebbels' farewell ceremony in Berlin's 'Führer Bunker' on April 30, 1945. On May 1, according to his own statement, he "managed to make his way west".

== In the Federal Republic of Germany ==
After the war Diewerge would have fallen under the automatic arrest of the Allies because of his state and SS functions. He went into hiding and is said to have initially worked as an office manager for a lawyer in Hesse, until a new career opportunity with the FDP North Rhine-Westphalia arose through the mediation of his old colleague Friedrich Grimm.

=== The National Rally of the North Rhine-Westphalian FDP and the Naumann Circle ===
In 1951 Grimm introduced Diewerge to Ernst Achenbach, who during the Nazi era was head of the political department of the embassy in Paris and was now the foreign policy spokesman for the FDP. On Achenbach's recommendation, Diewerge obtained the position of personal secretary to Friedrich Middelhauve, the regional chairman of the North Rhine-Westphalian FDP. This personnel decision was not an isolated case, but a component of Middelhauve's attempt to establish a "National Rally" to the right of the CDU and SPD, which was to include Nazi officials in particular According to Middelhauve's later statements, it was made in full knowledge of Diewerge's activities during the Nazi era; the decisive factor was his "professional qualification". Historian Kristian Buchna comments: "Not of all people, but especially the experienced former Goebbels employee seemed predestined to train 'systematically new and additional speakers' in courses lasting several days, who were to be used in future as multipliers for the national collection course".

In his new position, Diewerge published, among other things, central training materials for election speakers ("Rednerschnellbrief"); from September to December 1952, at Middelhauve's suggestion, he was even entrusted with speaker training for the federal FDP He also designed speech manuscripts for Middelhauve. Diewerge also wrote articles for the North Rhine-Westphalian FDP magazine Die Deutsche Zukunft and was instrumental in editorial work on a "German Program" that was to make the planned "national rally" binding for the federal FDP; according to Lutz Hachmeister, he was even the main author of this program.[60] Speaker seminars organized by Diewerge served, for example, to train officials of the FDP youth organization, the Young Democrats, in the contents of the German Program. To such seminars he invited Paul Hausser, among others; Middelhauve also offered him to use Diewerge's expertise for the "press-related preparation" of an event organized by Hausser's mutual aid association for members of the former Waffen-SS.

At the same time Diewerge - at least partly with Middelhauve's knowledge - acted as a liaison of the Naumann Circle. This group of former Nazi functionaries led by Diewerge's former superior, the former state secretary in the Propaganda Ministry Werner Naumann, attempted to transform the FDP in the Nazi sense: "Whether a liberal party can ultimately be transformed into a Nazi combat group [...] I would like to doubt, but we must give it a try," said a speech manuscript by Naumann from 18 January 2008. Diewerge kept Naumann permanently informed by telephone conversations - tapped by the British secret service - and made numerous FDP materials available to him (including the "Rednerschnellbrief"). When the FDP provided him with a car for the speaker training, Diewerge told Naumann by telephone that he could now visit all the "Gauhauptstädte" (regional capitals) to refresh his contacts from the Nazi era. Diewerge also presented Naumann and Hans Fritzsche with the draft of the "German Programme" for review.

On 14–15 January 1953, several members of the Naumann Circle, also known as the Gauleiter Circle, were arrested by the authority of the British High Commissioner in accordance with his Allied reservation rights. Thereupon, a commission of the Federal Executive Committee of the FDP under the leadership of Thomas Dehler began to investigate the personnel policy of the North Rhine-Westphalian FDP and the connections between the FDP and the Naumann Circle. In particular Diewerge′s position was now increasingly discussed both within the party and in public, in the FDP Diewerge was chosen as a victim and demands for his dismissal became more frequent. The latter then offered Middelhauve to give up his position of his own accord, but Middelhauve at first tenaciously held on to his employee. Only when it turned out that Diewerge was in fact politically untenable in the FDP, Middelhauve finally accepted his application for dismissal on April 1, 1953. Diewerge himself spoke of "mutual agreement" in a reader's letter to Der Spiegel. The preliminary report of the FDP federal executive committee also called for Diewerge's party expulsion. Only when this was discussed in the executive committee on June 7, 1953, did it turn out that Diewerge was "certainly not" a member of the FDP, which a number of members of the executive committee noted with great astonishment. Thomas Dehler stated that this information had "taken his breath away" and connected this with bitter reproaches to the address of Middelhauve: "Do you really want to say, Dr. Middelhauve, that you do not bear any responsibility for the fact that such a man who was not a member of the party was presented to us by you as a trainer for the whole party? This is outrageous!"

Diewerge felt unjustly treated by the FDP and the public, as he wrote in several letters to Thomas Dehler. He demanded understanding for the fact "that 20 years ago a young assessor full of zest for action and ambition threw himself on his first big assignment" and complained that due to the scandalization in the public his behavior in the FDP now appeared "negative", although it would have been "considered as harmless, if not appropriate in case of normal development". Still in 1956 he demanded a rehabilitation from Dehler, because he had had professional disadvantages due to the affair. He had been forced to "familiarize himself with a completely foreign industry without any possibility to use my education and my previous knowledge". Apparently the advertising industry was meant, because in the following years Diewerge worked as advertising manager in Essen.

=== Caught up in the past: The Essen perjury trial ===
In 1966 his Nazi past caught up with him once again: The Regional Court in Essen instituted a perjury trial against Diewerge. The reason for this was Diewerge's testimony in 1959 in a trial against the author Michael Graf Soltikow, who had claimed in various publications that the assassination attempt by Herschel Grynszpan was demonstrably due to homosexual relations between Grynszpan and vom Rath - a brother of vom Rath had sued Soltikow for this. The charges against Diewerge were essentially based on two points: Firstly, Diewerge had declared under oath in the Soltikow trial that he had only heard about an alleged homosexual motive for the crime at a late stage and that he was not aware that such a statement had contributed to the termination of the Grynszpan trial. Secondly, he had "categorically" denied that he had known anything about propagandistic "secondary intentions" in 1941 and 1942, especially that the trial was intended to justify "anti-Jewish measures". Kristian Buchna summarizes in retrospect Diewerge had presented himself in the 1959 interrogation as an "ignorant, by no means anti-Semitic recipient of orders".

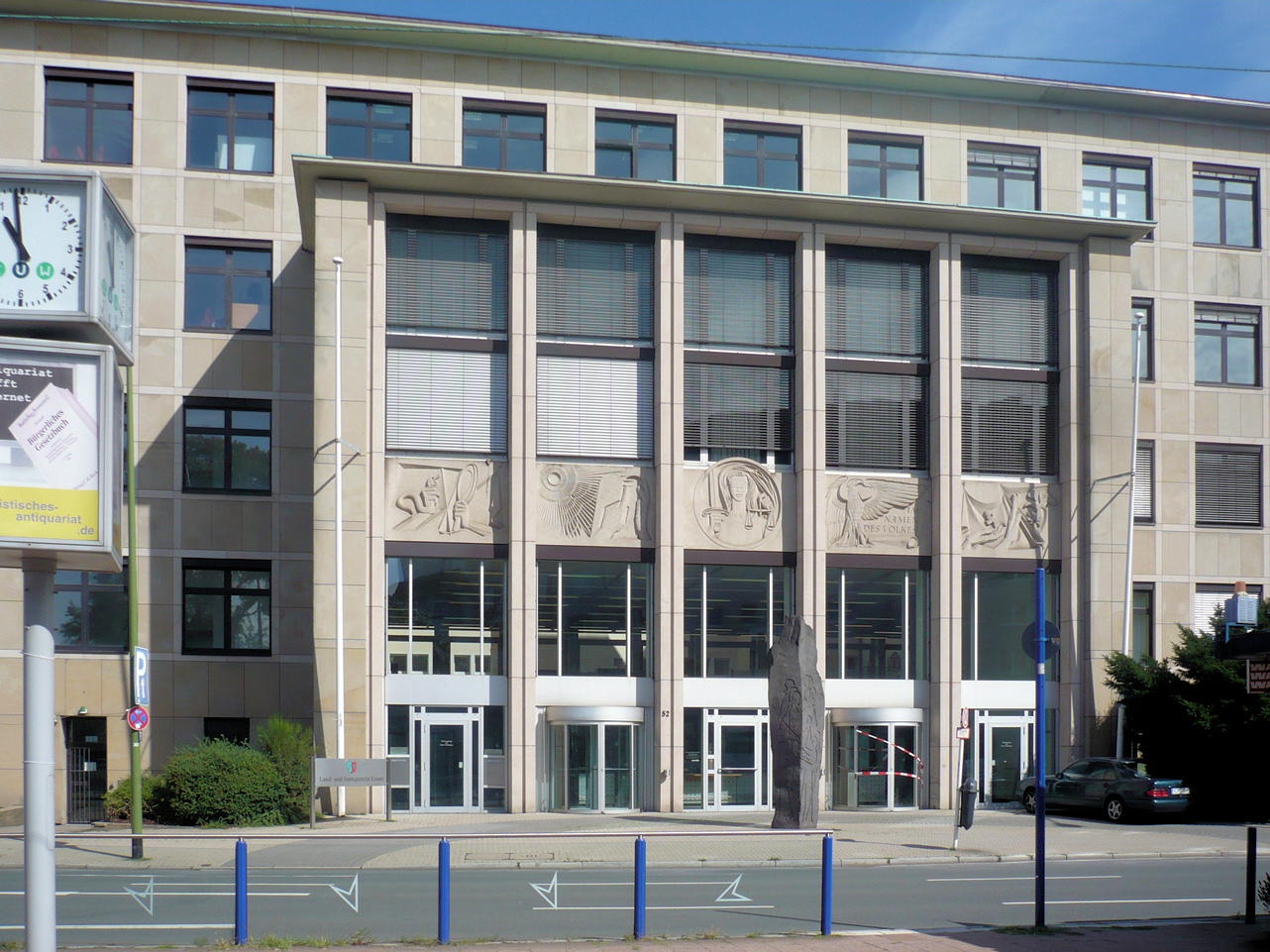
Landgericht Essen

In the Essen trial Diewerge stuck to his claims and stated that he had first heard about the Final Solution from an English newspaper in Stockholm in 1944. After a series of testimonies from high-ranking Nazi officials, including Ernst Lautz, Leopold Gutterer, Heinrich Hunke, Walter Jagusch, Ewald Krümmer and Franz Schlegelberger, the court came to the conclusion that Diewerge's testimony was not false with regard to the alleged homosexual motive for the crime. On the other hand, Diewerge had deliberately told the untruth with his assurance that he had no idea the show trial against Grynszpan was intended to justify measures against Jews. In a judgment of 17 February 1966, Diewerge was sentenced to one year in prison for perjury, which was later suspended on probation.

In the same year, the Wiesbaden public prosecutor's office received another criminal complaint against Diewerge. It also referred to the show trial against Grynszpan prepared by Diewerge. Although the investigations were quickly discontinued, Hesse's Attorney General Fritz Bauer ordered his office to take over the proceedings. However, processing was slow; it was not until 1969 that the General Prosecutor's Office finally took over the investigations. It sought a conviction for accessory to murder: Diewerge had encouraged the mass murder of the Jews by planning and propagandistically using the show trial. Since the Grynszpan trial did not take place and therefore remained an unsuccessful attempt at aiding and abetting, the authorities discontinued the proceedings on 20 November 1969.

=== Involvement in the Flick affair ===
Diewerge's connections to the FDP were not broken off during this time. This became apparent when he took over the management of two newly founded associations in 1968: the Gesellschaft für Europäische Wirtschaftspolitik e.V. (GfEW), according to its statutes a tax-exempt professional association, and the International Business Club e.V. (IWC), which was recognised as a non-profit organisation and therefore also tax-exempt. Otto Graf Lambsdorff was vice-chairman of the GfEW, another high-ranking FDP politician, Wolfram Dorn, was vice-chairman of the IWC. As the Regional Court of Bonn stated in 1987, years after Diewerge's death, in the judgement against Eberhard von Brauchitsch, Hans Friderichs and Lambsdorff in the so-called Flick affair, these associations only pursued their statutory goals in appearance: In reality they served to receive tax-exempt industrial donations and to channel them indirectly to the FDP, i.e. they aided and abetted tax evasion.

Diewerge retained the management of both associations for five years and, according to the findings of the Regional Court, was actively involved in disguising their true purposes. For example, on 27 January 1971 he wrote to the Neuwied tax office, which was planning an audit, "contrary to the truth", that the GfEW had started its activities as a professional association as planned, and drew up a list of corresponding activities. In 1973, at the age of 67, he resigned as managing director of both associations and was replaced by Joachim Friedrich von Stojentin, later by Friedrich Karl Patterson. He died in 1977, four years before the public prosecutor's investigations into the Flick affair began. Still in the week before his death, on 26/27 November 1977, he had been scheduled as an external speaker for an event of the HIAG to train the members of this traditional organization of the Waffen-SS in "public relations", but had had to cancel at short notice.

== Afterlife ==
Some of Diewerge's propaganda writings were digitalised in the Internet age and can be found on various radical right-wing or revisionist websites. In particular, the contents of the brochures on the "Gustloff case" and the "Kaufman plan" are still frequently used as propaganda material in the neo-Nazi scene.

This situation is the starting point for Günter Grass's novella Im Krebsgang (Crabwalk), published in 2002. On the right-wing website "www.blutzeuge.de", the first-person narrator finds himself in a chat room dealing with Wilhelm Gustloff and the fate of the ship of the same name. There he meets a chatter who repeatedly cites the "party comrade and Reich orator Wolfgang Diewerge" as a source. Other chatters briefly touch upon Diewerge's connection with the Naumann circle and the Flick affair.

== Research and literature situation ==
There is no comprehensive biography of Diewerge. In addition to the short, not detailed outlines in Ernst Klee's Personenlexikon zum Dritten Reich and Wolfgang Benz' Handbuch des Antisemitismus, a relatively extensive account of Diewerge's biography can be found in Kristian Buchna's 2010 study.

In contrast, there are already detailed research reports on the political activities in which Diewerge was involved, some of which at least marginally address Diewerge's actions. The Cairo Trial is dealt with from different perspectives in the studies by Gudrun Krämer, Albrecht Fueß and Mahmoud Kassim, whereby the latter two in particular offer material on Diewerge's propaganda activities and also deal with his cooperation with the Nazi foreign organization and the differences to the line of the German Foreign Office. The Gustloff affair is dealt with in Peter O. Chotjewitz's extensive essay Murder as Catharsis and a study by Mathieu Gillabert. Here, too, the relationship between the Ministry of Propaganda, the foreign organization of the NSDAP and the Foreign Office plays a significant role. In 2012, Armin Fuhrer has presented a book which, based on archive research, especially in Swiss newspaper archives, provides new information about Diewerge's activities in the Gustloff case. Helmut Heiber's study of 1957 is still essential for Diewerge's role in the planned Grynszpan trial, while Alan E. Steinweis's book on Kristallnacht 1938 provides additional information. In 1981 Wolfgang Benz analysed Diewerge's booklet on the Kaufman Plan in the Quarterly Magazines for Contemporary History. In his book of 2010 Kristian Buchna has evaluated numerous archive sources on the "National Rally" of the FDP North Rhine-Westphalia and can therefore present Diewerges' activities in this context in great detail. The book by journalist Hans Leyendecker remains an important source for Diewerge's role in the Flick affair.

Contemporary reports such as Cuno Horkenbach's handbook The German Reich from 1918 to the present day from 1935 or the press reports, especially those of the Neue Zürcher Zeitung on the Essen perjury trial, provide material for the phases of life that are not or hardly touched by these scientific publications. The Institute for Contemporary History has a collection of files on Diewerge. A collection containing notes of a conversation between Helmut Heiber and Diewerge and his testimony in the Soltikow trial is accessible online. A further collection containing the estate of the Essen public prosecutor Hans-Ulrich Behm, the prosecuting attorney in the Essen trial, has not yet been evaluated.

== Books (selection) ==
- Als Sonderberichterstatter zum Kairoer Judenprozeß. Gerichtlich erhärtetes Material zur Judenfrage. München: Eher, 1935.
- Der Fall Gustloff. Vorgeschichte und Hintergründe der Bluttat von Davos. München: Eher, 1936.
- Ein Jude hat geschossen. Augenzeugenbericht vom Prozeß gegen David Frankfurter. München, Eher, 1937.
- Anschlag gegen den Frieden. Ein Gelbbuch über Grünspan und seine Helfershelfer. München, Eher, 1939.
- Der neue Reichsgau Danzig-Westpreußen. Ein Arbeitsbericht vom Aufbauwerk im deutschen Osten. Junker und Dünnhaupt, 1940.
- Das Kriegsziel der Weltplutokratie. Dokumentarische Veröffentlichung zu dem Buch des Präsidenten der amerikanischen Friedensgesellschaft Theodore Nathan Kaufman „Deutschland muß sterben“ („Germany must perish“). München: Eher, 1941.
- Deutsche Soldaten sehen die Sowjetunion. Feldpostbriefe aus dem Osten. Berlin: Limpert, 1941.
- Hubert Kogge. Weg eines Unternehmers. Mit Zeichnungen von Josef Arens. Herrn Hubert Kogge zu seinem 25. Geschäftsjubiläum von seinen Mitarbeitern überreicht. Köln: Wirtschaftsverlag Dr. Sinz, 1959.

== Literature ==
- Wolfgang Benz: Judenvernichtung aus Notwehr? Die Legenden um Theodore N. Kaufman. In: Vierteljahrshefte für Zeitgeschichte. Jg. 29, Vol 4, 1981, p. 615–630, online (PDF; 8,8 MB).
- Wolfgang Benz: Wolfgang Diewerge. In: Wolfgang Benz (Hrsg.): Handbuch des Antisemitismus. Judenfeindschaft in Geschichte und Gegenwart. Vol 2: Personen. Part 1: A–K. de Gruyter Saur, Berlin 2009, ISBN 978-3-598-24072-0 p. 174–176.
- Kristian Buchna: Nationale Sammlung an Rhein und Ruhr. Friedrich Middelhauve und die nordrhein-westfälische FDP. 1945–1953. Oldenbourg, Munich 2010,ISBN 978-3-486-59802-5 (Schriftenreihe der Vierteljahrshefte für Zeitgeschichte).
- Peter O. Chotjewitz: Mord als Katharsis. In: Emil Ludwig, Peter O. Chotjewitz: Der Mord in Davos. Texte zum Attentatsfall David Frankfurter – Wilhelm Gustloff. March, Herbstein 1986, ISBN 3-88880-065-X, S. 119–209.
- Albrecht Fueß: Die deutsche Gemeinde in Ägypten von 1919–1939. Lit, Hamburg 1996, ISBN 3-8258-2734-8 (Hamburger islamwissenschaftliche und turkologische Arbeiten und Texte 8).
- Armin Fuhrer: Tod in Davos. David Frankfurter und das Attentat auf Wilhelm Gustloff. Metropol, Berlin 2012, ISBN 978-3-86331-069-1.
- Matthieu Gillabert: La propagande nazie en Suisse. L'affaire Gustloff 1936. Presses polytechniques et universitaires romandes, Lausanne 2008, ISBN 978-2-88074-772-5 (Le Savoir Suisse 49).
- Helmut Heiber: Der Fall Grünspan. In: Vierteljahrshefte für Zeitgeschichte. Vol 5, Issue 2, 1957, p. 134–172, online (PDF; 4,36; 4,6 MB).
- Cuno Horkenbach (Ed.): Das Deutsche Reich von 1918 bis heute. Presse- und Wirtschaftsverlag GmbH, Berlin 1935, p. 931. Annual volume 1933.
- Mahmoud Kassim: Die diplomatischen Beziehungen Deutschlands zu Ägypten, 1919–1936. Lit, Berlin et al. 2000, ISBN 3-8258-5168-0 (Studien zur Zeitgeschichte des Nahen Ostens und Nordafrikas 6), (Zugleich: Hamburg, Univ., Diss., 1999).
- Ernst Klee: Das Personenlexikon zum Dritten Reich. Wer war was vor und nach 1945. Updated edition, 2nd Edition. Fischer, Frankfurt am Main 2007, ISBN 978-3-596-16048-8, p. 111 (Fischer 16048 Die Zeit des Nationalsozialismus).
- Hans Leyendecker: Der Edelmann und die Miami-Connection. Die international verflochtenen Spenden-Vereine der FDP. In: Hans Leyendecker (Ed.): Das Lambsdorff-Urteil. Steidl, Göttingen 1988, ISBN 3-88243-111-3, p. 113–131.
- Gerhard Mauz: Was man auch von Dr. Goebbels sagen mag... In: Der Spiegel. Nr. 4 (17 January), 1966, p. 30–32 (Report on the Essen perjury trial, Online).
- Alan E. Steinweis: Kristallnacht 1938. Ein deutscher Pogrom. Reclam, Stuttgart 2011, ISBN 978-3-15-010774-4.
