= Wenke =

Wenke is a surname or name. Notable people with the surname include:

- Ad Wenke (1898–1961) American footballer and state supreme court justice
- Klaus Wenke (1916–1944), German naval officer in WW2

== Other ==
Wenke is an alternative spelling of the Norwegian given name Wenche.
