= Semmler =

Semmler is a German surname. Notable people with the surname include:

- Christoph Semmler (born 1980), German footballer
- Clement Semmler, (1914–2000), Australian author, literary critic, broadcaster and radio and television executive
- Friedrich Wilhelm Semmler (1836–1931), German chemist
- Rudolf Semmler (1913-?), journalist
- Stefan Semmler (born 1952), German rower

== See also ==
- Semmler-Wolff reaction
- Semler
