= Friedrich Middelhauve =

German publisher and politician (1896–1966)

- Middelhauve in the 1950s

Deputy Minister-president Minister of Economics and Transport North Rhine-Westphalia
- In office 27 July 1954 – 20 February 1956
- Minister-president: Karl Arnold
- Preceded by: Artur Sträter
- Succeeded by: Willi Weyer (Deputy Minister-president); Hermann Kohlhase (Minister of Economics and Transport)

Deputy Federal Chairman, FDP
- In office November 1952 – April 1956

Chairman, FDP State Association North Rhine-Westphalia
- In office August 1947 – 22 February 1956
- Preceded by: Gustav Altenhain
- Succeeded by: Willi Weyer

Additional positions
- 1946–1958: Landtag member, North Rhine Westphalia
- 1949–1950 & 1953–1954: Bundestag member

Personal details
- Born: 17 November 1896 Siegen, Province of Westphalia, Kingdom of Prussia, German Empire
- Died: 14 July 1966 (aged 69) Bad Mergentheim, Baden-Württemberg, West Germany
- Party: Free Democratic Party
- Other political affiliations: German State Party
- Education: University of Bonn; University of Cologne; University of Marburg; University of Münster
- Awards: Order of Merit of the Federal Republic of Germany

Military service
- Allegiance: German Empire
- Branch/service: Imperial German Army
- Years of service: 1916–1918
- Battles/wars: World War I

Friedrich Middelhauve (17 November 1896 – 14 July 1966) was a German publisher and a politician of the Free Democratic Party (FDP). From 1947 until 1956, he served as FDP state chairman for North Rhine-Westphalia and, between 1952 and 1956, he was the party's deputy federal chairman. From July 1954 until February 1956, he was Deputy Minister-president and Minister of Economics and Transport in North Rhine-Westphalia. He also served as a member of the state and federal legislatures. On the right wing of the party, he tried unsuccessfully to steer the FDP into a united bloc with smaller conservative parties in an effort dubbed the "National Collective".

== Early life, family and publishing career ==
Middelhauve was born in Siegen, the son of a Prussian state railways senior engineer. After obtaining his Abitur from the Realgymnasium in Solingen, he was conscripted into the Imperial German Army in 1916 during the First World War, and served as an interpreter at a prisoner of war camp near Wesel until the end of the war. He resumed his education, studying literature, history and art history at Marburg, Bonn and Münster, and received his doctorate in 1921, at the University of Cologne. He then opened an independent bookstore in Leverkusen. The inflation crisis of the early 1920s led to its closure but, by 1924, he founded a publishing house in Opladen. In 1928, Mittelheuve married Bertha Reichert and had three children: Friedrich Middelhauve Jr., Gertraud Middelhauve (who also became a publisher) and Mechthild Ruf. In 1938, he acquired a paper processing plant in Cologne. With the establishment of the Westdeutschen Verlag at Cologne and Opladen in 1946, Middelhauve also founded one of Germany's leading publishing houses for works of the social sciences. The following year, he founded the publishing house Friedrich Middelhauve Verlag in Opladen, which first published the short stories and novels of Heinrich Böll. In 1960, he also acquired Leske Verlag, when it merged with Westdeutschen Verlag.

== Political career ==
During the Weimar Republic, Friedrich Middelhauve was a member of the German State Party and served as deputy chairman of the Düsseldorf-South constituency and chairman of the Rhein-Wupper district association. After the Nazi seizure of power, all parties except the Nazi Party were banned. Middelhauve never joined the Party and was not politically active. He was exempted from military service in the Second World War because his printing business was classified as important for the war effort.

After the end of the war, Middelhauve founded the small German Reconstruction Party in Opladen in October 1945, becoming its chairman. However, by January 1946, he became affiliated with the newly-established Free Democratic Party (FDP) in the British occupation zone and became an associate of Franz Blücher, Hermann Hopker-Aschoff and Erich Mende, notable leadership figures in the Rhineland. Between 1946 and 1947, Middelhauve served as a city councilor in Leverkusen. In August 1947, he succeeded Gustav Altenhain as party chairman for the state of North Rhine-Westphalia, remaining in this position until 1956. From 1946 to 1958, Middelhauve was a member of the Landtag of North Rhine-Westphalia. From 1950 to 1956, he was also a member of the FDP Federal Executive Board and from 1952 to 1956, he was a deputy federal chairman.

Middelhauve, on the right wing of the party, endorsed the inclusion of former Wehrmacht personnel and even former Nazi Party members into the FDP as a means to expand the party rolls. He was also a strong supporter of amnesty for former Nazis. While state party chairman, together with fellow Landtag member Ernst Achenbach, he formulated the nationalist "German Program", which advocated for a united Germany and against the "victors' justice" of the Allies. They envisioned creating an authoritarian "National Collective" of all conservative and nationalist parties. Middelhauve submitted the program for adoption at the FDP federal party conference in November 1952, at Bad Ems, but the united opposition of the more liberal regional associations of Hamburg, Bremen and Baden-Württemberg prevented its adoption. Middelhauve, through his personal secretary Wolfgang Diewerge, also had contacts with the Naumann Circle, a clandestine group of Neo-Nazi conspirators that was planning to infiltrate the FDP as a means to return to power. The plot was exposed and disrupted by the British security forces in January 1953. An FDP internal investigation resulted in the dismissal of Diewerge and two other minor officials but Middelhauve was able to retain his state and federal party posts.

As the chairman of the FDP state parliamentary faction from 1946 to 1954, Middelhauve was the leader of the opposition to the CDU–SPD–Center Party coalition cabinet of Minister-president Karl Arnold. When the FDP joined the CDU and Center in Arnold's next coalition cabinet in July 1954, Middelhauve became Deputy Minister-president and Minister of Economy and Transport. On 20 February 1956, a vote of no confidence in Arnold's cabinet was supported by the so-called "Young Turks" on the left wing of the FDP, including Wolfgang Döring, Walter Scheel, Hans Wolfgang Rubin and Willi Weyer. Arnold's government resigned and was replaced by an SPD–FDP coalition. Middelhauve, who had backed Arnold, was not included in the new cabinet, and within days he also resigned as FDP state chairman, two years before his term was to expire. He remained in the Landtag until 1958, though his political career was effectively ended. From August 1949 until 17 October 1950 and from September 1953 until 10 September 1954, Middelhauve also sat as a deputy in the national Bundestag.

== Honors and death ==
On his 65th birthday in 1961, Middelhauve was awarded the Grand Cross of Merit with star and shoulder ribbon. He also was the recipient of an honorary membership in the RWTH Aachen University in 1965, and an honorary doctorate from the Faculty of Economics and Social Sciences at the University of Cologne followed shortly afterward.

Middelhauve died in Bad Mergentheim on 14 July 1966, and was buried at Friedhof Birkenberg (Birch Mountain Cemetery) in Leverkusen.

== Sources ==
- Buchna, Kristian: Friedrich Middelhauve, Verleger und Politiker (1896-1966) in Portal Rheinische Geschichte.
- Frei, Norbert (2002). Adenauer's Germany and the Nazi Past. Columbia University Press. ISBN 978-0-231-11882-8.
- Hax, Karl: (1966) Friedrich Middelhauve zum Gedächtnis in ZfbF, Springer Verlag, pp. 613–615.
- Klee, Ernst (2007). Das Personenlexikon zum Dritten Reich. Wer war was vor und nach 1945. Frankfurt-am-Main: Fischer-Taschenbuch-Verlag. ISBN 978-3-596-16048-8.
- Menges, Franz: (1994) Middelhauve, Friedrich in Deutsche Biographie, pp. 461–462.
- Middelhauve, Friedrich in Leverkusen.com.
- Nazis und Nationale Sammlung: Pflicht nach rechts in: Antifa Infoblatt 59, (2003).
