= Karl Arnold =

German politician (1901–1958)

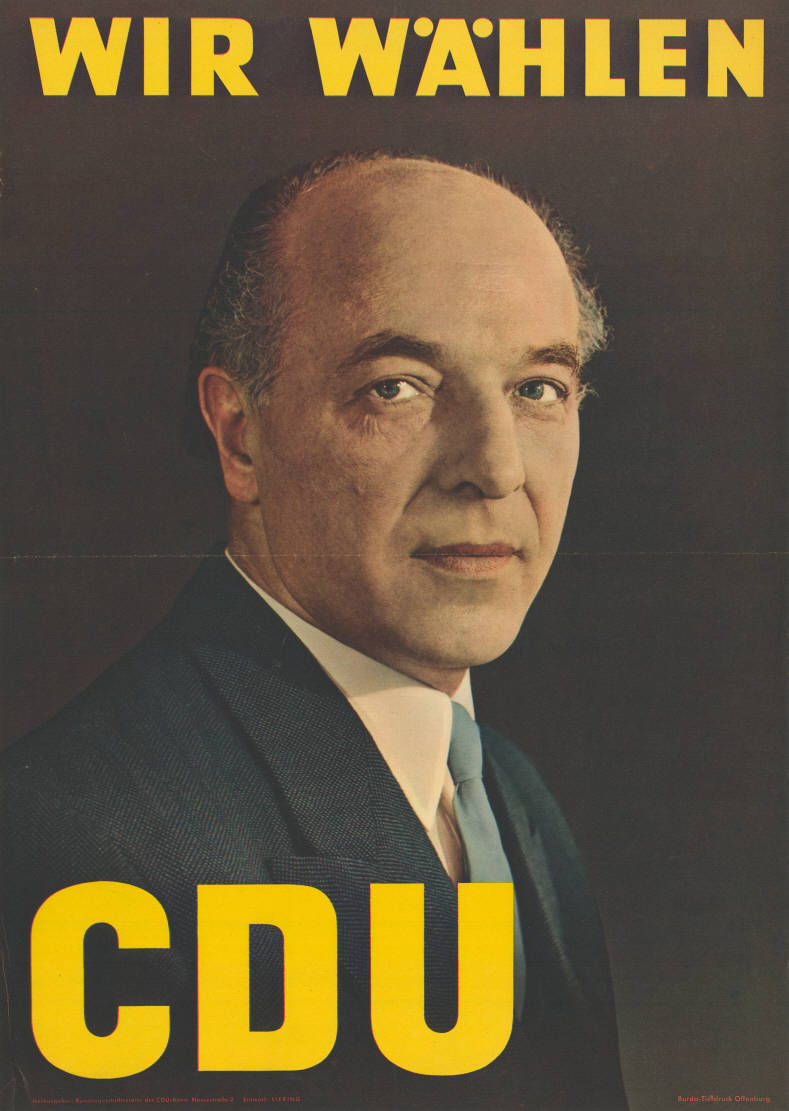

Minister President of North Rhine-Westphalia
- In office 17 June 1947 – 20 February 1956
- Deputy: Walter Menzel; Artur Sträter; Friedrich Middelhauve
- Preceded by: Rudolf Amelunxen
- Succeeded by: Fritz Steinhoff

President of the German Bundesrat
- In office 7 September 1949 – 8 September 1950
- Preceded by: Position established
- Succeeded by: Hans Ehard

Member of the Bundestag
- In office 15 October 1957 – 29 June 1958

Personal details
- Born: 21 March 1901 Herrlishöfen, Kingdom of Württemberg, Germany
- Died: 29 June 1958 (aged 57) Düsseldorf, North Rhine-Westphalia, West Germany
- Party: CDU, previously Centre Party
- Spouse: Liesel Joeres

Karl Arnold (21 March 1901 – 29 June 1958) was a German politician. He was Minister President of North Rhine-Westphalia from 1947 to 1956.

== Early life and education ==
Arnold was born in Herrlishöfen in Württemberg on 21 March 1901. He was trained as a shoemaker and later (1920/21) studied at the Soziale Hochschule Leohaus, Munich.

From 1920 onwards, Arnold worked as functionary of the movement of Christian workers. In 1924, he became secretary of the Christian workers union for the Düsseldorf region. He was elected in the town council of Düsseldorf for the Centre Party in 1929.

In 1933, Arnold was co-owner of a sanitary installation shop in Düsseldorf. The Gestapo observed and hunted him in the following years because of his political activities. In 1944, he was jailed by the Gestapo.

== Career ==
After World War II, Arnold became politically active again. In 1945, he was co-founder of the local Christian-Democratic Party in Düsseldorf, which became part of the CDU later in 1945. Also in 1945, the Düsseldorf chapter of the united workers union was founded, presided by Arnold. On 29 January 1946 Arnold was named mayor of Düsseldorf and later elected in the first free elections (26 October 1946).

In December 1946, Arnold became deputy minister-president of the state of North Rhine-Westphalia and in 1947 he was elected minister-president. Until 1950 he presided over a coalition of CDU, Centre Party, SPD and (briefly) the Communist Party. He considered himself a "christian socialist". The only in-parliament-party he did not let enter the government was the FDP, whose North Rhine-Westphalian branch had a particular nationalist bent.

On 7 September 1949, he was elected as the first president of the Bundesrat of Germany, the representation of German states at the federal level.

From 1950 to 1956, Arnold was elected minister-president for North Rhine-Westphalia twice again, governing with the help of conservative parties and the Free Democrats. Important acts of his government were the foundation of the North Rhine-Westphalian broadcasting system (today: Westdeutscher Rundfunk) and the German system of workers union influence in steel and coal industries.

On 20 February 1956, the FDP switched coalition affiliation to the SPD, ending the Arnold government in North Rhine-Westphalia.

In 1957, he was elected into the German Bundestag (with a 72% majority in his constituency). He was member of the Bundestag until 29 June 1958, when he died of a heart attack.

== Personal life ==
In 1928, Arnold married Liesel Joeres.

Arnold was a Catholic and a member of the German branch of the lay Catholic organization Catholic Action.

Political offices
Preceded by Rudolf Amelunxen	Minister President of North Rhine-Westphalia; 1947–1956	Succeeded by Fritz Steinhoff
