= Wenche =

Wenche is a female first name in Norway. The name is also spelled Venke, Wenke, Venche, Wencke, Vence or Vencke.

== Distribution ==
The table below gives an overview of the popularity of the name Wenche in some of the countries where statistics are available.

Country	Among the country's population			Among newborns		
Country	Number	Percentage	Ranking	Number	Percentage	Ranking
Norway	14,679 (2006)	0.63%	30	-	-	(> 465.)
Sweden	472 (2006)	0.01%	-	-	-	(> 99.)
Denmark	141 (2007)	0.01%	-	-	-	(> 50.)

Notable people with the name include:

- Wenche Elizabeth Arntzen (born 1959), Norwegian lawyer and judge
- Wenche Foss (1917–2011), Norwegian actress
- Wenche Klouman (1918–2009), Norwegian actress
- Venke Knutson (born 1978), Norwegian singer
- Wenche Myhre (born 1947), Norwegian singer
- Wenche Selmer (1920–1998), Norwegian architect
