= Selmer (surname) =

Selmer is a surname. Notable people with the surname include:

- Christian August Selmer (1816–1889), Norwegian lawyer, magistrate and politician
- Elisabeth Schweigaard Selmer (1923–2009), Norwegian judge and politician
- Ernst Sejersted Selmer (1920–2006), Norwegian mathematician
- Ernst W. Selmer (1890–1971), Norwegian philologist and phonetician
- Jens Selmer, Norwegian actor
- Knut Selmer (1924–2009), Norwegian legal scholar
- Odd Selmer (born 1930), Norwegian journalist, novelist and playwright
- Wenche Selmer (1920–1998), Norwegian architect

== See also ==
- Ågot Gjems Selmer or Gjems-Selmer (1858–1926), Norwegian actress, writer, and lecturer
