= Semler =

Semler is an occupational surname derived from the occupation of baker who bakes semmels, i.e., white bread rolls.

Notable people with the surname include:

- Andrée Sfeir-Semler (born 1953), art historian and gallery owner
- Augustin Semler (1907-?), Romanian footballer
- Borut Semler (born 1985), Slovene footballer
- Dean Semler (born 1943), Australian cinematographer
- Gustav Adolf Semler (1885–1968), German film actor of the silent era
- Jack Semler, American ice hockey coach and former player
- James "Soldier Boy" Semler, American sports executive, baseball team owner
- Johann Salomo Semler (1725–1791), German church historian and Biblical commentator
- Leonore Semler (1921–2016), German philanthropist
- Ricardo Semler (born 1959), CEO and majority owner of the Brazilian company of Semco SA
- Willy Semler (born 1959), Chilean actor

== See also ==
- Grace Semler Baldridge, who records music as Semler
- Jules Semler-Collery (1902–1988), French composer, conductor and teacher
- Selmer (disambiguation)
- Semmler
