= Werner Naumann =

German Nazi politician (1909–1982)

Reichsminister of Public Enlightenment and Propaganda
- In office 30 April 1945 – 5 May 1945 (Note: When the cabinet posts in the Flensburg Government were filled on May 5, 1945, the post of Minister of Public Enlightenment and Propaganda was no longer included.)
- Chancellor: Joseph Goebbels
- Leading Minister of Germany: Lutz von Krosigk
- Preceded by: Joseph Goebbels
- Succeeded by: Office abolished

Staatssekretär of the Ministry of Public Enlightenment and Propaganda
- In office 22 April 1944 – 30 April 1945
- Appointed by: Adolf Hitler
- Preceded by: Leopold Gutterer
- Succeeded by: Office abolished

Personal details
- Born: 16 June 1909 Guhrau, Province of Silesia, Kingdom of Prussia, Germany
- Died: 25 October 1982 (aged 73) Lüdenscheid, West Germany
- Party: Nazi Party (1928–1945)
- Other political affiliations: FDP (1951-1953); Deutsche Reichspartei (1953)

Werner Naumann (16 June 1909 – 25 October 1982) was a German civil servant and politician. He was State Secretary in Joseph Goebbels' Ministry of Public Enlightenment and Propaganda during the Nazi Germany era. He was appointed head of the Propaganda Ministry by Adolf Hitler in his last will and testament after Goebbels was promoted to Reichskanzler. Naumann was present in the Führerbunker in late April 1945. He eluded capture and led an underground existence under an assumed name until an amnesty in 1950. For the next few years, he headed a clandestine Neo-Nazi organization known as the Naumann Circle until it was exposed and he was arrested. He was subsequently judged to be a "Category II offender" in a denazification proceeding.

== Early life and political career ==
Naumann was born in Guhrau in Silesia, Prussia, Germany (today Góra, Lower Silesian Voivodship, Poland). After finishing school, he studied political economics. Naumann joined the Nazi Party in 1928. Naumann became a member of the SA where he rose to the rank of SA-Brigadeführer by 1933. Thereafter, Naumann transferred to the SS as an SS-Brigadeführer. In 1937 he became Chief of the Propaganda Office in Breslau.

Naumann participated in the German invasion of France and later transferred to Yugoslavia and Greece. He fought in the eastern front as a colonel of the Waffen-SS before being wounded in 1942. He was made the personal aide of Joseph Goebbels and became his assistant secretary in 1942. His official title was "Undersecretary and Chief of the Minister's Office in the Propaganda Ministry". In April 1944 Naumann was named State Secretary in the Propaganda Ministry. Rudolf Semmler stated that Naumann was Goebbels' right-hand man.

In the final days of Nazi Germany as Soviet forces took Berlin, he was appointed Propaganda Minister in the Goebbels cabinet by Hitler's Testament of 29 April 1945. After the suicide of Goebbels on 1 May, new Reich President Karl Dönitz asked Lutz Graf Schwerin von Krosigk to form a new cabinet. This became known as the Flensburg government and it did not contain a Ministry of Propaganda.

On 1 May 1945, Naumann was the leader of break-out group number 3 from the Führerbunker in Berlin. The group included Martin Bormann, Hans Baur, Ludwig Stumpfegger and Artur Axmann. Erich Kempka testified at Nuremberg that he had last seen Naumann walking a metre (a yard) in front of Bormann when a Soviet rocket exploded by Bormann while crossing the Weidendammer Bridge under heavy fire in Berlin. According to Axmann, the group followed a Tiger tank that spearheaded the first attempt to storm across the bridge, but it was destroyed. Bormann, Stumpfegger and himself were "knocked over" when the tank was hit. Axmann crawled to a shellhole where he met up again with Naumann, Bormann, Baur, and Stumpfegger; they all made it across the bridge. From that group, only Naumann and Axmann escaped from the Soviet Red Army encirclement of Berlin and made it to western Germany. Naumann, having removed all materials identifying him as a SS member and posing as a regular soldier, was captured by the Soviets at the Elbe and escaped after being imprisoned for four weeks.

It is in part due to rumors later spread by Naumann that the belief arose that Martin Bormann had survived the Second World War. According to Naumann, Bormann was not only still alive but, in his words, "was a Soviet spy and he must have arranged beforehand where to meet the Red Army advance units... Bormann now lives in Moscow". This led to shock waves within the CIA.

== Post-war life, Neo-Nazi activity and death ==
Naumann lived in the Soviet occupation zone and apprenticed as a mason. He was about to join the Socialist Unity Party and become chair of a commission for liquidating private property in summer 1946. Instead, he left for western Germany in 1946, and worked as a farmhand and bricklayer in Tübingen and Frankfurt. He lived under an assumed name for five years, but reemerged in early 1950 after an amnesty law had taken effect, and became the manager of an import-export company in Düsseldorf.

Naumann soon began making contact with other former Nazi functionaries politically active on the far-right, including Hans-Ulrich Rudel, Ernst Achenbach, Artur Axmann, Otto Skorzeny and many others. This group came to be known as the Naumann Circle (Naumann-Kreis) or the Gauleiter Circle. Achenbach stated that the group could make Naumann secretary general of the Free Democratic Party (FDP) in North Rhine-Westphalia with only 200 infiltrators. They infiltrated the FDP for a period of about two years. Naumann, together with six co-conspirators, was arrested by the British Army on 15 January 1953 for being the leader of a Neo-Nazi group that attempted to infiltrate West German political parties. Naumann was turned over to the German authorities on 1 April and, after over six months in custody, was released from pre-trial detention on 28 July 1953 by a decision of the Federal Constitutional Court at Karlsruhe.

On 5 August 1953, barely a week after his release, Naumann declared his intention to run for a seat in the Bundestag as a candidate of the right-wing Deutsche Reichspartei (DRP), which had benefited heavily from the banning of the Socialist Reich Party the previous year. However, on 23 August, just two weeks before the election, the state government of North Rhine-Westphalia, acting as a denazification tribunal, classified him as a Category II offender. As such, he was prohibited from belonging to any political party, engaging in any political activity, holding any political office, or working as an author, journalist or broadcaster for a period of five years. His Bundestag candidacy was thus abruptly ended.

The criminal investigation continued and, at its conclusion on 29 June 1954, the German prosecutors determined that there was sufficient evidence to proceed with a prosecution of Naumann on charges of leading an unconstitutional organization. However, just over five months later, on 3 December 1954, the criminal court in Karlsruhe found that the evidence did not support the charge and the criminal proceedings were dismissed. On 23 September 1955, just over two years after the imposition of the 5-year political and civil prohibitions against Naumann, they were lifted by the government of North Rhine-Westphalia, which determined that after the formal ending of the Allied occupation, the Allied Control Council directives that had vested the denazification authority in the state government were now deprived of effect.

Naumann joined the board of directors for an electronics company in Düren owned by Harald Quandt, the stepson of Goebbels. Naumann's book Nau Nau gefährdet das Empire? was published by Dürer Verlag in 1953. Naumann died in 1982 in Lüdenscheid, West Germany, aged 73. He was buried in the Kommunal cemetery of Piepersloh, Werkhagener Strasse, in Lüdenscheid.

== See also ==
- Naumann Circle

== Works cited ==
=== Books ===
- Beevor, Antony (2002). Berlin: The Downfall 1945. Viking-Penguin Books. ISBN 978-0-670-03041-5.
- Joachimsthaler, Anton (1999) [1995]. The Last Days of Hitler: The Legends, the Evidence, the Truth. Trans. Helmut Bögler. Brockhampton Press. ISBN 978-1-86019-902-8.
- Long, Wellington (1968). The New Nazis of Germany. Chilton Company.
- O'Donnell, James Preston (1978). The Bunker: The History of the Reich Chancellery Group. Houghton Mifflin. ISBN 978-0-395-25719-7.
- Tauber, Kurt (1967). Beyond Eagle and Swastika: German Nationalism Since 1945. Wesleyan University Press.
- Walters, Guy (2016). Naumann's War: The Life of Werner Naumann from 1909 to 1945.

=== Web ===
- "Declassified Document" (PDF). Central Intelligence Agency. 29 January 1953. Archived (PDF) from the original on 22 February 2025.
- "Official Dispatch" (PDF). Central Intelligence Agency. 30 January 1953. Archived (PDF) from the original on 22 February 2025.
- Menges, Franz: Werner Naumann in the Deutsche Biographie
- Newspaper clippings about Werner Naumann in the 20th Century Press Archives of the ZBW
