= Naumann Circle =

West German Neo-Nazi organization

- Named after: Werner Naumann
- Predecessor: Nazi Party
- Formation: c. 1951
- Founded at: Düsseldorf
- Dissolved: 1953
- Type: Neo-Nazi underground political organization
- Legal status: Defunct
- Location: West Germany
- Region served: North Rhine-Westphalia
- Members: c. 700–1,000
- Leader: Werner Naumann
- Affiliations: Free Democratic Party (FDP); German Party (DP); All-German Bloc (GB/BHE)

The Naumann Circle (German: Naumann-Kreis), also sometimes referred to as the Gauleiter Circle or the Naumann Affair, was an organization of former German adherents of the Nazi Party that was formed in the German Federal Republic (West Germany) several years after the end of the Second World War. It was founded and led by Werner Naumann, the last State Secretary of the Reich Ministry of Public Enlightenment and Propaganda. Between 1951 and early 1953, the organization attempted to infiltrate the Free Democratic Party (FDP) and two smaller parties to lay the groundwork for a possible return to power. British security forces disrupted the cabal by arresting Naumann and several of his associates in early 1953. Handed over to West German authorities, the accused were investigated but the charges ultimately were dismissed by the criminal court due to insufficient evidence.

== Background ==
Werner Naumann (1909–1982), studied law and political science and earned a doctorate in 1936. A member of the Nazi Party from 1928, he became a skilled propagandist and SS-Brigadeführer and, from 1938, worked directly with Joseph Goebbels, the Reichsminister for Propaganda. Naumann rose to become the State Secretary in the Ministry in April 1944 and was named in the Last will and testament of Adolf Hitler as Goebbels' successor as Reichsminister. Escaping from the Führerbunker in the closing days of the war, he went underground with an assumed name and worked as a farm worker, later completing an apprenticeship as a mason. He reemerged in early 1950 after an amnesty law had taken effect, and became the manager of an import-export company in Düsseldorf. The amnesty law was estimated to apply to some 800,000 individuals and it even applied to those Nazi officials and SS members who had assumed a false identity in 1945 in order to avoid prosecution.

Naumann soon began making contact with other former Nazi functionaries. It has been estimated that he developed a very wide network of contacts numbering perhaps as many as 1,000; his address book alone contained over 700 names. He set about organizing these contacts into an underground organization. His correspondence stressed the need for secrecy, and the organization made use of personal couriers, false addresses and code names. A series of regular monthly meetings began in February 1952. Naumann's contacts were not limited to Germany, but also included many Nazis who had fled abroad via the ratlines, such as Otto Skorzeny in Spain and Eberhard Fritsch, Johann von Leers and Hans-Ulrich Rudel in Argentina. He maintained frequent contact with these émigrés and the US CIA reported that, although his plans had not yet progressed to the point that he could direct their activities, he could expect their support whenever he decided to openly enter into political activities.

== Members ==
In addition to Naumann, the circle included many individuals who had held positions of responsibility in Nazi Germany, including seven of the forty-three Gauleiter, a number of his former colleagues in the Propaganda Ministry and many high-ranking Schutzstaffel (SS) officers, some of whom had been convicted of war crimes. The following is a partial list of the most prominent known members and associates:

- Ernst Achenbach, managing director of the Adolf Hitler Donation Fund and head of the political department at the German embassy in occupied Paris
- Gunter d'Alquen, journalist, chief editor of the weekly SS newspaper Das Schwarze Korps and an SS-Standartenführer
- Artur Axmann, Reichsjugendführer and leader of the Hitler Youth from 1940 to 1945
- Werner Best, head of Amt I (Administration) of the Gestapo in the Reich Security Main Office, Reich Plenipotentiary in Denmark and an SS-Obergruppenführer
- Karl Friedrich Bornemann, Hitler Youth Gebietsführer (Area Leader) in Düsseldorf
- Wolfgang Diewerge, Ministerial Councilor in the Reich Ministry of Propaganda
- Friedrich Karl Florian, Gauleiter of Gau Düsseldorf and an SA-Obergruppenführer.
- Alfred Frauenfeld, an early Gauleiter of Vienna before the Anschluss and wartime Generalkommissar in the occupied Crimea
- Hans Fritzsche, head of the Press Office and, later, the Radio Office in the Ministry of Propaganda; acquitted in the Nuremberg Trials
- Josef Grohé, Gauleiter of Gau Cologne-Aachen and Reichskommissar for the Reichskommissariat of Belgium and Northern France
- Heinrich Haselmayer, leader of the National Socialist German Students' League in Hamburg and a physician who published works advocating sterilization of persons considered "genetically diseased"
- Paul Hausser, SS-Oberstgruppenführer, Generaloberst of the Waffen-SS and the first chairman of the Mutual Aid Association of Former Waffen-SS Members
- Karl Kaufmann, Gauleiter and Reichsstatthalter (Reich Governor) of Gau Hamburg and an SS-Obergruppenführer
- Wilhelm Keppler, businessman and financier, founder of the Freundeskreis der Wirtschaft, State Secretary in the Foreign Ministry, and an SS-Obergruppenführer; sentenced to ten years in prison in the Ministries Trial but released in February 1951
- Hartmann Lauterbacher, Gauleiter of Gau Southern Hanover-Brunswick, Oberpräsident of the Province of Hanover, the Deputy to Reichsjugendführer Baldur von Schirach and an SS-Obergruppenführer
- Wilhelm Meinberg, Reich Chairman of the Reichsnährstand and an SS-Gruppenführer who would become the Chairman of the Deutsche Reichspartei from 1955 to 1960
- Karl Scharping, Government Councilor and Hans Fritzsche's deputy in the Radio Department of the Propaganda Ministry
- Gustav Adolf Scheel, Gauleiter and Reichsstatthalter of Reichsgau Salzburg, the former Reich Student Leader and an SS-Obergruppenführer
- Paul Karl Schmidt, Ministerial Director and Press Chief in the Foreign Office and an SS-Obersturmbannführer
- Günther Schwägermann, adjutant to Joseph Goebbels and an SS-Hauptsturmführer
- Heinz Siepen, a Nazi Party Ortsgruppenleiter in Solingen and a Landrat in Reichsgau Wartheland
- Franz Six, head of Amt VII (Ideological Research) in the Reich Security Main Office, an Einsatzkommando commander in the Soviet Union and an SS-Brigadeführer; sentenced to 20 years in prison for mass murder, released in October 1952
- Eberhard Taubert, Ministerial Director and head of the Anti-Komintern department in the Ministry of Propaganda and a judge at the People's Court
- Edmund Veesenmayer, Reich Plenipotentiary in Hungary, where he was involved in the Holocaust, and an SS-Brigadeführer; sentenced to 20 years in prison for crimes against humanity but released in December 1951
- Paul Wegener, Gauleiter of Gau Weser-Ems, Reichstatthalter of Oldenburg and Bremen, and an SS-Obergruppenführer
- Paul Zimmermann, SS-Brigadeführer and an SS and Police Leader in the Soviet Union

== Aims ==
The primary aim of the organization was to work in the background to place a few hundred trusted men into key positions in military veterans associations, in organizations of farmers and small businessmen and in local administrations, and to turn them into a strong, unified force that eventually could supplant the established democratic parties. In addition, they sought to place adherents into leadership roles in the parties themselves, to enable them to influence and seize control of the parties from within. Naumann set about developing a plan to infiltrate existing political parties, with the main target being the Free Democratic Party (FDP), a secular, free-market oriented, centrist party. Two smaller more conservative parties, the German Party (DP) and the All-German Bloc were also to be penetrated. Naumann targeted the FDP and the DP in particular because, as mainstream parties and participants in the first coalition cabinet of Chancellor Konrad Adenauer, they could prove to be viable vehicles for advancing his viewpoints and policies. This contrasted with the overtly neo-Nazi Socialist Reich Party that, because of its extreme views, was found to be unconstitutional and was banned by the Federal Constitutional Court on 23 October 1952 on the basis of being a successor organization to the Nazi Party.

== Infiltration of the FDP ==
After the defeat of Nazi Germany in May 1945, former members of the Nazi Party underwent denazification procedures. This resulted in those judged to be "offenders" either being jailed, paying fines or being banned from participation in electoral politics. However, the vast majority of Party members were determined to be "followers" or "exonerated" and never faced criminal prosecution or civil penalties. These individuals joined various political parties, including the FDP. The FDP Bundestag members at the end of 1950 voted in favor of ending the denazification process altogether, thus attracting additional support from former Nazis. At their party conference in Munich in 1951 the FDP demanded the release of all "so-called war criminals" and welcomed the establishment of the Verband deutscher Soldaten (German Soldiers' Association), an organization of former Wehrmacht and SS members, in order to advance the integration of former Nazi forces into the political system. In particular, the very nationalist FDP state association of North Rhine-Westphalia, under the leadership of Friedrich Middelhauve, enthusiastically welcomed ex-servicemen and former Nazi Party members in order to expand its voter base to the right. Ernst Achenbach, as a state Landtag member, together with Werner Best, coordinated a campaign to advocate for a general amnesty for war criminals. He and Middelhauve envisioned creating a unified organization of all the right wing parties along the lines of the Weimar Republic-era Harzburg Front, an effort they dubbed the Nationale Sammlung (National Collective).

In the summer of 1952, Middelhauve presented to the state party conference in Bielefeld the so-called "German Program", which had been formulated largely with input from Naumann, Best, Fritzsche and Six. The text included revanchist ideas such as refusing to renounce the right of expelled Germans to return to their home territories, and also voiced objections to the Allies judgments of former soldiers. Middelhauve presented the program at the FDP federal party conference at Bad Ems in November 1952 but it was not adopted at the federal level, in order to forestall a split in the party. Nevertheless, Middelhauve emerged from the party conference strengthened when he was elected as one of two deputy party leaders. In the municipal elections of November 1952, some fifty former Nazi officials in North Rhine Westphalia were elected to office as candidates of the FDP.

Many observers were alarmed by the FDP's rightward shift. The Frankfurter Rundschau characterized the events at the party conference as the "intra-party January 30th of the FDP", referring to Adolf Hitler's 1933 assumption of power; France's Le Monde stated that the FDP was on the way to transforming itself into a "nationalist and reactionary movement of the extreme right". The FDP, along with the DP, was viewed as part of an "extremist" bloc in an analysis by US intelligence officials.

A study by Michael Klepsch in 2009 examined a total of 451 state Landtag deputies in North Rhine-Westphalia who had been at least 18 years old at the end of the war. His findings revealed 41 men with past Nazi Party membership, among whom were full-time Party officials and members of the SS or Waffen-SS. Eight served as parliamentary faction leaders and two became ministers in the state government. The proportion of former Nazis in the post-war years was particularly high in the FDP, with more than one in five FDP members of the state parliament having a Nazi past. Between 1955 and 1975, the FDP parliamentary faction was led by six former Nazis, including three SS men.

The outlook was similar in the FDP party organizations in the states of Lower Saxony and Hesse. In Lower Saxony, the FDP state manager was Horst Huisgen, a former employee of the Propaganda Ministry and once the Hitler Youth leader of Upper Silesia. In Hesse, from December 1952 the DP state chairman was Helmuth Schranz, the former Oberbürgermeister and Nazi Party Kreisleiter of Offenbach am Main. Numerous former Nazi officials were active in both these parties as well as in the All German Bloc. All three parties also employed as organizers or candidates many former functionaries of the recently dissolved Socialist Reich Party.

== British actions of January 1953 ==
On the night of 14-15 January 1953, British security forces who had been surveilling the Naumann Circle and secretly wiretapping its telephone communications, acted on the orders of British High Commissioner Sir Ivone Kirkpatrick and arrested Naumann and six other members of the organization (Haselmeyer, Kaufmann, Scharping, Scheel, Siepen and Zimmermann) in Düsseldorf and Hamburg. They were held in captivity by the British at Werl Prison. Evidence seized in the raids included the manuscripts of two speeches that Naumann had delivered to his circle of intimates in November 1952, his diary going back to 1950, note books with appointments and a great deal of other correspondence.

The British acted on the basis of their reserved powers under the Occupation Statute. They alleged that Naumann and his associates were engaged in a plot to overthrow the German government and, thereby, endangered the security of the Allied troops. The British High Commissioner informed the Adenauer government, including federal FDP politicians Theodor Heuss (Federal President), Thomas Dehler (Federal Justice Minister) and Franz Blücher (Vice-Chancellor and FDP Chairman) about what the surveillance had uncovered. There was indignation at the perceived encroachment on German national sovereignty in the public and the press. The initial reaction by the German government was skepticism and a degree of hostility. Interior Minister Robert Lehr stated that the group was well known to the government, that it was numerically small and that it did not appear to the German authorities that intervention was called for.

== German legal proceedings ==
The British authorities concluded their investigation and, though they released Kaufmann on grounds of ill health, on 1 April they turned over the remaining detainees to the German government for possible trial. After reviewing the documentary evidence that had been seized, the German attitude toward the affair changed, with Adenauer releasing a statement that the accused had been plotting to seize power within the next few years and that they not only were in contact with foreign Nazi elements in Spain and South America, but that they were receiving foreign financial assistance from supporters in Britain, France and Belgium. The government announced its intention to prosecute the accused on the basis of "forming a secret alliance endangering the security of the State and being members of an unconstitutional association". The German government released from pre-trial detention five of the lesser-known participants: Scharping and Haselmeyer on 2 April, Siepen on 25 April and Scheel and Zimmermann on 16 June. That left in custody only Naumann and Karl Friedrich Bornemann (who had been at large in the American Occupation Zone, and surrendered himself to German authorities in April). Finally on 28 July, after six hours of deliberations, the Federal Constitutional Court at Karlsruhe determined that the last two detainees could be set free, as it was unlikely that they would be able to conceal their identity or escape.

On 5 August 1953, barely a week after his release, Naumann declared his intention to run for a seat in the Bundestag as a candidate of the right-wing Deutsche Reichspartei (DRP) and he was supported by DRP Chairman Adolf von Thadden. Because of his incendiary rhetoric, Naumann was banned from speaking in Dortmund, Munich, Hesse and Hamburg, and was briefly arrested for violating the ban in Hamburg. Then, on 23 August, just two weeks before the election, the state government of North Rhine-Westphalia, acting as a denazification tribunal, classified him as a Category II offender. As such, he was prohibited from belonging to any political party, engaging in any political activity, holding any political office, or working as an author, journalist or broadcaster for a period of five years. His nascent political career was thus effectively derailed.

Investigations continued and, on 29 June 1954, the German prosecutors determined that there was sufficient evidence to proceed with a prosecution of Naumann and Bornemann on charges of leading an unconstitutional organization. At the same time, they concluded that there was insufficient evidence to support charges against the other six members of the group. Just over five months later, on 3 December 1954, the criminal court in Karlsruhe found that the evidence did not support the charge of "ringleadership in an anti-constitutional organization" and the criminal proceedings were dismissed. The court concluded that although the two defendants had espoused National Socialist and anti-constitutional ideas, their organization had no political effectiveness and the evidence did not demonstrate any results.

== Aftermath ==
The FDP formed its own internal three-person investigative commission headed by Justice Minister Dehler, which focused on the state association of North Rhine-Westphalia. At the end of April 1953, the national leadership forced Achenbach to step down as head of the FDP Committee on Foreign Policy; however, his expulsion from the Party sought by Dehler was not approved. North Rhine-Westphalia State Chairman Middelhauve retained his position, though his personal secretary, Diwerge, and two other officials lost their posts. There was no massive purge, and the great majority of former Nazi adherents who had infiltrated the organization were left in place.

In the Bundestag election of 6 September 1953, the FDP won 9.5% of the vote, down from 11.9% in 1949 and they lost four seats. The DP won 3.25%, down from 4.0% and they lost two seats. The All-German Bloc, which was formed after the 1949 election, won 5.9% of the vote and entered the Bundestag for the first time. All three parties joined the center-right coalition of Adenauer's second administration. The DRP, the most right-wing entity and banned from participating in three of the nine states (Hesse, North Rhine-Westphalia, and Baden-Württemberg), won only 1.1% and lost all five of its seats.

On 23 September 1955, just over two years after the imposition of the 5-year political and civil prohibitions against Naumann, they were lifted by the government of North Rhine-Westphalia, which determined that after the formal ending of the Allied occupation, the Allied Control Council directives that had vested the denazification authority in the state government were now deprived of effect. Despite this, Naumann never stood for election again, and he died in 1982.

== Sources ==
- Baldow, Beate (2012) Episode oder Gefahr? Die Naumann-Affäre
- Braunes Erbe In: Antifa Infoblatt 92, (2011)
- Frei, Norbert (2002). Adenauer's Germany and the Nazi Past. Columbia University Press. ISBN 978-0-231-11882-8.
- Frei, Norbert (2004). "Coping with the Burdens of the Past: German Politics and Society in the 1950s". In Geppert, Dominick (ed.). The Postwar Challenge: Cultural, Social, and Political Change in Western Europe, 1945-1958. Oxford: Oxford University Press. ISBN 978-0-199-26665-4.
- Loubichi, Stefan: (2014) Der Naumann-Kreis in Zukunft braucht Erinnerung
- Lyman, Stanford M. (1995). NATO and Germany: a Study in the Sociology of Supernational Relations. Fayetteville: University of Arkansas Press. ISBN 978-1-557-28389-4.
- Menges, Franz: Werner Naumann in the Deutsche Biographie
- Nazis und Nationale Sammlung: Pflicht nach rechts In: Antifa Infoblatt 59, (2003)
- Tauber, Kurt P. (1967). Beyond Eagle and Swastika: German Nationalism Since 1945. Middletown, Conn.: Wesleyan University Press.
- "Western Germany". The American Jewish Yearbook. 55. Springer: American Jewish Committee: 238–243. 1954.
- Zentner, Christian; Bedürftig, Friedemann, eds. (1997) [1991]. The Encyclopedia of the Third Reich. New York: Da Capo Press. ISBN 978-0-306-80793-0.
