= Selmer (given name) =

Selmer is a masculine or feminine given name which may refer to:

- Selmer Bringsjord (born 1958), American computer scientist
- Selmer W. Gunderson (1890–1972), American politician
- Selmer Jackson (1888–1971), American actor
- Selmer M. Johnson (1916–1996), American mathematician
