= Beyond Eagle and Swastika =

Book by Kurt P. Tauber

Beyond Eagle and Swastika: German Nationalism Since 1945
- Author: Kurt P. Tauber
- Language: English
- Subject: German nationalism
- Publisher: Wesleyan University Press
- Publication date: 1967
- Publication place: United States
- Media type: Print
- Pages: 1,589
- OCLC: 407180
- Dewey Decimal: 320.1580943
- LC Class: DD257.2 .T3

Beyond Eagle and Swastika: German Nationalism Since 1945 is a book by Kurt P. Tauber. It is a history and analysis of (and a reference work on) anti-democratic nationalism in postwar Germany. It was completed in 1963 after ten years of research. Wesleyan University Press, of Middletown, Connecticut, published it in two volumes (spanning 1,598 pages) in 1967.

The book includes portraits of many nationalist figures mentioned in its text. Most of these images are attributed to the Frankfurter Politisches Archiv mit Bilderdienst (fpa), a photo service of Fred Henrich specializing in right-wing personalities.

== Reception ==
Beyond Eagle and Swastika was called "a monumental work" by Louis Leo Snyder in a review for The Annals of the American Academy of Political and Social Science. Gordon A. Craig said that it was a "scholarly tour de force" in a review comparing it to Ferenc A. Váli's The Quest for a United Germany.
