= Ernst Achenbach =

German lawyer and politician

Member of the Bundestag
- In office 15 October 1957 – 13 December 1976

Personal details
- Born: 9 April 1909 Siegen, Westphalia, German Empire
- Died: 2 December 1991 (aged 82) Essen, Germany
- Party: Free Democratic Party
- Other political affiliations: Nazi Party (until 1945)

Ernst Achenbach (9 April 1909 – 2 December 1991) was a German lawyer, diplomat and politician of the liberal Free Democratic Party (FDP), who served as a member of the Bundestag (1957–1976), as a Member of the European Parliament (1964–1977), as Vice Chairman of FDP (1971–1972) and as Vice President of the Liberal group in the European Parliament.

Achenbach was a member of the Nazi Party prior to 1945 and served in the German Embassy in Paris during World War II, where he was responsible for rounding up 2,000 Jews as hostages.

== Early life and World War II ==
Achenbach, a Protestant by faith, attended High School in Gelsenkirchen. Subsequently, he studied law in Paris, Berlin, Hamburg and Bonn. After the first state examination in 1931, he pursued further studies and graduated in 1936, and began working as Managing Director of the Adolf Hitler Fund, involved with the collection of donations. He became a formal member of the Nazi Party in 1937.

Achenbach joined the German foreign service in 1939 and served at the German Embassy in Paris. During the German occupation of France (1940–1944), he was from June 1940 to May 1943, head of the embassy's Political Department, and a close collaborator of German ambassador Otto Abetz. In that framework, Achenbach was also responsible for implementing the deportation of the Jews. In 1944/45 he was a soldier and after the war he led American investigators to believe that the German embassy in France had been a stronghold of the conspiracy against Hitler.

== Post-war ==
=== Law practices ===
From 1946, Achenbach worked as a lawyer in Essen, and defended both Alexander von Falkenhausen and Eggert Reeder at their trial for war crimes in Belgium in 1951.

In the early 1950s, Achenbach advocated for the amnesty of the German war criminals. Towards this goal, in 1951, he organized a lobby group which employed Werner Best, former deputy chief of the SD, and Franz Six, one of the leaders of mobile killing units in the Soviet Union and a convicted war criminal. These activities led to a scandal in 1970 when he initially failed to make it as a Commissioner in the European Economic Community because of public pressure. In 1974, Achenbach's involvement in the Holocaust became public knowledge and he was forced to resign from this position.

=== Political career ===
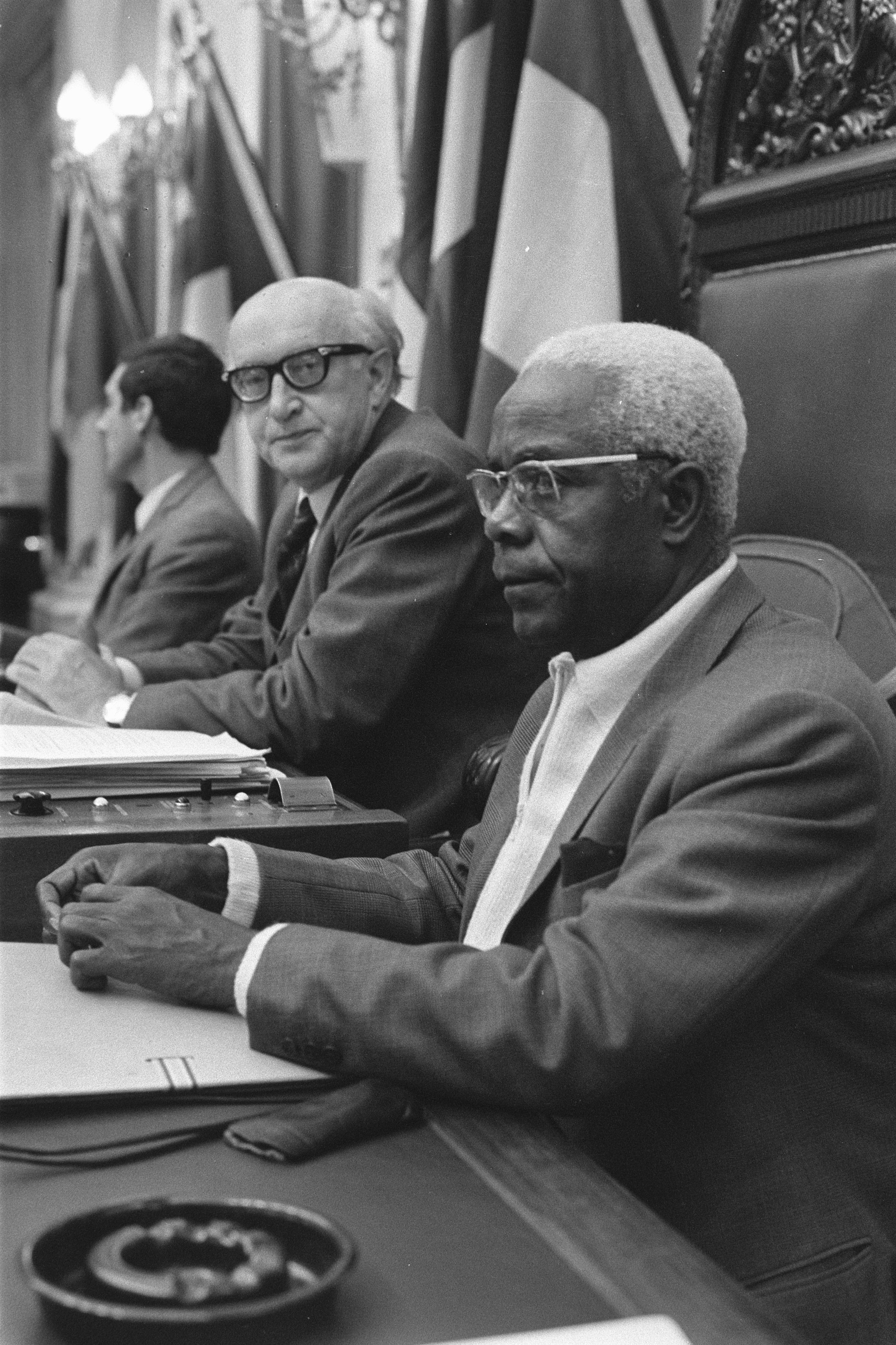
Achenbach (middle) (1972)

After the war, Achenbach joined the Free Democratic Party (FDP), served as its foreign affairs spokesman and was elected to the Landtag of the state of North Rhine-Westphalia. He was considered the right hand of the FDP State Chairman Friedrich Middelhauve and was responsible for fundraising from industry donations. He was assisted by his contacts from his time as CEO of the Foundation Adolf Hitler Fund, including Hugo Stinnes, Jr., Heinz Wilke, Wolfgang Diewerge, etc., all of whom were former Nazis.

Achenbach supported admitting former Nazis into the FDP and, together with Middelhauve, advocated a "National Collective" of all right wing parties. He was a close associate of Werner Naumann, the head of the Naumann Circle, a clandestine group of former Nazis who were actively infiltrating the FDP. After the organization was exposed and Naumann was arrested in January 1953, Achenbach served for a time as his attorney. In the aftermath, the national party leadership forced Achenbach to step down from his post as foreign affairs spokesman in April 1953, though an attempt to expel him from the party did not succeed.

From 1953 to 1959 Achenbach was Chairman of the FDP Ruhr District Association and from 1970 to 1973 of the Ruhr District Association West. From 1957 to 1976 he was a member of the Bundestag and from December 7, 1971, to 1972, Achenbach served as Vice Chairman of the FDP. Throughout much of the 1960s and 1970s he was involved in foreign policy and defense. From 1969 to 1974 for instance he was Chairman of the Committee on Relations with African Countries and Madagascar, and then until 1976, a member of the Committee on Development and Cooperation. As an active member of the Foreign Affairs Committee in the Bundestag until 1976, he was responsible for the Franco-German Supplementary Agreement to Transition signed in 1971, and successfully prevented its ratification until 1974 when he was discredited by the campaigns of Beate and Serge Klarsfeld.

== Honours ==
- Order of Merit of the Federal Republic of Germany (1968)
- Order of Merit of the Federal Republic of Germany (1971)
