= Wenche Selmer =

Norwegian architect (1920–1998)

- Born: Wenche Elisabeth Reimers; 23 May 1920; Paris, France
- Died: 30 May 1998 (aged 78); Oslo, Norway
- Education: Oslo School of Architecture and Design; École des Beaux-Arts
- Occupation: Architect
- Spouse(s): James Robert Collett (1914-1941). Jens Andreas Selmer (1911-1995)
- Practice: Associated architectural firm[s]

Wenche Elisabeth Selmer (23 May 1920 – 30 May 1998) was a Norwegian architect. She specialized in timber architecture, working residential projects. Her wooden cabins and houses were inspired by nature and designed to not overwhelm or dominate but rather blend with the natural landscape.

== Biography ==
Wenche Elisabeth Reimers was born in Paris, France, where her father was practicing law. She was the daughter of attorney Herman Foss Reimers (1874–1961) and Birgit Bødtker Næss (1882–1945). Her family returned to Norway when she was six years old and settled at Vestre Aker in Oslo. She graduated from the Norwegian National Academy of Craft and Art Industry (Statens håndverks- og kunstindustriskole) in 1945. After graduating, she apprenticed with architect Arnstein Arneberg who was married to her older half-sister, Eva Reimers (1901–1987). She followed with a year of training with architect Marcel Lods at the Ecole des Beaux-Arts in Paris. From 1948 she worked for architects Arne Pedersen (1897–1951) and Reidar Winge Lund (1908–1978) in Oslo. In 1954, she started her architectural firm and began a collaboration with Jens Andreas Selmer. She taught at the Oslo School of Architecture and Design from 1976 to 1987.

== Awards ==
- 1962-63 - Sundts premie, with Jens Selmer
- 1969 - Treprisen, with Jens Selmer

== Personal life ==
In 1941, she married James Robert Collett (1914–1941). In 1954, she married Jens Andreas Selmer (1911–1995)

== Other sources ==
- Elisabeth Tostrup (2006) Norwegian Wood: The Thoughtful Architecture of Wenche Selmer (Princeton Architectural Press) ISBN 978-1568985930
