= Rudolf Semmler =

Rudolf Semler (born 1913) was a journalist who worked as an aide to Joseph Goebbels in the Reich Ministry of Popular Enlightenment and Propaganda. In 1947, his diary was published in London under the title Goebbels: The Man Next to Hitler with the publisher John Westhouse. It covers the period from December 1940 to the end of the war and is a valuable source for historians of Nazi Germany. In the book the name of the author is wrongly given as Rudolf Semmler instead of Semler. He started his job with Goebbels in January 1941.
