= Duisburg =

City in North Rhine-Westphalia, Germany

Duisburg Duisborg (Low German)
- City
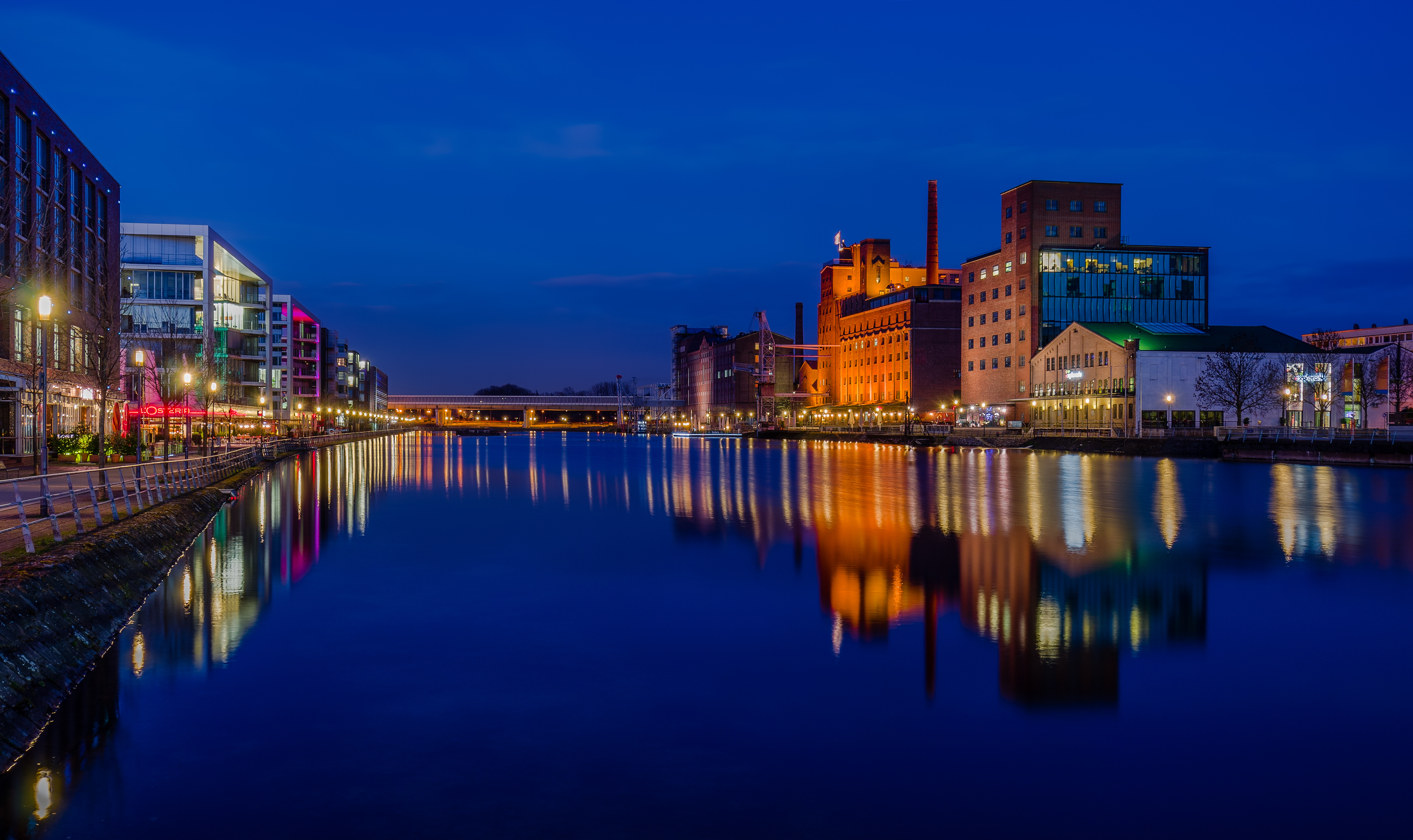
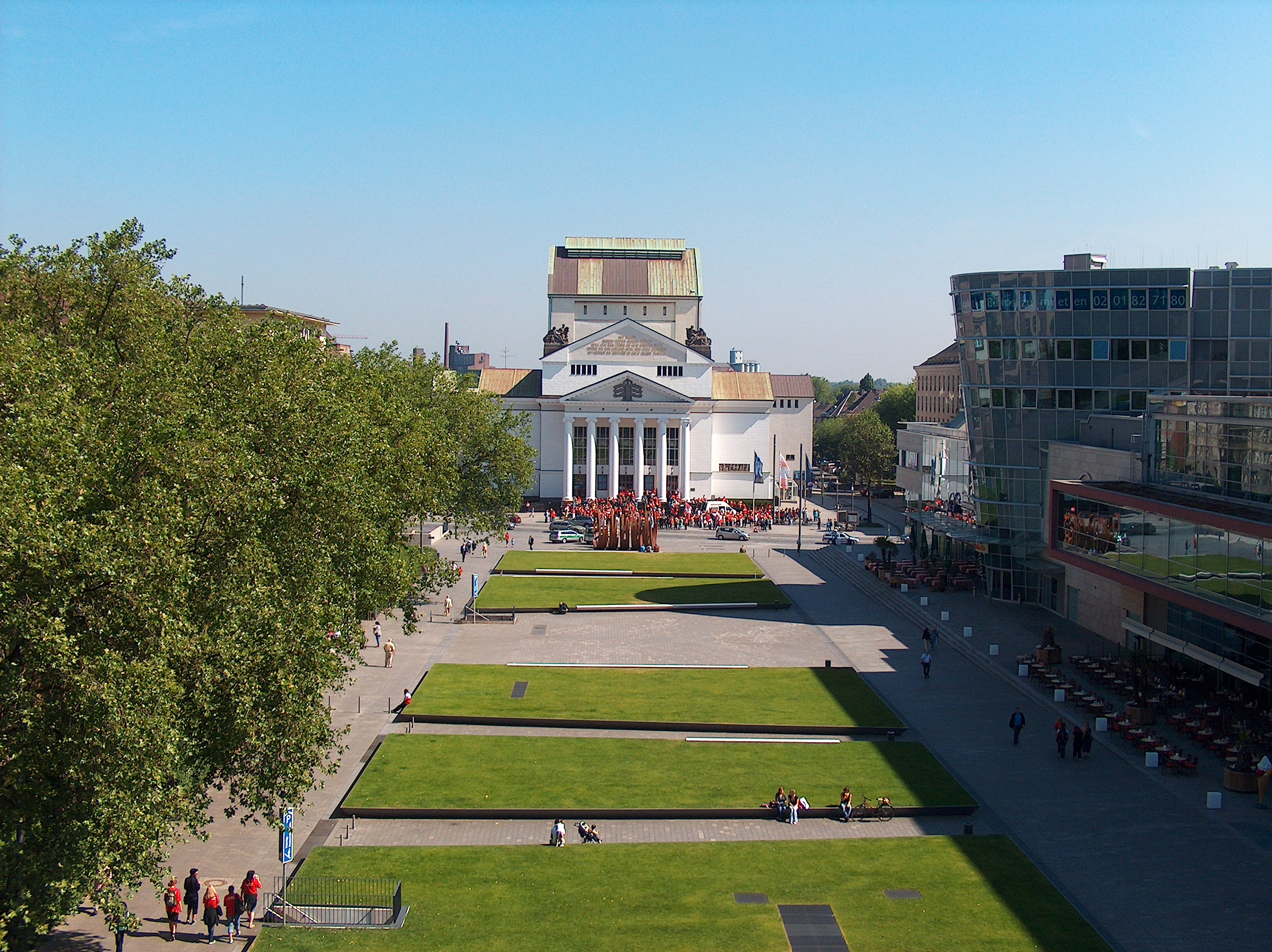
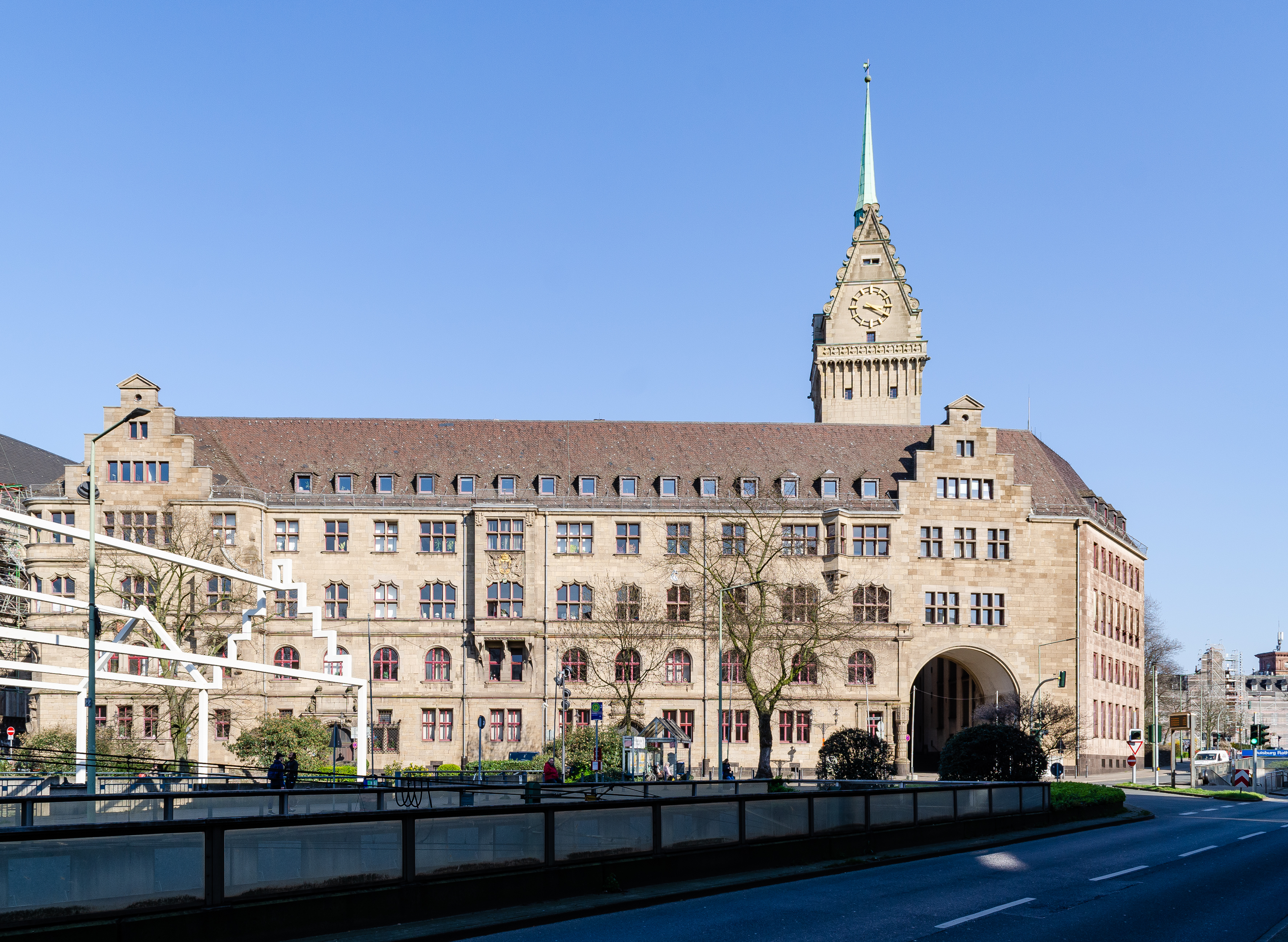
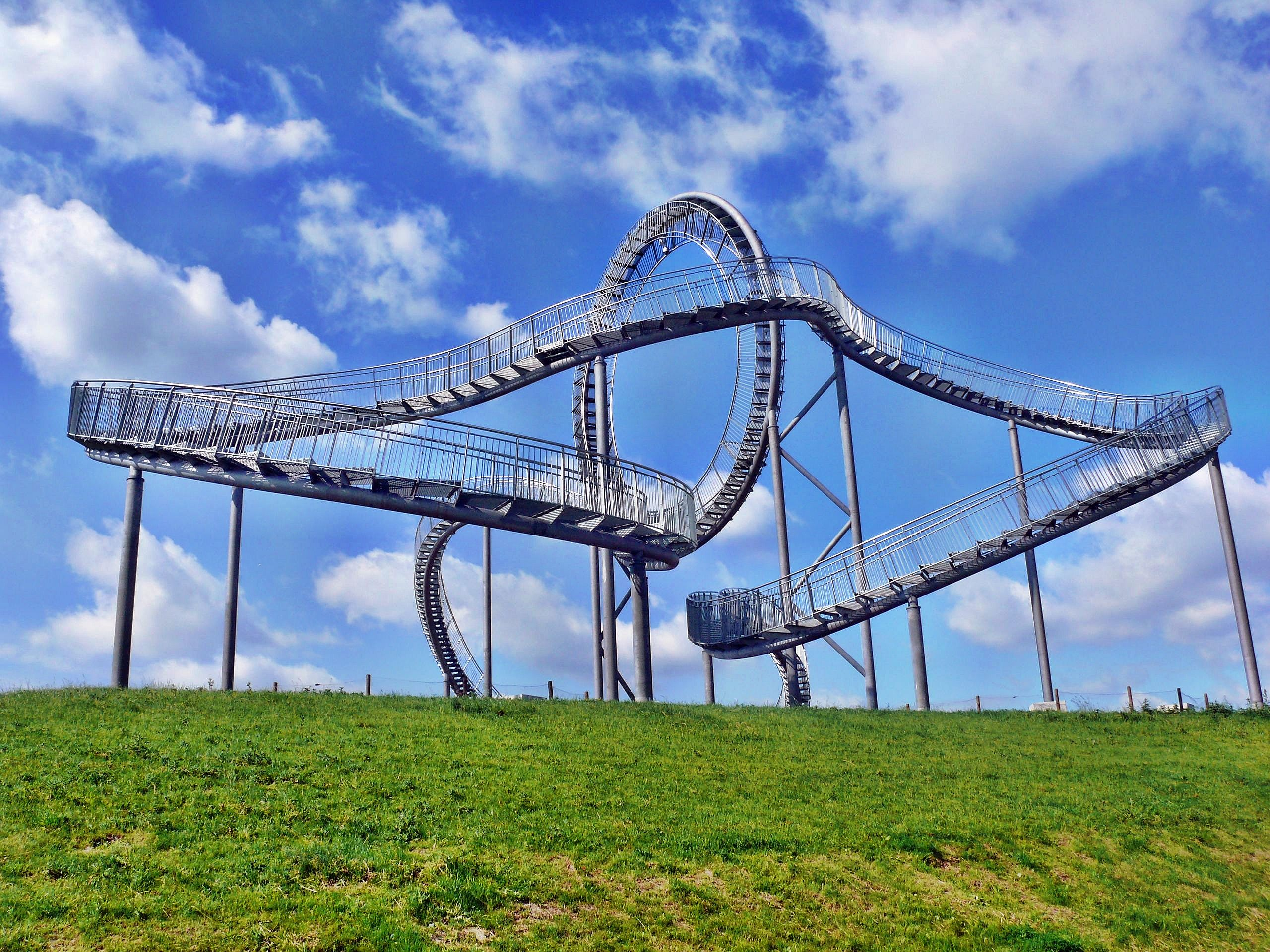
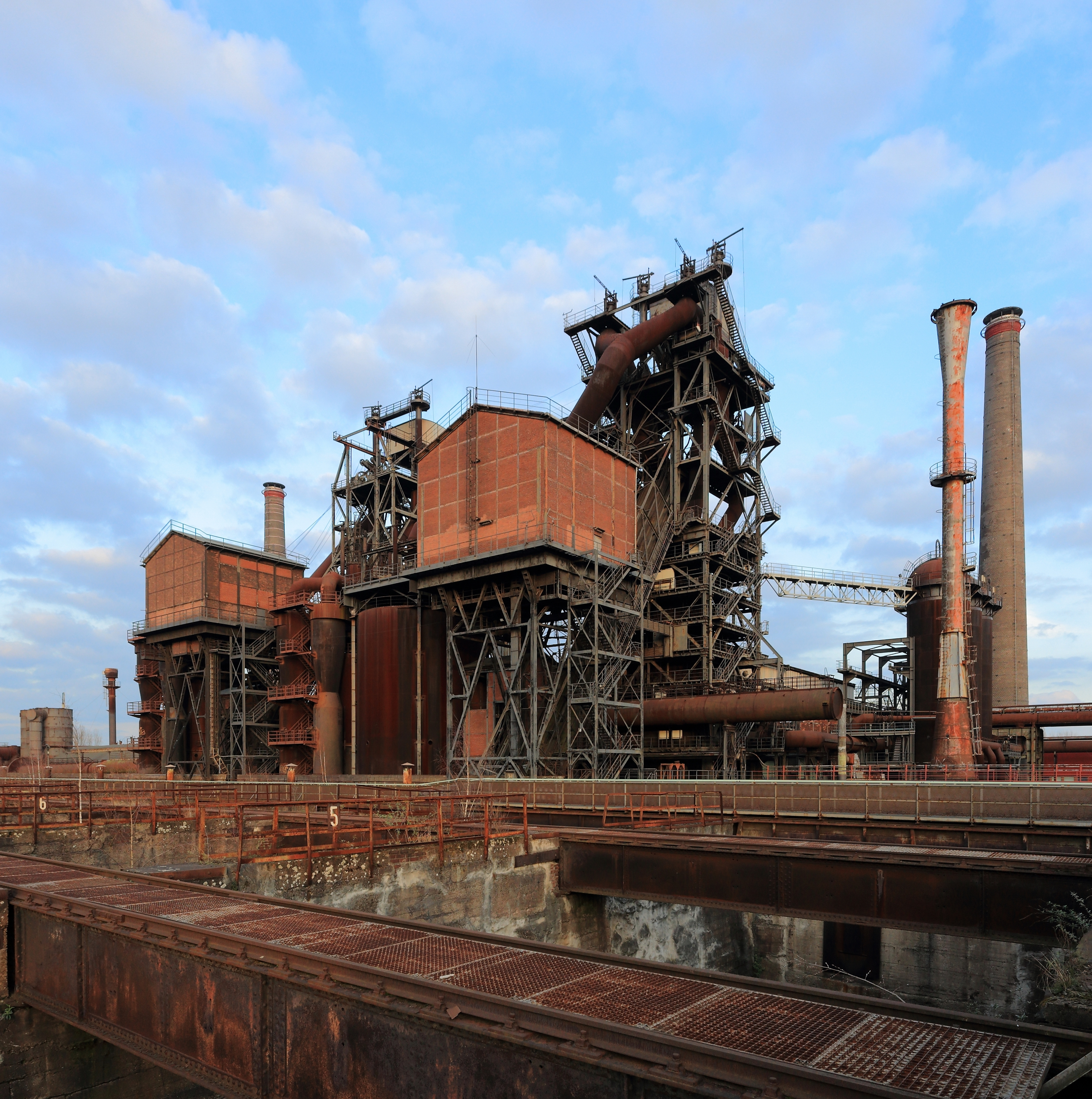
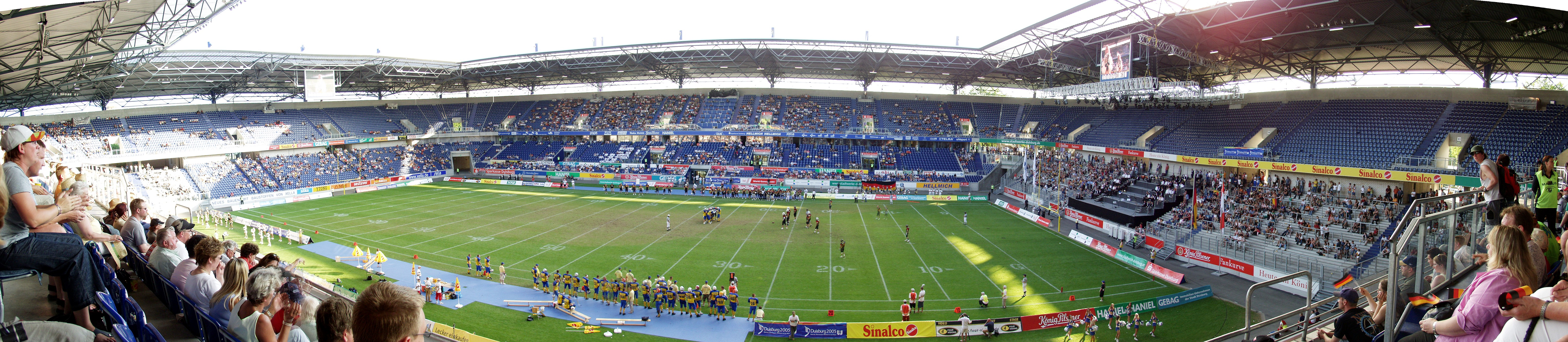
- Duisburg Inner Harbour Theater Duisburg Duisburg City Hall Tiger and Turtle – Magic Mountain Landschaftspark Duisburg-Nord MSV-Arena

- Flag Coat of arms

- Location of Duisburg within NRW
- Interactive map of Duisburg
- Location within Germany Location within North Rhine-Westphalia
- Coordinates: 51°26′05″N 6°45′45″E
- Country: Germany
- State: North Rhine-Westphalia
- Admin. region: Düsseldorf
- District: Urban district
- Subdivisions: 7 boroughs, 46 suburbs

Government
  - Mayor (2025–30): Sören Link (SPD)
  - Governing parties: SPD/ CDU/ JUDU

Area
  - City: 232.82 km^{2} (89.89 sq mi)
- Elevation: 31 m (102 ft)

Population (2025-12-31)
  - City: 500,810
  - Density: 2,151.1/km^{2} (5,571.2/sq mi)
  - Metro: 8,711,712 (Rhineland)
- Time zone: UTC+01:00 (CET)
  - Summer (DST): UTC+02:00 (CEST)
- Postal codes: 47001–47279
- Dialling codes: 0203
- Vehicle registration: DU
- Website: www.duisburg.de

Duisburg (German: [ˈdyːsbʊʁk]; Low German: Duisborg [ˈdʏsbɔɐ̯χ]) is a major city in western Germany, located in the state of North Rhine-Westphalia. With around half a million inhabitants, it is one of the largest cities in the Ruhr area and part of the larger Rhine-Ruhr metropolitan region, one of the biggest population centers in Europe. Duisburg is situated at the confluence of the Ruhr and the Rhine, a geographic position that has historically made it an important center of trade, industry, and transportation. Administratively, Duisburg forms an independent city (kreisfreie Stadt).

The city is known for hosting Europe's largest inland port, the Port of Duisburg, which plays a key role in European logistics and international trade. The port's facilities are directly linked to major motorways, rail networks, and the Rhine waterway, connecting Duisburg to the North Sea and beyond. Today, Duisburg is a hub for the steel, chemical, and logistics industries, and it has also become an important node in trade relations with China, being a key terminus for freight trains on the Chongqing–Xinjiang–Europe railway.

Historically, Duisburg traces its origins back to a Frankish settlement and was first documented in the 9th century. During the Middle Ages, it developed as a trading town on the Rhine and briefly served as a member of the Hanseatic League. Although the city lost importance after the silting of its old Rhine port in the late medieval period, it gained renewed significance with the rise of heavy industry in the 19th century. The expansion of coal mining, ironworks, and steel production transformed Duisburg into one of Germany's key industrial centers during the Industrial Revolution.

Modern Duisburg combines its industrial legacy with cultural and educational institutions such as the University of Duisburg-Essen, one of the largest universities in Germany. The city is also home to theaters, museums, and sports venues, while its industrial heritage sites, such as the Landschaftspark Duisburg-Nord, have been repurposed into landmarks of cultural tourism. Like much of the Ruhr area, Duisburg has undergone structural change in recent decades, shifting from heavy industry to a more diversified economy that includes services, logistics, and research.

== Etymology ==
The first syllable of the name of the city could go back to the Proto-Indo-European root *dʰeus-, meaning something like "wet area" or "flood plain". Duisburg therefore could mean "fortified place in the floodplain". Another interpretation assumes that the name is derived from the Old German "duis" which means "hill". Duisburg could mean something like "castle on the hill". Thus, a place on a hill overlooking the Rhine, that could refer to the area of the present Town Hall. Duisburggau (Diuspurgau) was also the name of the medieval Gau (country subdivision) on the Lower Rhine.

== History ==
=== Roman period and Middle Ages ===
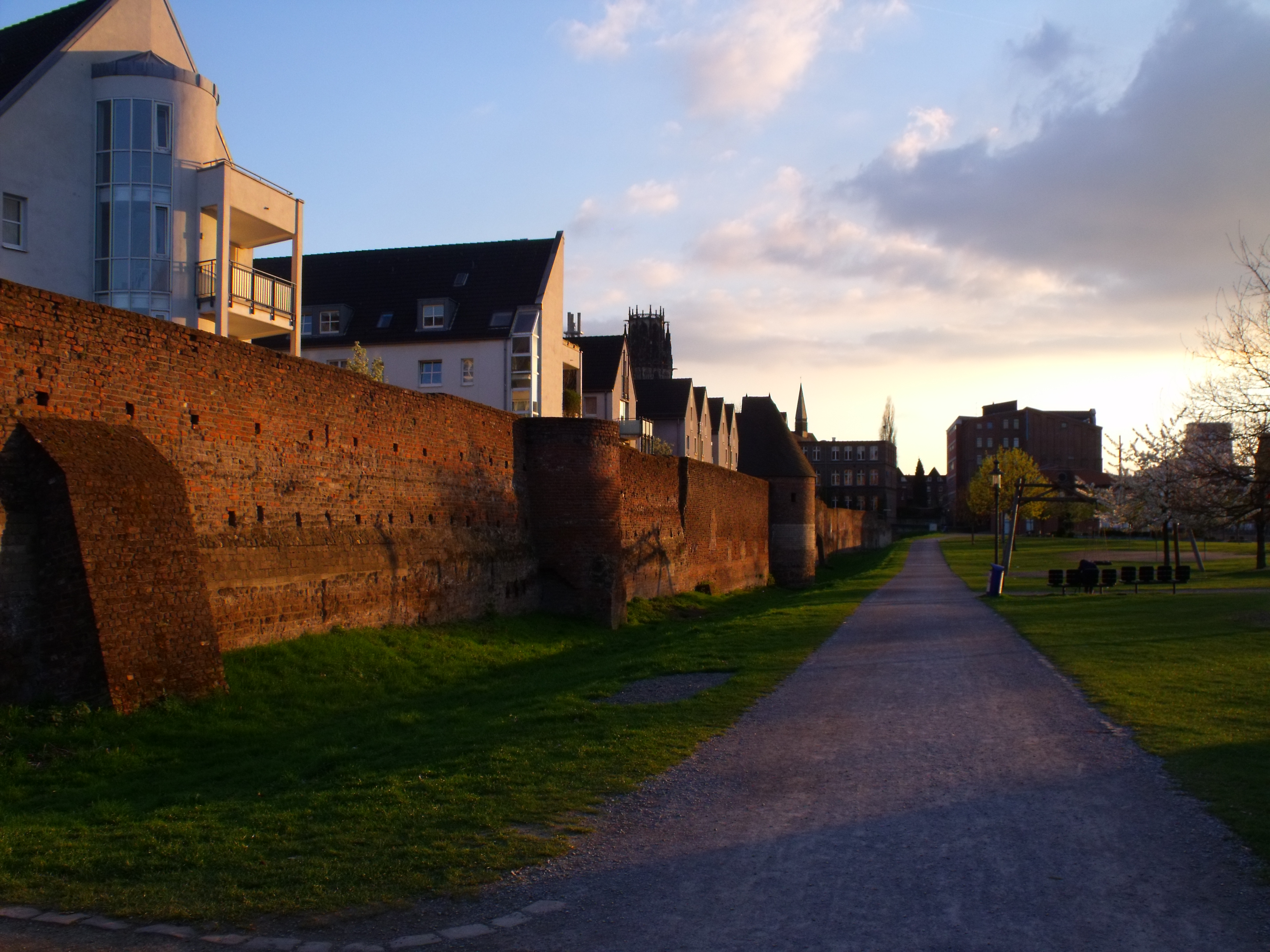
Remains of the city wall

Duisburg developed at the confluence of the Ruhr and the Rhine, on the outer bank of the Rhine and at the western end of the Hellweg trade route. Continuous settlement in the city's core area can be traced from the 1st century, initially Roman and from the 5th century onward Frankish.

In 420, the Franks seized the former Roman settlement and recolonised it. By the 8th century, a Frankish–Carolingian royal estate had been established, which later developed into a palatinate. Duisburg was first mentioned in 883 as Diusburh, when Norman raiders captured the settlement and remained there over the winter.

Due to the town's favorable geographic position a count palatine was established and the town was soon granted the royal charter of a free imperial city. Duisburg became a member of the Hanseatic League. Around 1000 the river Rhine moved westward from the town. This put an end to the Duisburg's development as a trading town and it soon transformed into a predominantly agrarian settlement.

Construction of the city walls began in 1120, and the city charter was granted by King Lothar III in 1279. By 1290, Duisburg had become part of the County (and, after 1417, the Duchy) of Cleves. In 1445, an attack by Archbishop-Elector Dietrich II. von Moers of the Electorate of Cologne was successfully repelled.

=== Early modern period ===
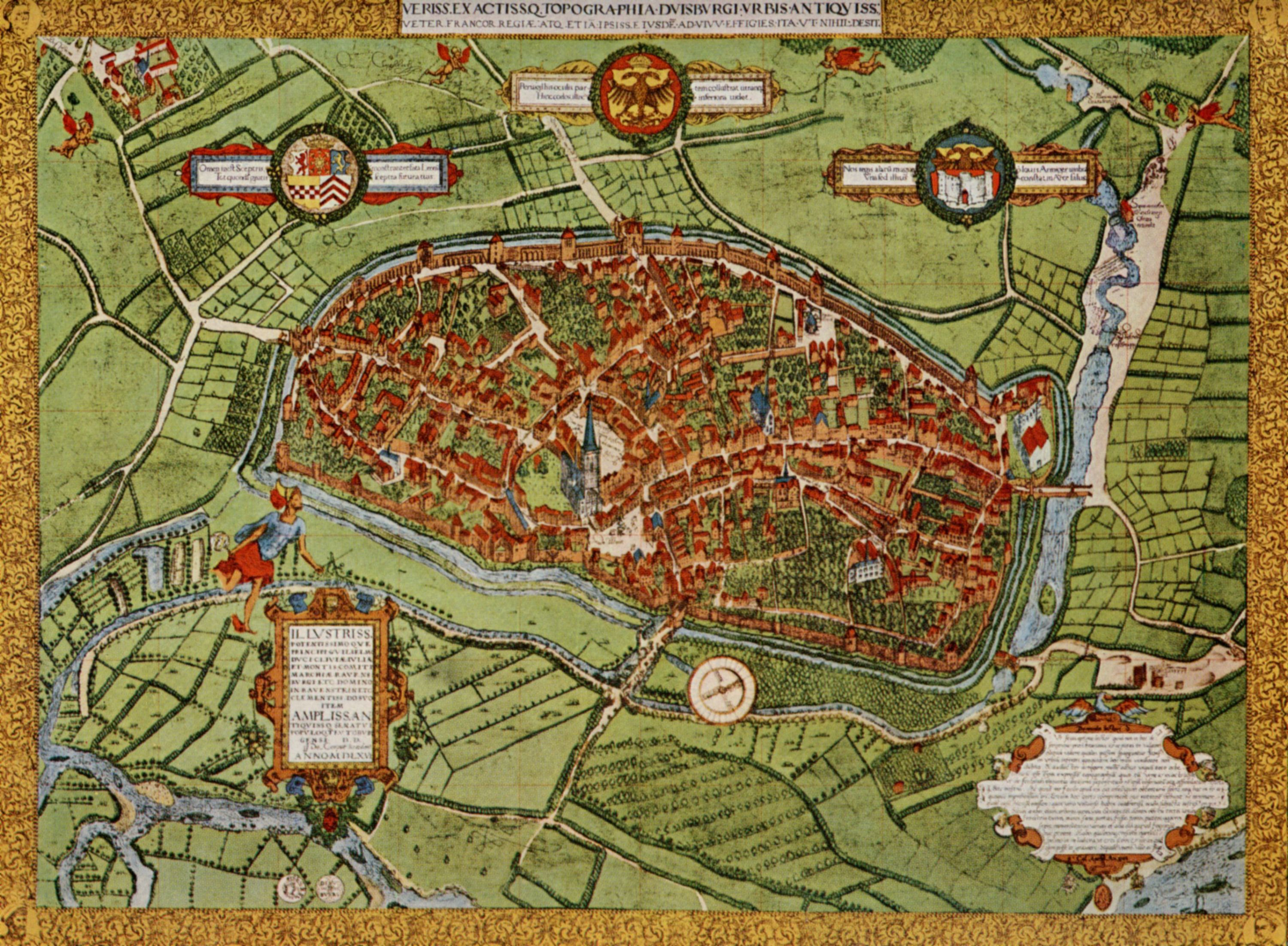
Corputius plan of Duisburg, completed in 1566

The Reformation spread to Duisburg only gradually around the mid-16th century. Refugees from the Netherlands and England contributed to the city's increasing Calvinist orientation. In 1566, Johannes Corputius completed his city map of Duisburg.

In September 1610, delegates meeting in Duisburg's Saviour's Church at the first General Synod of the Reformed congregations of Jülich-Cleves-Berg established a common church order based on the presbyterial-synodal principle, an institutional foundation that shaped the later Reformed Church on the Lower Rhine.

As a result of the Treaty of Xanten of 1614, the Duchy of Cleves passed to the House of Hohenzollern of Brandenburg. The city's reputation as "Educated Duisburg" ("Duisburgum Doctum") was established through the work of cartographer Gerardus Mercator and the founding of the University of Duisburg by Frederick William I of Brandenburg in 1655.

By 1666 the city, still within the Duchy of Cleves, became incorporated into Brandenburg-Prussia. In 1672, Frederick William joined the Franco-Dutch War as an ally of the Dutch Republic. A French military plan of Duisburg was prepared during the opening phase of the war. The plan showed the city's fortifications, roads, surrounding fields, waterways, and a geographical notice, and was preserved among French military correspondence for the campaign.

The city's commercial activity revived in 1674 with the establishment of a regular shipping route to the Netherlands. Trade, particularly in colonial goods, led to the development of a significant freight forwarding industry, as well as textile, tobacco, and sugar factories, which became the city's most important economic sectors.

=== Industrial revolution ===
The rise of tobacco and textile industries in the 18th century made Duisburg an industrial center. Big industrial companies such as iron and steel producing firms (Thyssen and Krupp) influenced the development of the city within the Prussian Rhine Province. Large housing areas near production sites were being built as workers and their families moved in.

In 1823, a district (Landkreis) of Duisburg was established, encompassing the neighboring cities of Essen and Mülheim an der Ruhr. The following year, in 1824, the construction of the sulfuric acid factory Fr. W. Curtius marked the beginning of the industrial era in Duisburg. With the construction of a canal connecting the city to the Rhine beginning in 1826, Rhine trade regained considerable importance. In 1828, Franz Haniel founded a dockyard for steamships, further contributing to the city's economic development. From 1844 onward, the connection to the Ruhr enabled Duisburg to participate in the growing coal trade. As the port expanded to handle timber, ore, and especially grain, Duisburg's port became the second-largest Rhine port after Ruhrort.

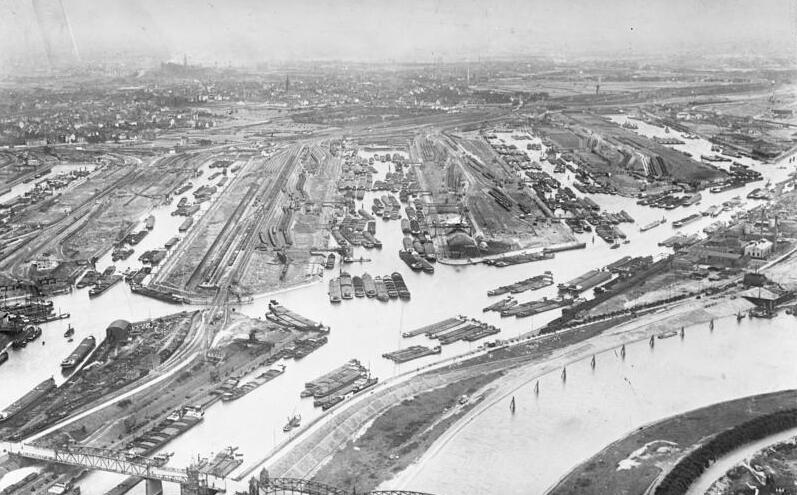
The Port of Duisburg in 1931

Duisburg's connection to the expanding railway network began in the 1840s, with the railway line to Düsseldorf completed in 1846, followed by the railway line via Dortmund to Minden in 1847. The city became an independent city borough in 1873. In 1904, it celebrated the birth of its 100,000th resident, Ernst R. Straube. Increasing competition between the ports of Duisburg and Ruhrort led, in 1905, to the merger of the ports, followed soon after by the unification of the cities of Duisburg, Ruhrort, and Meiderich.

On 8 March 1921, French infantry occupied Duisburg to secure war reparation payments incurred during World War I. In 1929, Duisburg was merged with the neighboring city of Hamborn to form the new city of Duisburg-Hamborn. This name was later shortened to Duisburg in 1935.

In November 1938, during the Kristallnacht pogroms organized by the Nazis, the city's synagogue was destroyed.

=== World War II ===
A major logistical center in the Ruhr and location of chemical, steel and iron industries, Duisburg was a primary target of Allied bombers, with industrial areas and residential blocks targeted by Allied incendiary bombs.

On the night of 12–13 June 1941, British bombers dropped a total of 445 tons of bombs in and around Duisburg. As part of the Battle of the Ruhr, another British raid of 577 bombers destroyed the old city between 12 and 13 May 1943 with 1,599 tons of bombs. During the bombing raids, 96,000 people were made homeless, and countless lives were lost.

In 1944, the city was again badly damaged as a total of 2,000 tons of bombs were dropped on 22 May. On 14 October, the tonnage was repeated with 2,018 tons when Halifax, Lancaster, and Mosquito bombers appeared over Duisburg as part of Operation Hurricane. This daylight raid was followed by a night attack; over 24 hours about 9,000 tons of HE and incendiaries had been dropped on Duisburg. Numerous similar attacks followed until the end of 1944.

The Allied ground advance into Germany reached Duisburg in April 1945. The US 17th Airborne Division, acting as regular infantry and not in a parachute role, met only scattered resistance in the vicinity and captured the city on 12 April 1945.

On 8 May 1945, the ADSEC Engineer Group A, led by Col. Helmer Swenholt, commanding officer of the 332nd Engineer General Service Regiment, constructed a railway bridge between Duisburg and Rheinhausen across the Rhine. It was 860 metres (2,820 ft) long, and constructed in six days, fifteen hours and twenty minutes, a record time. It was named the "Victory Bridge".

=== Federal Republic of Germany ===
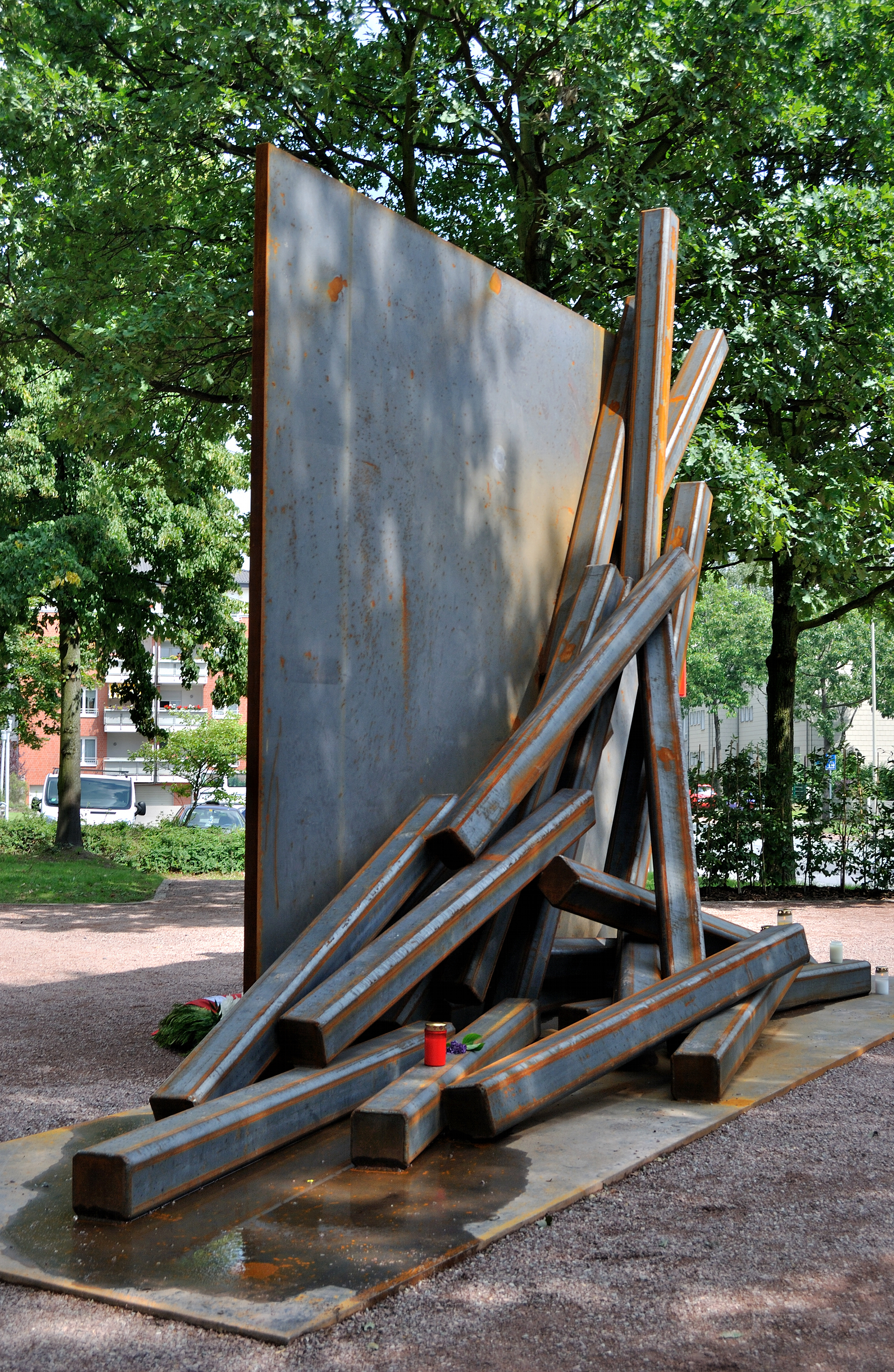
Memorial to the victims of the Love Parade disaster

A total of 299 bombing raids had almost completely destroyed the historic cityscape. 80% of all residential buildings had been destroyed or partly damaged. Almost the whole of the city had to be rebuilt, and most historic landmarks had been lost.

Beginning in the mid-1960s, the decline of Duisburg's steel and mining industry caused a significant loss of residents. While in 1975 approximately 590,000 people were living in Duisburg, the number had shrunk to 518,000 in 1985.

Duisburg celebrated its 1100th anniversary in 1983. The city's population recovered a little in the following years, up to 537,000 in 1992. It declined to 488,000 in 2011. On 19 July 2004, it was hit by a tornado. The municipal theater and parts of the city center were damaged. The city hosted the 7th World Games in 2005. In 2010, 21 people died because of a mass panic at the Love Parade; over 500 people were injured.

In March 2011, the inaugural freight train of the Chongqing–Xinjiang–Europe Railway arrived in Duisburg and since then the city has served as the railway's western terminus.

On 7 April 2025 15 schools were closed after an unknown far right extremist sent multiple bomb threats.

== Geography ==
Duisburg is in the Lowland Rhine area at the confluence of the Rhine and Ruhr and near the outskirts of the Bergisches Land. The city spreads along both sides of these rivers.

=== Adjacent cities and districts ===
Duisburg and surrounding cities and districts

The following cities and districts border Duisburg (clockwise starting from the north-east): Oberhausen, Mülheim an der Ruhr, Mettmann (district), Düsseldorf, Neuss (district), Krefeld, and Wesel (district).

=== Districts ===
Since 1 January 1975, Duisburg has been divided into seven districts or boroughs (Stadtbezirke) from north to south:

- Walsum
- Hamborn
- Meiderich/Beeck
- Homberg/Ruhrort/Baerl
- Duisburg-Mitte (city center)
- Rheinhausen
- Duisburg-Süd

=== Climate ===
Duisburg has an oceanic climate (Köppen: Cfb). On 25 July 2019, Duisburg recorded a temperature of 41.2 °C (106.2 °F), which is the 6th highest temperature to have ever been recorded in Germany.

Climate data for Duisburg (Jul 2021 - Jun 2026)
Month	Jan	Feb	Mar	Apr	May	Jun	Jul	Aug	Sep	Oct	Nov	Dec	Year
Record high °C (°F)	16.8 (62.2)	19.7 (67.5)	23.4 (74.1)	25.9 (78.6)	31.4 (88.5)	39.6 (103.3)	39.5 (103.1)	35.1 (95.2)	32.2 (90.0)	25.4 (77.7)	18.2 (64.8)	17.5 (63.5)	39.6 (103.3)
Mean daily maximum °C (°F)	6.4 (43.5)	9.6 (49.3)	13.5 (56.3)	16.0 (60.8)	21.1 (70.0)	24.9 (76.8)	25.0 (77.0)	25.2 (77.4)	21.9 (71.4)	16.8 (62.2)	10.6 (51.1)	7.7 (45.9)	16.6 (61.8)
Daily mean °C (°F)	4.2 (39.6)	6.5 (43.7)	8.7 (47.7)	10.9 (51.6)	15.4 (59.7)	19.3 (66.7)	19.4 (66.9)	19.6 (67.3)	16.8 (62.2)	13.0 (55.4)	7.8 (46.0)	5.6 (42.1)	12.3 (54.1)
Mean daily minimum °C (°F)	1.9 (35.4)	3.6 (38.5)	3.9 (39.0)	5.8 (42.4)	9.5 (49.1)	13.3 (55.9)	14.1 (57.4)	14.2 (57.6)	12.1 (53.8)	9.5 (49.1)	5.0 (41.0)	3.2 (37.8)	8.0 (46.4)
Record low °C (°F)	−6.8 (19.8)	−4.5 (23.9)	−2.7 (27.1)	−2.9 (26.8)	2.0 (35.6)	4.9 (40.8)	8.5 (47.3)	6.7 (44.1)	4.6 (40.3)	1.7 (35.1)	−2.9 (26.8)	−7.6 (18.3)	−7.6 (18.3)
Average rainfall mm (inches)	73 (2.9)	58 (2.3)	49 (1.9)	56 (2.2)	80 (3.1)	70 (2.8)	83 (3.3)	72 (2.8)	82 (3.2)	72 (2.8)	67 (2.6)	70 (2.8)	832 (32.7)
Source: Wetterdienst.de

Climate data for Duisburg
Month	Jan	Feb	Mar	Apr	May	Jun	Jul	Aug	Sep	Oct	Nov	Dec	Year
Mean daily maximum °C (°F)	5.5 (41.9)	7.0 (44.6)	10.4 (50.7)	14.8 (58.6)	18.5 (65.3)	22.0 (71.6)	23.3 (73.9)	23.1 (73.6)	19.6 (67.3)	15.0 (59.0)	9.7 (49.5)	6.4 (43.5)	14.6 (58.3)
Daily mean °C (°F)	3.5 (38.3)	4.3 (39.7)	6.7 (44.1)	10.4 (50.7)	14.2 (57.6)	17.6 (63.7)	19.0 (66.2)	18.7 (65.7)	15.4 (59.7)	11.6 (52.9)	7.4 (45.3)	4.4 (39.9)	11.1 (52.0)
Mean daily minimum °C (°F)	1.4 (34.5)	1.8 (35.2)	3.3 (37.9)	5.9 (42.6)	9.7 (49.5)	13.0 (55.4)	14.8 (58.6)	14.6 (58.3)	11.6 (52.9)	8.8 (47.8)	5.1 (41.2)	2.5 (36.5)	7.7 (45.9)
Average rainfall mm (inches)	72.2 (2.84)	66.8 (2.63)	64.3 (2.53)	52.9 (2.08)	72.1 (2.84)	72.6 (2.86)	94.4 (3.72)	88.3 (3.48)	66.5 (2.62)	76.5 (3.01)	74.3 (2.93)	75.9 (2.99)	876.8 (34.53)
Average snowfall mm (inches)	7.1 (0.28)	7.2 (0.28)	3.2 (0.13)	0.7 (0.03)	0.0 (0.0)	0.0 (0.0)	0.0 (0.0)	0.0 (0.0)	0.0 (0.0)	0.0 (0.0)	1.9 (0.07)	8.2 (0.32)	28.3 (1.11)
Average relative humidity (%)	85.8	81.6	76.1	70.0	70.9	70.8	72.4	75.1	79.2	83.4	86.9	87.5	78.3
Mean monthly sunshine hours	24.0	67.8	135.6	206.8	234.0	247.2	249.6	226.2	163.4	94.7	35.6	12.6	1,697.5
Source: Weather.Directory

== Politics ==
=== Mayor ===
Results of the second round of the 2025 mayoral election

The current mayor of Duisburg is Sören Link of the Social Democratic Party (SPD), who was elected in 2012 and re-elected in 2017 and 2025.

The most recent mayoral election was held on 14 September 2025 with a runoff election being held on 28 September, and the results were as follows:

Candidate	Party	First round		Second round	
Candidate	Party	Votes	%	Votes	%
Sören Link	Social Democratic Party	77,637	46.0	121,272	78.6
Carsten Groß	Alternative for Germany	33,282	19.7	33,079	21.4
Gerhard Meyer	Christian Democratic Union	24,558	14.5		
Sebastian Ritter	The Greens	10,684	6.3		
Barbara Laakmann	The Left	7,761	4.6		
Ayhan Yildirim	Duisburg Alternative List-We Shape Duisburg	4,445	2.6		
Oliver Beltermann	Young Duisburg	3,407	2.0		
Erkan Kocalar	Sahra Wagenknecht Alliance	3,040	1.8		
Oliver Alefs	Free Democratic Party	1,527	0.9		
Dagmar Schink	Die PARTEI	1,429	0.9		
Britta Söntgerath	Volt Germany	1.100	0.7		
Valid votes		168,870	99.4		
Invalid votes		1,077	0.6		
Total		169,947	100.0		
Electorate/voter turnout		351.441	48.4		
Source: City of Duisburg

=== City council ===
Results of the 2025 city council election

The Duisburg city council (Duisburger Stadtrat) governs the city alongside the mayor. The most recent city council election was held on 14 September 2025, and the results were as follows:

Party	Votes	%	±	Seats	±
Social Democratic Party (SPD)	54,925	32.6	▲2.1	34	▲2
Alternative for Germany (AfD)	35,671	21.2	▲11.9	22	▲12
Christian Democratic Union (CDU)	29,284	17.4	▼4.1	18	▼4
Alliance 90/The Greens (Grüne)	15,348	9.1	▼8.6	10	▼9
The Left (Die Linke)	10,099	6.0	▲0.5	6	±0
Young Duisburg (JUDU)	5,684	3.4	▲0.4	4	▲1
Sahra Wagenknecht Alliance (BSW)	3,562	2.1	New	2	New
Duisburg Alternative List-We Shape Duisburg (DAL-WGD)	3,297	2.0	New	2	New
Human Environment Animal Protection (Tierschutz)	3,191	1.9	±0	2	±0
Free Democratic Party (FDP)	2,521	1.5	▼1.6	2	▼1
Active Citizens' Initiative (ABI)	1,643	1.0	New	1	New
Social, Just, Independent (SGU)	1,553	0.9	▼0.1	1	±0
Volt Germany (Volt)	788	0.5	New	0	New
Die PARTEI (PARTEI)	642	0.4	▼0.8	0	▼1
Independent Future Marxloh	282	0.2	New	0	New
Pirate Party Germany (PIRATEN)	30	New	0	New	
Valid votes	168,520	99.2			
Invalid votes	1,334	0.8			
Total	169,854	100.0		104	▲2
Electorate/voter turnout	351,441	48.3	▲9.2		
Source: City of Duisburg

=== State parliament ===
In the Landtag of North Rhine-Westphalia, Duisburg is divided between three constituencies: 61 Duisburg I (containing Süd district and most of Mitte), 62 Duisburg II (Walsum, Rheinhausen, and most of Homberg/Ruhrort/Baerl), and 63 Duisburg III (Hamborn, Meiderich/Beeck, and parts of Mitte and Homberg/Ruhrort/Baerl). After the 2022 North Rhine-Westphalia state election, all three constituencies were held by the SPD. Duisburg I was represented by Sarah Philipp, Duisburg II by Rainer Bischoff, and Duisburg III by Frank Börner.

=== Federal parliament ===
In the Bundestag, Duisburg is divided between two constituencies: 115 Duisburg I (Rheinhausen, Süd, and Mitte) and 116 Duisburg II (Walsum, Hamborn, Meidereich/Beeck, Homberg/Ruhrort/Baerl). In the 21st Bundestag, both are held by the SPD. Duisburg I is represented by Federal Minister of Labour and Social Affairs Bärbel Bas, and Duisburg II by Mahmut Özdemir.

== Demographics ==
With a population of 500,810 within the city boundaries (31 December 2025), Düsseldorf is Germany's fifteenth largest city.

Historical population

Year	Pop.	±% p.a.
1714	2,983	—
1810	5,195	+0.58%
1871	30,533	+2.95%
1900	92,729	+3.90%
1910	229,483	+9.48%
1919	244,302	+0.70%
1925	272,252	+1.82%
1933	440,419	+6.20%
1939	434,646	−0.22%
1950	410,783	−0.51%
1961	504,975	+1.89%
1965	655,646	+6.75%

Year	Pop.	±% p.a.
1970	620,561	−1.09%
1975	591,639	−0.95%
1980	558,094	−1.16%
1985	518,277	−1.47%
1990	535,447	+0.65%
1995	535,250	−0.01%
2000	514,915	−0.77%
2005	501,564	−0.52%
2010	489,559	−0.48%
2015	491,231	+0.07%
2020	495,885	+0.19%
2025	500,810	+0.20%

Population size may be affected by changes in administrative divisions. Source: Landesdatabank Nordrhein-Westfalen (1965-2025)

Duisburg has one of the highest proportions of Muslims in Germany, with the city's Muslim population at approximately 15%, or 71,000 residents, as of 2011.

Population structure of non-German residents:

Rank	Nationality	Population (31 December 2022)
1	Turkey	33,768
2	Bulgaria	12,143
3	Syria	9,423
4	Ukraine	9,068
5	Romania	8,853
6	Poland	5,423
7	Italy	3,805
8	Serbia	2,488
9	Greece	2,381
10	Croatia	2,044
11	Bosnia and Herzegovina	1,944
12	North Macedonia	1,489
13	Kosovo	1,445
14	Netherlands	1,427
15	Spain	1,272
16	Morocco	1,249
17	Malaysia	1,204

=== Turkish community ===
Duisburg is home to 85,000 people of Turkish origin. Other estimates suggest that the Turkish population is as large as 100,000. The new Merkez Mosque, one of the largest Muslim places of worship in Western Europe, was built with help by the way of contribution of 3.2 million euro from the EU and the state of North Rhine-Westphalia. Asiye Nur Fettahoğlu, a Turkish-German actress, was born in Duisburg on 12 November 1980.

== Culture ==
Duisburg hosts a comprehensive range of cultural facilities and events. A highlight is the annual "Duisburger Akzente", a festival focusing on modern social, political and cultural topics.

Alongside Düsseldorf, Duisburg is one of the seats of the Deutsche Oper am Rhein, one of the major opera houses in Germany. The Duisburg Philharmonic Orchestra is one of Germany's orchestras with an international reputation.

Due to its history as a harbour city and a trade and industrial center, Duisburg offers a variety of architectural places of interest, such as the German Inland Waterways Museum. Buildings vary from old churches such as Hamborn Abbey, which was built in 900, to modern age buildings such as Micro-Electronic-Centrum in Duisburg-Neudorf, built in 1995. Another subject of interest is the Landschaftspark Duisburg-Nord, an abandoned industrial complex open to the public and an Anchor Point of ERIH, The European Route of Industrial Heritage. The city center contains the Wilhelm Lehmbruck Museum, the municipal theatre and the shopping street known as the "fountain mile".

The city also contains two botanical gardens, the Botanischer Garten Duisburg-Hamborn and the Botanischer Garten Kaiserberg, as well as a number of municipal parks.

On 24 July 2010, 21 people were killed and hundreds injured in the city during the Love Parade disaster. The Love Parade was an electronic dance music festival and technoparade.

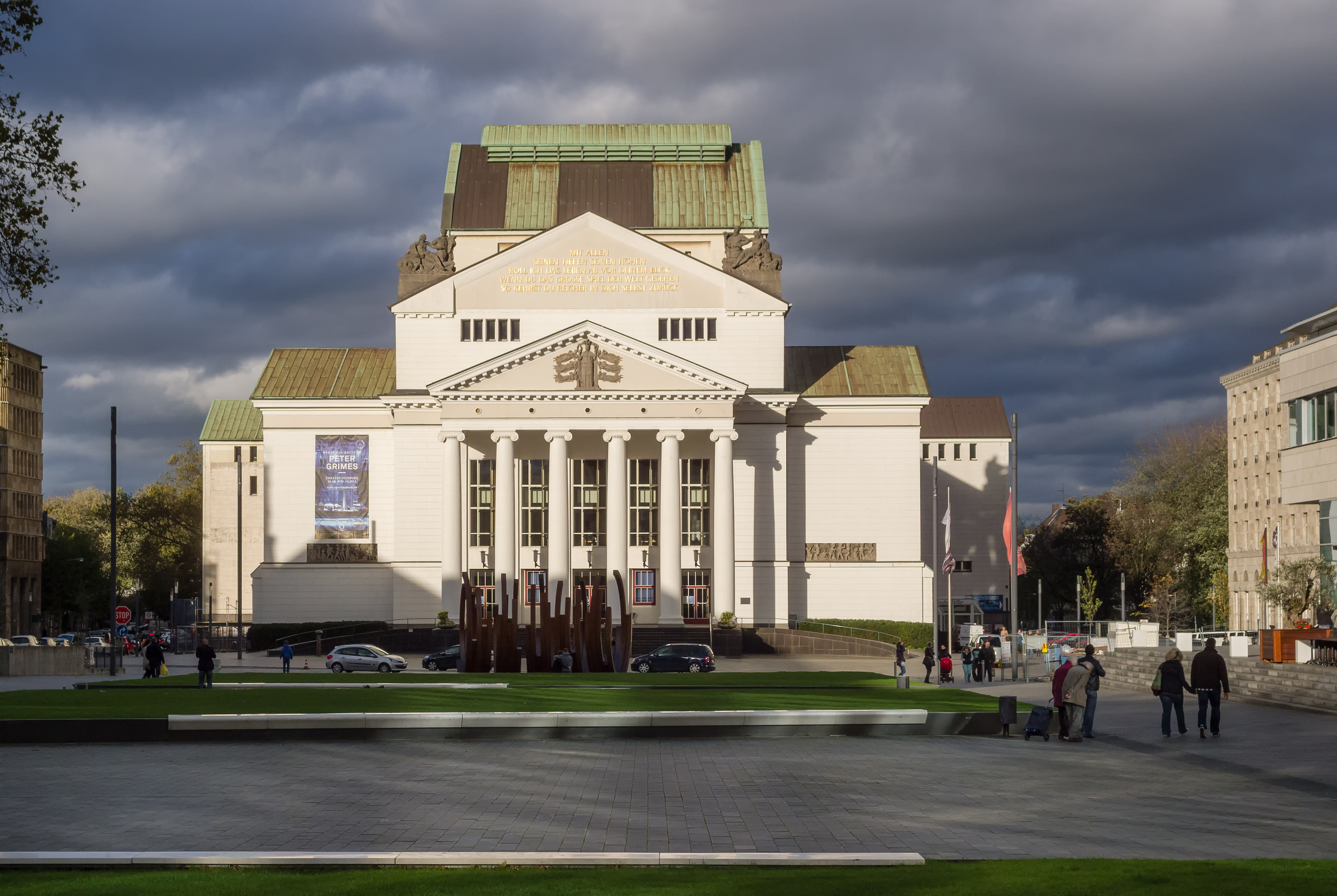
Theater Duisburg, venue of the Duisburg Philharmonic

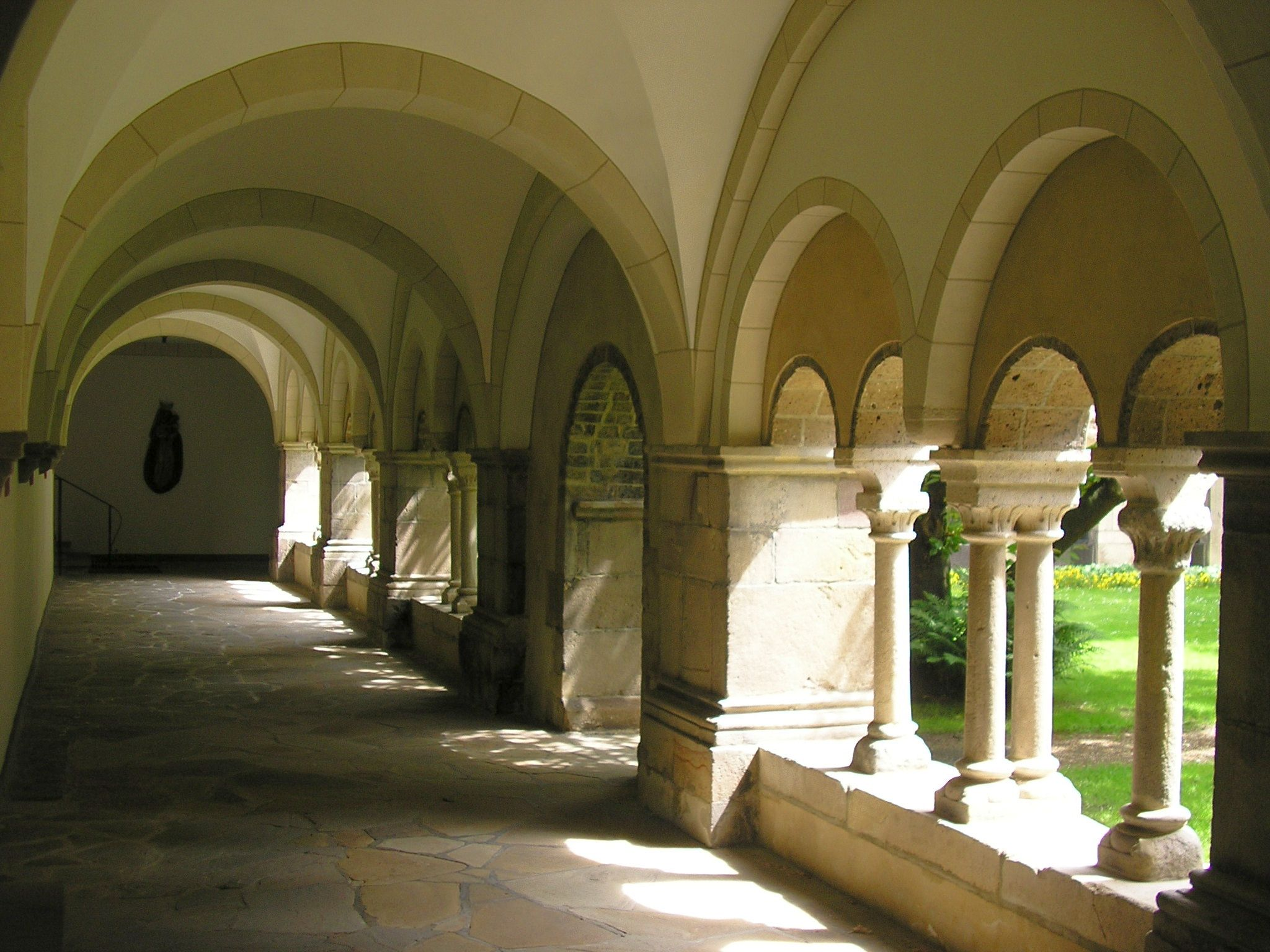
Hamborn Abbey

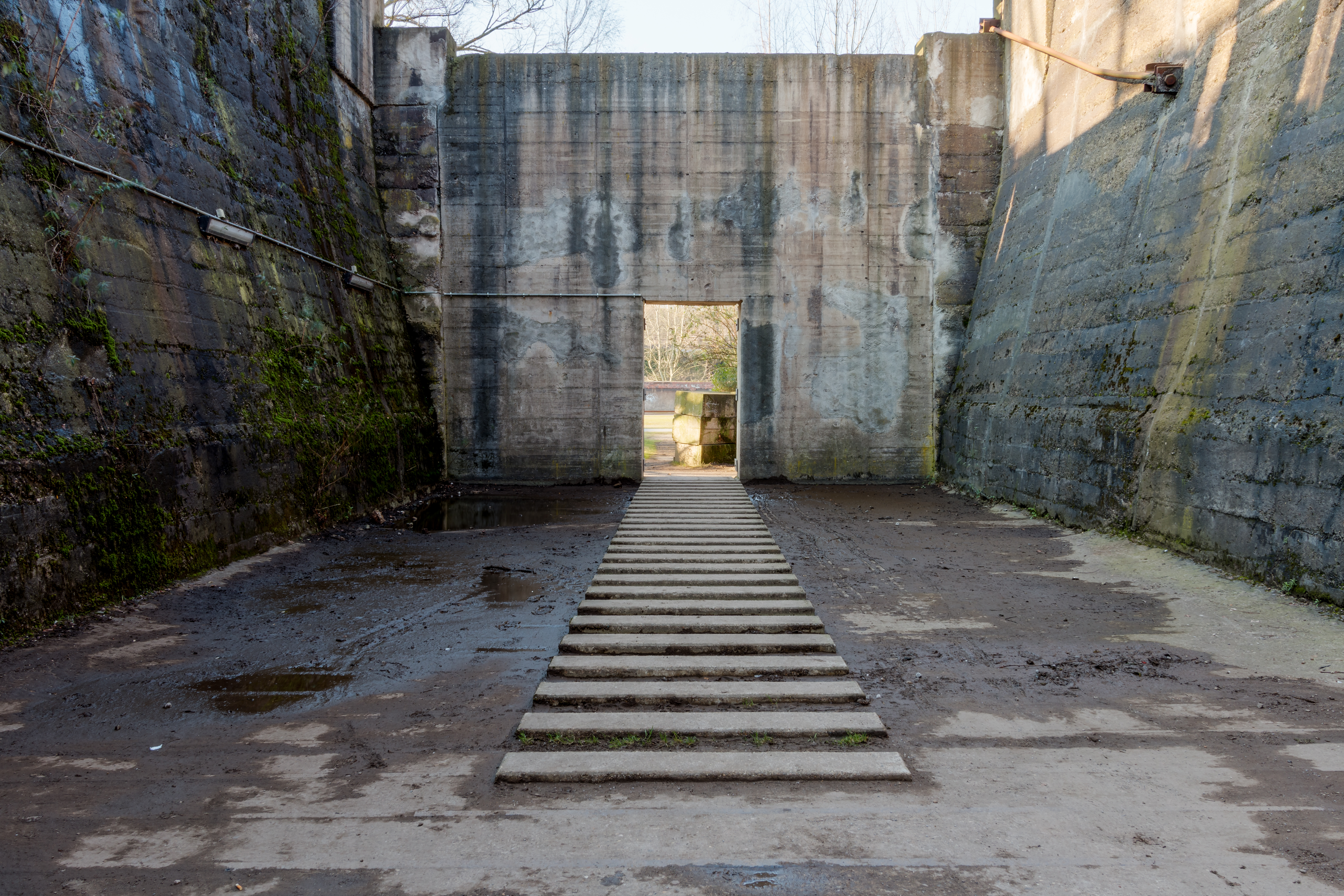
Landschaftspark Duisburg-Nord ("Landscape Park North"), on a former industrial estate

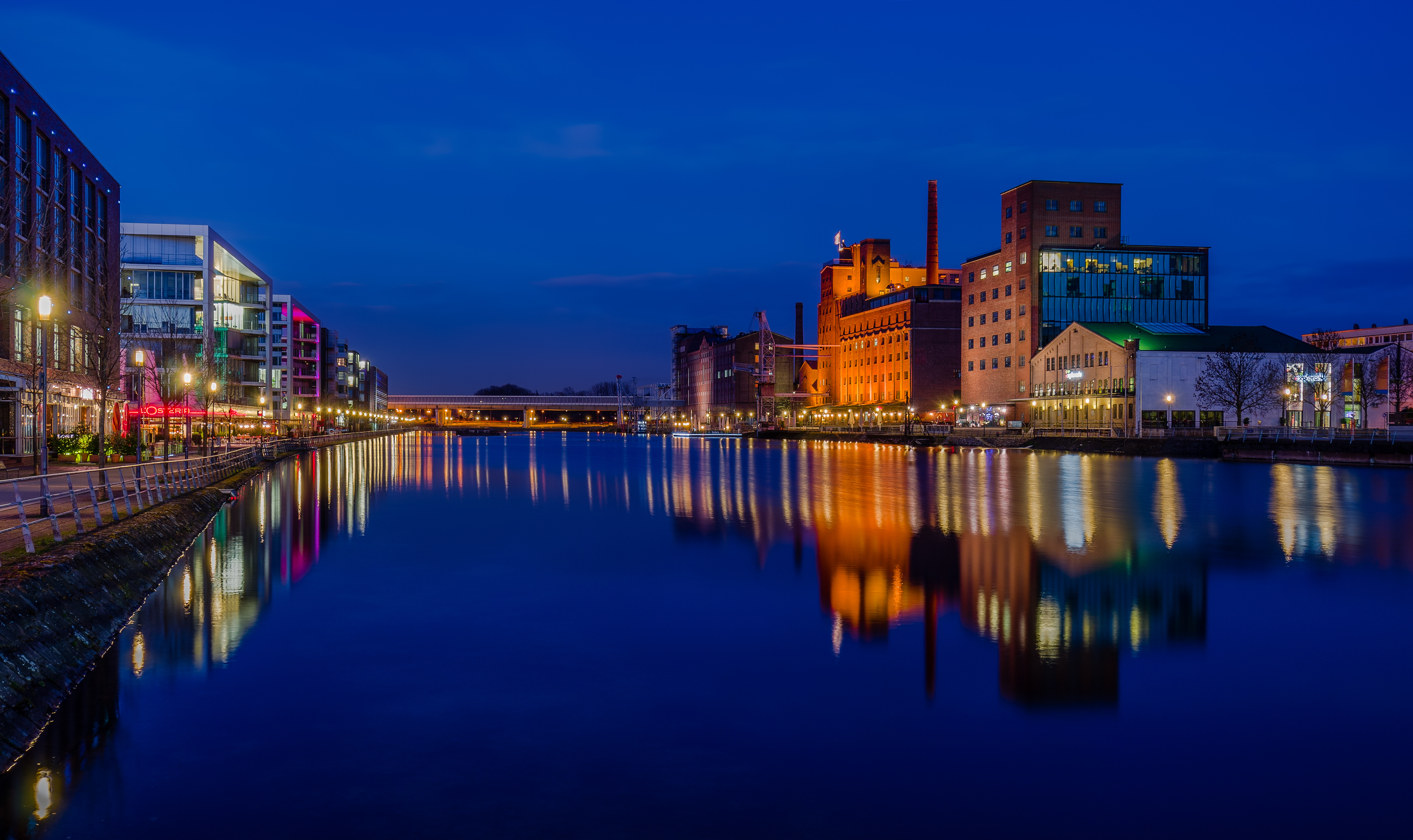
Old inner harbour

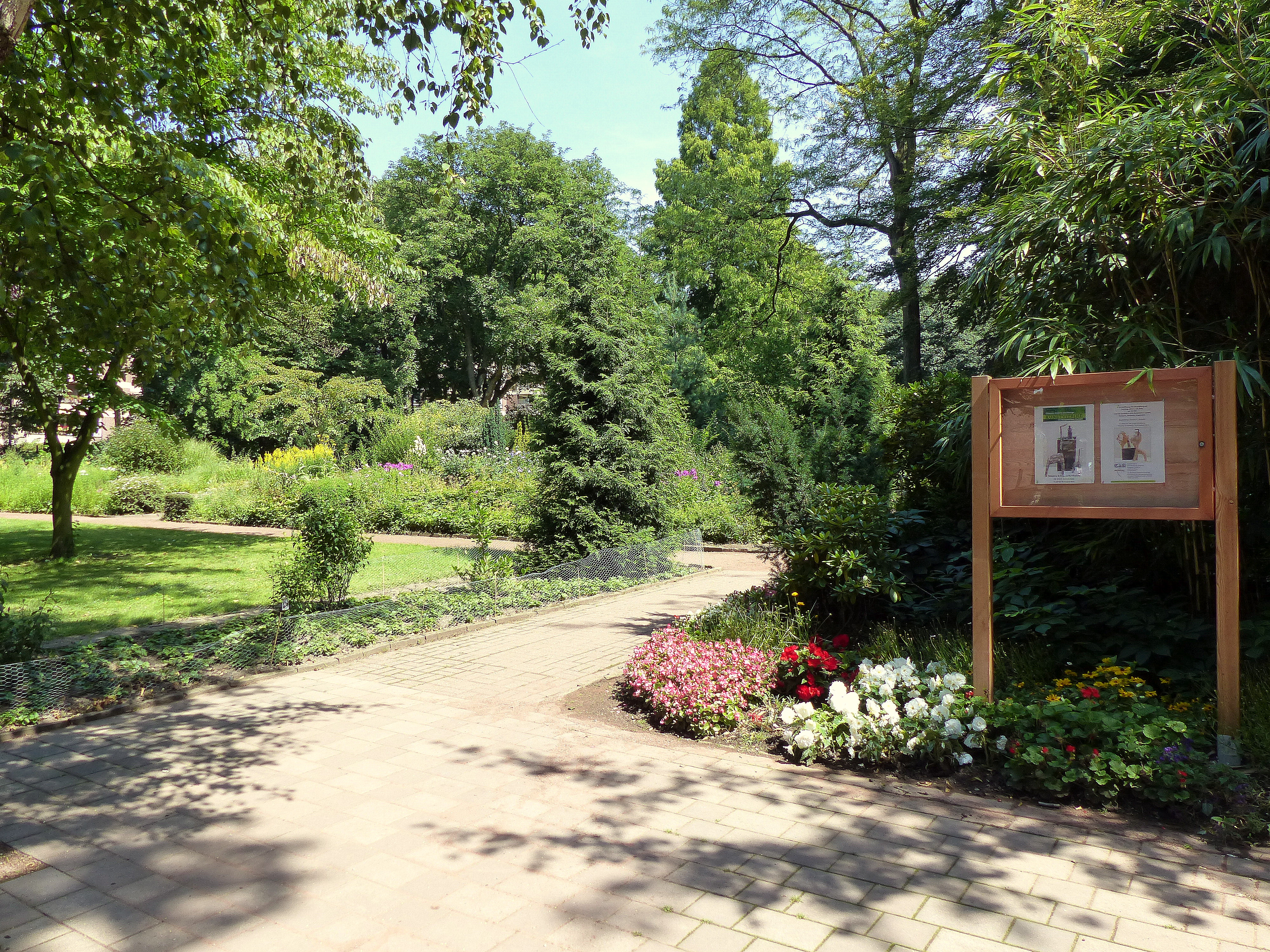
Botanischer Garten Kaiserberg

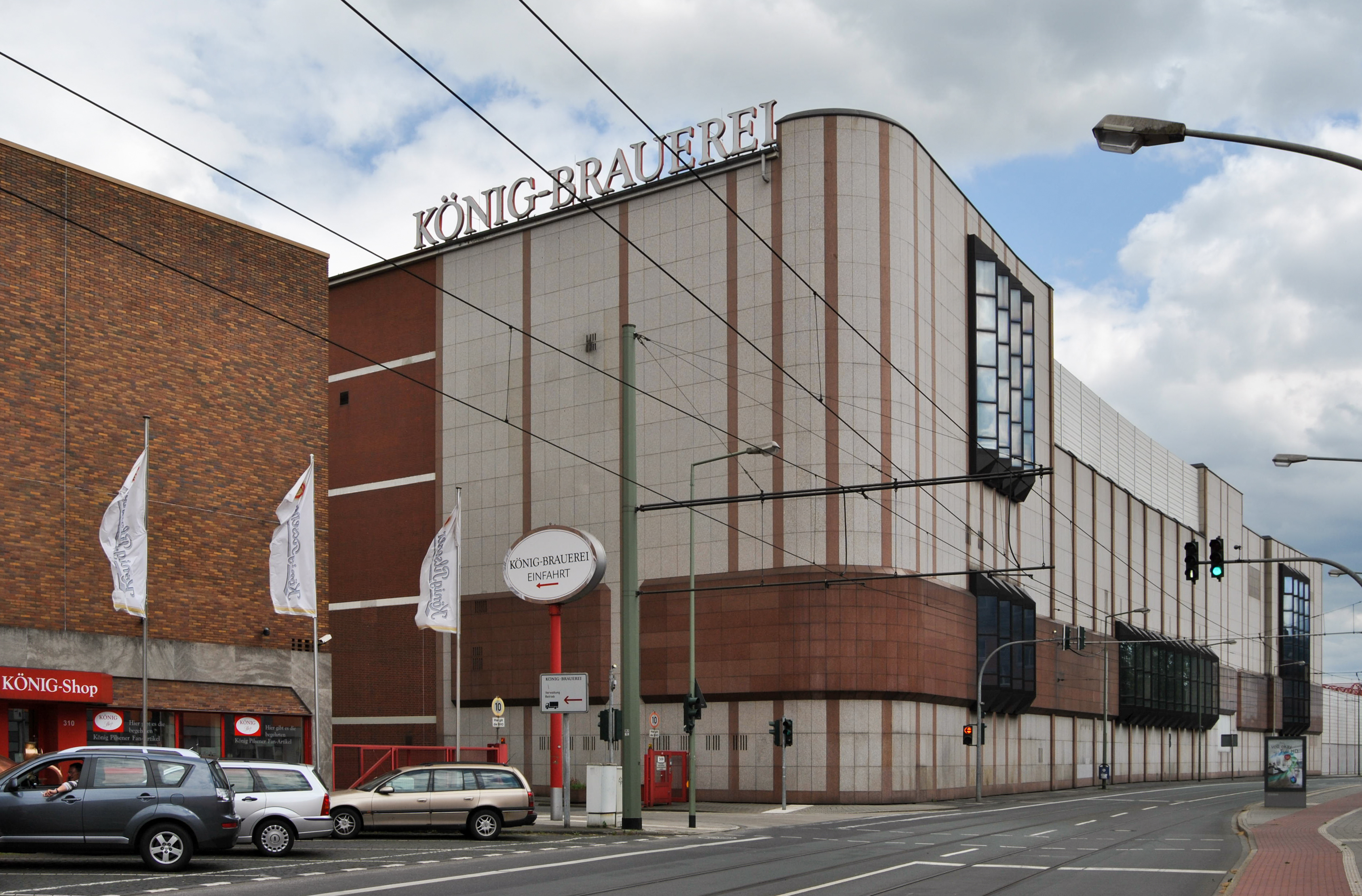
König Brewery

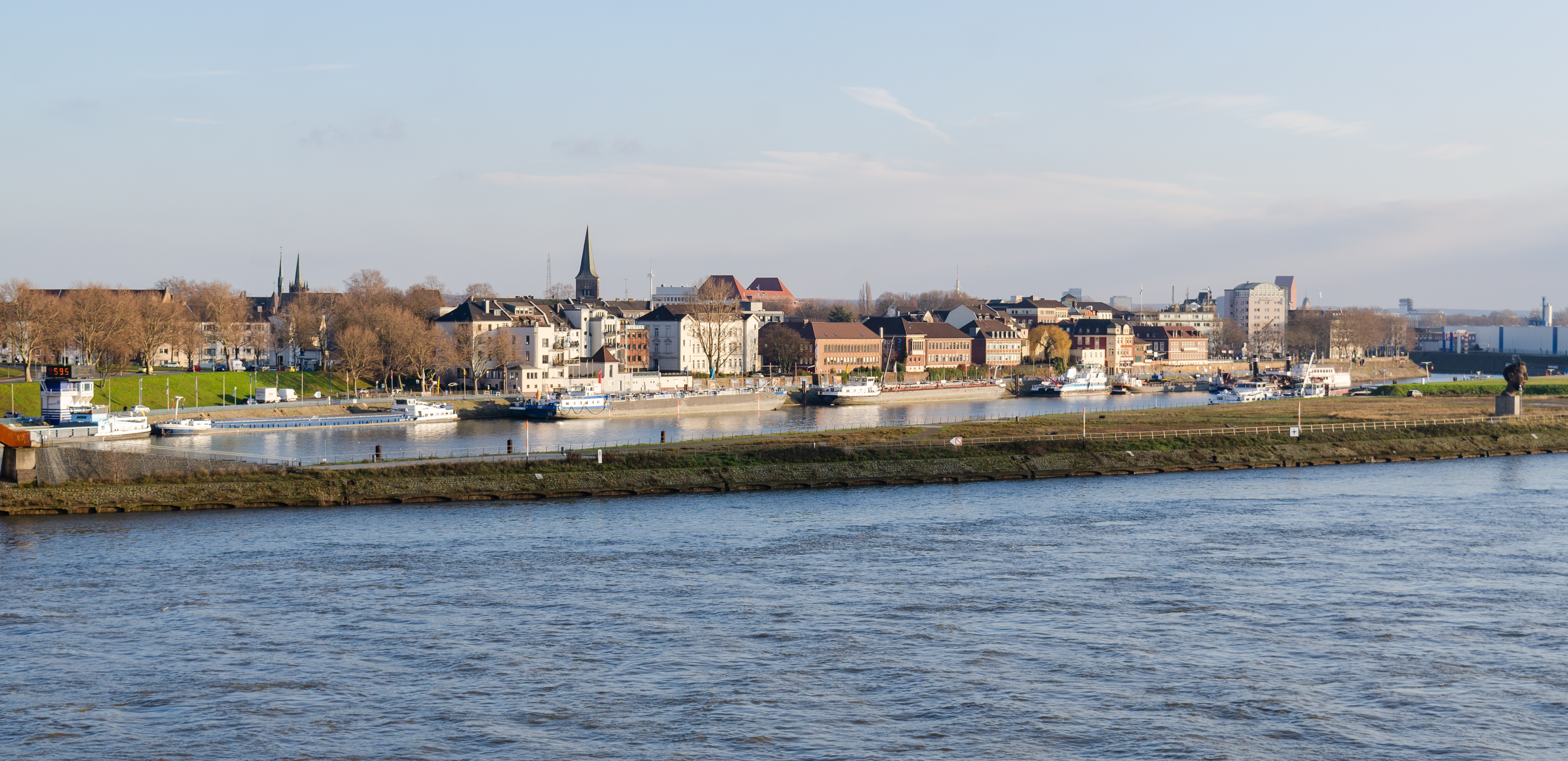
Ruhrort

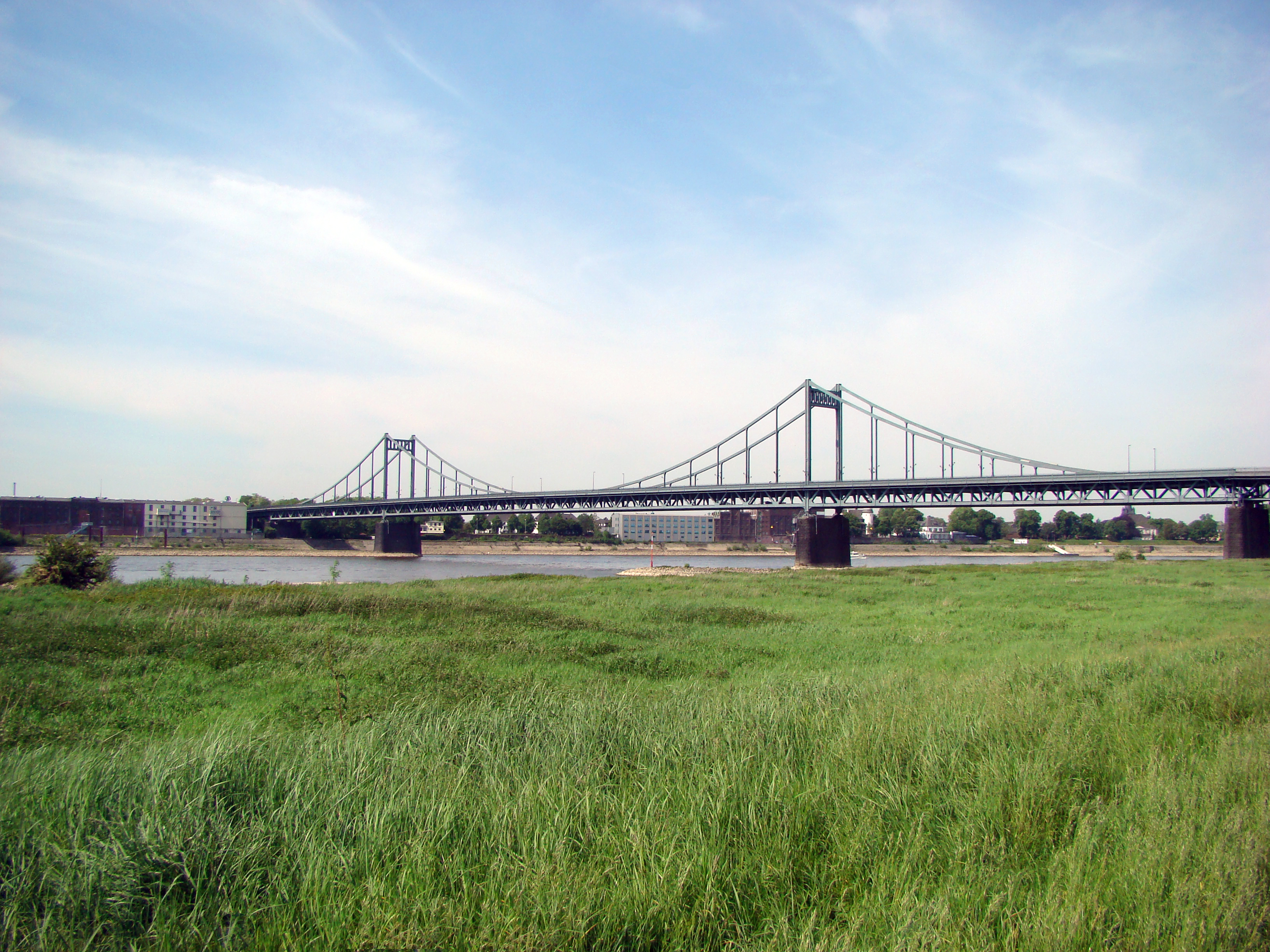
Krefeld-Uerdingen Bridge

=== Local dialect ===
As with the Venlo dialect, the city's local dialect, the Düsberjesch, called Duisburger Platt in German, is a tonal dialect of the Kleverlandish heavily influenced historically by the Bergish dialects of the Limburgish language spoken in its southern boroughs.

== Economy ==
=== Duisburg Port ===
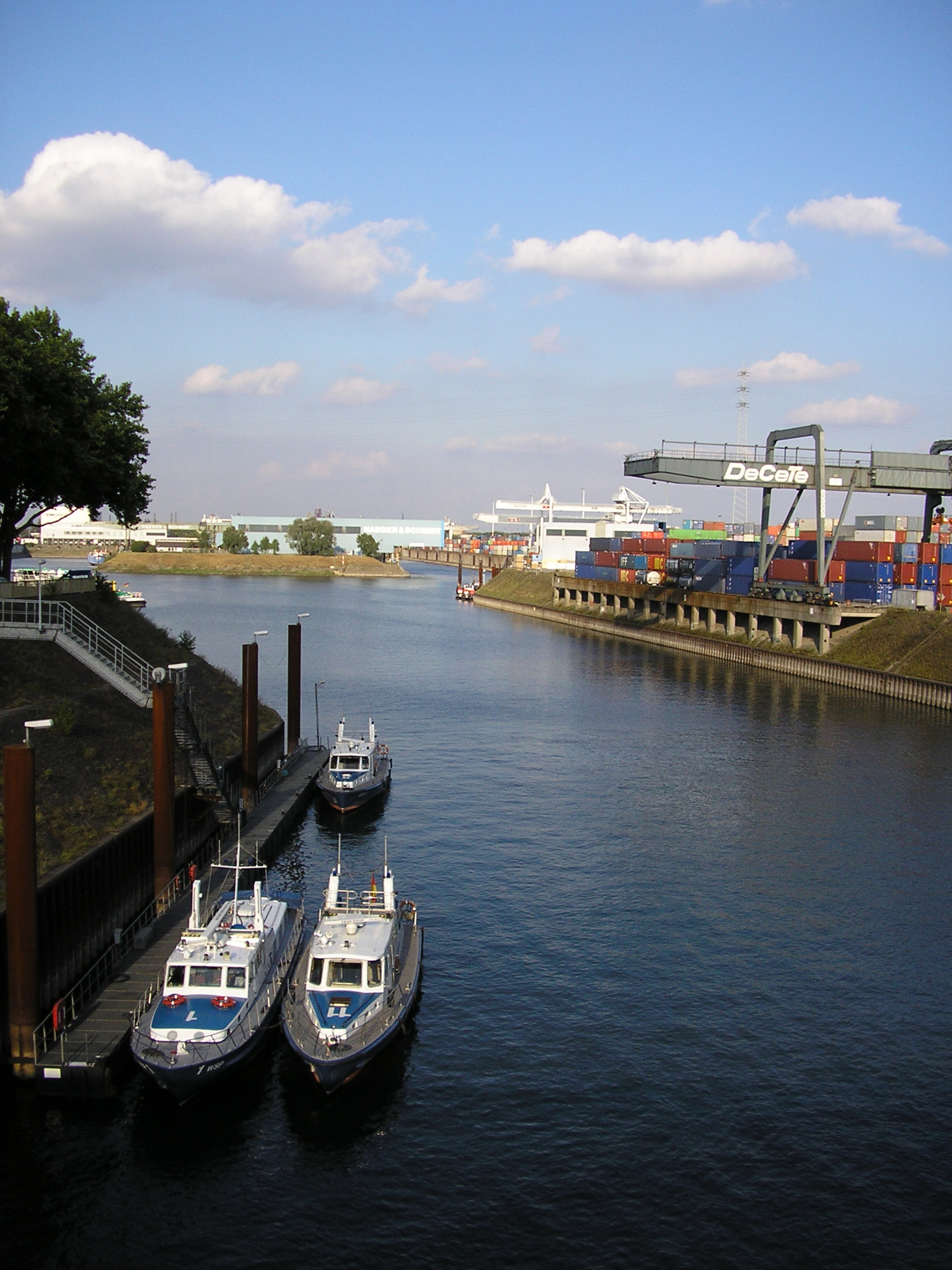
Port of Duisburg

The Port of Duisburg is Europe's largest inland port. It is officially regarded as a seaport because seagoing river vessels go to ports in Europe, Africa and the Middle East. Numerous docks are mostly located at the mouth of the Ruhr where it joins the Rhine.

The port processes over 4 million containers annually. Each year more than 40 million tonnes of various goods are handled with more than 20,000 ships calling at the port. The public harbour facilities stretch across an area of 7.4 square kilometres (2.9 sq mi). There are 21 docks covering an area of 1.8 km^{2} (0.7 sq mi) and 40 kilometres (25 miles) of wharf. The area of the Logport Logistic Center Duisburg stretches across an area of 2.65 km^{2} (1.02 sq mi). With 2.5 million TEU it is also the largest inland container port, based on 2011 figures. A number of companies run their own private docks and 114 million tonnes of goods yearly (2010) are handled in Duisburg in total.

=== Role in Sino–European Trade ===
Duisburg serves as a key European hub in China's Belt and Road Initiative, anchored by the Port of Duisburg, which functions as the primary terminus for China-Europe freight rail services. Direct rail services connect the port to more than 20 cities across China. The Chongqing–Xinjiang–Europe railway, a direct rail link to Chongqing established in 2011, was among the first of these connections and helped position Duisburg as a principal entry point for Sino-European trade and Chinese commercial operations on the continent.

=== Media ===
There are several newspapers reporting on local events and politics, including the Westdeutsche Allgemeine Zeitung (WAZ), the Neue Ruhr Zeitung (NRZ) and the Rheinische Post (RP). The local radio station "Radio Duisburg" was the first local radio broadcaster in the German state of North Rhine-Westphalia. It started broadcasting in 1990. There is a local television station ("STUDIO 47"), which was the first local station to broadcast in North Rhine-Westphalia. It started broadcasting in 2006. In its Duisburg studios the WDR produces a local programme for the city of Duisburg and the Lower Rhine region north of Düsseldorf. WDR is part of the German television and radio network ARD.

== Transport ==
=== Roads ===
Duisburg is served by several autobahns, with 3 east–west routes and 2 north–south routes. A3 forms a bypass east of the city and mostly serves through traffic. A59 runs parallel to A3 and serves the city from north to south with 14 interchanges, much more than most other cities in the Ruhr area. The A40 and A42 are two east–west routes that serve central and northern Duisburg. Autobahn A40 also serves major through traffic from the Netherlands to Berlin and points east. A short spur, A524 serves southern Duisburg. Most Autobahns have six lanes or are upgraded to six lanes (A59).

Apart from the autobahns, no Bundesstraßen serve the city directly. B8 runs through the city, but uses A59's alignment. B288 runs in the extreme south of the city, and serves traffic to and from Krefeld. Several bridges span the Rhine, most prominently the A40 and A42 bridges, but also the L287 suspension bridge and the L237 arch bridge, a three-lane bridge with 2 lanes per peak direction with dynamic lane usage.

=== Public transport ===
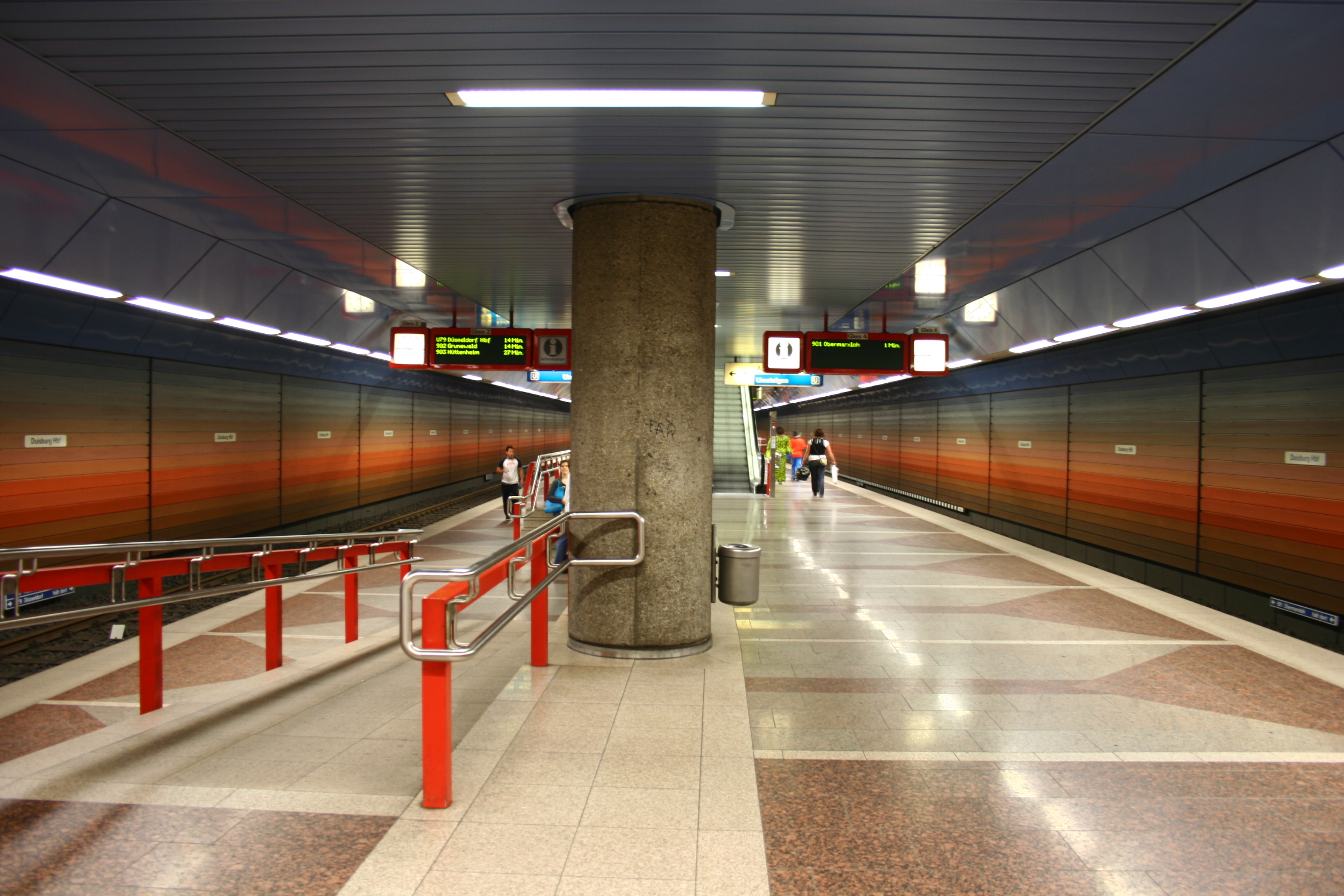
Underground station of Duisburg Stadtbahn (part of VRR) in 2009

Duisburg Hauptbahnhof is served by the InterCityExpress and InterCity long-distance network of the Deutsche Bahn, in addition line S1 of the S-Bahn line connects Duisburg with other cities of the Rhine-Ruhr area.

The Duisburg Stadtbahn, the Duisburg tramway network, and a bus system, all operated by the Duisburger Verkehrsgesellschaft, provide local services. Stadtbahn line U79, the so-called "D-Bahn" ("D-Line"), connects to the neighbouring city of Düsseldorf and is operated jointly with the Rheinbahn of Düsseldorf. All S-Bahn, Stadtbahn, and bus lines operate under the umbrella of the Verkehrsverbund Rhein-Ruhr.

=== Airport ===
Duisburg is served by Düsseldorf Airport, located approximately 15 kilometers from the city center and accessible in 10–15 minutes by both car and train. Other significant airports serving the region include Weeze Airport, Dortmund Airport, and Cologne/Bonn Airport, situated 55, 65, and 75 kilometers from downtown Duisburg, respectively. All of these airports can be reached within one hour by car or train.

== Sport ==
Club	Sport	League	Venue
MSV Duisburg	Football	3. Liga	MSV-Arena
Rhein Fire	American football	European League of Football (ELF)	MSV-Arena
Füchse Duisburg	Ice hockey	Oberliga (3rd District League)	PreZero Rheinlandhalle
MSV-Duisburg	Women's football	Women's Bundesliga	MSV-Arena
Duisburg Dockers	Baseball, American football	Landesliga II (2nd District League)	Schwelgernstadion
Amateur SC Duisburg	Water polo	Deutsche Wasserball-Liga (1st Water Polo League)	Schwimmstadion and club pool
Club Raffelberg	Hockey	Regionalliga West (3rd Hockey League)	Kalkweg

Duisburg hosts a variety of sports activities and events, with football being the most prominent among residents. The local football club, MSV Duisburg, plays a central role in the city's sporting culture. MSV Duisburg play their home matches at the MSV-Arena, a modern stadium accommodating football, American football and other sporting events. In the 2025–26 season, MSV Duisburg recorded an average home attendance of 22,949 across 17 home matches, the third-highest in the 3. Liga.

Duisburg served as one of the host cities for the 2005 World Games during the summer of 2005. During the 2006 FIFA World Cup, the city was used as the training base for the Portuguese national team, while the Italian national team, which went on to win the tournament, was accommodated there.

The city is known for the Rhein-Ruhr-Marathon, as well as for its rowing and canoeing regattas, which regularly include international championships. Other popular sports in Duisburg include ice hockey, basketball, American football, water polo, and field hockey.

== Notable people ==
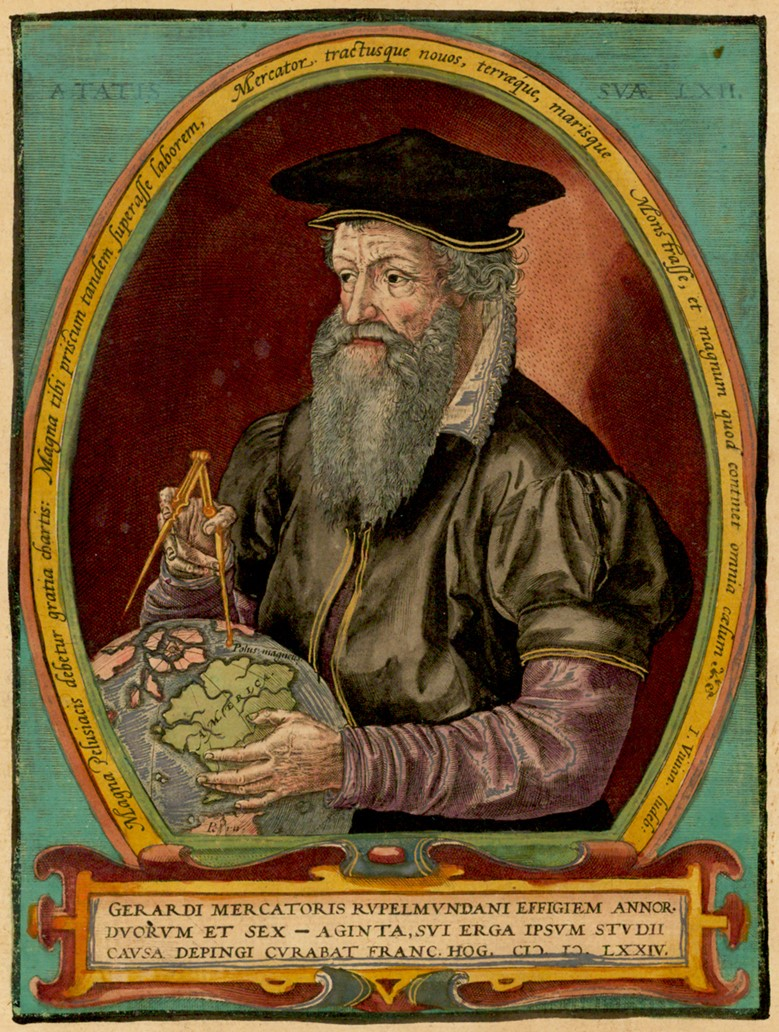
Gerardus Mercator, 1574

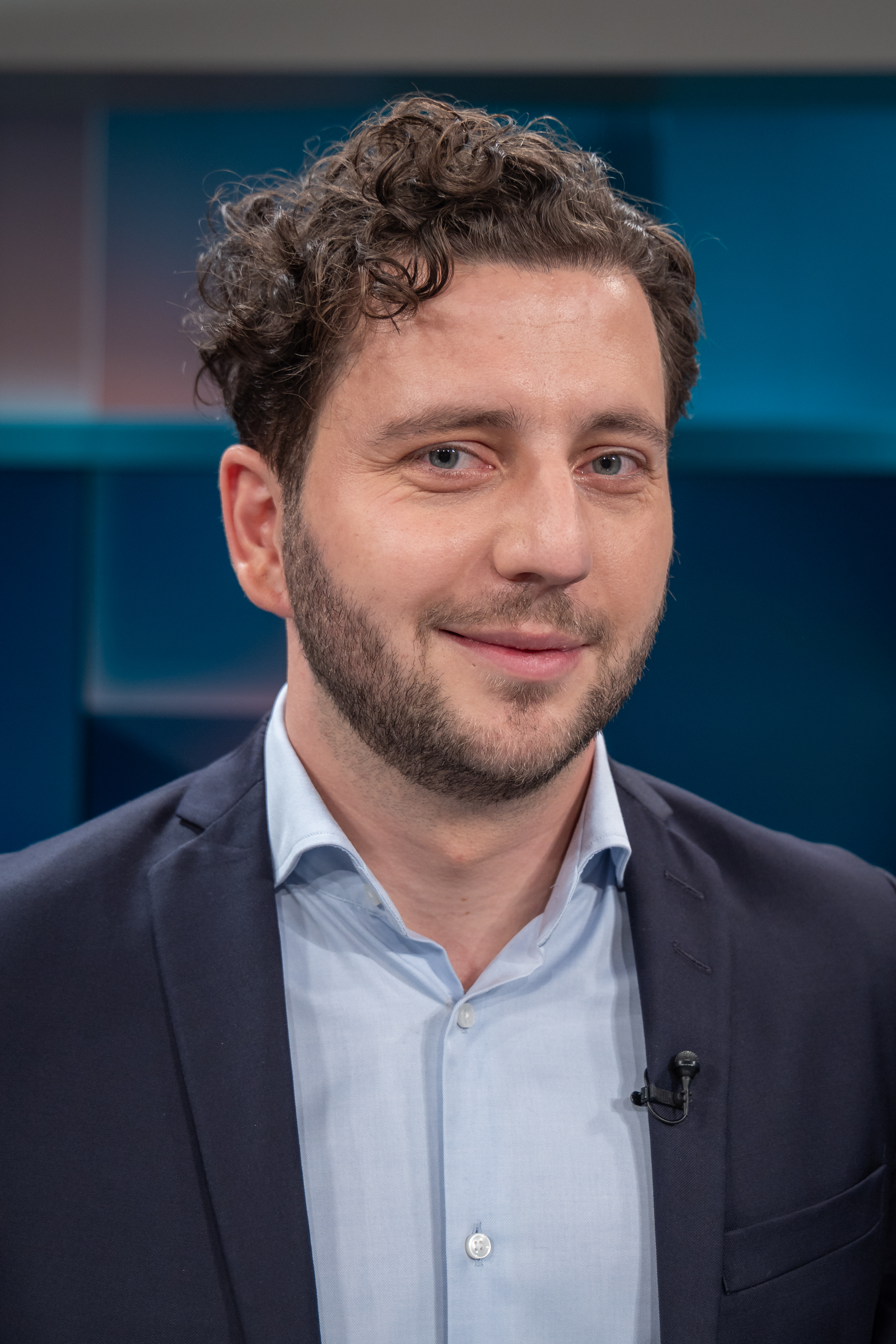
Felix Banaszak, 2024

- Gerardus Mercator (1512–1594), Flemish cartographer, inventor of the Mercator projection
- Ludwig Susen (1807–1863), elementary teacher
- August Thyssen (1842–1926), industrialist
- Wilhelm Lehmbruck (1881–1919), sculptor
- Fritz Springorum (1886–1942), industrialist and politician
- Oswald Pohl (1892–1951), Nazi SS officer executed for war crimes
- Paul Bäumer (1896–1927), World War I flying ace
- Margot Philips (1902–1988), New Zealand painter
- Ferdinand Simoneit (1925–2010), journalist and author
- Lüder Lüers (1926–2022), German horticultural architect, engaged in founding Kindernothilfe
- Dieter Kürten (born 1935), sports journalist
- Achim Warmbold (born 1941), rally driver
- Daisy Door (born 1944), Schlager music singer
- Ronny van Dyke (born Jörg T. Hartmann in 1956), singer and songwriter
- Frank Peter Zimmermann (born 1965), violinist
- Rolf van Dick (born 1967), psychologist and academic
- Bärbel Bas (born 1968), politician (SPD)
- Christoph Reuter (born 1968), musicologist
- Christian Ehring (born 1972), comedian
- Stefan Gertler (born 1972), singer
- Ramin Djawadi (born 1974), German-Iranian composer and music producer
- Sören Link (born 1976), German politician
- Nur Fettahoğlu (born 1980), Turkish-German actress
- André Lotterer (born 1981), Belgian-German racing driver
- Fabian Schrumpf (born 1982), German politician
- Lance David Arnold (born 1986), racing driver
- Benjamin Leuchter (born 1987), racing driver
- Nikolas Breuckmann (born 1988), mathematical physicist
- Felix Banaszak (born 1989), politician (Greens)
- Jacob Goll (born 1992), ice hockey player
- Ena Mahmutovic (born 2003), footballer
- Carmen Nicole Moelders

== Twin towns – sister cities ==
Duisburg is twinned with:

- Portsmouth, England, UK (1950)
- Calais, France (1964)
- Wuhan, China (1982)
- Vilnius, Lithuania (1985)
- Gaziantep, Turkey (2005)
- Perm, Russia (2007)
- San Pedro Sula, Honduras (2008)
- Lomé, Togo (2010)
- Fort Lauderdale, United States (2011)
- Kryvyi Rih, Ukraine (2023)
