= Duisburg City Hall =

City hall in Duisburg, Germany

- Rathaus Duisburg
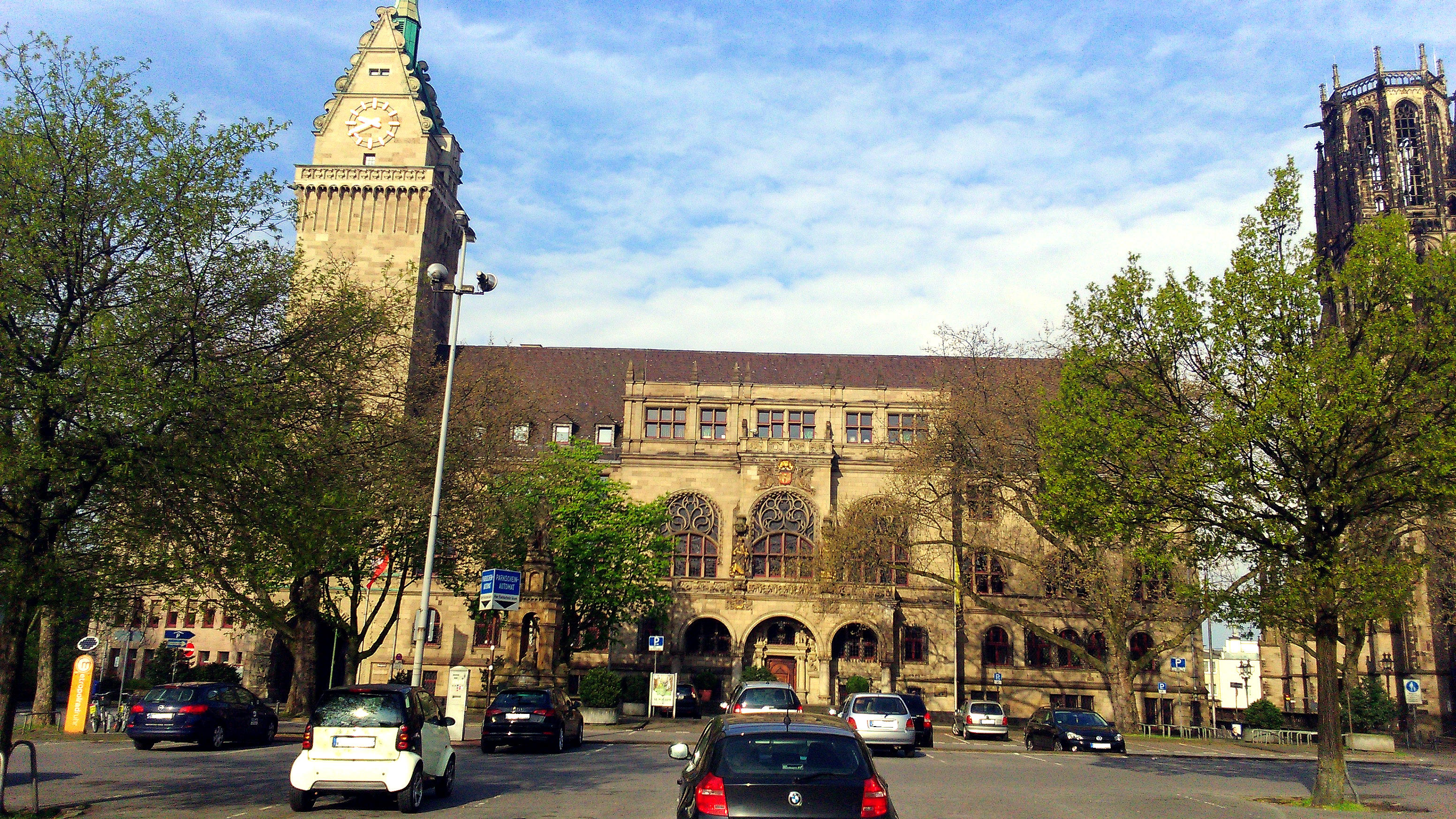
- The main frontage of the town hall in April 2016

General information
- Type: City hall
- Architectural style: Renaissance Revival style
- Location: Duisburg, Germany
- Coordinates: 51.4354°N 6.7609°E
- Construction started: 1897
- Completed: 1902

Height
- Height: 67 metres (220 ft)

Design and construction
- Architect: Friedrich Ratzel

The Duisburg City Hall (German: Rathaus Duisburg) is a municipal building in Duisburg, in western Germany, standing on Burgplatz in the old town (Altstadt) of Duisburg.

== History ==
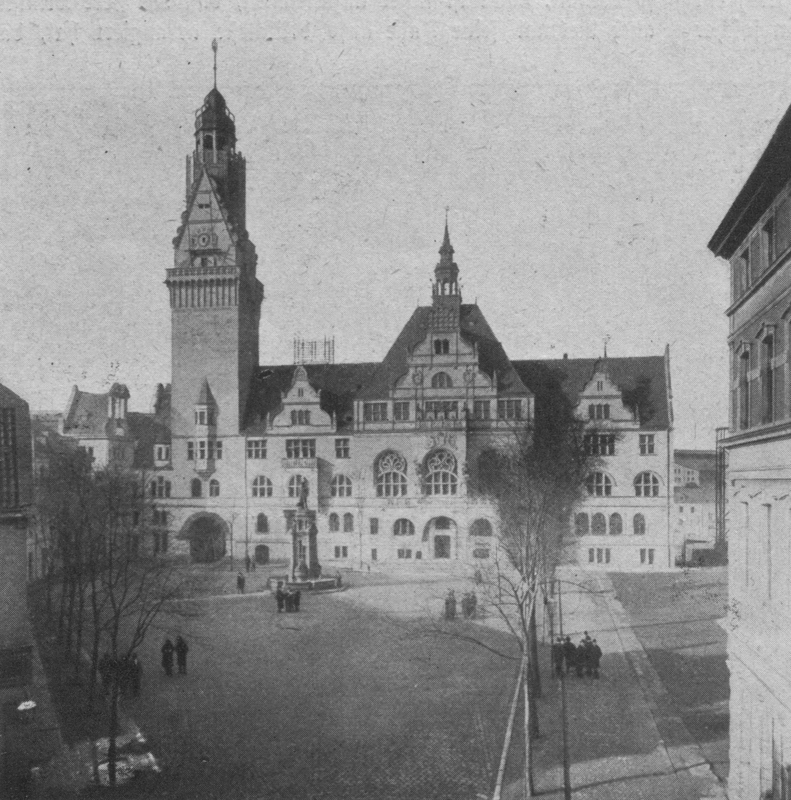
View of the town hall at Burgplatz shortly after its inauguration in 1902

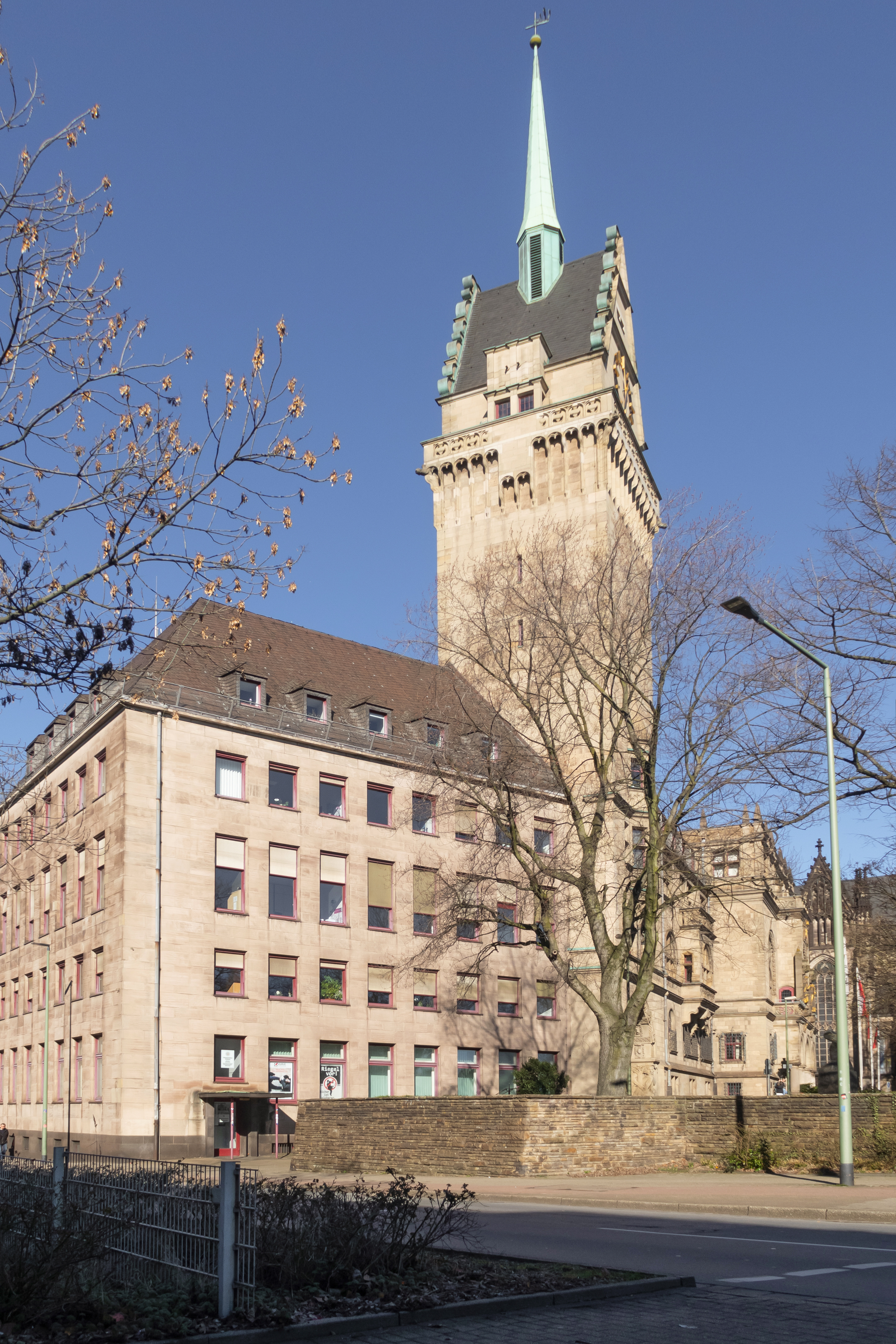
Modern extension to the town hall with tower

=== Previous buildings ===
The existence of a town hall in Duisburg can be traced back indirectly to 1274. At that time, councillors (Latin: consuls) were first mentioned. The building where the councillors met first appears in records in 1361 as "domus consulum" (Latin: house of the councillors). This was the last remaining structure of the royal palace that formed the core of the later city. It had been built in the Romanesque style and survived the devastating fire of 1283, which destroyed all the other buildings of the palace complex.

The first town hall was located slightly further south than the current building and faced west towards the Old Market, while to the east lay the now-vanished Wine Market. The oldest depiction of the town hall dates back to Johannes Corputius's plan of 1566. It shows a three-story building with a gable roof. The paired windows indicate its Romanesque origins. In the 16th century, an adjacent house was incorporated into the town hall. Little is known about any renovations to the town hall.

The building underwent extensive renovations in 1802, incorporating rubble from the demolished Koblenz tower. The first town hall was used for centuries and only lost its function due to population growth in the first half of the 19th century. In the 1840s, the first town hall was demolished and replaced with a larger new building, which for the first time faced the castle square and was completed in 1843. This building already featured a town hall passageway surmounted by a tower. The second town hall presented itself as a functional structure; only the bifora window arrangement echoed the Romanesque tradition.

The second town hall reached its capacity limits just thirty years after its completion. To ensure the administration of the rapidly growing population resulting from industrialisation, the town hall was expanded several times. The most striking addition was the tower, which took place in 1888 in connection with the purchase of an electric town hall clock. However, the distinctive slate-roofed tower was only to stand for just under 20 years, because Duisburg's population more than doubled between 1871 and 1895, forcing the city council to make a fundamental decision.

=== Construction phase and inauguration ===
On 6 December 1895, the city administration published a competition for the design of a new town hall. A total of 15,000 marks was offered as prize money, to be divided among the top three winners. Eighty-three designs were submitted. First prize was awarded to two assistants at the Karlsruhe Institute of Technology, Friedrich Ratzel and C. Boes, for their design, "Blue Five-Pointed Star." However, after receiving the prize money, the plans had to be revised due to changes requested by the city council. At this stage, Boes withdrew from the project, leaving Friedrich Ratzel solely responsible as architect.

To accommodate the significantly larger footprint of the town hall between Burgplatz and the Old Market, the city had to acquire approximately 25 houses and plots of land before construction could begin. Further demolitions were also necessary to adapt the dimensions of Burgplatz to the planned town hall. The town hall was built in stages because Ratzel was required to ensure that administrative operations continued during the construction period. During the construction work, the castle researcher Konrad Plath conducted excavations. In one such excavation, an approximately three-meter-long section of the early medieval palace wall was lowered beneath the foundations of the town hall under construction to serve as a cornerstone.

Before construction could begin on the northern section of the building complex surrounding the Gothic Church of Our Savior, objections from the Prussian Government had to be addressed. The government had demanded that the building wing near the church be lowered and that the church be given more space. Construction began on 15 August 1897. The northern wing was ready for occupancy on 1 April 1900. Subsequently, the old town hall was demolished. During the construction of the tower in the following months, further houses had to be torn down because the foundations were becoming unstable. The design involved an asymmetrical main frontage of 10 bays facing onto the Burgplatz. The central three bays, which were projected forward, were arcaded on the ground floor and were fenestrated by large arched mullioned and transomed windows on the first floor and smaller windows on the second floor, with a parapet and finials at roof level. The left hand bay was formed by a tower which was 67 metres (220 ft) high.

The town hall was inaugurated on 3 May 1902. Large segments of the city's population participated in the celebrations. The route to the town hall was lined with garlands and laurel trees. The festivities reached their climax at 11:00 a.m. in the large council chamber. Mayor Karl Lehr welcomed the Minister of the Interior, the Minister of Finance, the High President of the Rhine Province, Berthold von Nasse, and the Regional President as guests. After the ceremonial handover of the town hall keys to the mayor and a tour of the building, a celebratory dinner was held in the concert hall. The construction of the town hall had cost a total of 2.6 million gold marks, thus consuming more than a third of the city of Duisburg's annual budget at that time.

=== Changes to the building ===
The continued growth of the city of Duisburg soon necessitated interior renovations. The council chamber's furnishings had to be repeatedly adapted to changing circumstances. Between 1902 and 1924, the municipal collections, the predecessor of the Museum of Cultural and Urban History, as well as the Lehmbruck Museum, were housed in the town hall. In addition, the restrooms were expanded to meet evolving hygiene standards. Furthermore, the foyer was significantly reduced in size by the addition of a porter's lodge and the paternoster lift, which is still in operation today.

The building suffered its greatest damage during the air raids of the Second World War. In 1943, the roof truss and the top story of the tower were gutted by fire after a bomb hit, although the gable walls survived the attack relatively unscathed. Reconstruction began in 1951. Instead of a faithful restoration of the original structure, a simplified reconstruction was chosen. Smaller turrets were removed, the roof was made smooth, and the three gables facing the castle square were not rebuilt. The town hall tower received a simple gable roof, and the topping-out ceremony was celebrated on 19 September 1952.
