= Sören Link =

German politician (born 1976)

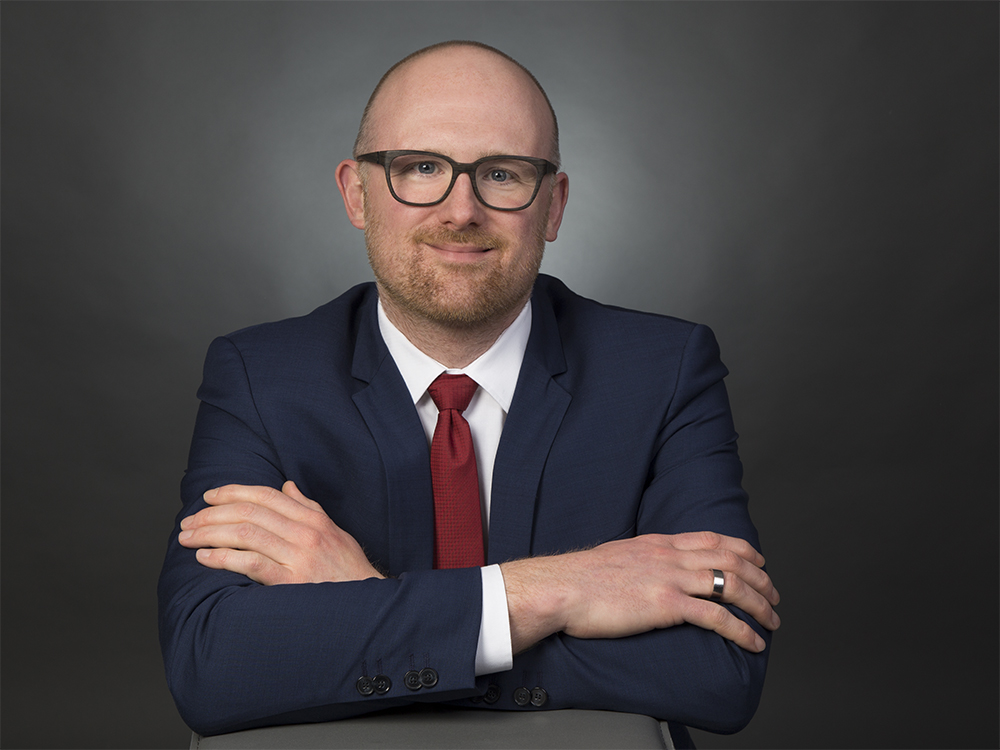
- Link in 2016

Member of the Landtag of North Rhine-Westphalia
- In office 8 June 2005 – 14 March 2012
- Preceded by: Ralf Jäger
- Succeeded by: Frank Börner
- Constituency: Duisburg IV

Personal details
- Born: 28 June 1976 (age 50) Duisburg
- Party: Social Democratic Party (since 1993)

Sören Link (born 28 June 1976 in Duisburg) is a German politician serving as mayor of Duisburg since 2012. From 2005 to 2012, he was a member of the Landtag of North Rhine-Westphalia.
