= Fabian Schrumpf =

German politician (born 1982)

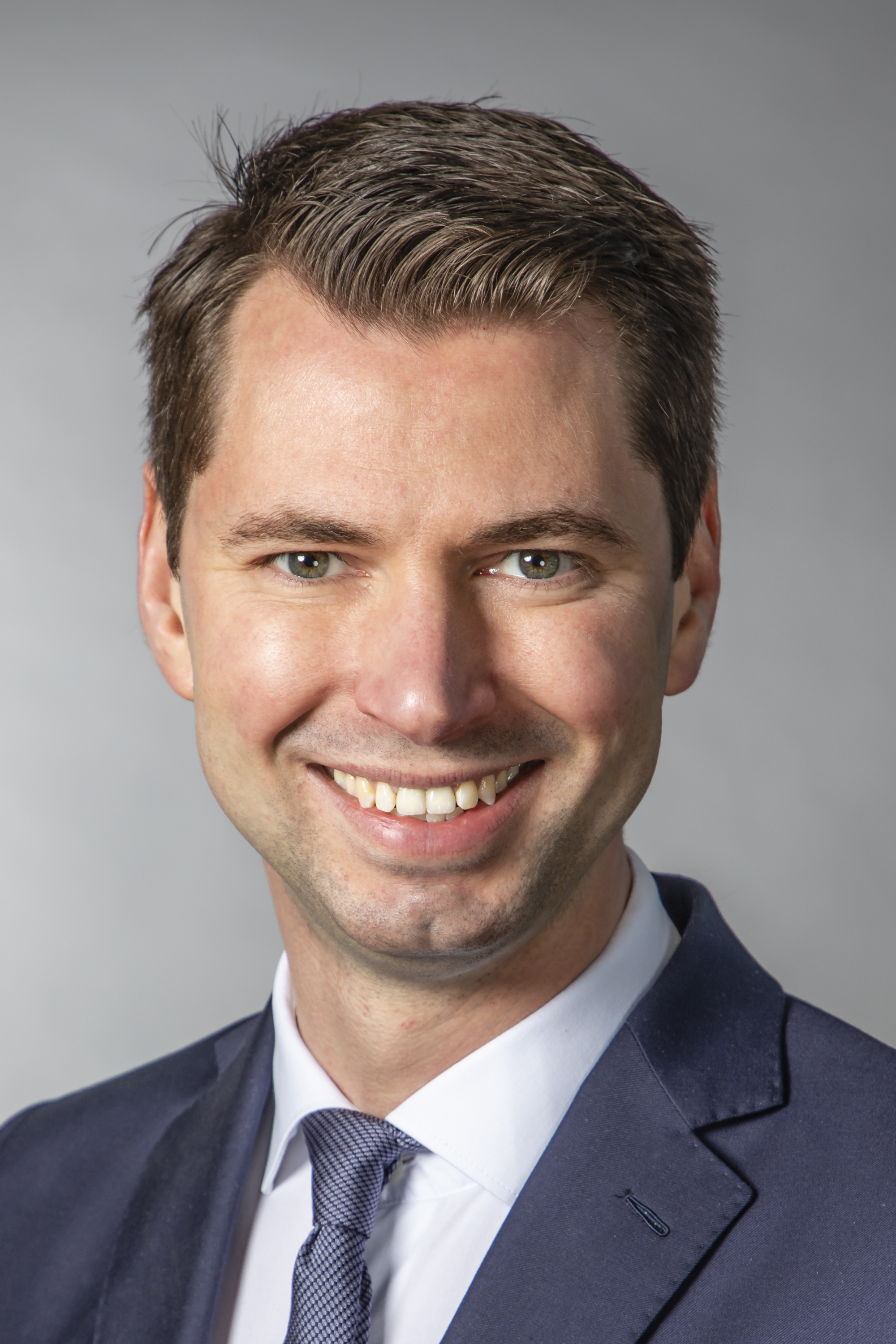
- Schrumpf in 2019

Member of the Landtag of North Rhine-Westphalia
- Incumbent
- Assumed office 1 June 2017
- Preceded by: Peter Weckmann
- Constituency: Essen IV

Personal details
- Born: 5 October 1982 (age 43) Duisburg
- Party: Christian Democratic Union (since 2000)

Fabian Schrumpf (born 5 October 1982 in Duisburg) is a German politician serving as a member of the Landtag of North Rhine-Westphalia since 2017. He has served as group leader of the Christian Democratic Union in the city council of Essen since 2020.
