= Jacob Goll =

German ice hockey player

- Born: November 14, 1992 (age 32); Duisburg, Germany
- Height: 5 ft 11 in (180 cm)
- Weight: 154 lb (70 kg; 11 st 0 lb)
- Position: Goaltender
- Catches: Left
- Ger.4 team Former teams: TSV Peißenberg; EHC München
- Playing career: 2012–present

Jacob Goll (born November 14, 1992) is a German ice hockey goaltender. He is currently playing with TSV Peißenberg of the German Oberliga.

Goll made his Deutsche Eishockey Liga debut playing with EHC München during the 2011–12 DEL season.
