= Ronny van Dyke =

German singer and songwriter

Ronny van Dyke (born Jörg T. Hartmann; 1 March 1956 in Duisburg, Germany) is a German singer and songwriter.

He gave his first concert in 1973 with psychedelic rock band P.S.I. He focused on composing and wrote hundreds of songs. Together with Norbert Jürgen Schneider in 1991, he realized a project called "Rock contra Classic". He toured with a classic quartet in Germany. Since 1990 he has released several albums. From 1992 to 1994 he composed background music for the TV series “Marienhof for German Television ARD. Marienhof was telecasted in 13 countries. In 1993, he produced the album Naked Fools with Frank Diez (guit. of Peter Maffay), Wolfgang Haffner (dr. Chaka Khan), Jo Barnikel (key Konstantin Wecker).

== Discography ==
- Album, Life is a Comic Strip, Heartbeat Records 1990
- Single, "Berlin", Heartbeat Records 1991
- Marienhof, ARD, background songs 1992
- Album, Naked Fools", Tom Duke's Wham Bam, Heartbeat Records, Semaphore 1993
- Marienhof ARD series, international roll out 1994
- Album Live at Monthies (Silent Heroes) KingsDeal Music 2001
- Album Workers Paradise (Silent Heroes) KingsDeal Music 2006
- Album Traditionals KingsDeal Music 2007
- Album Materialized KingsDeal Music 2008
- Maxi "Sound Samples" KingsDeal Music 2010
- Album Rockers ´n´ Lovers KingsDeal Music 2013
- Single "Last Curtain Lullaby", KingsDeal Music 2015
