= Stefan Gertler =

German singer

Stefan Gertler (born on 05.08.1972 in Duisburg) is a German singer. He first came on RTL TV on the German version of Britain's Got Talent, Das Supertalent.

Stefan performed the song Home by Michael Bublé on 15 October 2011.

== References (in German) ==
- Das Supertalent | Die Talent-Show bei RTL
- Das Supertalent | Die Talent-Show bei RTL
- http://www.clipfish.de/special/supertalent/video/3680908/supertalent-2011-stefan-gertler-singt-home/
