= Ludwig Susen =

German teacher

Coordinates: 51.431525°N 6.756973°E

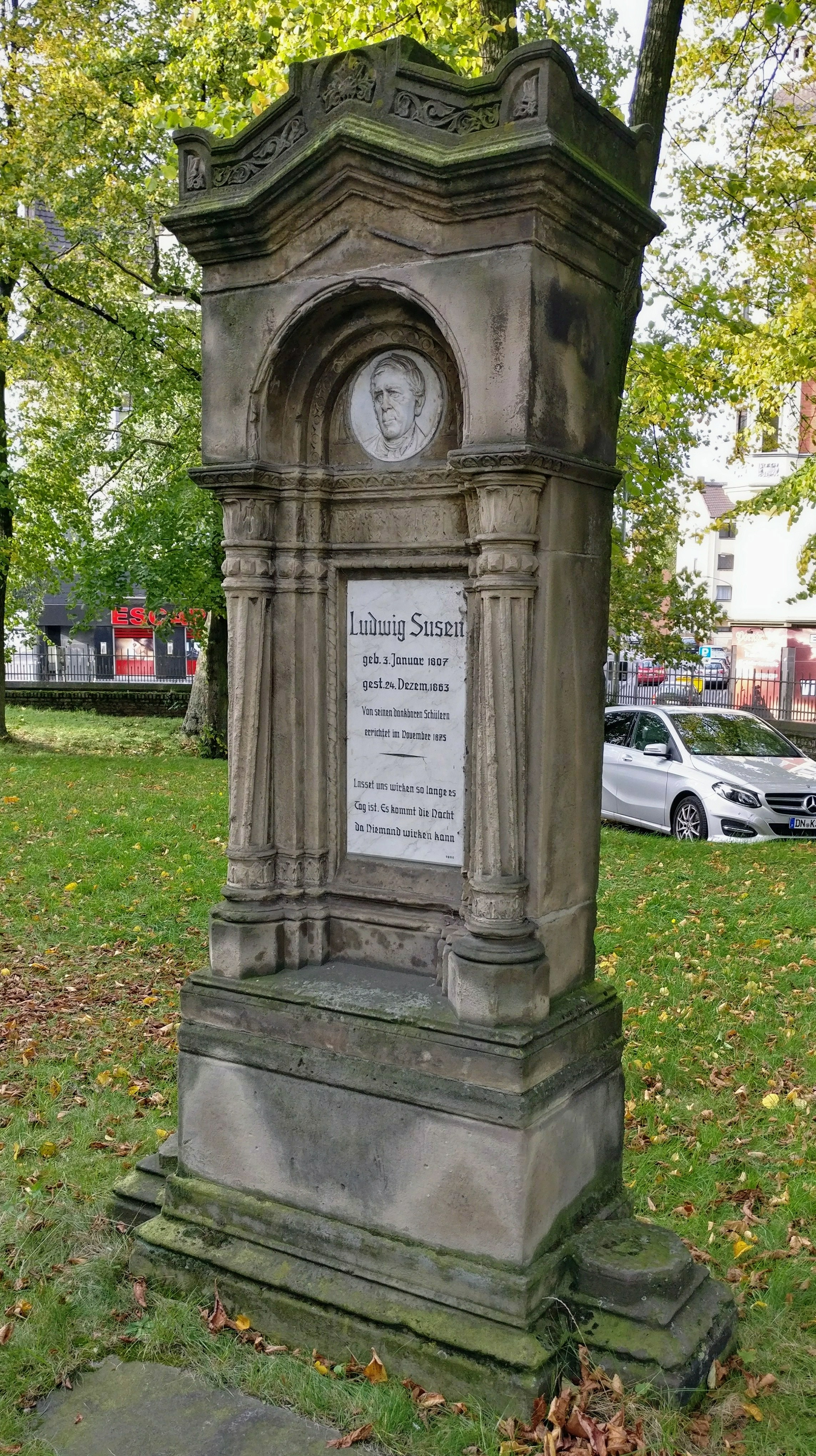
- The monument in honor of Ludwig Susen in the old cemetery of St. Mary's church Duisburg
- Born: 3 January 1807
- Died: 24 December 1863 (aged 56); Duisburg, Germany
- Occupation: Elementary teacher

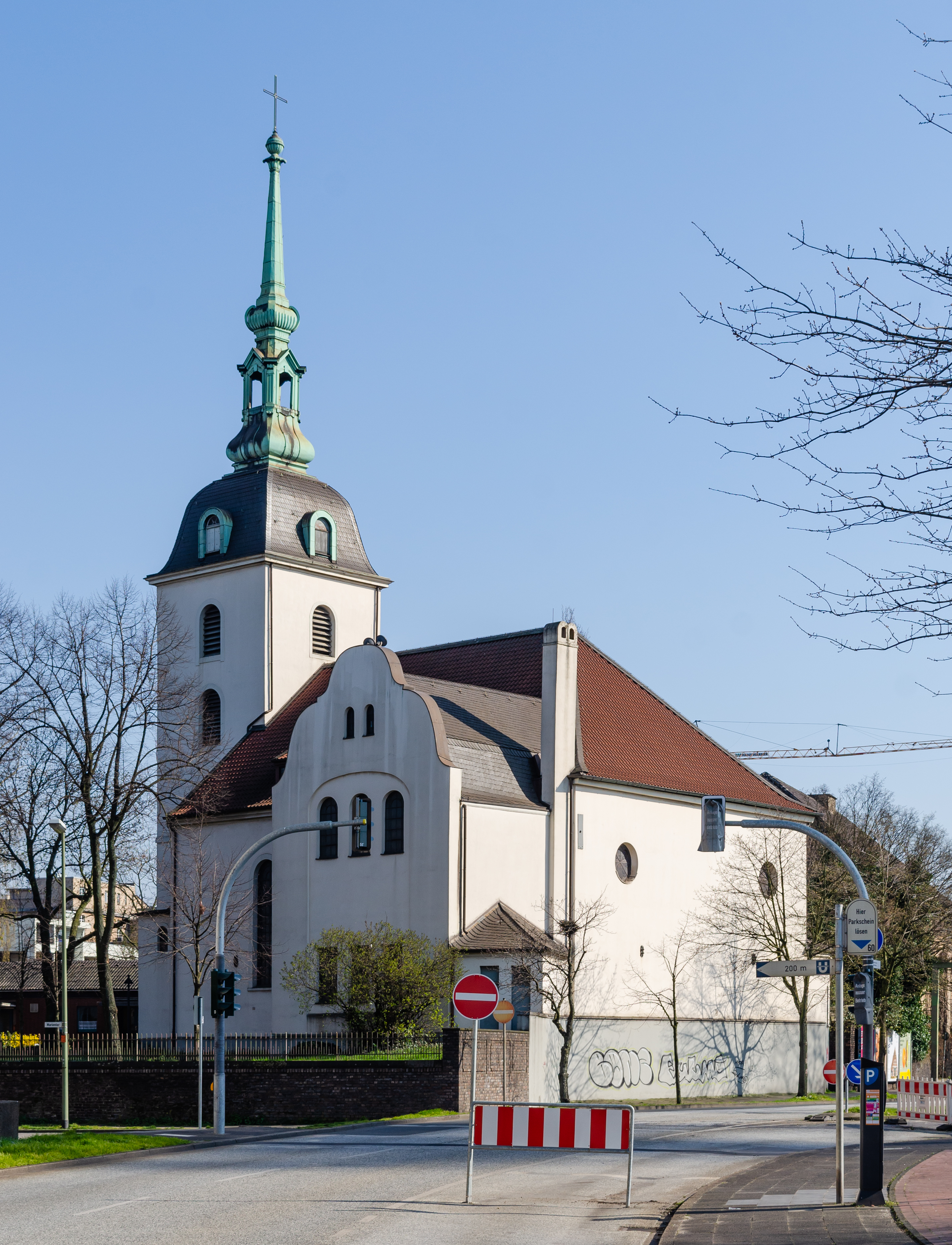
Protestant St. Mary's Church in Duisburg

Ludwig Susen (3 January 1807 – 24 December 1863) was a German elementary teacher, who worked and lived mainly in Duisburg.

== Work and legacy ==
Susen worked as elementary teacher in Duisburg following his admittance by the Administrative District of Düsseldorf in 1832. The city chronics of Duisburg state that Susen discovered the pedagogic talent of one of his students, the later Friemersheim teacher Friedrich Wilhelm Guillaume (1838–1926), and convinced Guillaume's father not to let his son become a craftsman but a teacher.

After Susen's death in 1863, a monument was erected in his honor on the cemetery of the Protestant St. Mary's church in Duisburg's historic center in 1875. The statue, which is often referred to as "Teacher's Monument", was declared a protected monument on 15 December 1992 in accordance with § 3 (2) DSchG of the North Rhine-Westphalia monument act. The inscription of the monument quotes the Gospel of John, Verse 9:4: "We must work the works of him who sent me while it is day; night is coming, when no one can work."

== Personal life ==
Ludwig Susen was born to his father Bernhard Susen. He married Johanna Susen (born Busch) in 1831, with whom he had two daughters Christiane and Maria. Sources state that he was at a later point married to Maria Susen (born Mühles).
