= Johannes Corputius =

Dutch engineer, cartographer, and military leader

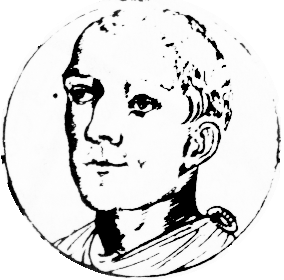

Johan van den Corput (also van (den) Kornput, also Cornput or Johannes de Corput, in German literature Johannes Corputius; April 1542 – September 17, 1611) was a Dutch engineer, cartographer, and military leader.

Corputius was born in Breda. He is the author of the well colored Corputius Plan, which shows the city of Duisburg from the air, completed in 1566. He died, aged 69, in Groningen.

== Biography ==
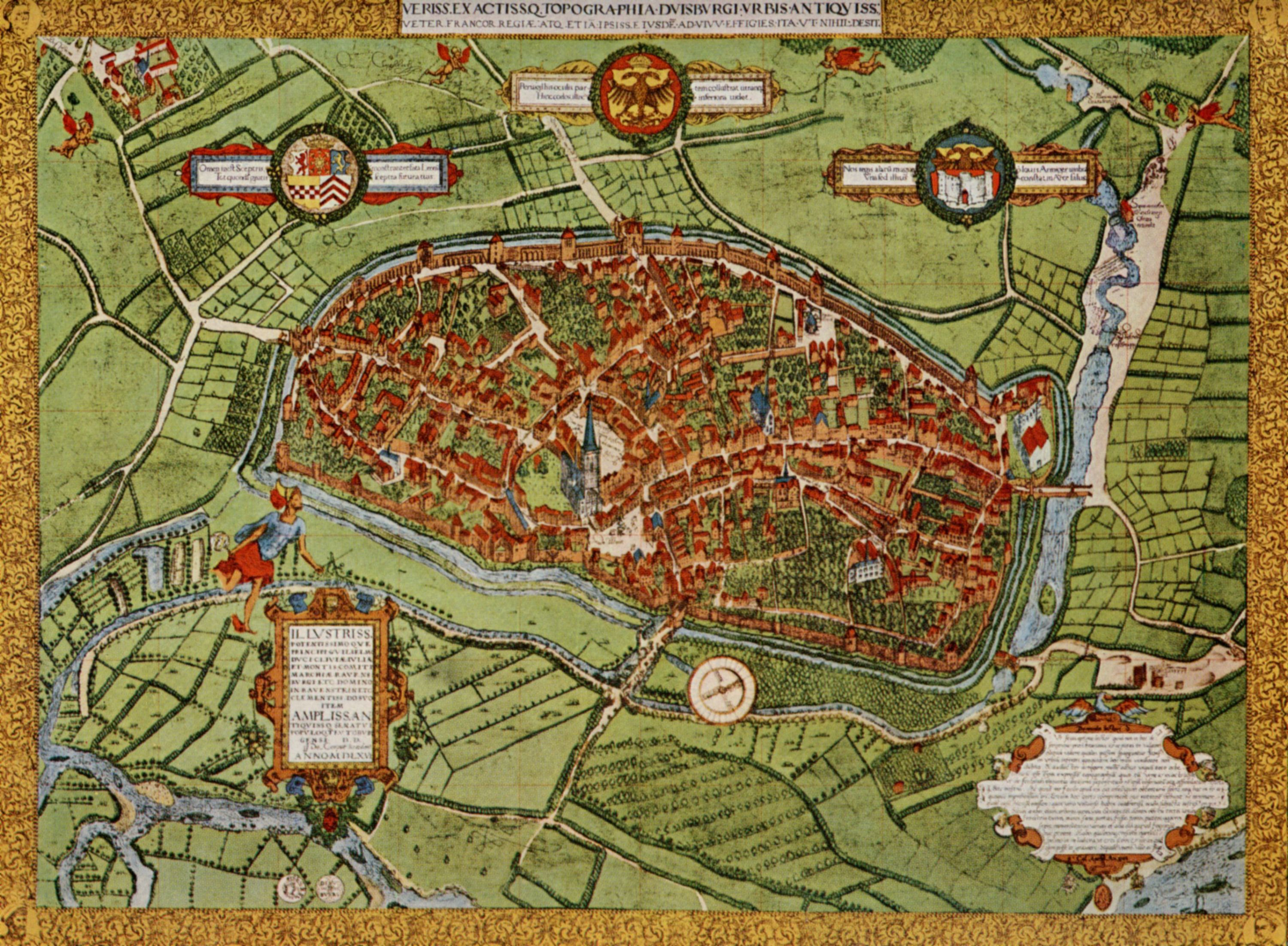

Johan van den Corput was born in April 1542 in Breda, in the Low Countries (now the Netherlands). He was a Dutch engineer, cartographer, and military figure active in the later 16th century.

In 1566 he created the Corputius Plan, a detailed, coloured bird's-eye view of Duisburg, then in the Duchy of Cleves (now in North Rhine-Westphalia, Germany). The plan, the earliest known map of the city, depicts Duisburg within its defensive walls and surrounding waterways and is noted for its high level of detail and precise measurement, while preserving the city’s late medieval layout.

He died on 17 September 1611 in Groningen, in the Dutch Republic (now the Netherlands), aged 69.

== Literature ==
=== Dutch literature ===
- Jan Pieter Johannes Postema: Johan van den Corput: 1542-1611; kaartmaker, vestingbouwer, krijgsman, summary in English, Kampen: Ijsselakademie, 1993, ISBN 90-6697-063-4

=== German literature ===
- Jan P. J. Postema: Johannes Corputius (1542-1611); Kriegsmann, Kartenzeichner, Festungsbauer; in: Kraume, Hans-Georg [ed.]: Duisburger Forschungen 35, Duisburg: Braun, 1987, p. 26-50; ISBN 3-87096-046-9
- Der Duisburger Stadtplan des Johannes Corputius von 1566, Multimedia-CD-Rom, ed.: Gerhard-Mercator-Gesellschaft e.V., Duisburg 2002
- Duisburg im Jahre 1566: der Stadtplan des Johannes Corputius (=Duisburger Forschungen 40), ed.: Joseph Milz / Günter von Roden, Duisburg 1993. ISBN 3-87096-051-5
- Heike Hawicks: Der Duisburger Stadtplan des Johannes Corputius von 1566, vom frühneuzeitlichen "Werbeprospekt" zur modernen Multimedia-CD-ROM, in: Duisburger Forschungen 51, Duisburg: Mercator-Verl., 2004, p. 225-234, ISBN 3-87463-377-2
- Frosien-Leinz, Heike: Der Corputius-Plan: Kommunales Selbstbewusstsein und Werbemittel, in: Frosien-Leinz, Heike [Red.]: Von Flandern zum Niederrhein: Wirtschaft und Kultur überwinden Grenzen; Begleitband zur Ausstellung, ed.: Stadt Duisburg - Die Oberbürgermeisterin, Kultur- und Stadthistorisches Museum Duisburg, 2000, p. 87-100, ISBN 3-89279-560-6
- Joseph Milz: Der Duisburger Stadtplan des Johannes Corputius und seine Vermessungsgrundlagen. In: Cartographica Helvetica Heft 11 (1995) p. 2–10, ISSN 1015-8480, Volltext, reprint in: Kraume, Hans Georg [ed.]: Duisburger Forschungen Band 45. Duisburg: Mercator-Verl., 2000. p. 1-23. ISBN 3-87463-295-4
- Joseph Milz: Die Vermessung des Duisburger Stadtplanes von 1566 durch Johannes Corputius, in: Hantsche, Irmgard (ed.): Der "mathematicus": zur Entwicklung und Bedeutung einer neuen Berufsgruppe in der Zeit Gerhard Mercators [Referate des 4. Mercator-Symposiums, 30. - 31. Oktober 1995], Duisburger Mercator-Studien 4, Bochum: Brockmeyer, 1996, p. [227]-250, ISBN 3-8196-0474-X
- Joseph Milz: Neue Quellen und Forschungen zu Johannes Corputius, in Duisburger Forschungen, Band 31, ed.: Stadtarchiv Duisburg in Verbindung mit d. Mercator-Ges. [Für d. Schriftl. verantwortl.: Joseph Milz], Duisburg: Braun, 1982, p. 117-125, ISBN 3-87096-042-6
