= Sarah Philipp =

German politician (born 1983)

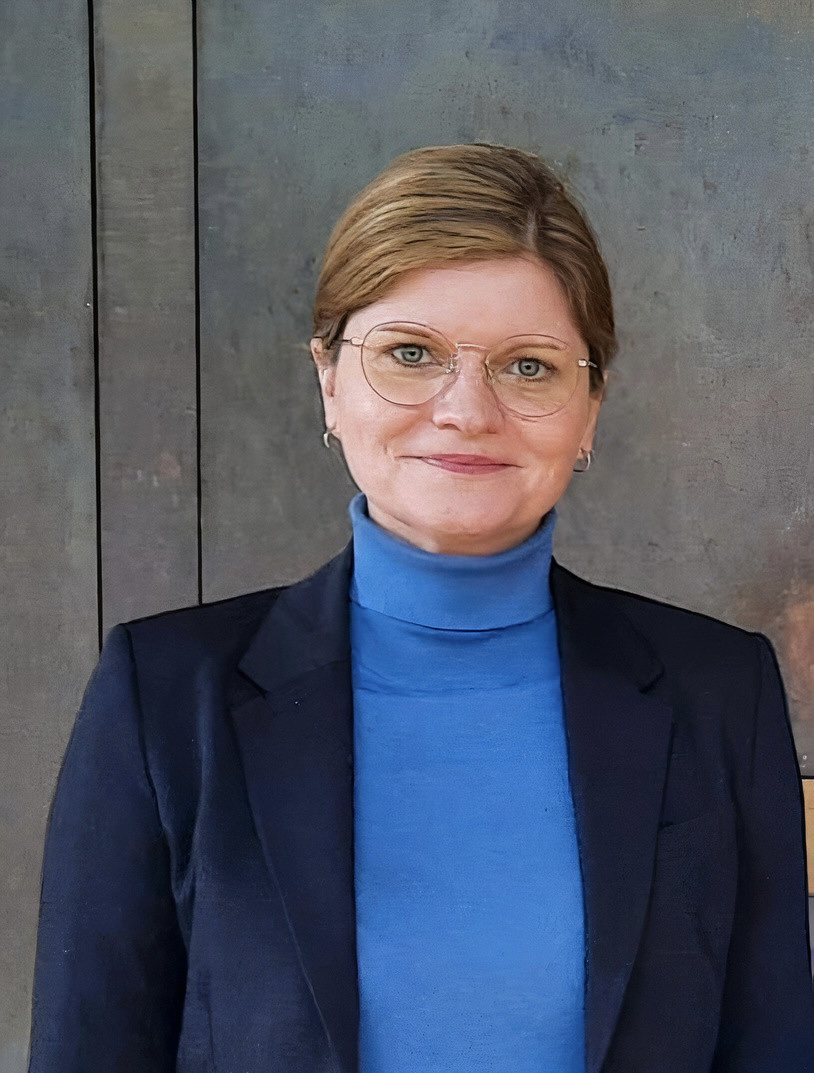
- Philipp in 2023

Member of the Landtag of North Rhine-Westphalia
- Incumbent
- Assumed office 31 May 2012

Personal details
- Born: 10 March 1983 (age 43)
- Party: Social Democratic Party

Sarah Philipp (born 10 March 1983) is a German politician serving as a member of the Landtag of North Rhine-Westphalia since 2012. She has served as co-chair of SPD North Rhine-Westphalia since 2023.
