= Wucherer =

Wucherer is a surname. Notable people with the name include:

- Denis Wucherer (born 1973), German basketball player and coach
- Fritz Wucherer (1873–1948), Swiss painter
- Gerhard Wucherer (born 1948), German sprinter
- Ludwig Wucherer (1790–1861), German entrepreneur
- Otto Edward Henry Wucherer (1820–1873), Brazilian physician and naturalist
