= Alte Brücke (Frankfurt) =

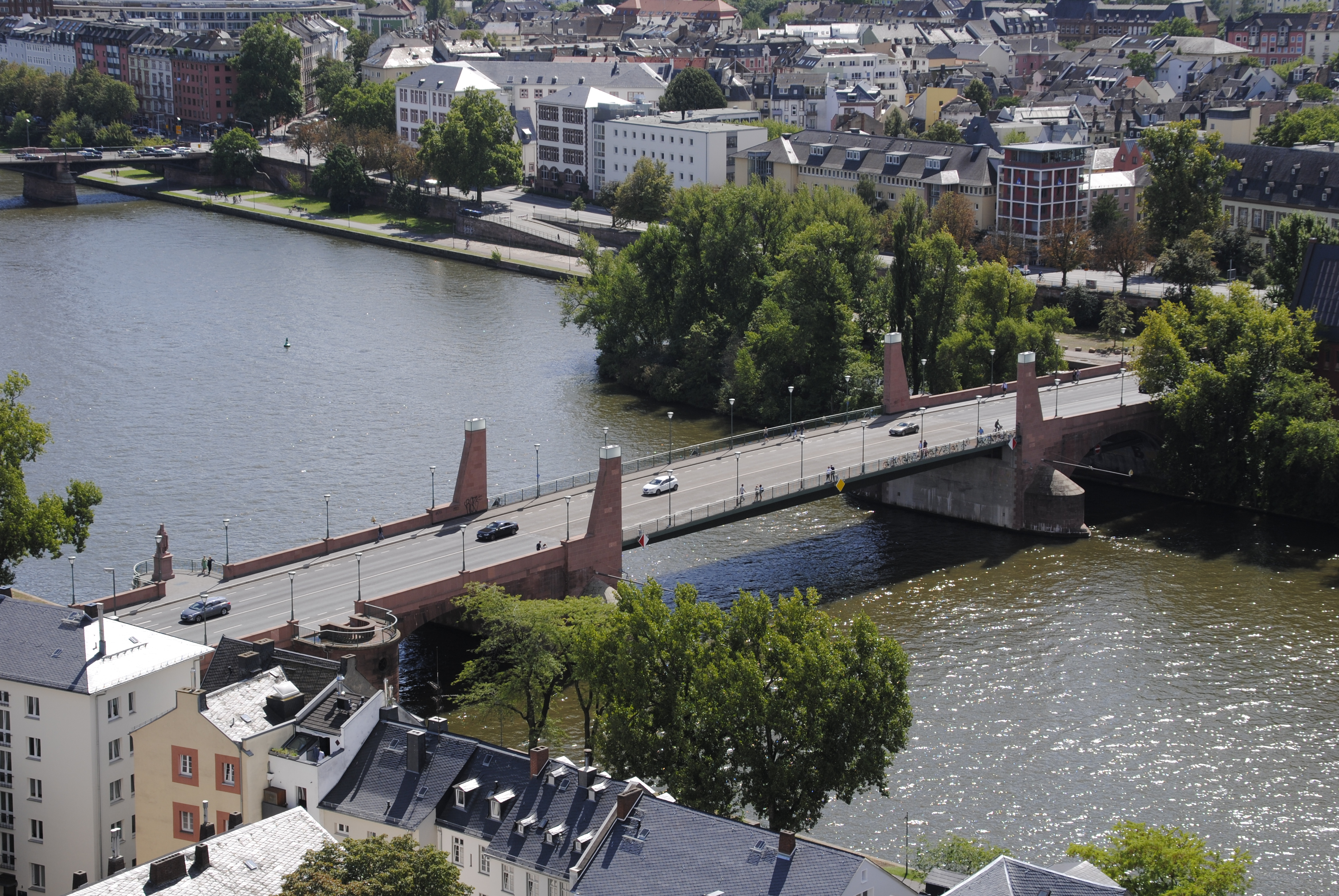
- Alte Brücke, seen from top of Frankfurt Cathedral, August 2017
- Coordinates: 50°06′27″N 8°41′16″E
- Carries: Motor vehicles, bicycles, pedestrians
- Crosses: Main (river)
- Locale: Frankfurt Altstadt, Sachsenhausen (river kilometer 35.65)

Characteristics
- Design: Arch bridge, through truss bridge
- Total length: 237.36 m (778.7 ft)
- Width: 19.5 m (64 ft)
- Traversable?: yes
- Longest span: 70 m (230 ft)
- Clearance below: (?)

History
- Construction end: before 1222
- Rebuilt: at least 18 times, 1912–1926, 1965

Location
- Interactive map of Alte Brücke

Alte Brücke (German: "old bridge") is a bridge in Frankfurt, Hesse, Germany. It is the oldest bridge over the lower course of the river Main, and until 1886 was the only stone bridge crossing the river. From the Middle Ages until the year 1914, it connected the "Fahrgasse" in Frankfurt Altstadt with the "Brückenstraße" in Sachsenhausen. Since its first mention in official documents in 1222, the development of Frankfurt has been strongly influenced by the bridge. Over the centuries, Alte Brücke has been destroyed and reconstructed at least 18 times. With its 13 brick-built circular arches, the Sachsenhausen Bridge was one of the most prominent buildings of the city, but failing to meet the increasing demands of the modern road and ship traffic, it was demolished in 1914.

The current Alte Brücke, sometimes called "Neue Alte Brücke" (German: "new old bridge"), was inaugurated on 15 August 1926 by then-Lord-Mayor Ludwig Landmann. Two of its originally eight red sandstone-lined vaults were blown up by German soldiers on 26 March 1945. After an initial provisional reconstruction, the middle part of the bridge was replaced by a steel through truss bridge and placed in operation again on 15 September 1965.

In 2006, the Alte Brücke received a new porticus, which resembles a watermill that had historically been present at the bridge. Today, the view of the bridge is characterized by four portal walls at both sides of the bridge's middle part. These have been built in the course of a complete renovation in 2014. Landmarks of the Alte Brücke are the "Brickegickel" and a statue of Charlemagne, mythical founder of the city.

== History ==
=== 11th – 14th century ===
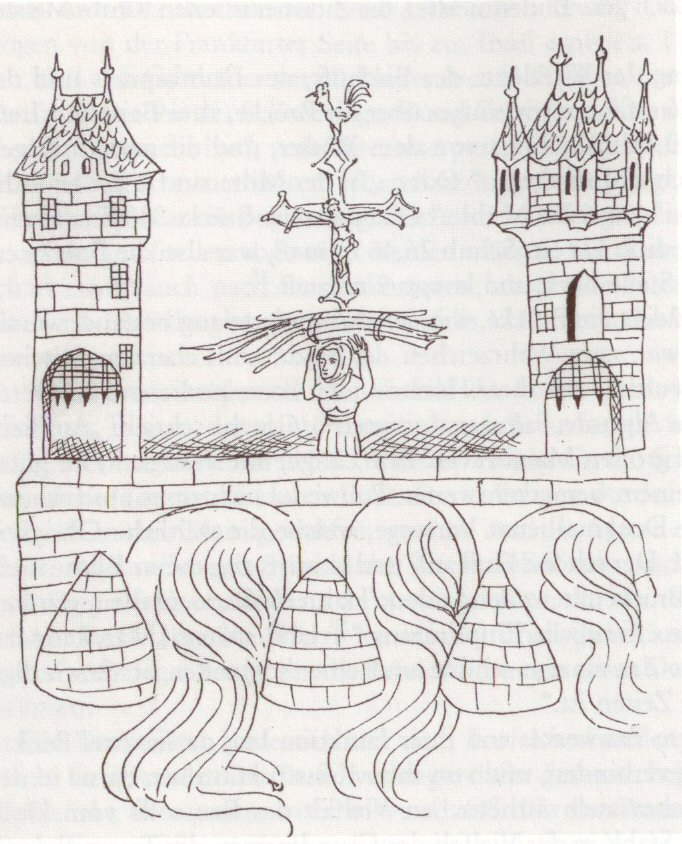
The oldest depiction of the Alte Brücke, from the "Bedebuch" of 1405

Originally there was a ford (German: Furt) near the Alte Brücke, possibly slightly downstream near the Fahrtor, giving the city its name. It is unclear exactly when the first bridge between Frankfurt and Sachsenhausen was built. Sachsenhausen's first mention in historic records was in 1193. The first known mention of the bridge was in 1222 in the records of Frankfurt Cathedral, referring to a "burgage plot at the bridge" ("Hofstätte an der Brücke") belonging to a magistrate named Nikolaus. However, the bridge might be older than this: Chronicler Achilles Augustus von Lersner, who lived in Frankfurt, wrote at the beginning of the 18th century:

"The bridge which connects both cities was built of wood in 1035 and it stood for so many years that it often suffered great water damage, especially in 1192."
German: "Die Brücke welche die beyde Städte an einander hänget ist 1035 von Holtz gebauet worden, und hat solche viele Jahre gestanden, auch offters dessentwegen großen Schaden vom Gewässer erlitten, zumalen 1192".

In the 19th century the historian Johann Georg Battonn said:

"It is much older, and I believe I am not mistaken when I attribute its first foundations to Charlemagne, who built a palace here around 782, and probably also built the stone bridge over the River Main at the same time."
German: "Sie ist aber weit älter, und ich glaube nicht zu irren, wenn ich ihre erste Grundlage Karl dem Grossen zueigene, welcher ums Jahr 782 hier ein Palatium, und wahrscheinlich um die nämliche Zeit auch die steinerne Brücke über den Main erbaute."

This assumption is now considered to be improbable. The oldest medieval stone bridge, the Drususbrücke in Bingen, was built in the 11th century. Larger stone bridges like those in Regensburg, Prag and Würzburg were built after the 12th century. This indicates that the bridge in Frankfurt was actually built of wood in the 11th century or the early 12th century, as stated by von Lersner, and that it was rebuilt after 1192 — possibly on the orders of Ministeralis Kuno von Münzenberg, who owned large properties on both sides of the river. The rebuilt bridge, according to earliest documents, was built partly of wood, with pillars made of stone. A "stone bridge" in the Frankfurt region does not appear in historical documents until 1276.

In the 1920s, a row of oak poles became visible at low water level upstream of the bridge. This led to speculation that the poles were from an old Roman bridge. However, it is more likely that these poles were of medieval origin and had been used for fishing or flood protection.

During the 12th and 13th century, Frankfurt grew to one of the most important trading centres of the Holy Roman Empire, not least because of the importance of its bridge, which for centuries was a major part of the north–south travel route of the Main region. On 10 May 1235, King Henry (VII) of Germany granted substantial privileges to the citizens of the city. Half of the Frankfurt coin revenue, and timber from the royal hunting forest of Wildbann Dreieich, was assigned to the maintenance of the bridge. There is also document from 1300, in which 15 Italian bishops promised indulgences to those who supported the maintenance of Alte Brücke with their donations.

In the 14th century the bridge was destroyed by floods and melting ice many times:

"On the evening of 1 February 1306, the Main, because of ice and water, was so high that it knocked away the two bridge towers and many parts of the bridge. A large crowd of people stood on the bridge and 10 of them drowned."
German: Anno 1306 an unser Frauen Lichtmeß Abend (1. Februar) ist der Meyn allhier von Eyß und Gewässer so groß gewesen, daß er die zwey Thürn und den mehrern Theil an der Brücken hinweg gestossen ein groß Volck ist damahls auff der Brücken gestanden, darvon 10 Personen ertruncken.

The two bridge towers were mentioned for the first time in this report. On 22 July 1342, the most severe flood in Central Europe up to that date occurred. It is known as the St. Mary Magdalene's flood. In the course of the flood, the 1338 Chapel of St. Catherine and a bridge tower collapsed. These were both on the Sachsenhausen side of the Main, which was more strongly exposed to the water currents. Between the time of the flood until the Reformation, in the 16th century, an atonement procession from the Alte Brücke to the Weißfrauenkirche church was held annually on 22 July.

=== 15th – 18th century ===
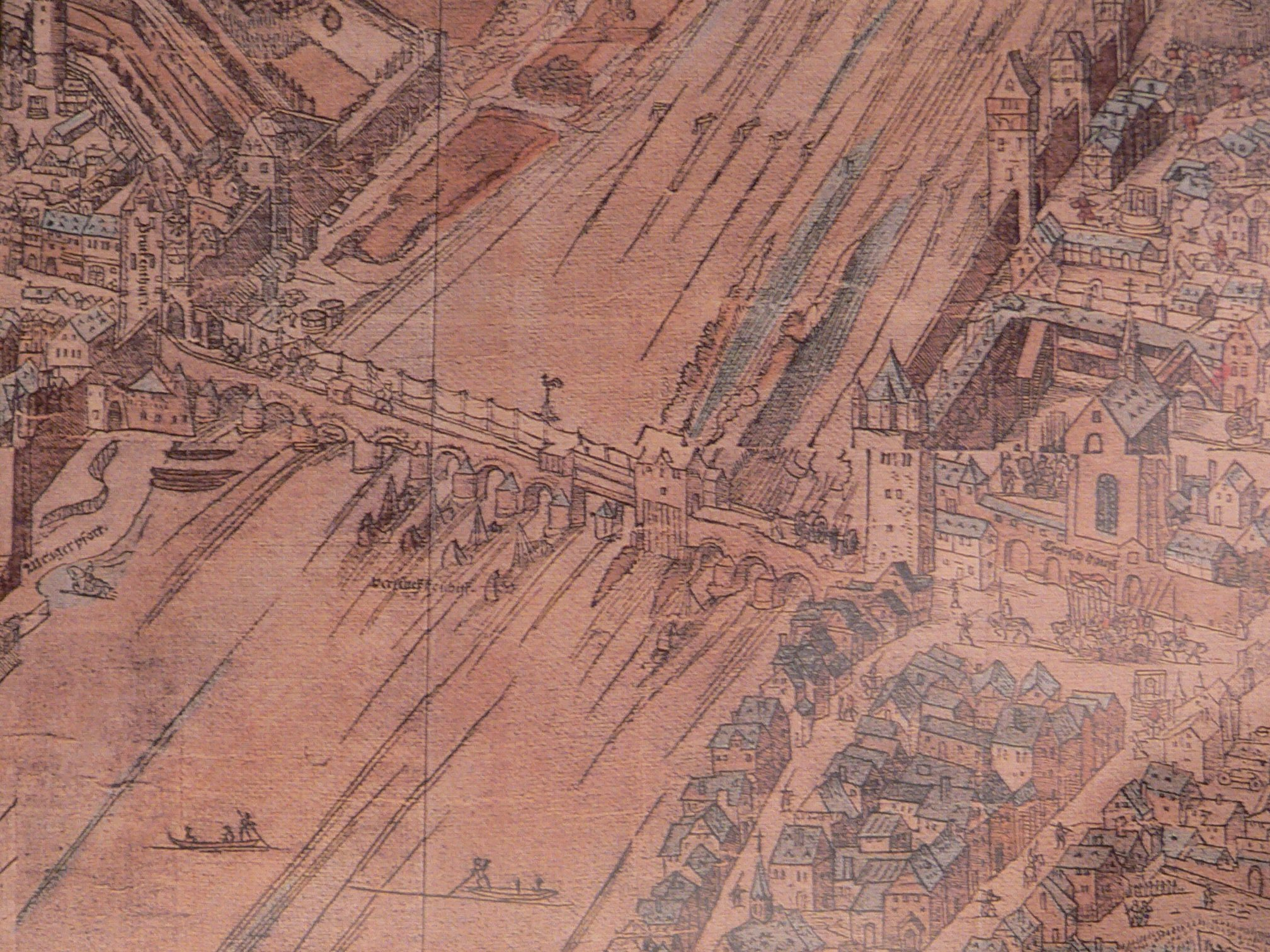
The Frankfurt Bridge on the besiegement plan of 1552

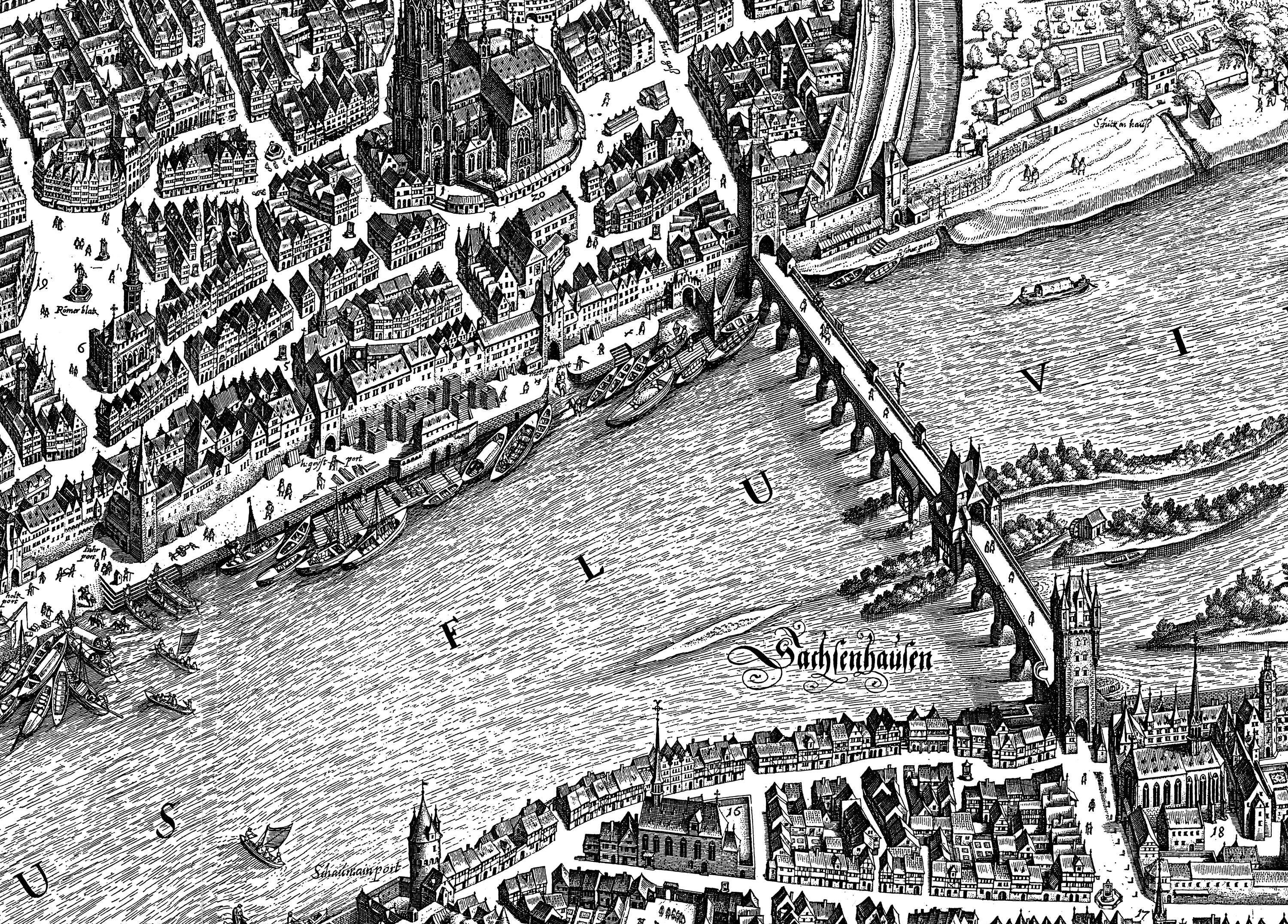
The Frankfurt Bridge on the Merian plan of 1628

In the beginning of the 15th century, 10 of the 13 bridge arches as well as the two bridge towers were fundamentally renovated. The accountable architect might have been Madern Gerthener, who personally vouched for the safety of the vaults and arches in front of the (city?) council on 30 November 1399. On a hiking trip in Prague, Gerthener learned about the Charles Bridge, which had been built shortly before by Peter Parler. The oldest depiction of this bridge comes from 1405: It is shown in stylized form in the "Bedebuch" (burnt in World War II), with the two towers, three arches and the crucifix of the Brickegickel. The oldest complete drawing can be found in the Cosmographia of Sebastian Münster, as a part of the birds-eye view of Frankfurt, in the second issue from 1550. It is a woodcut which itself is dated 1545. Shortly thereafter, in 1552, another depiction appeared on the so-called "Belagerungsplan" (besiegement plan) of Conrad Faber von Creuznach, who had already sketched the bridge in the background of his double portrait of Anna and Gilbrecht von Holzhausen in 1535. It shows the bridge during the three-week besiegement of the Protestant city by an army of the Protestant prince, under lead of the Prince-elector Maurice, Elector of Saxony in the summer of 1552, when it was defended by the Imperial Army. During this time, the bridge had been covered by cloths, and the Main had been rendered impassable by sunken ships and an iron chain. The besiegement started on 17 July and ended with the conclusion of the Peace of Passau contract on 2 August. For the city, the loyalty to the imperator paid off well: Beginning with 1562, all coronations of the Holy Roman Emperor took place in Frankfurt.

In the early 17th century, the last wooden pillar of the bridge, located north of the bridge mill, was replaced by a stone equivalent. However, the ceiling of the bridge still consisted of wooden bars which could be removed quickly to prevent passing of the bridge.

The bridge had a width of 31 feet (about 9 m), including the bridge parapet made of stone, which had been one foot wide each. The highest arch, when the water level was at a normal state, was about 30 feet (8.50 m) above the water; the other arches had been 2–3 feet lower in comparison. The horizontal clearance below the bridge, between two arches, had been between 7.50 m and 9 m. The street on top of the bridge was only about 4.70 m wide, just enough to allow passing of two vehicles next to each other. The footpaths had been so small that they had to be declared one-way paths: pedestrians had to take the path on the right side, relative to their walking direction.

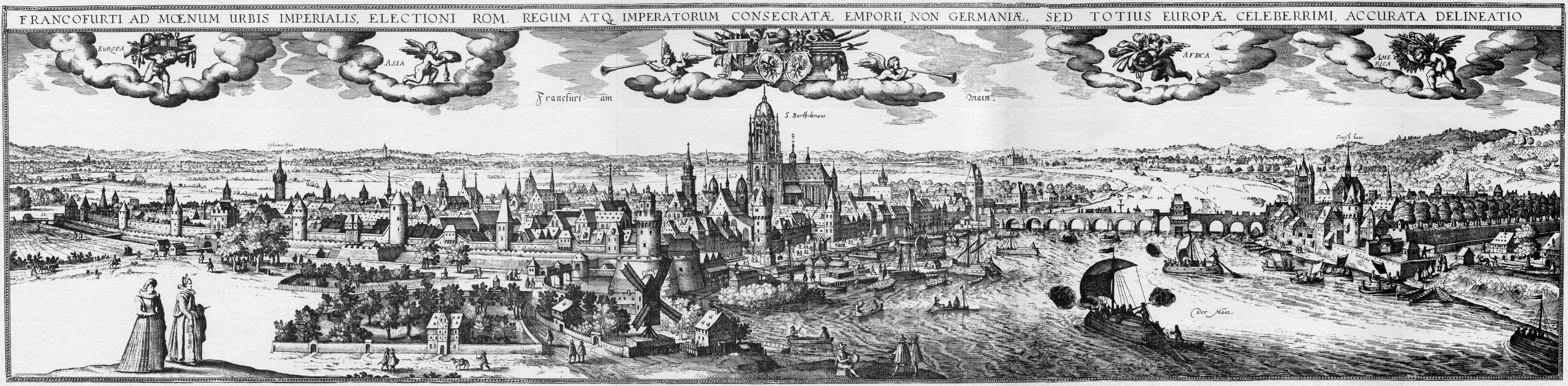
Frankfurt, seen from south west. On the right side: Alte Brücke, about 1617/18, before 1619. (Chalcography by Matthäus Merian d. Ä.)

In the Thirty Years' War, as well, the bridge had been the stage of a shooting war. In August 1635, imperial troops attacked Swedes who had occupied Sachsenhausen and entrenched themselves in the bridge mill as well as in the Sachsenhausen bridge tower. During the fight, the bridge mill caught fire. It was later replaced by two new buildings.

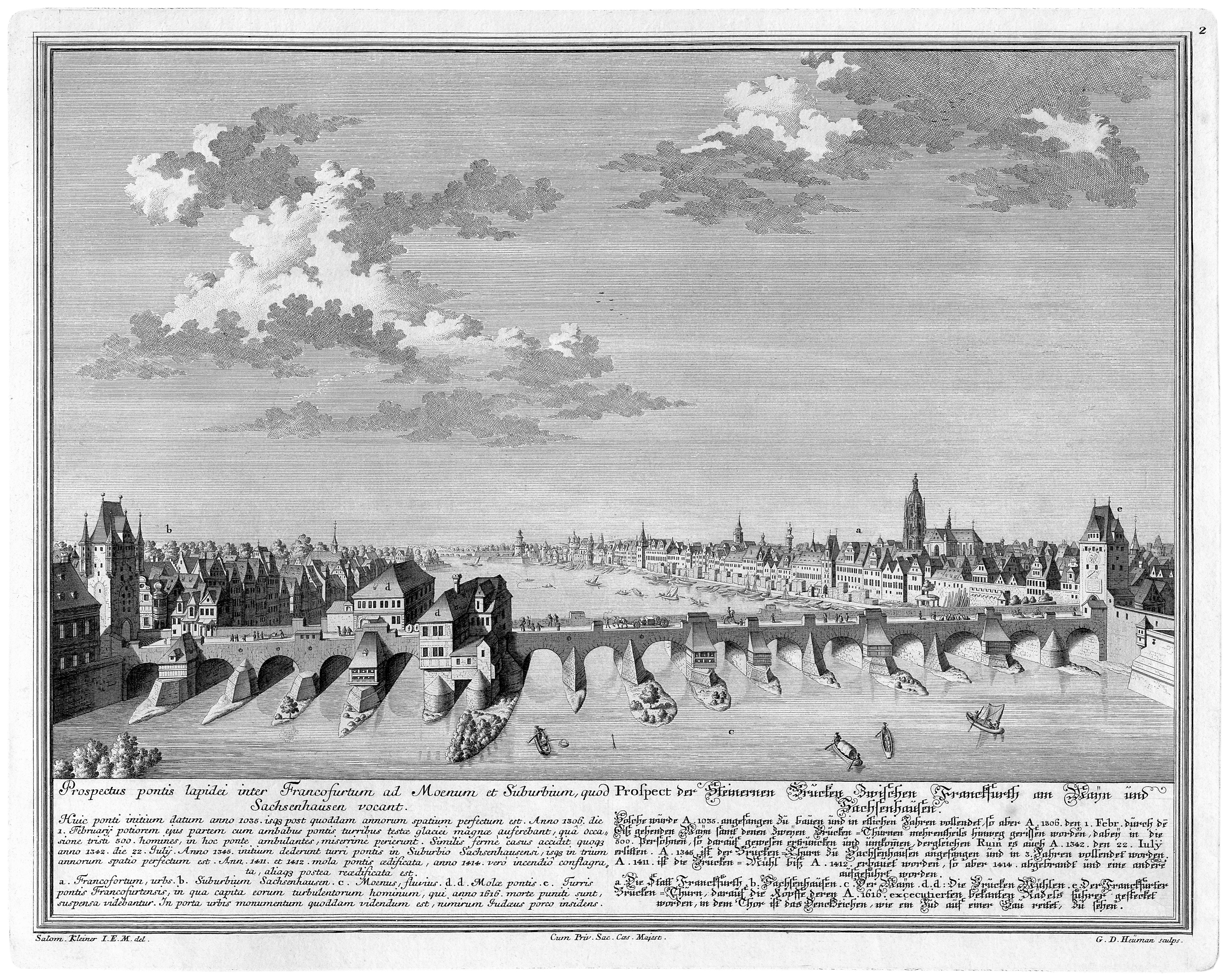
The Alte Brücke before its reconstruction in the 18th century, seen towards the West, 1728 (copperplate engraving by Georg Daniel Heumann based on a drawing by Salomon Kleiner)

At the end of the 17th, and at the beginning of the 18th century, the material condition of the bridge became increasingly worse over time. Again and again, floods and melted ice hit the bridge and damaged it, and repair attempts did not completely fix the problems. In 1739, the council mandated that the bridge must not be burdened with more than 50 hundredweight at a time. This measure did not prevent a collapse of the bridge's cross arch on 16 December 1739, which also caused the Brickegickel to be lost. The two adjacent arches, the "Flößerbogen" and the "Ausschüttbogen", used to toss garbage into the Main, have also been severely damaged.

The council then decided to completely rebuild the bridge. The construction was to be managed by Johann Friedrich von Uffenbach. Firstly, a temporary wooden bridge was created, which stood in good stead during the coronation of emperor Charles VII. The foundation for the new stone bridge was laid on 18 September 1741; the keystone was set on 14 September 1744. In 1748, the bridge was paved; afterwards, it received a representative sandstone parapet. The portals on the path down to the Main island have been decorated by sandstone reliefs of the river god Moenus, and by two Kanonesteppels, a caricaturesque depiction of two artillerists. The relief was lost in World War II.

On 27 February 1784, the bridge was again damaged by melted ice.

During the War of the Sixth Coalition, on 31 October 1813, French troops, supposed to be defending the city, engaged in a violent battle against Bavarian and Austrian soldiers, who approached the bridge from Sachsenhausen. Again, both bridge mills became victims of the flames. The French troops were forced to retreat, but managed to escape from being chased by the allied troops by removing the wooden bars over the two middle bridge arches, rendering the bridge impassable one more time. In 1840, the bridge arches were finally connected by stones.

=== 19th century ===
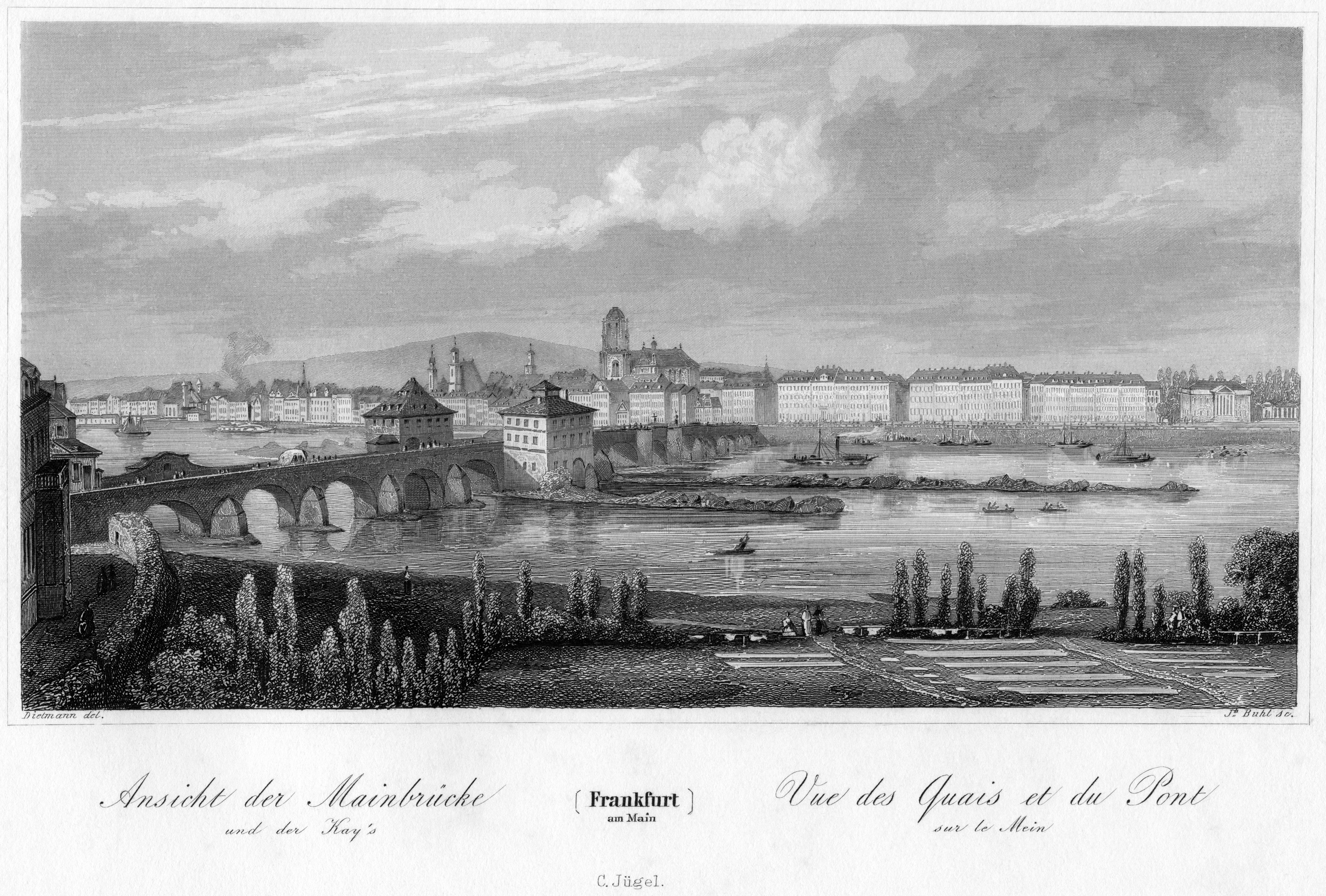
Alte Brücke, 1845 (steel engraving by Jakob Ludwig August Buhl after a draft by Jakob Fürchtegott Dielmann)

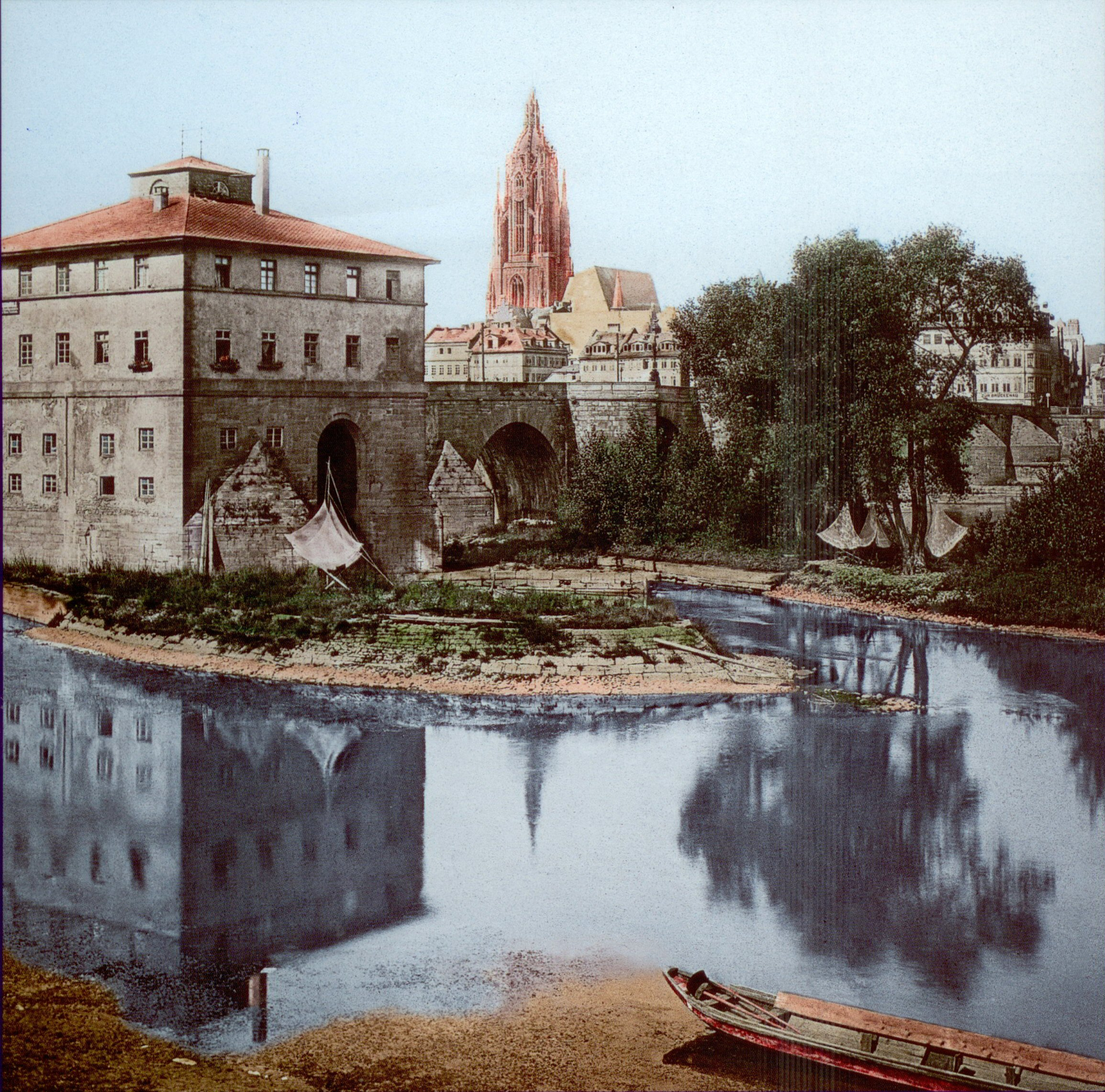
Alte Brücke around 1885

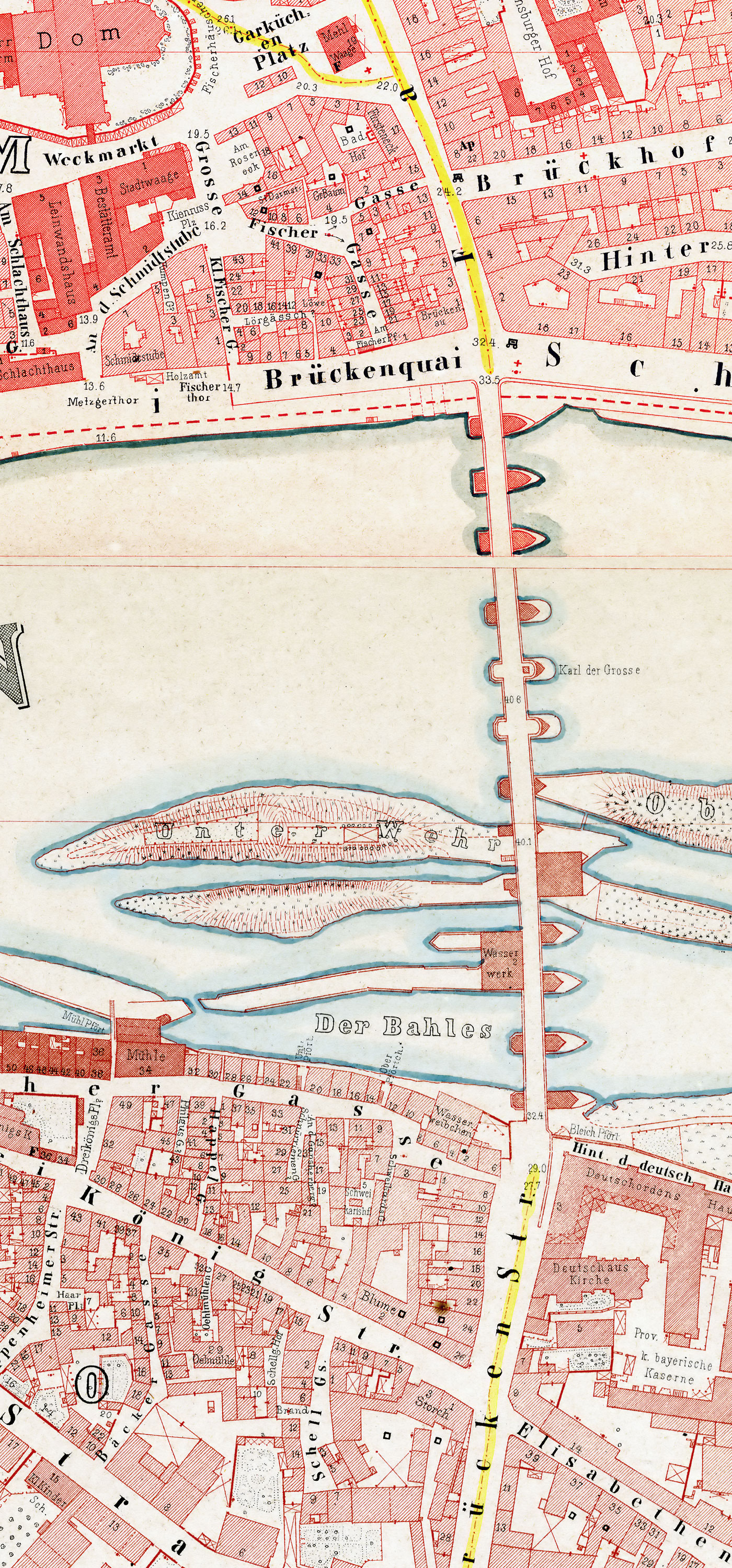
Alte Brücke on the Ravenstein plan, 1861

Unchanged by the rebuilding, the bridge still had a disadvantageous proportion of the opening width of the arches (172.17 m) compared to the complete bridge length of 264.87 metres. This caused ice jams upstream of the bridge in almost every winter. As an attempt to solve the problem, ice breakers had been added to the bridge pillars, but these turned out to be a collision danger for passing ships and were subsequently removed. Further complicating the situation, the small, long arch passages stood slightly angular to the direction of the water current, causing strong turbulences. Kolks and underminings lead to recurring damage to the bridge. Reports of the city construction manager Johann Friedrich Christian Hess from the years 1816 to 1844 noted the desolate state of the bridge pillars, and mentioned cracks with sizes up to 10 inches (0.25 m) each. Maintenance attempts of the persistently damaged bridge in the years 1825 to 1859 caused construction costs of about 230,000 Guilders.

In 1848, a second bridge, the Main-Neckar Railway, was built over the Main. In 1869, the "Eiserner Steg", a pedestrian bridge, followed. Nevertheless, the Main bridge, now called the "Alte Brücke" (old bridge), turned out to be unsuitable to meet the rising demand caused by increasing amounts of street traffic. Since 1859, there had been plans to increase the width of the bridge. In 1865, first plans for a complete reconstruction with 8 instead of 13 arches, and a bridge width of 14 m, have been made. These plans even included a possible removal of the Main island.

When the Free City of Frankfurt was annexed by Preußen in 1866, the bridge became property of the Prussian state. The reconstruction plans were temporarily paused; instead of a reconstruction of the Alte Brücke, new two bridges were built: The "Untermainbrücke", downstream, in 1874 and the "Obermainbrücke", upstream, in 1878. The latter bridge is named "Ignatz-Bubis-Brücke" as of today. In the 1880s, the Main was channelized, increasing the water level by about two metres. Between 1908 and 1910, the "Osthafen" (east harbour) emerged. Now, at the latest, the Alte Brücke had become a traffic impediment for the number of ships passing through the bridge.

Encouraged by a consortium from Offenbach, consisting of Weintraut (Councillor of Commerce), Weymann (banker) and the Merzbach Bank, a tram way was built. The construction was finished by the Frankfurt-Offenbacher Trambahn-Gesellschaft (FOTG) on 18 February 1884, and the route went from Alte Brücke (Sachsenhausen) to the "Buchrainstraße" in Oberrad. It was the first commercially maintained, public electrical tramway in Germany. About two months later, on 10 April 1884, the tramway was extended up to the "Mathildenplatz" in Offenbach. Back then, the FOTG used a track gauge of 1000 mm ("Metre-gauge railway").

=== 20th century: the "new old bridge" ===
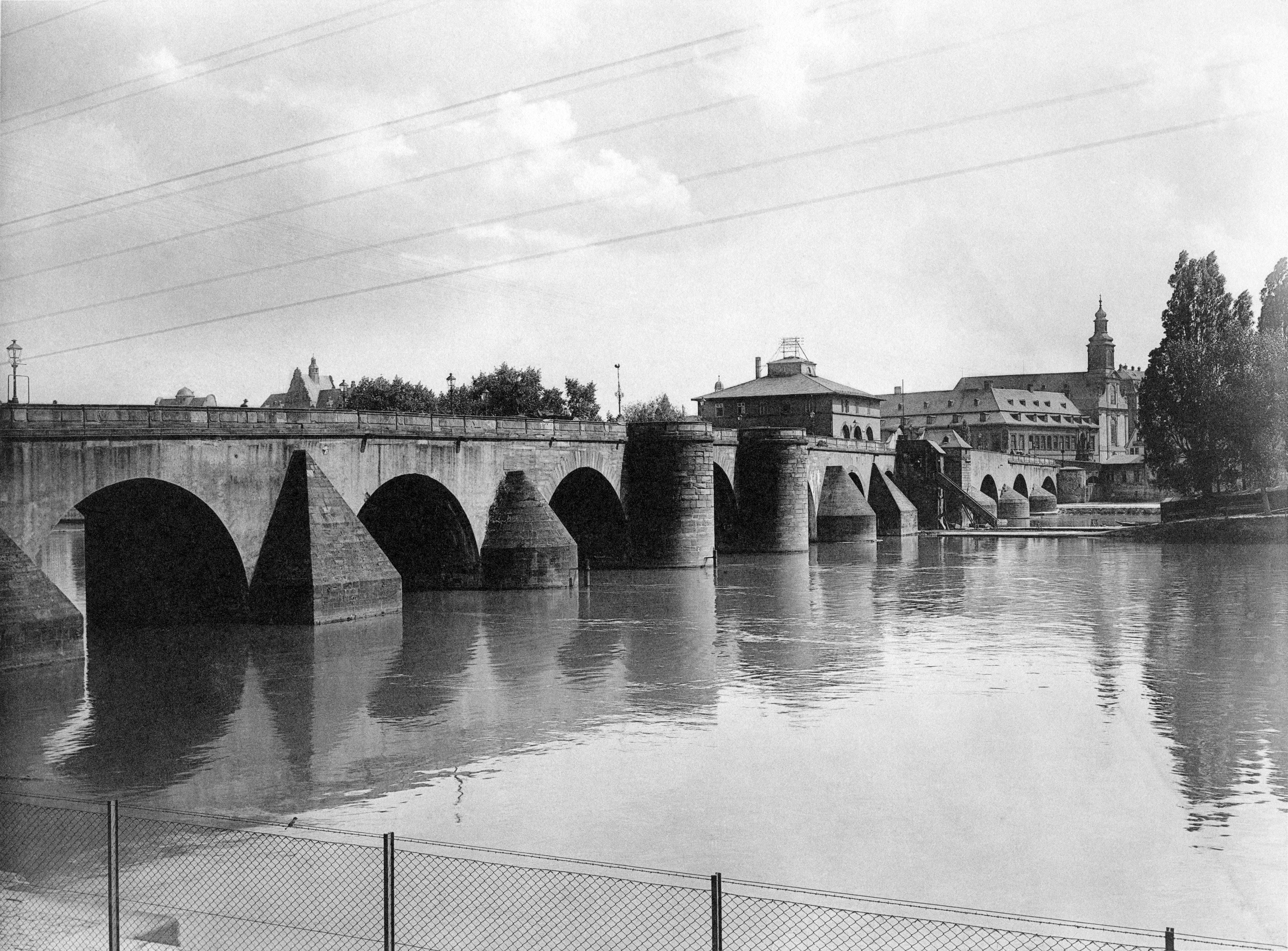
The Alte Brücke, seen from the Main wharf, around 1911 (photo by Carl Friedrich Fay)

In 1909, the Highways Department of Frankfurt composed a memorandum, summarizing the fundamental points for a reconstruction of the bridge: Reconstruction in the same place, without removing the Main island, and constructed using red sandstone taken from the river.

In 1911, an Architectural design competition was announced. One of the participants had been the architect community Franz von Hoven & Hermann von Hoven; winners of the competition have been Franz Heberer and Carl Friedrich Wilhelm Leonhardt. On 23 May 1912, on the Main island, the foundation stone for the reconstruction has been laid. The bridge was supposed to have a width of 14 metres, and it was planned to have 8 stone arches.

In spring of 1914, a temporary replacement bridge was acquired from Dresden. Over a length of 279 metres, with 15 wooden bridge pillars, this replacement bridge crossed the Main at the west side of the old bridge. On 3 July, the Alte Brücke was closed for street traffic, and the demolition followed immediately. The names of the two last Frankfurt citizens crossing the bridge are known: Mr. Heymann from the "Heidestraße", and innkeeper Effelsberger from the "Alter Markt" (old market). This event concluded the centuries-old history of the bridge.

The construction work on the new bridge, which the city council conference decided to name Kaiserbrücke (emperor bridge), started 1915 on the Sachsenhausen side of the bridge with two piers over the Müllermain. However, affected by World War I, the work came to a standstill. On 22 January 1924, the temporary replacement bridge was ripped away by strong molten ice. Subsequently, the city founded a bridge construction society, with lord mayor Georg Voigt as chairman. In June 1924, construction work was resumed; the bridge was now supposed to be called "Neue Alte Brücke" ("new old bridge"), and it was planned to have a width of 19 metres. To implement this, the already existing bridge pillars had to be laboriously relocated. In December 1925, the construction work had to be interrupted again because of melting ice. On 15 August 1926, the "Neue Alte Brücke" could finally be opened by Lord Mayor Ludwig Landmann. In the course of the inauguration of the bridge, on 15 August 1926, Franz Heberer spoke in the name of the architects:

"Now you are completed, bridge / after long severe suffering. / Now, too, bring Frankfurt honor and fortune / Until the furthest time."
German: Nun biste fertig, Brick, / nach langem schweren Leide. / Jetzt bring aach Frankfurt Ehr' und Glick / Bis in die fernste Zeite.

The finished bridge had a length of 237.40 metres and a width of 19.5 metres, 11 of which were reserved for the road, and 4 on each side for the sidewalks. The eight arches of the bridge, five over the main river, one on the Main island, and two over the Müllermain, had differing widths. The two middle arches had been the widest, with a width of 29.5 metres each. This construction design was a tradeoff between modern traffic capacity and the traditional looks of the bridge.

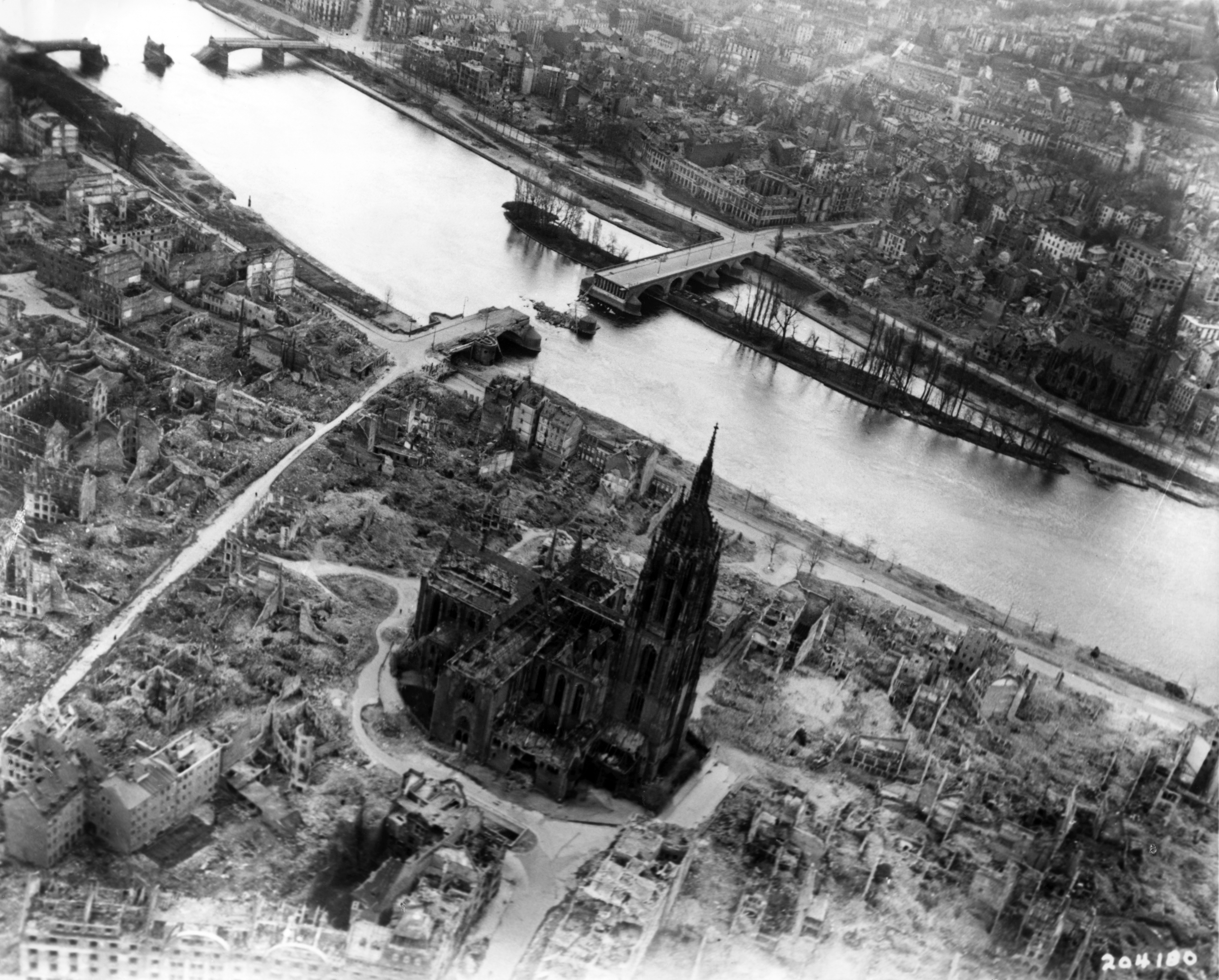
Aerial view of the Alte Brücke after its destruction by German soldiers in 1945

The Neue Alte Brücke only reached an age of 18 years: On 26 March 1945, shortly before the end of World War II, the German Wehrmacht imploded the two large middle arches of the bridge to prevent the approaching Allies from crossing the Main. This did not turn out to be a successful strategy: Within the next three days, soldiers of the United States Army occupied the whole city.

Already in the same year, at the end of 1945, a reconstruction of the Alte Brücke was initiated, this time without the naming attribute "Neue" ("new"). Out of tank armor plates and other war material, a steel middle part was created for the bridge. It had a maximum load rating of about 24 metric tons. This construction was supported by a broad steel pillar. On 13 September 1947, the Alte Brücke was opened for street traffic again, as the second Main bridge of Frankfurt, after the "Eiserner Steg".

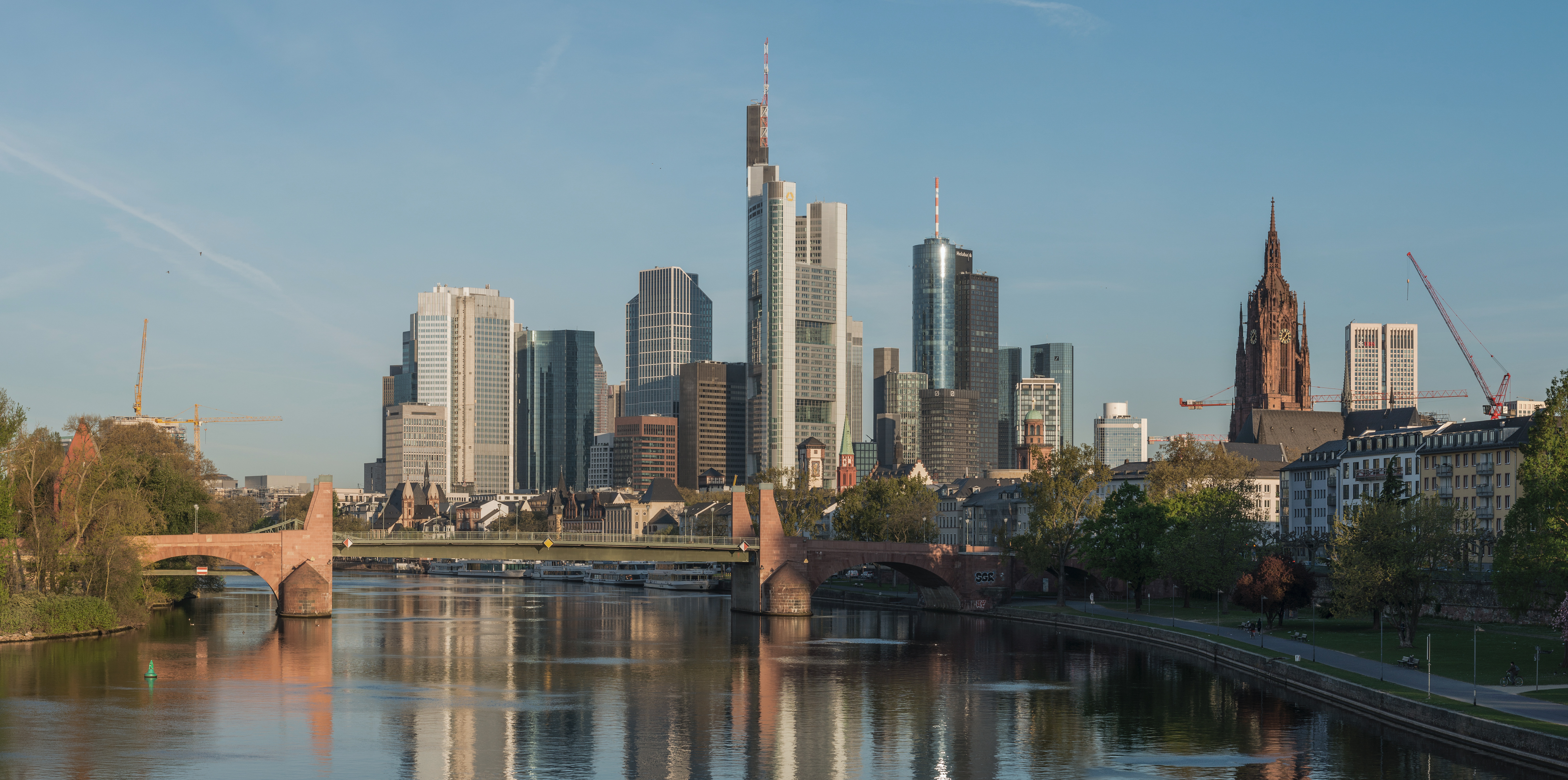
The two middle arches had been imploded in 1945...

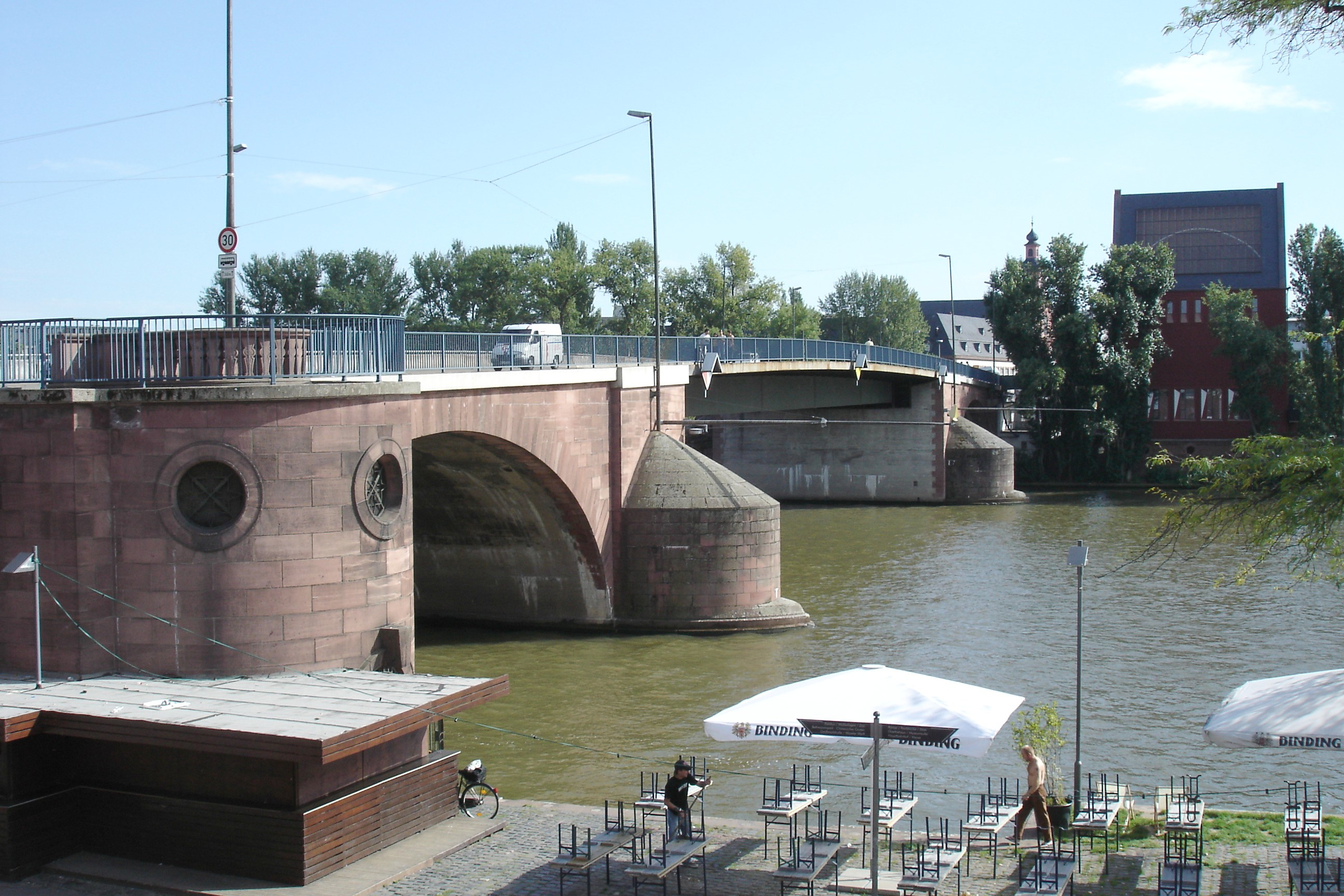
...and have been replaced by a steel part in 1965.

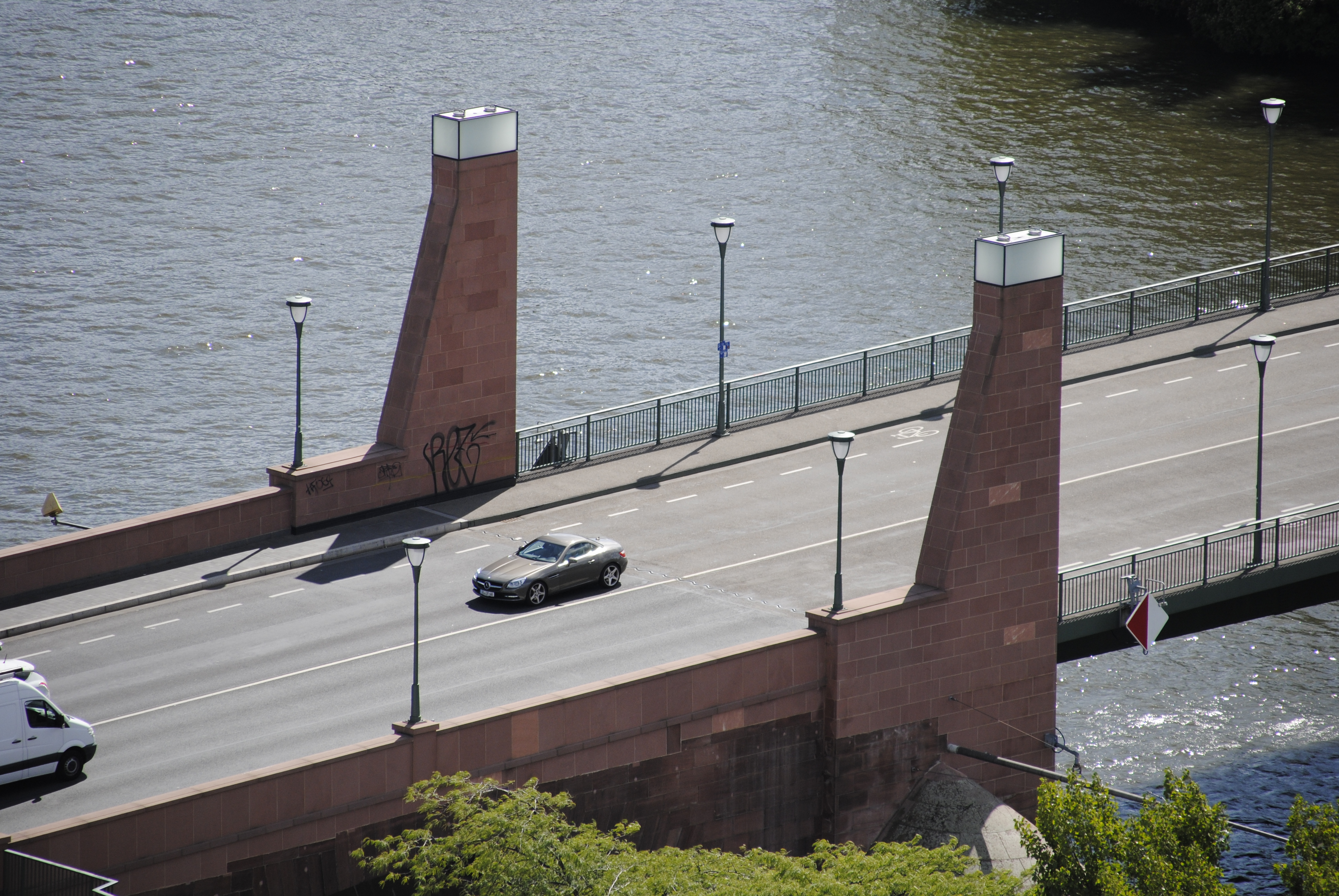
Detail view of the Alte Brücke with new parapets made of sandstone

Because the provisional middle part of the bridge was only wide enough for two road lanes, a complete reconstruction of the bridge was soon planned. However, this reconstruction did not happen because of a hefty cost estimation. For this reason, in the middle of the 1960s, it was decided to renovate the bridge instead of completely reconstructing it, hoping to bring an end to the increasing traffic obstructions. Especially since the construction of the wide Kurt-Schumacher-Straße (Kurt Schumacher road), which today is the northern access-road to the bridge, there had often been traffic jams from the bridge up to the inner city. In 1964, to release the traffic burden from Alte Brücke, another bridge was built: The Flößerbrücke was constructed, east of the Obermainbrücke. Then, on 1 June 1965, the Alte Brücke was closed. Two new bridge parts, each about 70 metres long and 10 metres wide, were brought via ship between the old main pillars of the bridge. Because of the upcoming International Motor Show, the construction work was finished in record time, allowing a reopening just in time on 16 September 1965. The bridge has five road lanes since this day, and there are currently about 29,000 cars traversing the bridge daily.

In 1996, all the damage to the Alte Brücke that had accumulated over time was repaired in a makeshift. In December 2000, the city countil conference mandated a fundamental renovation of the whole bridge. The correlated architect competition of 2001 was won by Christoph Mäckler, with a design proposal that emphasized the historical elements of the bridge. In 2004, the city countil conference decided to let the renovation start shortly after the 2006 FIFA World Cup. However, the construction work was delayed to be synchronized with the reconstruction of the Kurt-Schumacher-Straße (Kurt Schumacher road), avoiding prolonged interference with private transport in the inner city. For some time, the beginning of the work was planned to be in the middle of 2009; the building costs have been estimated in the 2008 city budget plan to be about 29 million Euro.

Because the Alte Brücke constitutes the most used bus path of the city, the road was supposed to be prepared for an implementation of tram tracks, to create a tram connection between the Konstablerwache and Sachsenhausen. The existing five traffic lanes, including the turning lanes, were supposed to be preserved, and the bridge was planned to receive separate pedestrian and bicycle paths on both sides. To be able to implement these plans, however, the bridge would have been needed to be broadened. Because in 2013, two kilometres east of the Alte Brücke, another bridge over the Main was planned to be opened, the city parliament decided not to widen the Alte Brücke. Instead, it was decided only to renovate the already existing state of the bridge, for a relatively cheap 4.5 million Euro. The renovation works happened between June and December 2014. In favor of the pedestrian and bicycle paths, the middle fifth lane for left-turning drivers was waived. The bridge received new parapets made of sandstone, and a new lighting equipment.

== Development of the Main island and the Müllermain ==
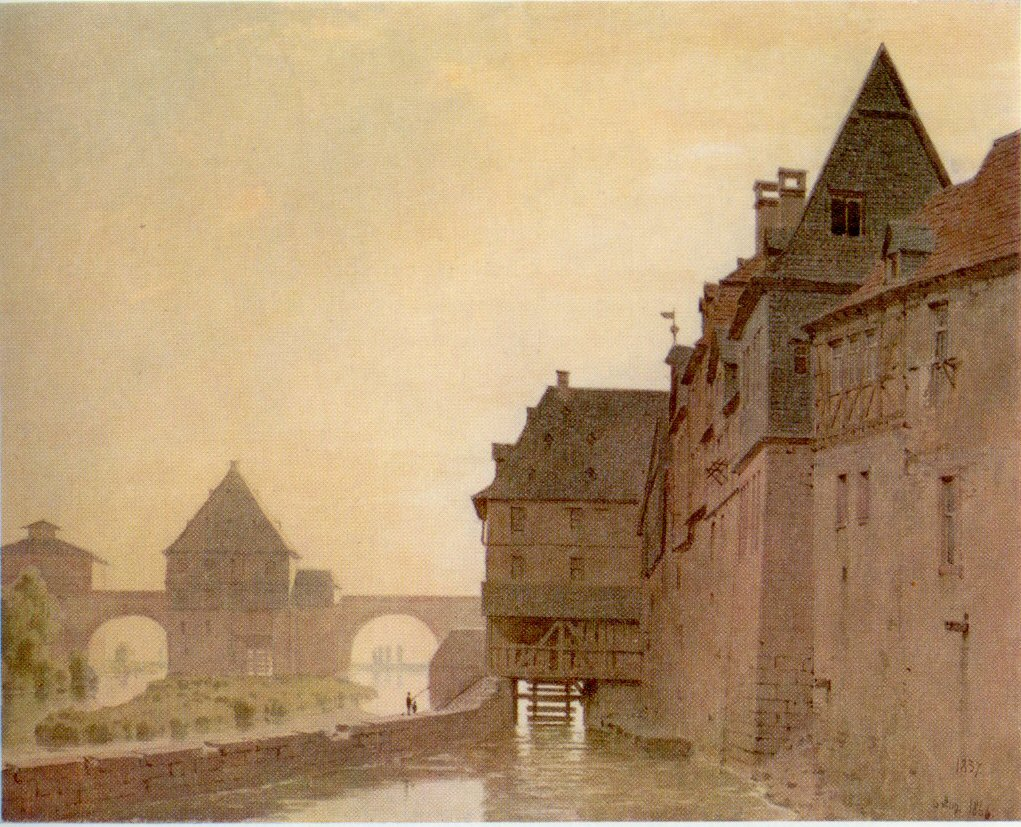
"Der Müllermain", aquarelle painting by Carl Theodor Reiffenstein

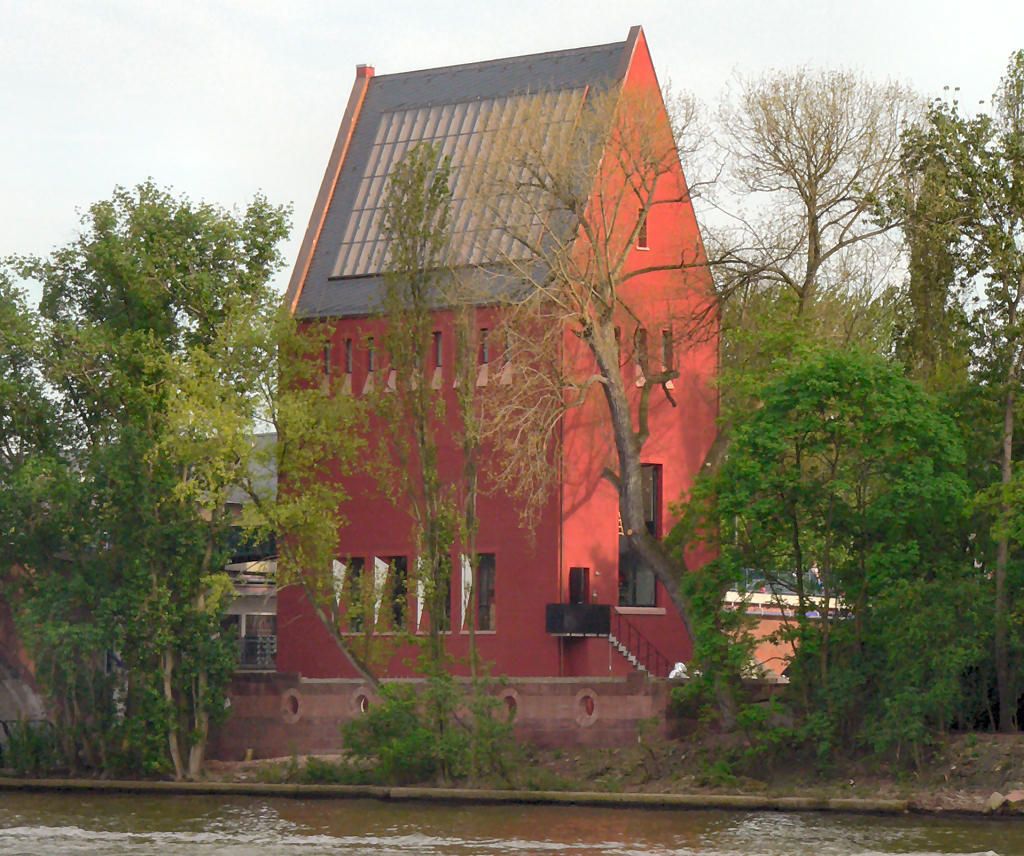
New "Portikus" (porticus) on the Main island

A noteworthy feature of the Alte Brücke is the Main island, the shape of which has varied over time. On older plans, for example on the plan of Matthäus Merian from 1628, three smaller islands can be seen above the Alte Brücke, while there is only a shoal visible in the river below the bridge. On city maps of the 18th century, these islands had mostly disappeared. Only in the 19th century, again, on pictures and plans, an island can be seen that is crossed by multiple small canals, sources and drains of the bridge mills.

Back then, the Sachsenhausen Main riverside was located considerably more in the south than it is today. The about 20 metres wide upper wharf at the riverside road, and the 23 metres wide lower wharf had not been created before 1880; until then, the Main river reached up to the front of the first houses. Upside of the bridge, the Sachsenhausen city wall touched the river. The river branch between the island and the Sachsenhausen riverside are called "Müllermain" ("miller Main") today, because it carried the river water to the two bridge mills and the Sachsenhausen Mill in the south.

In the course of the construction of the Neue Alte Brücke ("new old bridge"), the Main island has been consolidated as well. Today, it has a length of about 300 metres, and a width of about 30 metres, and is separated by the bridge in an upper island and a lower island. The area is densely vegetated with populars and willows, and it constitutes a breeding habitat for numerous aquatic birds. Furthermore, it is an important resting place for migratory birds. For these reasons, the island is not open to the public. It is not legally designated as a nature conservation area, but the municipal authorities of Frankfurt have pledged on 23 June 1977 to treat it like a nature conservation area.

The narrow Müllermain is closed to normal ship traffic because of its low water depth. Some floating jetties exist, only for sport boats.

On the Main island, between 2005 and 2006, an exhibition hall for contemporary art, called "Neuer Portikus" ("new porticus"), was constructed on the west side of the bridge. The solid brick building with a steep gable roof and a pointed gable towards the bridge has been designed by Christoph Mäckler, who also created the 2014 renovation plan for the Alte Brücke. The building name "Neuer Portikus" is derived from the porticus in front of the old city library at the Obermainbrücke ("upper Main bridge"). At this place, in a hall, art has been exhibited until the library was rebuilt from 2003 to 2005.

East of the Alte Brücke, architect Mäckler had conceptualized another building, with a height of 30 metres. It was supposed to have a passageway at the bottom, for members of the rowing club, and it was planned to include a restaurant and four freehold flats above. This project was disputed, however, because it would have bulldozed a nearly untouched natural area in the middle of the city, and because it would have endangered multiple trees and a breeding site of numerous birds. Furthermore, according to a citizens' initiative, the initially meant not-for-profit project had become a "private investors' dream" with construction costs of 4 million Euro. After the citizens' initiative had collected over 6,000 signatures and multiple opposition factions had filed motions against the construction, the governing parties CDU und Alliance 90/The Greens released a joint press statement against the project, bringing the issue off the table.

== Structures on the Alte Brücke ==
=== Bridge towers ===
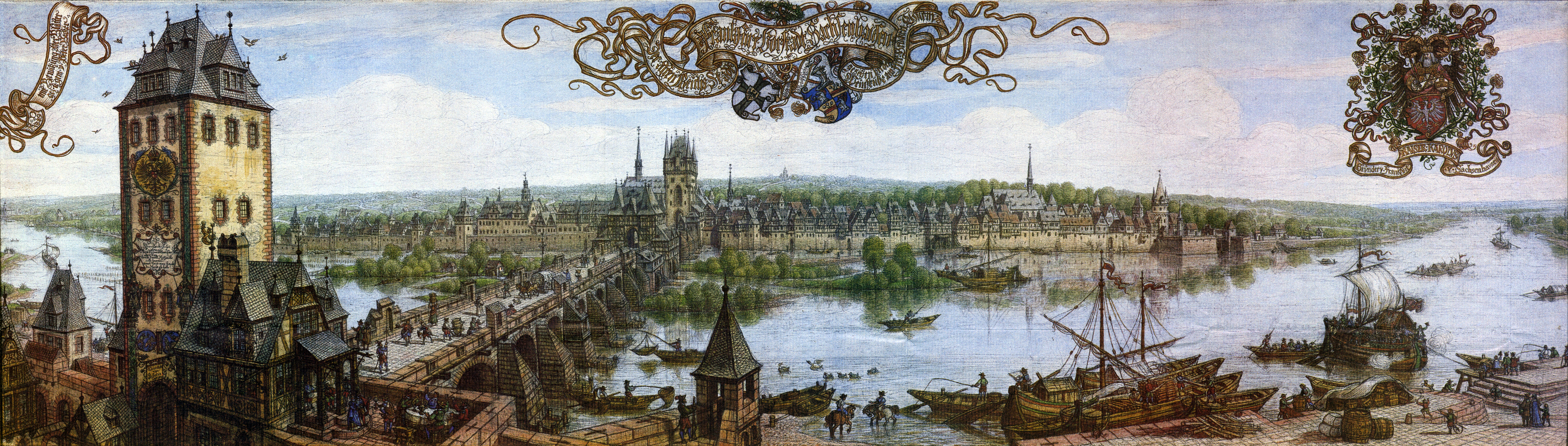
The bridge towers, in the early 17th century. Aquarelle painting by Peter Becker, 1889

The two bridge towers are mentioned the first time in historical documents of 1306, when the towers had been destroyed by flood and melting ice. In 1342, the Sachsenhausen tower became a victim of flood again, but was reconstructed promptly. Its attic was decorated with five small towerlets. In 1729, it received a turret clock.

The Frankfurt bridge tower was decorated with plentiful paintings: In 1392, the passageway was painted with a fresco of Jesus' passion; around 1500, the city council decided to supplement it with a so-called Judensau. Despite protests by the Jewish community, this testimony of public antisemitism stayed in place until the tower was demolished; it even was renewed multiple times.

On the south side (the bridge side), since 1502, the tower facade bore a sundial and a Reichsadler; on the north side (the city side) it showed an eagle. The same situation has been preserved until today on the Eschenheimer Turm. In 1610, painter Philipp Uffenbach added an illustration of the "Brückenfreiheit" ("bridge freedom").

The gates of the bridge towers were closed at night, preventing anyone from passing the bridge during the night.

Because the Frankfurt bridge tower was constructed earlier than the other tower, it was also called the Alter Brückenturm ("old bridge tower"). It served as a dungeon, and in 1693 the torture infrastructure was moved from the "Katharinenpforte" to this tower. In 1616, the heads of Vincenz Fettmilch and three other leaders of the Fettmilch uprising were exhibited at the south side of the tower. Johann Wolfgang von Goethe reported in "Dichtung und Wahrheit" that these heads still hung there 150 years later. One of the heads even persisted until the final deconstruction of the tower in 1801. The Sachsenhausen bridge tower had already been demolished in 1769. Following its example, the large townhall tower, the "Langer Franz" ("tall Franz") was constructed at the beginning of the 20th century.

=== Bridge mills ===
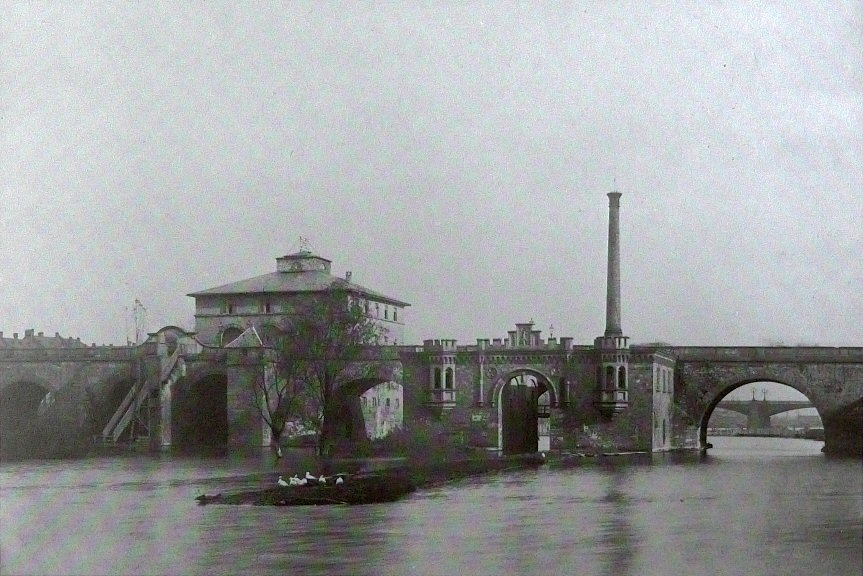
Pumping station on the Alte Brücke (1882)

In 1411, the first mill was constructed on the bridge. It was by far the largest and most significant mill of Frankfurt. During the previously mentioned combat in 1635 between Swedish and Imperial troops, the mill was destroyed. In its place, two slightly smaller mills were constructed: One to the west, in Sachsenhausen's direction, and one to the east, towards Frankfurt. These mills, too, had to be reconstructed multiple times, for example after a lightning strike-induced fire in 1718. In 1852, the westerly mill was torn down, and at the same position, a steam engine pumping station was constructed from 1856 to 1858 to provide Main water for the Sachsenhausen horticulture. Already in 1890, the pumping station was put out of service and deconstructed. The eastern mill stood until 1914, then it was demolished together with the whole bridge. Two citizens had been born inside the mills; they have been called Gickelbürger ("rooster citizens", see below).

=== Chapel of St. Catherine ===
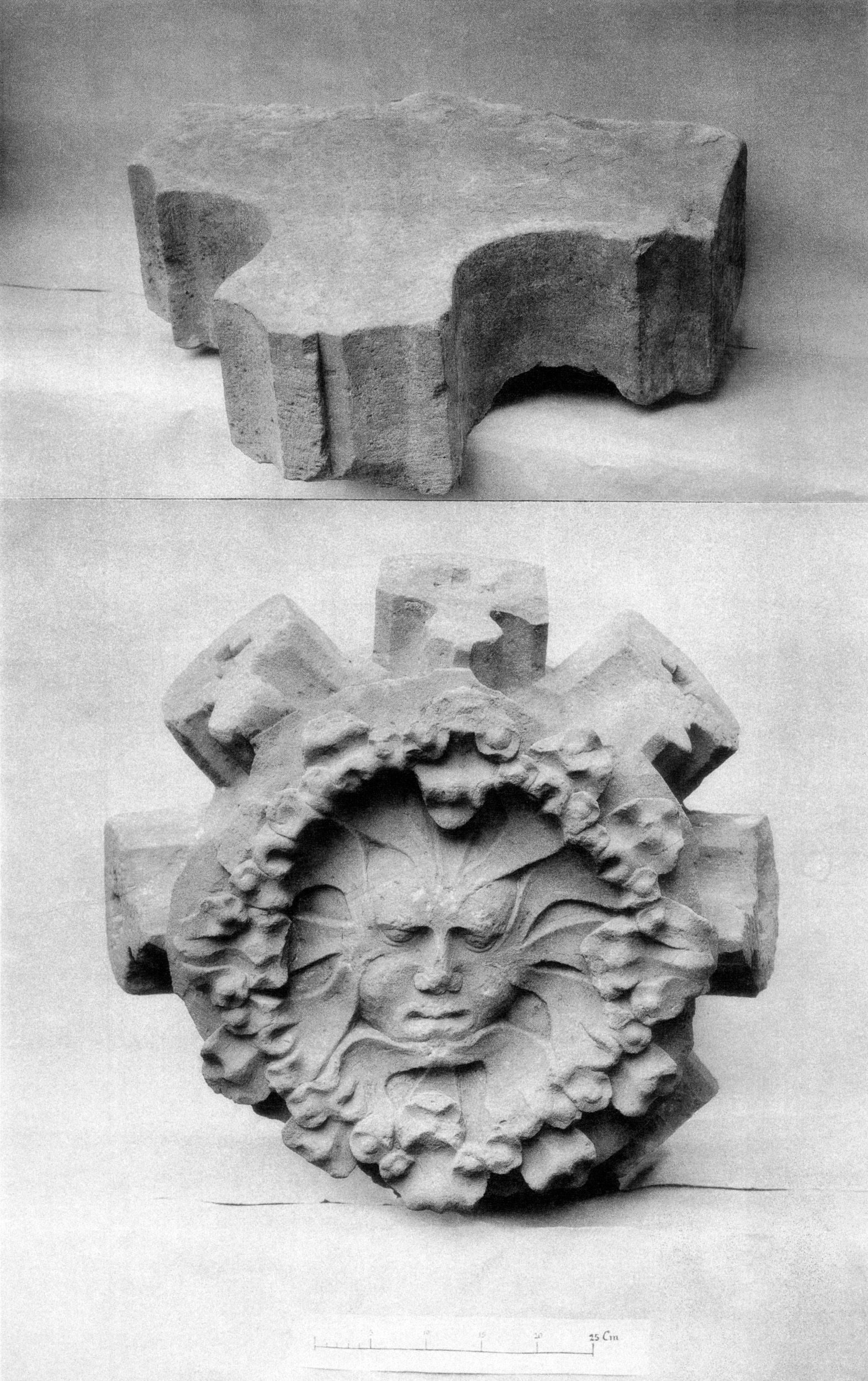
Parts of St. Catherine's Church, salvaged 1866 and 1878, photo from 1880

Already in the beginning of the 14th century, there was a small chapel on the bridge, probably built of wood, which was destroyed by the 1306 flood. In 1322, Albrecht von der Hofstatt mentioned a "new chapel" at the Sachsenhausen bridge tower in his testament. Not before 1338, the beautiful and richly decorated chapel was finished, and consecrated to Catherine of Alexandria, patron saint of the mariners, on 27 September 1338. Only four years later, in 1342, the chapel was destroyed by St. Mary Magdalene's flood and was not reconstructed. A few years later, Patrician Wicker Frosch donated Katharinenkirche to the Innenstadt. In 1866 and 1878, during construction works, well-preserved remains of this chapel have actually been found at the place described by the written historical sources.

=== Other structures ===
The Rattenhäuschen ("rat cottage") existed between 1499 and 1569 on a pillar on the east side of the bridge. In the 15th century, rats had grown out of control in the city. The warden in the Rattenhäuschen, named the "Rattenmesser" ("rat cutter"), paid one Heller for every killed rat, cut off its tail as a kind of receipt, and threw the rest of the body into the Main. To finance this project, the punitive damages that Jews had to pay for crossing the bridge were used. However, this did apparently cause some citizens to start breeding rats as an unconventional income method, and the rat house was repurposed as a powder magazine in 1569.

On the west side of the bridge, north of the non-vaulted pillar, two public convenience stations called the "Heimliche Gemache" ("hidden chambers") existed for men and women; they have been mentioned in historical documents back to the 15th century and had been donated by the city council.

During the course of the 19th century, Rowing became a popular sport. With the "Frankfurter Ruder-Verein von 1865" ("Frankfurt rowing club of 1865"), the first rowing community in German midland was founded on 28 July 1865. Beginning in 1871, they hosted the first international Regatta on the Main. Since then the club has also had a presence on the Main island. The boathouse between two pillars of the Alte Brücke has been constructed in its current form in 1948.

=== Charlemagne statue ===
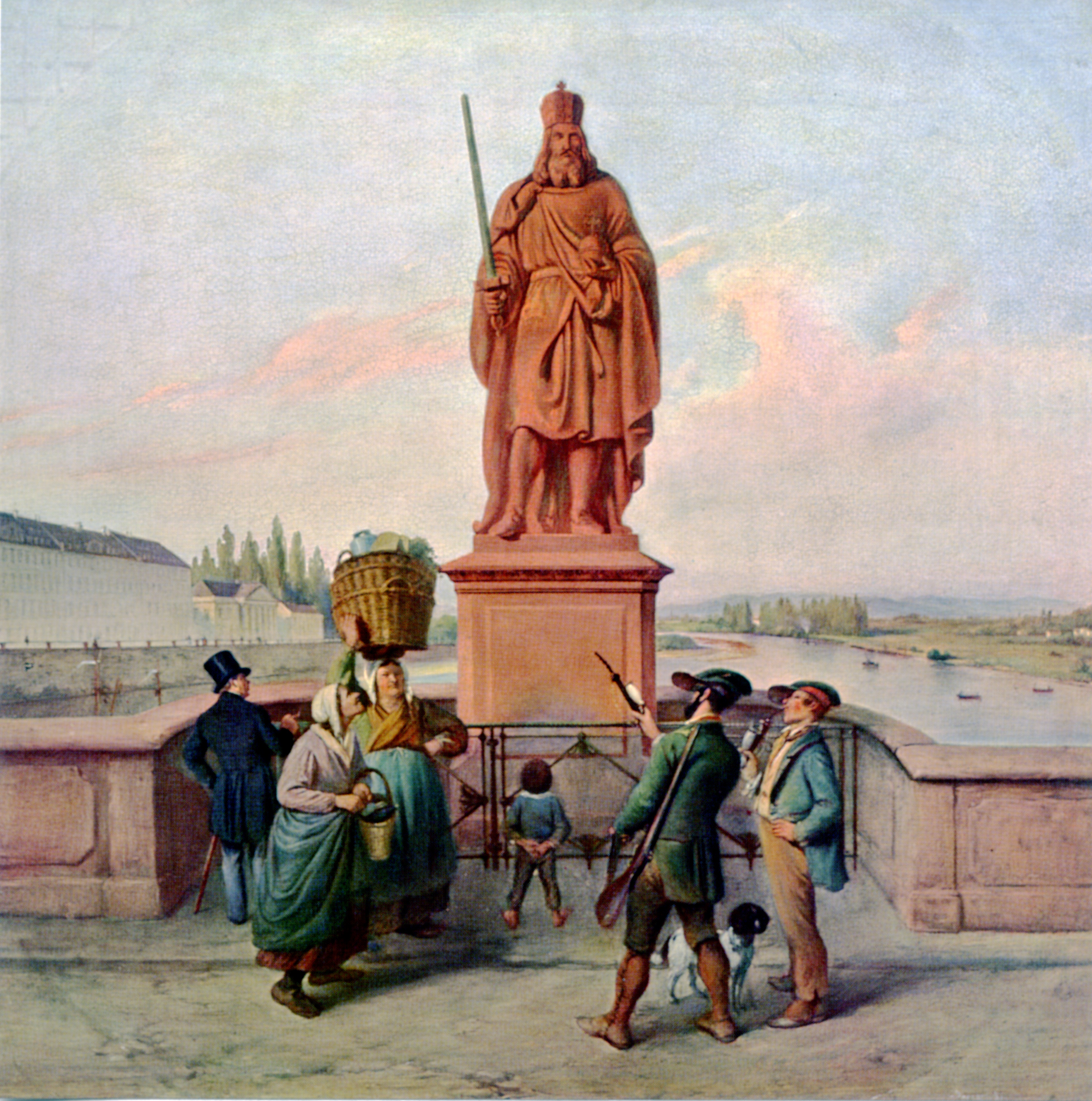
Statue of Charlemagne on the Alte Brücke. Painting by Jakob Fürchtegott Dielmann, around 1845

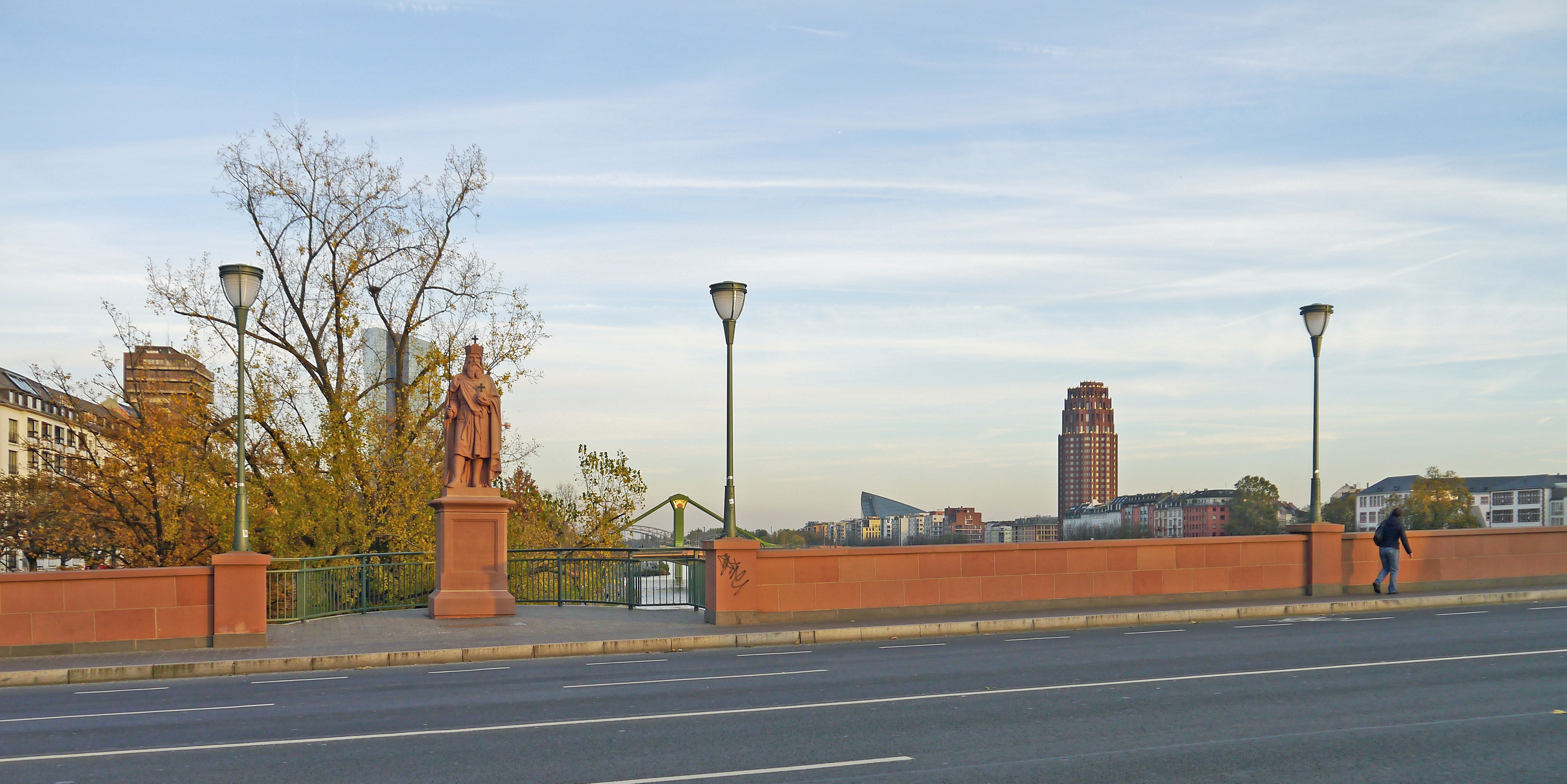
Statue of Charlemagne, 2016

On 23 August 1843, the thousandth commemoration day of the Verdun Treaty, the Städel Museum (city museum) donated a statue of Charlemagne to the city. The sculpture, made of red sandstone by sculptor Johann Nepomuk Zwerger, was deployed at the eastern middle pillar of the bridge, facing the city. In the progress of deconstructing the Alte Brücke in 1914, this statue was moved to the yard of the Historical Museum of Frankfurt. During the bombing of Frankfurt in World War II, the statue has been severely damaged; the head and the hands of the statue have been destroyed. In 1986, it was repositioned in front of the entrance of the historical museum in Römerberg, after sculptor Edwin Hüller had restored head and hands of the statue. In 2011, the museum in Römerberg was deconstructed to be re-built, and the sculpture was moved to a depot. During discussions in Frankfurt to extend and renovate the Alte Brücke, the citizens expressed the wish to re-situate the Charlemagne statue in its original place on the bridge. Because the financial situation of the city did not allow such a project at that time, a society named Brückenbauverein Frankfurt e.V. ("bridge building club of Frankfurt, registered society") was founded in 2006, under the lead of architect Christoph Mäckler. In the end of 2014, the city community council decided to leave the original in the new museum building in Römerberg, and to put up a copy on the Alte Brücke, exactly where the "Brickegickel" had been located from 1967 to 2013. On 1 October 2016, mayor Feldmann inaugurated the memorial.

=== Brickegickel ===
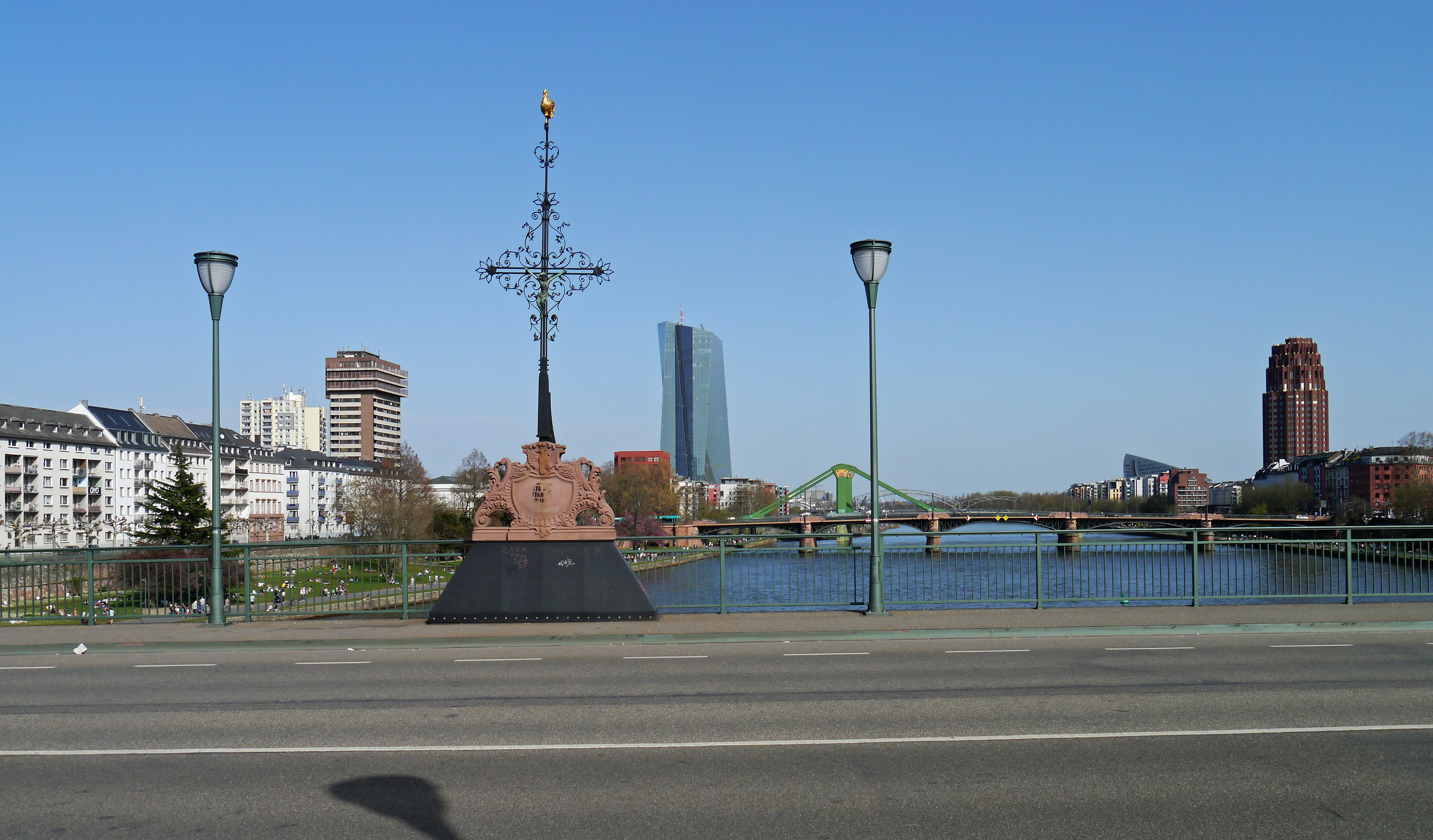
Red sandstone base, crucifix and Brickegickel, 2018

The "Brickegickel" ("bridge rooster") is inseparably linked to the history of the Alte Brücke. In 1401, a crucifix was constructed deployed on the middle arch of the bridge, the cross arch, to mark the position of the deepest point in the waterway. At top of the crucifix, there was a golden rooster, as a symbol for vigilance, and also as a symbol for the remorse about the betrayal of Saint Peter to his Lord Jesus. The rooster was supposed to remind mariners to be cautious when steering their riverboat through the strong current below the narrow bridge arch. Also, at this place, for many centuries, executions had been performed. When the last glimpse of the condemned person faced the Brickegickel, the rooster reminded them of Receptance, while the crucifix promised divine grace and forgiveness of their sins.

Five times, the Brickegickel had to be replaced during the course of the centuries:

- The first one already sank in the Main during a hefty windstorm in 1434.
- The second one was shot down by Swedish troops in 1635, during the Thirty Years' War. It had already been damaged during the besiegement of Frankfurt in the Fürstenkrieg ("prince war") in 1552.
- The third one sank on 16 December 1739 when the bridge collapsed in a flood. It has never been found again.
- The fourth one was created with a Rococo design, with a sandstone base and a metalsmith decorated crucifix, in 1750. It stood there until the Alte Brücke was demolished in 1914, and it was placed on the "new old bridge" between 1926 and 1945. During World War II, on 26 March 1945, two arches of the bridge have been imploded by the Wehrmacht, to prevent US-American soldiers from marching over the bridge into the city. This implosion destroyed the base and crucifix, and the Brickegickel fell into the Main. It has been salvaged and displayed in the Historical Museum afterwards. Closer examination of the object showed that the Brickegickel had been perforated by multiple gunshots, likely on 31 October 1813, when French and Bavarian troops had a firefight over the bridge.
- The fifth Brickegickel has been created with faithful reproductions of the destroyed sandstone base and the crucifix, on 7 December 1967, on the renovated Alte Brücke.
- The sixth, current, Brickegickel was built in September 1994, after its predecessor had been stolen in 1992. A donation by Helmut Gärtner, long-time municipal administrator of Frankfurt, in celebration of his election to first councillor of Eschborn, allowed its manufacturing by sculptor Edwin Hüller, the creator of the fifth Brickegickel in 1967. Today's Brickegickel is made out of bronze, and it is covered by a thin coat of gold. From 2013 to 2017, the Brickegickel was refurbished; it was then placed at its historical original position, the upstream side of the middle of the bridge.

== Legends around the Alte Brücke ==
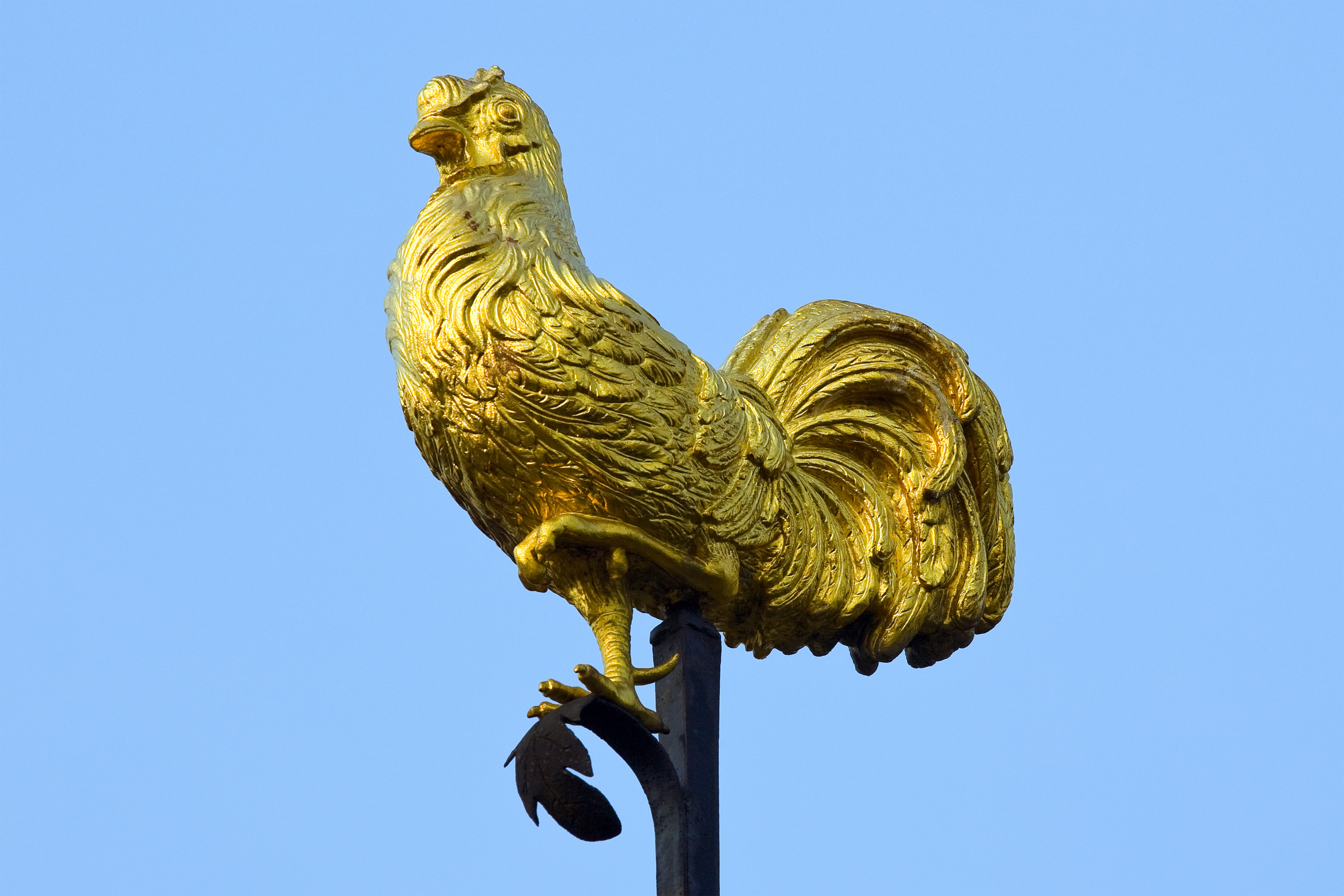
The first creature to cross the bridge

The Grimm Brothers delivered the story of the "Sachsenhäusener Brücke zu Frankfurt" ("Sachsenhausen bridge by Frankfurt") to posterity in their Deutsche Sagen ("German Legends") book.

German:

In der Mitte der Sachsenhäuser Brücke sind zwei Bogen oben zum Theil nur mit Holz zugelegt, damit [268] dies in Kriegszeiten weggenommen und die Verbindung leicht, ohne etwas zu sprengen, gehemmt werden kann. Davon gibt es folgende Sage.

Der Baumeister hatte sich verbindlich gemacht, die Brücke bis zu einer bestimmten Zeit zu vollenden. Als diese herannahte, sah er, daß es unmöglich war, und, wie nur noch zwei Tage übrig waren, rief er in der Angst den Teufel an und bat um seinen Beistand. Der Teufel erschien und erbot sich, die Brücke in der letzten Nacht fertig zu bauen, wenn ihm der Baumeister dafür das erste lebendige Wesen, das darüber ging, überliefern wollte. Der Vertrag wurde geschlossen und der Teufel baute in der letzten Nacht, ohne daß ein Menschenauge in der Finsterniß sehen konnte, wie es zuging, die Brücke ganz richtig fertig. Als nun der erste Morgen anbrach, kam der Baumeister und trieb einen Hahn über die Brücke vor sich her und überlieferte ihn dem Teufel. Dieser aber hatte eine menschliche Seele gewollt und wie er sich also betrogen sah, packte er zornig den Hahn, zerriß ihn und warf ihn durch die Brücke, wovon die zwei Löcher entstanden sind, die bis auf den heutigen Tag nicht können zugemauert werden, weil alles in der Nacht wieder zusammenfällt, was Tags daran gearbeitet ist. Ein goldner Hahn auf einer Eisenstange steht aber noch jetzt zum Wahrzeichen auf der Brücke.

This legend is also being told about other bridges, in very similar form. Examples include the Teufelsbrück, the Stone Bridge of Regensburg and the construction of Bamberg Cathedral as well as the bridge in Bamberg. However, in most other legends, other animals like goats or chamoises cross the bridge in place of a rooster. The origin of these legends is likely to be found in ancient records, for example the belief in river gods, which could only be appeased by sacrifices. Also, the construction of bridges had been one of the most challenging and most admired construction tasks since ancient times; for superstitious people, it was easy to imagine that supernatural powers were required for such a task to succeed.

Connected to the firefight between Swedish and Imperial troops in August 1635 is the legend of the "Schwedenschuss" ("Swedish gunshot"):

German:

An dem eisernen Kreuze auf der Sachsenhäuser Brücke hängt ein eisernes Christusbild, das in der rechten Wade eine tiefe Schußwunde hat. Damit aber ging es so zu.

Im Jahr 1635 waren die Schweden in der Stadt und hatten mit den Frankfurter Schützen ein heißes Gefecht auf der Brücke. Da sah ein Schwede das eiserne Christusbild an dem Kreuze, und in der Wuth darüber, daß die Herren Schweden so tapfern Widerstand fanden an den Frankfurtern, legte er sein geladenes Gewehr an, zielte und schoß mit einem tüchtigen Fluche nach dem heiligen Bilde.

Aber seine unheilige Rohheit ward sogleich bestraft.

Die Kugel drang zwar einen halben Zoll tief in das eiserne Bild, prallte aber dennoch zurück und gerade in die Brust und in das Herz des christusfeindlichen Schweden, der demnach zum letztenmal geschossen hatte.

Die Delle (Vertiefung) in der eisernen Wade aber ist heute noch zu sehen.

== Alte Brücke and the law ==
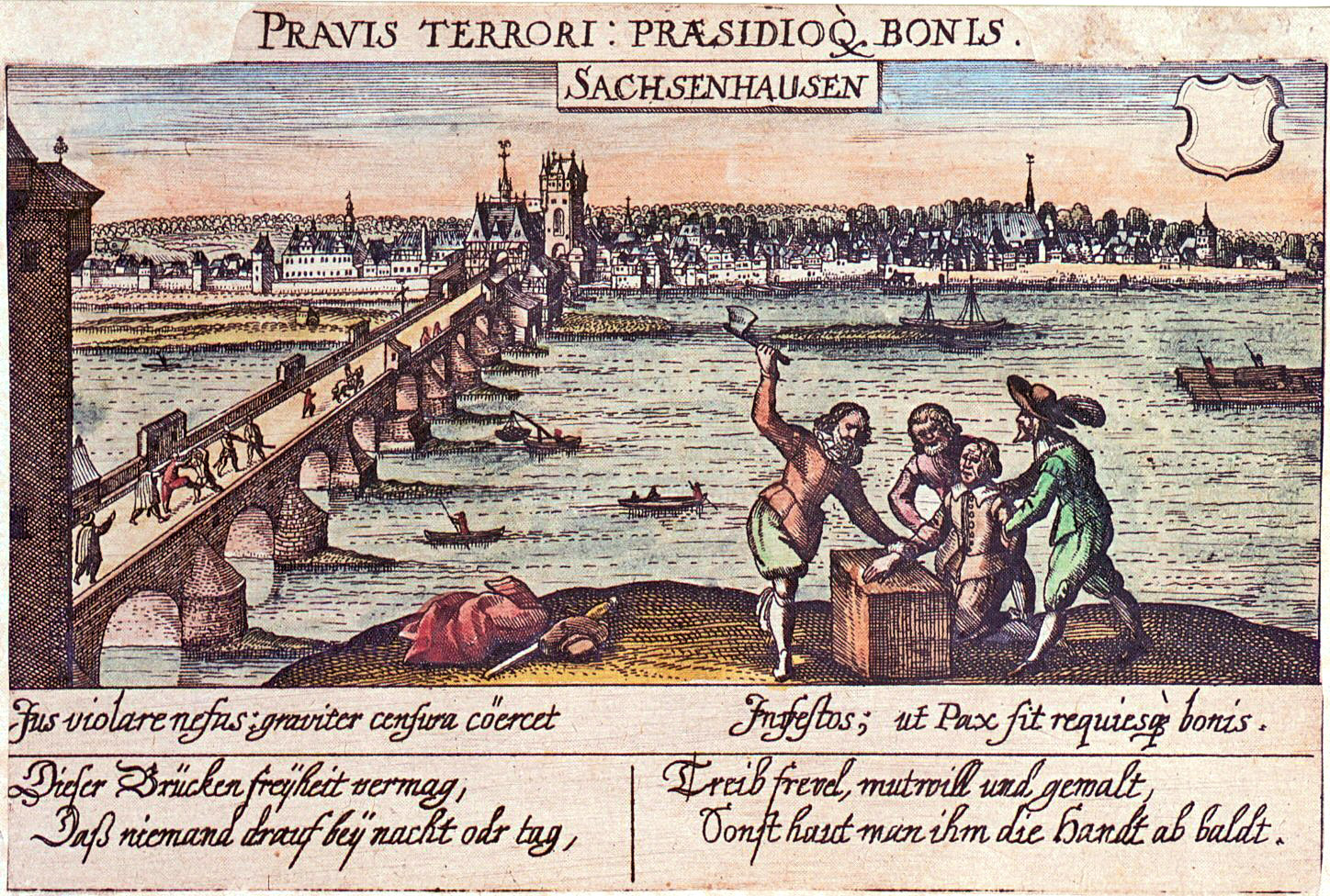
Depiction of the "bridge liberty"

=== Brückenfreiheit ("bridge liberty") ===
Since time immemorial, a special custom existed on the Alte Brücke, the so-called Brückenfreiheit ("bridge freedom"). Strictly speaking, the bridge was located outside of the city walls, and thus outside of the city. Every evening, the bridge gates were closed; passing the bridge by night was strictly forbidden. The Brückenfreiheit was connected to the obligation to maintain peace on the bridge. Violations of the law happening on the bridge were subject to draconian sanctions. An illustration by painter Philipp Uffenbach, made in 1610 for the Frankfurt bridge tower, shows this in a dramatic fashion: The picture shows three men scuffling on the bridge. In the foreground of the picture, the person who began the fight gets their hand cut off: "Wer dieser Brucken Freyheit bricht, dem wird sein frevel Hand gericht." ("He, who breaches the liberty of this bridge, will receive punishment for his sinful hand.") Using such depictions, the consequences of quarrel and fighting on the bridge have been made clear to those who were unable to read. The "politisches Schatzkästlein" ("political treasure chest"), a collection of chalcographies from 1630 compiled by Daniel Meissner, also contains a depiction of the Brückenfreiheit. Beside commonplace Latin remarks about not breaking the law, harsh sanctions and protection of the righteous, the plate also contains the German text: Dieser Brücken freÿheit vermag, Daß niemand drauf beÿ nacht odr tag, Treib frevel, mutwill und gewalt, Sonst haut man ihm die Handt ab baldt. ("These bridges' liberty means, that nobody on it by day or night, may practice wickedness, waggery or violence; else, their hand will soon be chopped off.")

=== Executions on Alte Brücke ===
In the Middle Ages, drowning was the most common kind of execution in Frankfurt. Responsible for the penal procedure was the Frankfurt City Council, since 1387. The preserved records of proceedings show that 91 people have been drowned between 1366 and 1500, followed by hanging of 70 people, and decapitation of 58 people. In the 17th century, only 38 people had been drowned, compared to 133 hanged and 28 decapitated convicts. The last execution by drowning occurred in 1613. After the Constitutio Criminalis Carolina of Emperor Charles V, drowning was listed as the designated punishment for theft, infanticide, incest, violation of legally imposed probation sanctions (breaking the "Urfehde"), poisoning and abortion.

The process of a drowning execution is described in detail in the "Lersnersche Chronik" ("chronicle of Lersner"): The convicted – which also included women, because women convicted to death had normally been drowned – were walked from the bridge tower, their prison, to the Brickegickel on the cross arch of the Alte Brücke: "Bis an die stat, da man pfleget zu richten" ("up to the place where the execution traditionally happens.") There, their knees, arms, hands and neck were bound, and they were pushed on a wooden plank over the bridge parapet into the Main. When the last glimpse of the condemned person faced the Brickegickel, the rooster was supposed to remind them of Receptance, while the crucifix promised divine grace and forgiveness of their sins. At this place, the river current was the strongest, causing the convict to be carried and drowned by the water immediately. When the water level was high enough, the dead body came ashore only outside of the city, not being Frankfurt's business anymore. Only when the water level was low, it could happen that the body came ashore on Frankfurt territory. In this case, the corpse was buried on the graveyard next to the leper colony. Contrary to other executions, drownings also occurred at night, to avoid the usual gathering of people at executions.

== Alte Brücke in art and literature ==
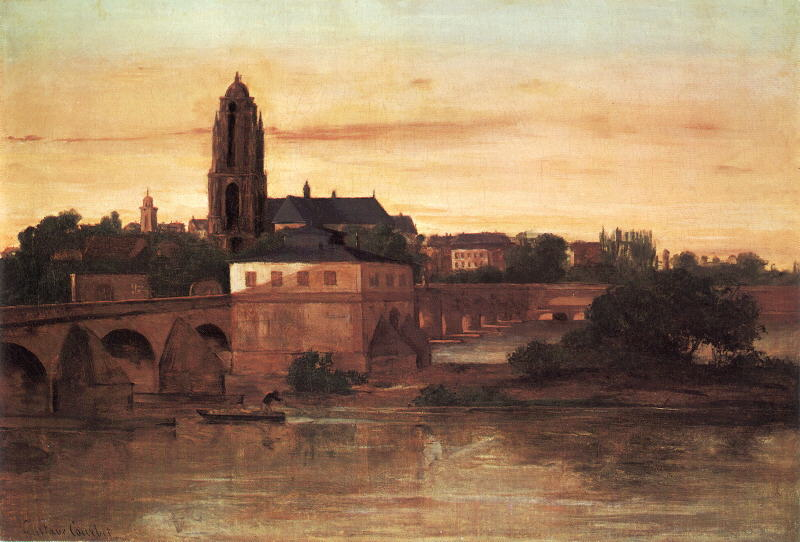
Gustave Courbet: "Blick auf Frankfurt", 1858

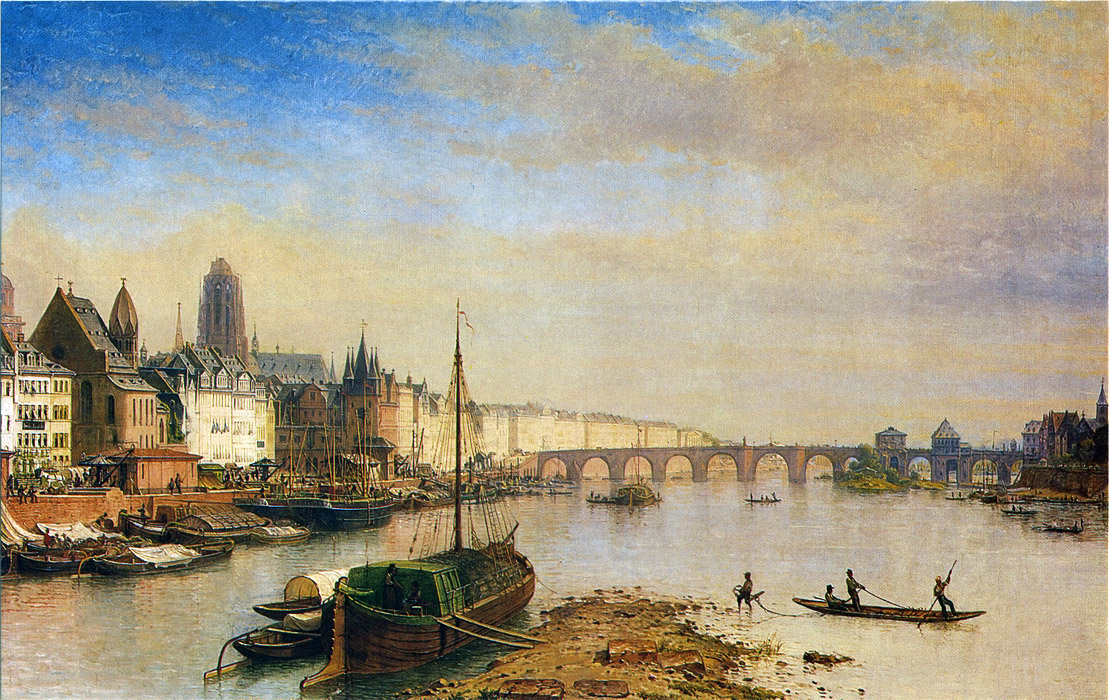
Carl Morgenstern: "Ansicht von Frankfurt am Main", 1850

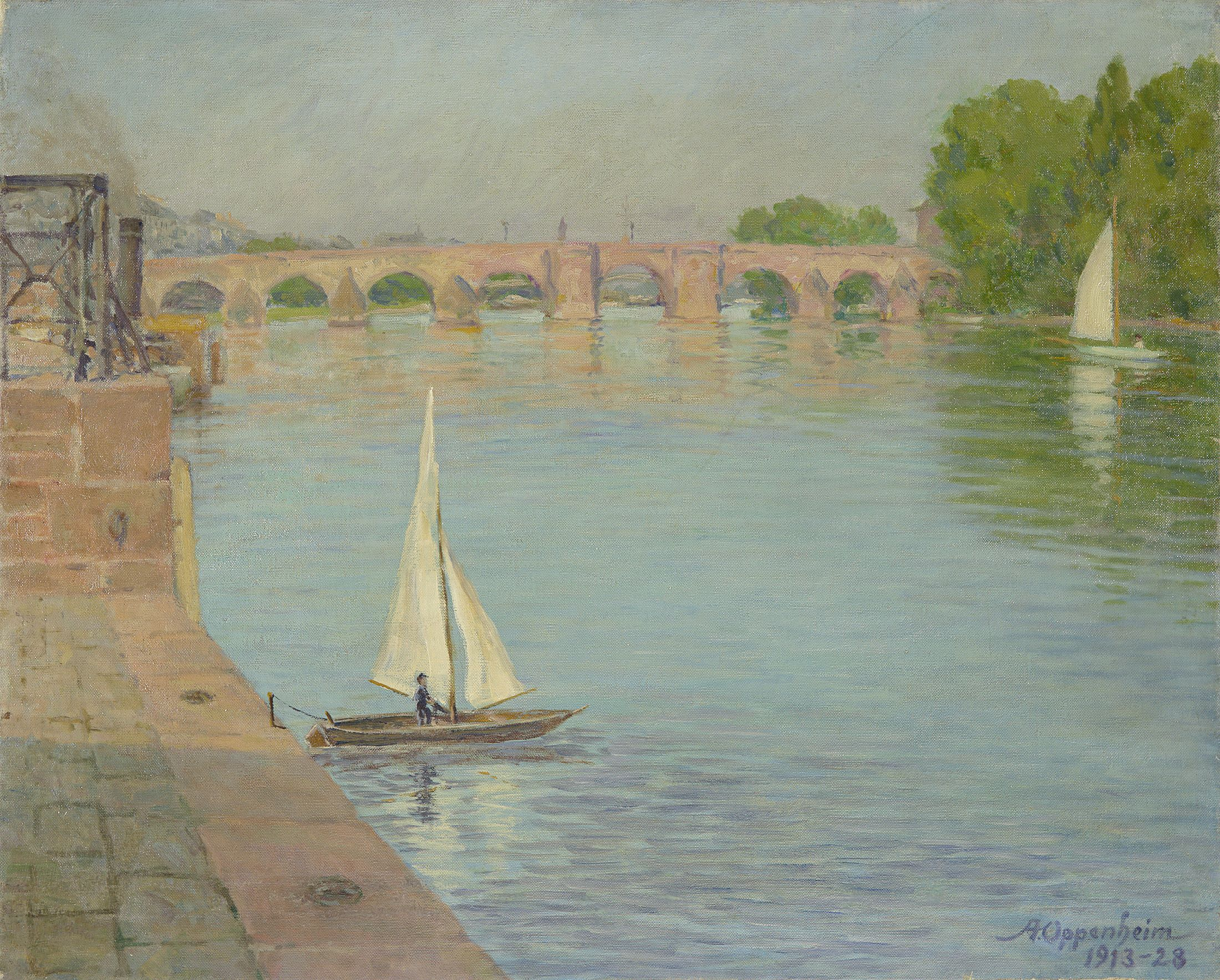
Alfred Oppenheim: "Alte Brücke", 1913

For centuries, the Alte Brücke was considered to be the most significant and beautiful building of Frankfurt. The panorama of city and bridge has inspired many painters for this reason, for example Conrad Faber, Matthäus Merian, Anton Kirchner, Anton Radl, Domenico Quaglio, Carl Morgenstern, Friedrich Wilhelm Delkeskamp, Carl Theodor Reiffenstein and Gustave Courbet. A major representative of the Kronberg artist colony, Fritz Wucherer, and the painter Otto Meisner created the last depictions of the Alte Brücke before it was deconstructed.

Numerous poets addressed the Alte Brücke. Johann Wolfgang von Goethe wrote about the Alte Brücke bridge in "Dichtung und Wahrheit":

"I loved more than anything else to promenade on the great bridge over the Maine. Its length, its firmness, and its fine appearance rendered it a notable structure, and it was, besides, almost the only memorial left from ancient times of the precautions due from the civil government to its citizens. The beautiful stream above and below bridge, attracted my eye, and when the gilt weathercock on the bridge-cross glittered in the sunshine, I always had a pleasant feeling."

German: Am liebsten spazierte ich auf der großen Mainbrücke. Ihre Länge, ihre Festigkeit, ihr gutes Ansehen machte sie zu einem bemerkenswerten Bauwerk; auch ist es aus früherer Zeit beinahe das einzige Denkmal jener Vorsorge, welche die weltliche Obrigkeit ihren Bürgern schuldig ist. Der schöne Fluß auf- und abwärts zog meine Blicke nach sich; und wenn auf dem Brückenkreuz der goldene Hahn im Sonnenschein glänzte, so war es mir immer eine erfreuliche Empfindung.

He later said: Man kann fast sagen, daß die Mainbrücke das einzige schöne und einer so großen Stadt würdige Monument aus der frühern Zeit sei.("One can almost say that the bridge over the Maine is the only beautiful monument of the past times that is worthy of such a large city.")

The Sachsenhausen Bridge was also considered to be one of the four most significant old bridges of Germany: "Die Dresdner ist die längste und schönste, die Prager die breiteste und frömmste, die Regensburger die stärkste und die Sachsenhäuser die röteste". ("The Augustus Bridge is the longest and most beautiful one, the Charles Bridge is the widest and godliest, the Regensburg Stone Bridge is the strongest, and the Sachsenhausen Bridge [A/N: Alte Brücke] is the reddest.")

Friedrich Stoltze, Adolf Stoltze and Karl Ettlinger, poets from Frankfurt, bequeathed especially many poems about the Alte Brücke. Among the poets of the 20th century, Fritz von Unruh is to be emphasized, who lived in within sight of the bridge for years. He wrote the celebratory poem for the bridge inauguration in 1926.

Since 1843, the philosopher Arthur Schopenhauer lived at the Schöne Aussicht ("beautiful view") in immediate vicinity of the Main bridge. In his treatise "Über Lärm und Geräusch" ("about noises and sounds") of 1851, he wrote down his anger especially about "das vermaledeite infernale Peitschenknallen" ("the damned infernal whip cracks") of the waggoners in the reverberating alleys of the cities:

"With all due respect to the most holy usefulness, I do not accept that a guy, who moves a carriage of sand or dung to another place, should in return gain the privilege to scotch any upcoming thought in ten thousand minds on their half-hour route through the city."

German: Bei allem Respekt vor der hochheiligen Nützlichkeit sehe ich doch nicht ein, daß ein Kerl, der eine Fuhr Sand oder Mist von der Stelle schafft, dadurch das Privilegium erlangen soll, jeden etwan aufsteigenden Gedanken in sukzessive zehntausend Köpfen (eine halbe Stunde Stadtweg) im Keime zu ersticken.

It is likely that the Frankfurt waggoners incited this anger when they spurred on their horses and carriages with loud shouts and whip cracks, and when the iron-fitted wheels of the heavy vehicles rumbled over the cobbles of the road and the bridge:

German: Daß nun aber ein Kerl, der mit ledigen Postpferden, oder auf einem losen Karrengaul, die engen Gassen einer volkreichen Stadt durchreitend, oder gar neben den Thieren hergehend, mit einer klafterlangen Peitsche aus Leibeskräften unaufhörlich klatscht, nicht verdiene, sogleich abzusitzen, um fünf aufrichtig gemeinte Stockprügel zu empfangen, Das werden mir alle Philanthropen der Welt, nebst den legislativen, sämmtliche Leibesstrafen, aus guten Gründen, abschaffenden Versammlungen, nicht einreden.

== See also ==
- List of medieval stone bridges in Germany
- Iconography of Charlemagne
- Eiserner Steg

== Literature ==
- Friedrich, Bothe (1977). Geschichte der Stadt Frankfurt am Main (3., erw. Aufl ed.). Frankfurt a.M.: Mohnkopf Reprints, Wolfgang Weidlich. ISBN 3-8035-8920-7. OCLC 3743150.
- Walter Gerteis: Das unbekannte Frankfurt. Verlag Frankfurter Bücher, Frankfurt am Main 1960.
  - Walter, Gerteis (1985). Das unbekannte Frankfurt (7. Aufl ed.). Frankfurt am Main: Verlag Frankfurter Bücher. ISBN 3-920346-05-X. OCLC 615136618.
- Bilderatlas zur Geschichte der Stadt Frankfurt am Main. Müller, Bernard., Städtische Historische Kommission (Frankfurt, Main) (Unveränd. Nachdr. d. Ausg. [Diesterweg] von 1916 ed.). Frankfurt am Main: Weidlich. 1976. ISBN 3-8035-8904-5. OCLC 263569063.
- Stadt am Fluss - Frankfurt und der Main : Aufsätze zum Thema. Rebentisch, Dieter (1. Aufl ed.). Frankfurt am Main: Kramer. 2004. ISBN 3-7829-0559-8. OCLC 180050642.
- Wolf-Christian, Setzepfandt (2002). Architekturführer Frankfurt am Main / Frankfurt am Main : architectural guide / by Wolf-Christian Setzepfandt (3., überarbeitete und erw. Aufl ed.). Berlin: Reimer. ISBN 3-496-01236-6. OCLC 50645225.
- Wissenbach, Björn; Brockhoff, Evelyn; Dehmer, Gabriele (2010). Frankfurts Alte Brücke - gestern, heute, morgen. Institut für Stadtgeschichte. Amt für Strassenbau und Erschliessung. Frankfurt am Main: Frankfurter Societäts-Druckerei. ISBN 978-3-7973-1176-4. OCLC 593827042.
- Carl Wolff, Rudolf Jung (1898), Die Baudenkmäler in Frankfurt am Main (PDF) (in German), vol. Zweiter Band. Weltliche Bauten, Frankfurt am Main: Völcker, pp. 259–280
