= Uffenbach =

Uffenbach or von Uffenbach is a surname. Notable people with the surname include:

- Philipp Uffenbach (1566–1636), German artist
- Zacharias Conrad von Uffenbach (1683–1734), German scholar
