= Ludwig Wucherer =

German entrepreneur (1790–1861)

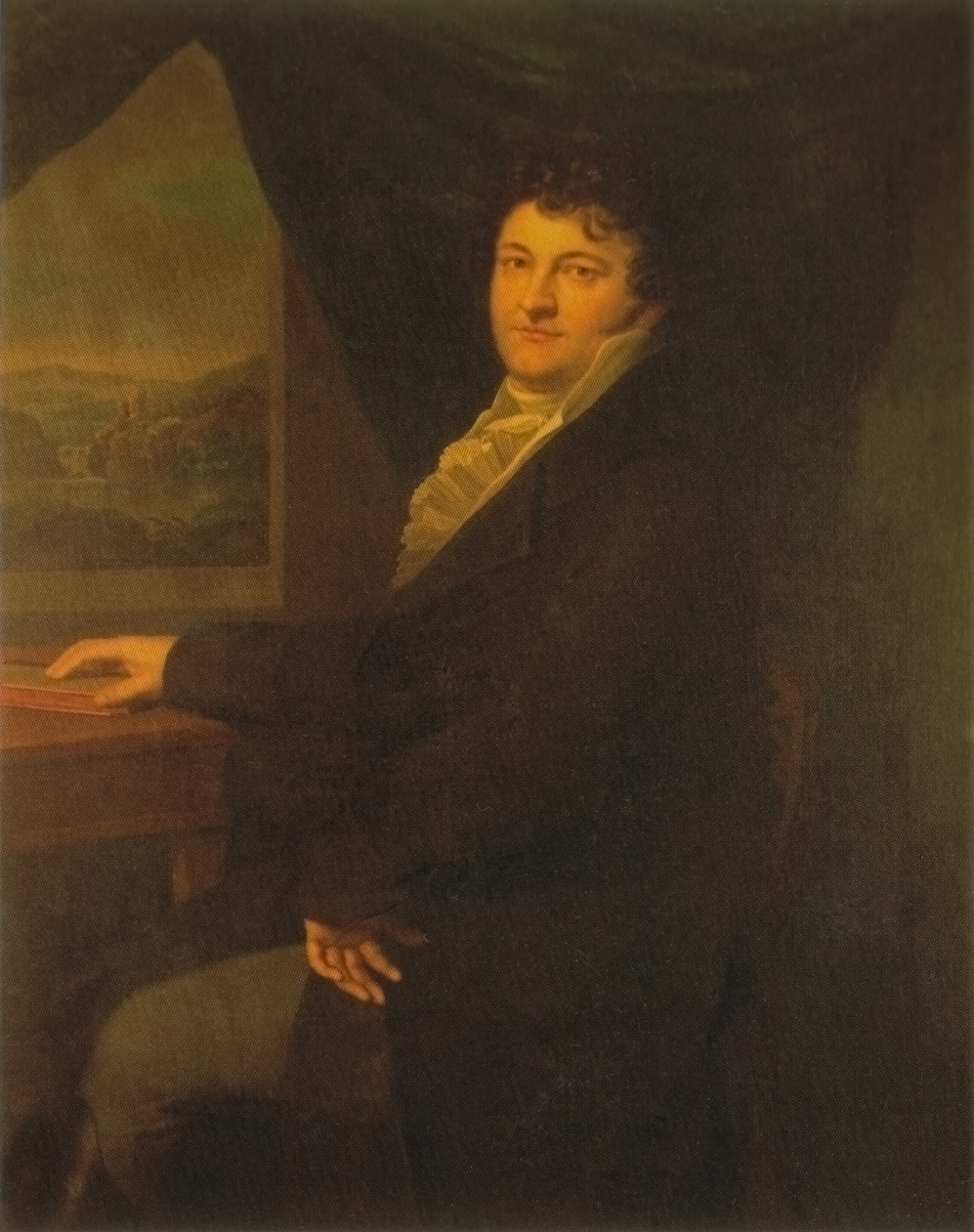
- Ludwig Wucherer
- Born: 30 May 1790
- Died: 15 December 1861 (aged 71)

Ludwig Wucherer (30 May 1790 – 15 December 1861) was a German entrepreneur.

== Biography ==
Wucherer was the youngest son of the Halle Chamber Council and Golgasfabrikanten Matthäus Wucherer in the Great Ulrichstrasse 73. After the early death of his parents, he took their Golgasfabrik that he continued successfully. He was councilor and chamberlain stipendiary in Halle. In 1826, he was the co-founder of the Committee for the transport of Halle waterway and 1844, together with the mayor of the time, Karl August Wilhelm Bertram, the Chamber of Commerce of Halle and the Saale district. His grave is in the Halle Stadtgottesacker.
