= Philipp Uffenbach =

German painter

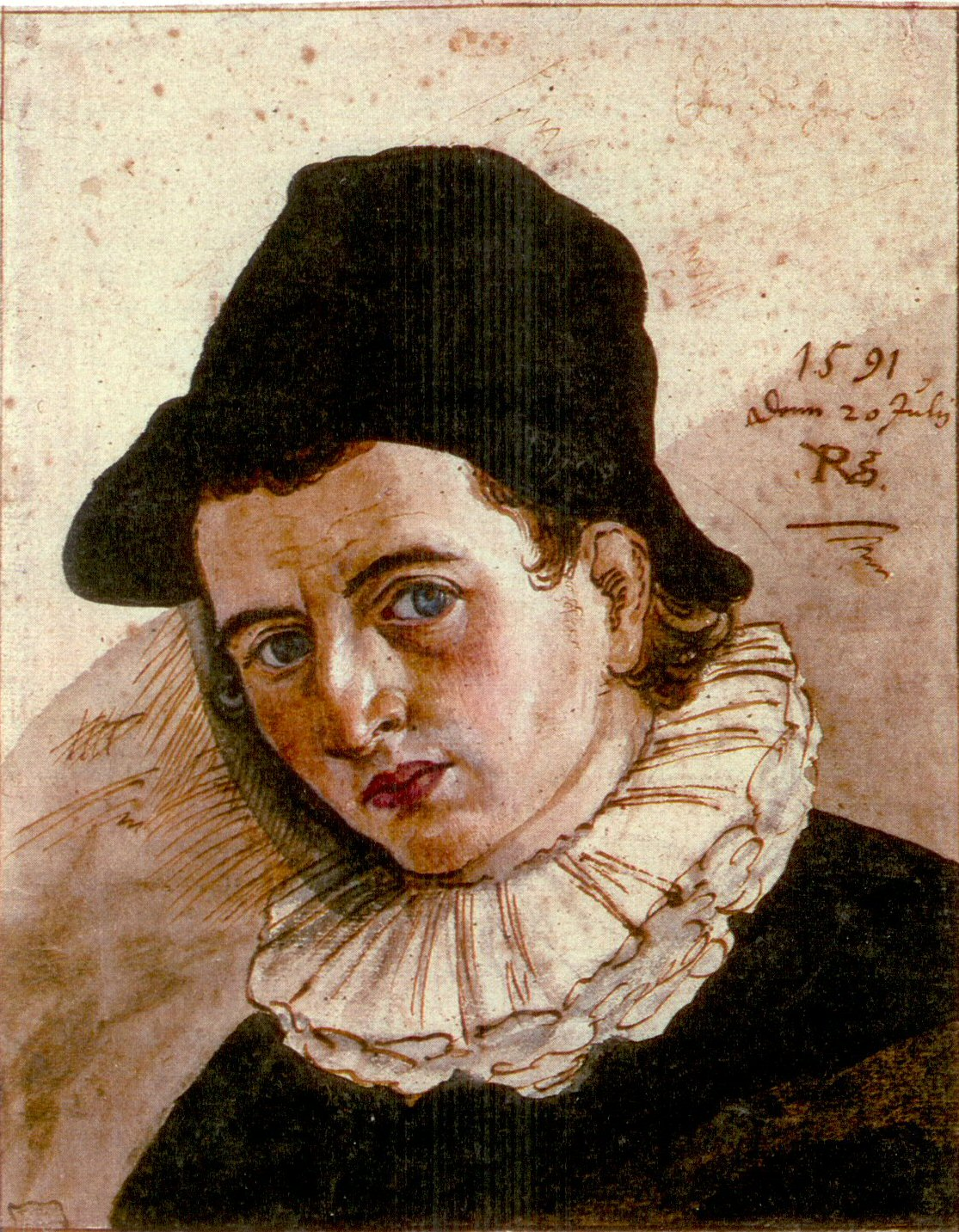
Self-portrait of Philipp Uffenbach, 1591

Philipp Uffenbach (15 January 1566 – 6 April 1636) was a German painter and etcher. He was born in Frankfurt, and trained under Hans Grimmer. One of his pupils was Adam Elsheimer. His interests included mechanics, geometry alchemy, and anatomy.

== Career ==
In 1598 Uffenbach obtained the citizenship of Frankfurt, after he had married and had taken over the painter's workshop of his father-in-law in 1592. Only a few of his paintings and engravings are preserved; an example is the oil painting Adoration of the Magi (1587). His chief work is Ascension of Jesus of 1599, which he painted for the Dominican-Church in Frankfurt on Main. Conserved fragments can be found in the Historical Museum of the City of Frankfurt. It is known that he worked on behalf of the council of the city, e.g. he represented the Brückenfreiheit at the tower of Old Bridge of Frankfurt on Main (1610), he colored the figure Justitia for the Fountain of Justicia on Römerberg. 1887 this figure had been replaced by a sculpture in bronze. For Landgrave Philipp III. (Hessen-Butzbach) of Hessen-Butzbach he made the ceiling fresco for the "Landgrafschloss" (landgrave's castle).

In 1598, he wrote the booklet Zeitweiser (time pointer) containing a printed diptych sundial. On the horizontal part of this sundial, he presented the oldest gnomonic world map known so far. He also was interested in the problem of squaring the circle and published the book with the title De quadratura circuli mechanici.

== Sources ==
- Bryan, Michael (1889). Walter Armstrong; Robert Edmund Graves (eds.). Dictionary of Painters and Engravers, Biographical and Critical. Vol. II L-Z. London: George Bell and Sons. pp. 598–599.
- Reinhard Folk: Uffenbach's "Zeitweiser" published 1598 in The Compendium, Journal of the North American Sundial Society, Vol. 21 Num. 3 Pag.4 September 2014 ISSN 1074-3197
- Ursula Opitz: Philipp Uffenbach Ein Frankfurter Maler um 1600 Deutscher Kunstverlag, Berlin München 2015, ISBN 3-422-07241-1; 312 pages.
