= Fritz Wucherer =

Swiss painter (1873–1948)

Fritz Wucherer (1873–1948) was a Swiss painter. He was born on 3 August 1873 in Basel.

When Fritz Wucherer was four, his family moved to London. Wucherer showed great potential as an artist in his childhood. His earliest teacher was the renowned landscape painter Eduard Josef Mueller. In 1892, Wucherer took an unexpected turn, and, instead of pursuing formal education, decided to go to Kronberg to learn painting from Anton Burger. He moved into a slovenly room in the Kronberg Castle. Later, he was able to live at his teacher's house. Wucherer learned painting from Burger for three years, a period that left an indelible impression on the young artist's development. In later years, Wucherer himself spoke of this highly influential part of his learning and although he eventually gave up Burger style of using human models, he always praised this style of work.

While studying under Anton Burger, Wucherer traveled to southern Germany and in 1894 toured Brussels and Antwerp. In these places, he came to see the landscapes resembling the French plein-air style. The sights were to leave a strong impression on him. In 1895, having completed his apprenticeship under Burger, Wucherer went to Paris to hone his skills further, and began living in a studio in Montmartre. During his time in Paris, he became friends with the painters Adolf Schreyer and Eugen Jettel.

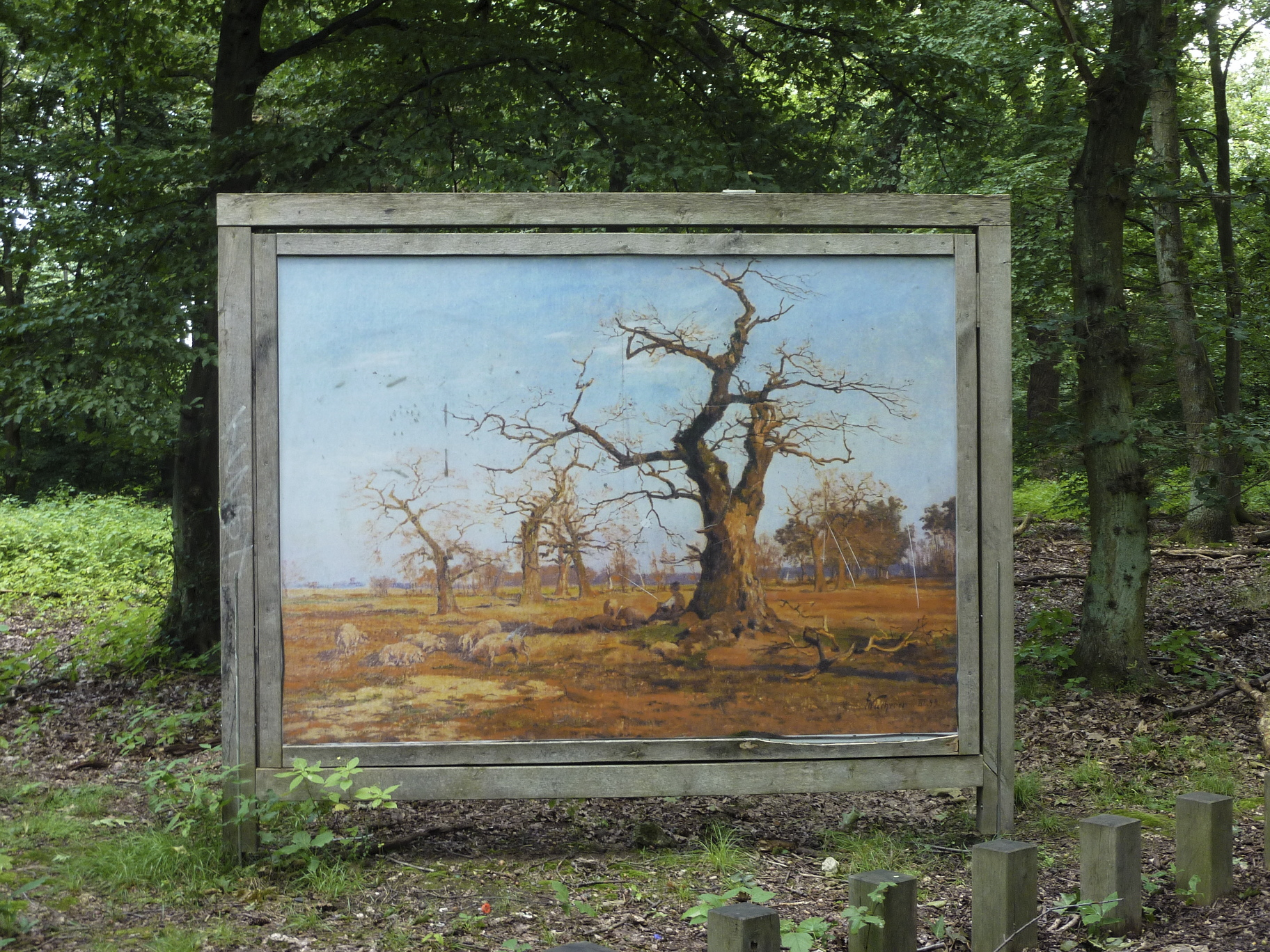
A painting by Fritz Wucherer.

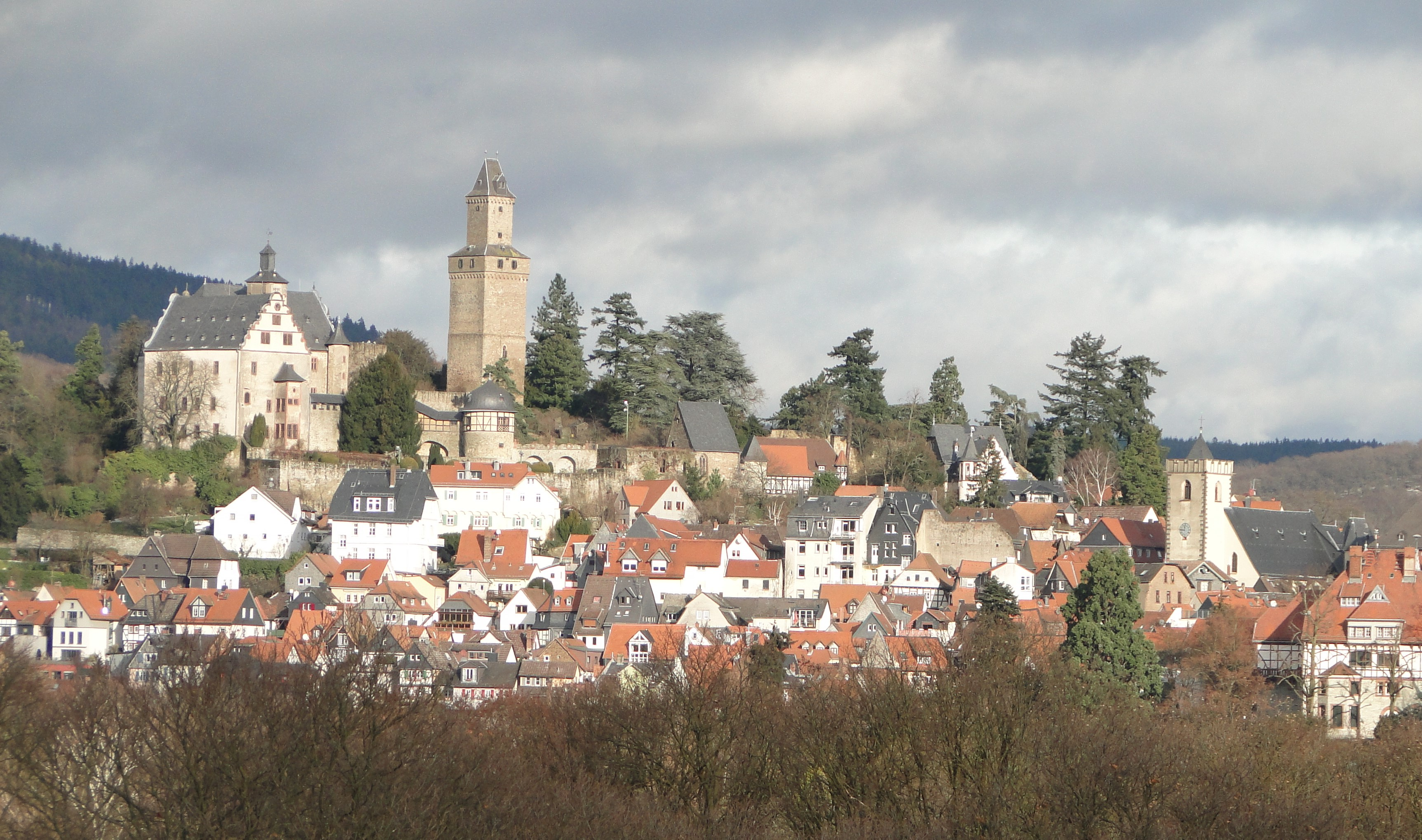
The Kronberg Castle, where Fritz Wucherer once lived.
