= 2015–16 New Year's Eve sexual assaults =

Mass sexual assaults mostly in Cologne and by North African men

Coordinates: 50.9422°N 6.9578°E

- Part of the European migrant crisis
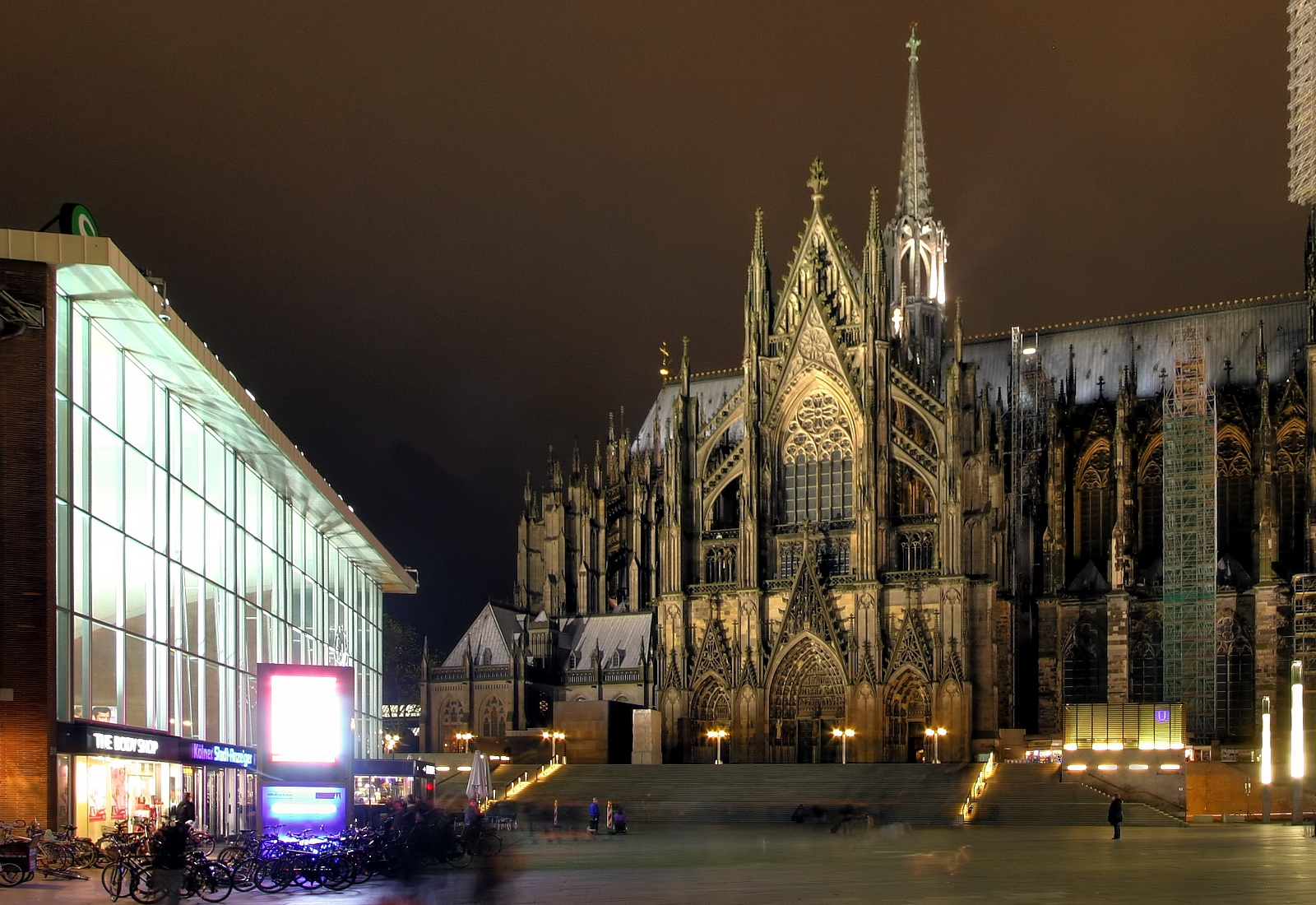
- Most of the assaults in Cologne took place on the plaza between central railway station (left) and cathedral.

- Number of women sexually assaulted in Germany: Cologne: around 650 (22 rapes); Hamburg: over 400 (2 rapes); Düsseldorf: 103; Frankfurt am Main: 60; Stuttgart: 17; Dortmund: 7 Bielefeld: 6 Paderborn: several Borken: 2 Detmold: 2 Essen: 2 Perpetrators: The first 120 identified suspects (by July 2016) mostly originated in North Africa (see also §Descriptions of offenders below). Number of perpetrators: over 2,000
- Location: Germany
- Date: 31 December 2015–1 January 2016 (CET)

During the 2015–2016 celebrations of New Year's Eve in several German cities, a large number of sexual assaults occurred. Approximately 1,200 women were reported to have been sexually assaulted, especially in the city of Cologne. In many of the incidents, while these women were in public spaces, they were surrounded, sexually assaulted and gang raped by large groups of Muslim men of North African and Arab origins. The Federal Criminal Police Office confirmed in July 2016 that 1,200 women had been sexually assaulted on that night.

By 4 January 2016, German media reports stated that, in Cologne, the perpetrators had mostly been described by the victims and witnesses as being "North African", "Arab", "dark-skinned", and "foreign". On 5 January 2016, the German government and the Cologne police speculated that the attacks might have been organized. However, by 21 January, the government of North Rhine-Westphalia declared that there were no indications of premeditated organized attacks, and on 11 February, the new Cologne police chief stated the same. Instead, the Cologne police chief suggested that the perpetrators had come from countries where such sexual assaults by groups of men against women are common. That suggestion was confirmed in a Federal Criminal Police Office report in June 2016, which also identified five more factors contributing to the occurrence of the attacks: group pressure, absence of police intervention, frustrations of migrants, disinhibition caused by alcohol and/or drug use, and disinhibition due to lack of social ties with German society.

By April 2016, statistics recorded by authorities indicated that out of the identified 153 suspects in Cologne who were convicted of sexual offenses and other crimes on New Year's Eve, two-thirds were originally from Morocco or Algeria, 44% were asylum-seekers, another 12% were likely to have been in Germany illegally, and 3% were underaged unaccompanied refugees. By July 2016, the police stated that half of the 120 identified suspects of sexual offenses on New Year's Eve had arrived in Germany during the year 2015, and most of those 120 had come from North Africa, with four suspects having been convicted nationwide. By November 2016, around 200 suspects of the sexual assaults had been identified across Germany.

Sexual assaults were also reported to have occurred in cities in Finland, Sweden, Austria and Switzerland.

== Assaults ==
=== Cologne ===
Polizei NRW K
(@polizei_nrw_k)
tweeted:

German:

#polizei #köln #leverkusen Ausgelassene Stimmung – Feiern weitgehend friedlich – Infos unter https://www.presseportal.de/blaulicht/pm/12415/3214905

Translation:

#police #cologne #leverkusen Exuberant Mood – Celebrations largely peaceful – Info at https://www.presseportal.de/blaulicht/pm/12415/3214905

1 January 2016

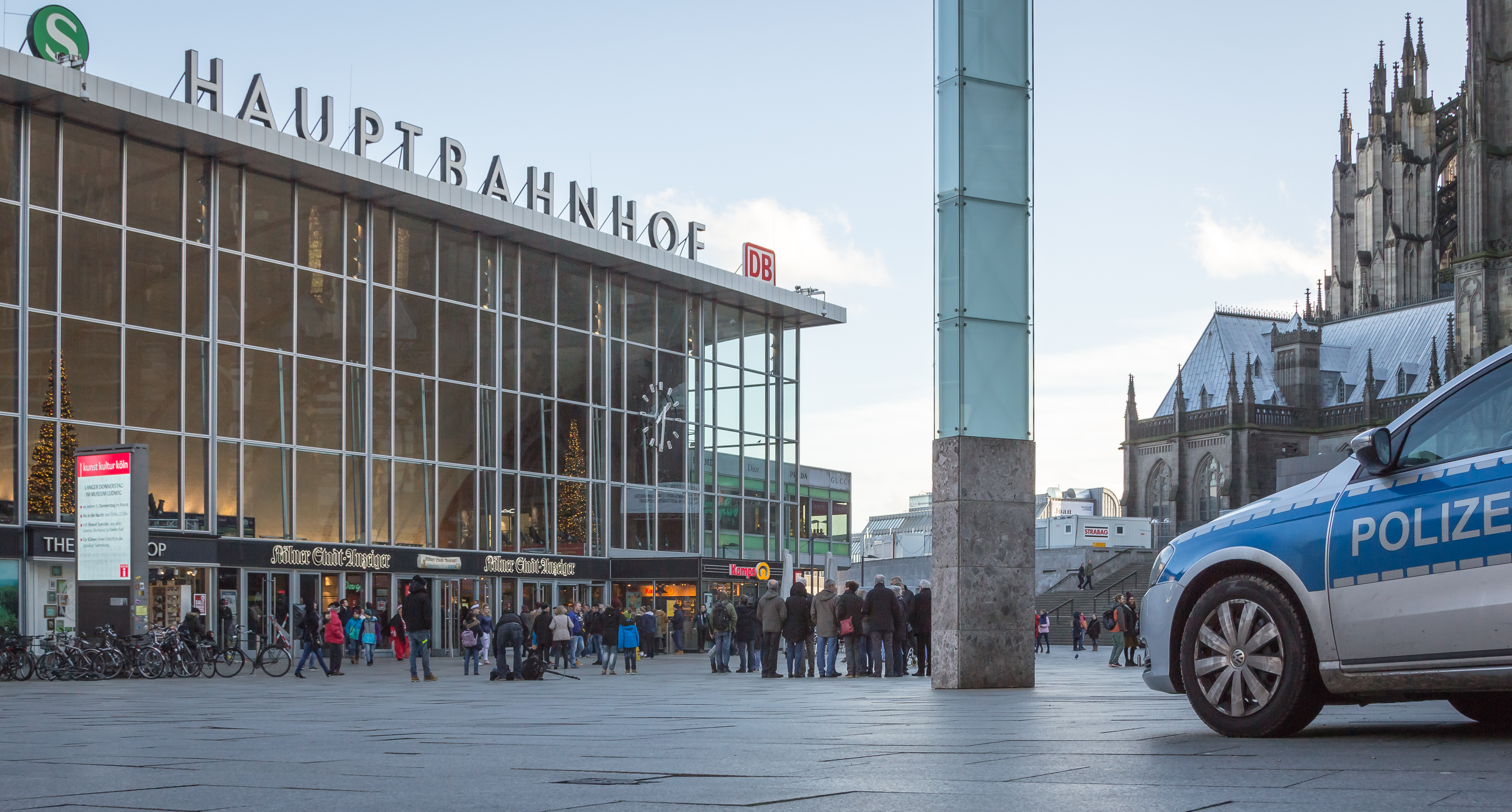
Cologne's Bahnhofsvorplatz between the central railway station (left) and the city's cathedral (right) was the main site of the sexual assaults and robberies on New Year's Eve 2015–16.

There are conflicting accounts about when reports of sexual assaults during New Year's Night 2015–16 first reached the Cologne police. One high-ranking Cologne police officer reported that in the evening around 22:00 on 31 December 2015, passers-by in the plaza between the Cologne Central Train Station and the Cologne Cathedral informed police officers on the spot about fights, robberies, and sexual assaults on women taking place in and around the train station; The New York Times wrote however that only after midnight did the police hear of the assaults, and the German newspaper Die Welt suggested the same. During the night, three emergency calls concerning harassment or robbery near the railway station and the cathedral had reached Cologne police headquarters.

In a press release on 1 January at 08:57 or 11:45, the Cologne police announced that the night had been "mostly peaceful" ("weitgehend friedlich") – also rendered as: "relaxed" ("entspannt"). At 13:21, the large local newspaper Kölner Stadt-Anzeiger reported: Sexual harassment in the New Year's Eve (...) In the Cologne Central Train Station, several women have been harassed by unknown men". Also the Cologne tabloid Express that day at 21:08 reported the incidents: "New Year's Eve, Central Train Station: Young women sexually harassed". During the rest of 1 January, several more notifications of sexual assaults or robberies reached the Cologne police.

On Saturday, 2 January, at 16:58, the Cologne police reported the harassment incidents in a new press release: nearly 30 criminal notifications of attacks and robberies on women, in some cases indecent touching of women by groups of men with a "north African appearance", according to witnesses. That news was quickly, but selectively, picked up by the prominent newspaper Süddeutsche Zeitung, which reported the sexual attacks but not the ethnic profile of the suspects. Also the national commercial TV channel RTL that day reported the sexual assaults in Cologne in the New Year's Eve.

At a press conference on Monday, 4 January 2016 at 14:00, Cologne's police chief Wolfgang Albers stated that "a very large number of sexual assaults" had been committed on Cologne's New Year's Night by groups of young men "with an appearance largely from the north African or Arab world", with all witnesses having uttered this same racial description. The Cologne police force had received 60 crime reports at that time, 15 or 20 of which were of sexual assaults, in one case rape in legal terms. With that press conference, publicity about the Cologne sexual attacks started to spread in news media around the world. The German public service TV broadcaster ZDF, though, did not report on the Cologne developments at all in its news bulletin Heute Journal on 4 January 19:00, for the reasons that they could not yet find an eyewitness willing to talk on camera, nor confirmation of the ethnicity of the suspects. The news bulletin Tagesschau at 20:00, from the German public-service TV broadcaster ARD, however, did report on the Cologne events, including the police statement that the offenders, judging by their looks, had come from the Arab or North African regions.

On 5 January 2016, 90 reports of criminal incidents had been received by the Cologne police concerning New Year's Eve, 22 or 23 of which were sexual assaults. Challenged that day by a journalist about his police force's announcement on 1 January that the situation on New Year's Eve had been "relaxed" ("entspannt"), Cologne police chief Albers now said that statement "was wrong". By 6 January 106 reports had been filed about various crimes, three-quarters of them suggesting a sexual component; on 6 or 7 January they appeared to include two alleged rapes.

By 8 January, 170 women had reported various crimes during New Year's Eve in Cologne, including two rapes. By 11 January, the total number of complaints totaled 553, with sexual offences comprising nearly half of the cases. By 15 January, the total number of complaints was 676; 347 of these included sexual offences. On 21 January, the total number of complaints was 821; 359 of them included sexual offences, three of them rape; while some complaints included more than one victim; 1,049 people were affected in total.

By 30 January 2016, the number of complaints and reports of sexual offences concerning last New Year's Eve in Cologne totaled 433. By 15 February, the number of complaints over sexual offences had risen to 467. As of 18 March, the Cologne Public Prosecutor reported 1,139 crime complaints filed concerning New Year's Eve, 485 of them about sexual offences. By 6 April, the total number of reported crimes on Cologne's New Year's Night was 1,529; a total of 1,218 victims were involved, 529 of them victims of sexual offences. In July 2016, the Bundeskriminalamt (German Federal Criminal Police) estimated that around 650 women had been sexually assaulted in Cologne in the New Year's Eve. By 25 November 2016, 509 sexual offences had been reported concerning Cologne's last New Year's Eve, among them 22 rapes.

=== Stuttgart ===
The local newspaper Stuttgarter Nachrichten on its website on 3 January 2016 reported that in the city centre of Stuttgart in the Silvesternacht (New Year's Eve) two 18-year-old women had been sexually assaulted by a group of around fifteen men about 30–40 years of age, who had the appearance of black-haired "southern people" with "Arab" looks.

On 5 January, the same website reported that a handful of further purported victims had made reports themselves, not specifying how many of them had purportedly been sexually assaulted. These Stuttgart incidents were briefly mentioned in international news media as of 5 January in the slipstream of their reporting on the Cologne sexual assaults. By 17 January 2016, the number of complaints of sexual offences in Stuttgart totaled 17.

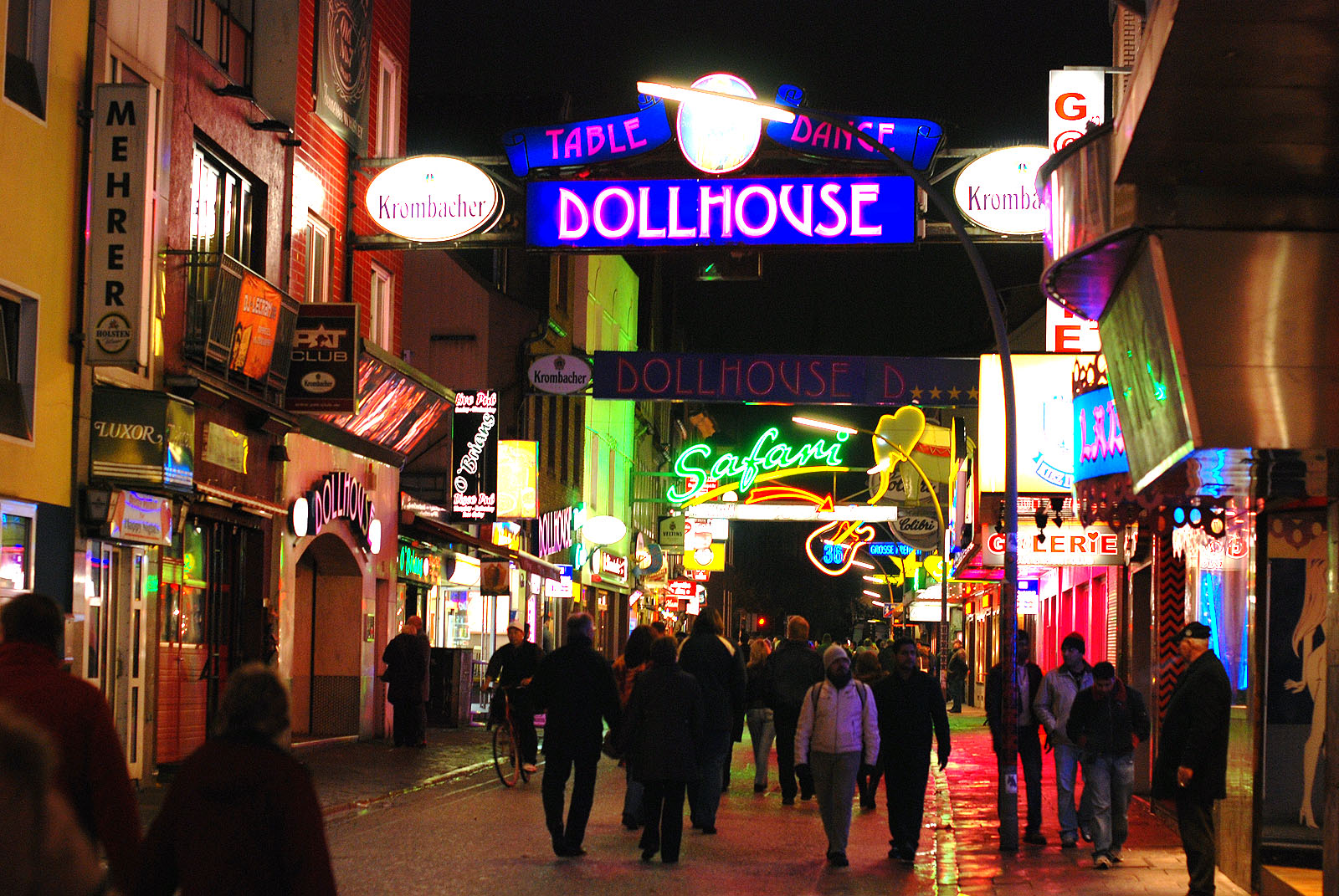
Most of the alleged sexual assaults in Hamburg in the New Year's Eve 2015–16 took place on the Große Freiheit street.

=== Hamburg ===
During New Year's Eve 2015–16, only one telephone call concerning sexual harassment, at 03:00, reached the Hamburg police. On New Year's Day, 14 people have reported to the Hamburg police to have been sexually assaulted on New Year's Eve, but those earliest reports were then lost in the police records, to be rediscovered around 20 January.

On 5 January 2016, the Hamburg police were aware of 13 women reported to have been sexually assaulted on New Year's Eve, and that day – possibly incited by the news from Cologne the previous day, as a political scientist suggested – a spokesman of the Hamburg police announced that in Hamburg's pleasure quarter of St. Pauli, women between 18 and 24 years old had been sexually harassed and robbed, "in some cases simultaneously by several men in groups of different sizes with southern or Arab looks", possibly in groups of "between 20 and 40 persons". That same day, these Hamburg incidents were briefly mentioned in international news media, in their reporting on the Cologne sexual assaults. On 6 January, the number of complaints of sexual harassment in Hamburg had increased to 39, not counting the 14 cases reported on 1 January that would not be reviewed until around 20 January.

The number of complaints about either sexual harassment or robbery on New Year's Eve in Hamburg rose further: 53 complaints on 5 January, 70 complaints on 8 January, 108 complaints on 10 January, 153 complaints on 11 January, 195 complaints on 14 January.

On 14 January, the weekly paper Die Zeit reported over 150 complaints in Hamburg strictly concerning sexual attacks. On 15 January, 205 complaints had been registered in Hamburg, most of them about sexual harassment, involving 306 victims. On 21 January, there were 218 complaints regarding 351 victims, and on 4 February, there were 236 complaints, including two for rape, involving 400 women reportedly being sexually harassed. The Bundeskriminalamt (Federal Criminal Police) in July 2016 confirmed that in Hamburg over 400 women reported being victims of sexual violence on New Year's Eve.

=== Frankfurt ===
In the afternoon of 5 January 2016, several women reported to the police in Frankfurt am Main that they had been sexually assaulted on New Year's Eve, in one case by a group of ten "North African" men speaking poor English with Arabic accents. This was reported in German news media on 6 January, and briefly reported in international news media as of 7 January 2016 in their reporting on the Cologne sexual assaults.

By 8 January, the Frankfurt police had counted fifteen reported sexual attacks by groups of "Arab" or "North African" men. By 11 January 2016, the police had counted 22 reported sexual attacks by such groups on New Year's Eve. In September 2016, in response to a question from a newspaper, the Staatsanwaltschaft (state attorney) declared that 60 reports of sexual harassment of women on New Year's Eve in Frankfurt, mostly perpetrated by groups, had been brought before them.

=== Dortmund ===
On 5 January 2016, two complaints of sexual assault on New Year's Eve in Dortmund, by groups of men addressing the women in broken German or English, have been reported to the police. That news was reported on 6 January in the local newspaper Ruhr Nachrichten.

By 14 January 2016, according to a report of the Minister of Justice in North Rhine-Westphalia, five suspicions of sexual assaults in Dortmund in the New Year's Eve had been registered. By 18 January, four sexual offences in Dortmund in the New Year's Eve, involving seven victims, were being investigated.

=== Bielefeld ===
On 6 January 2016, the local Bielefelder newspaper Neue Westfälische and national newspaper Frankfurter Allgemeine Zeitung reported that on New Year's Eve, in the amusement area around the Boulevard of Bielefeld, at least five young women had been sexually assaulted, mostly by groups of non-German-speaking men, whom the local police described as "immigrants" and as "Algerian and Moroccan Antanzdiebe ['charmer-thieves', 'waltzers']".

The Bielefeld police stated on 6 January that two complaints had been filed by women about physical harassment on New Year's Eve. On 9 January 2016, Die Welt wrote that "several complaints" had been filed concerning sexual assaults in New Year's Eve in Bielefeld.

On 16 January, the police stated that six women had filed complaints of sexual harassment; most of those reports only came after calls in the local news media. By 18 January, the Bielefeld police were investigating five sexual offences on New Year's Eve. In November 2016, a news source reported twenty offences in Bielefeld concerning last New Year's Eve, not specifying how many of them were sexual offences.

=== Düsseldorf ===
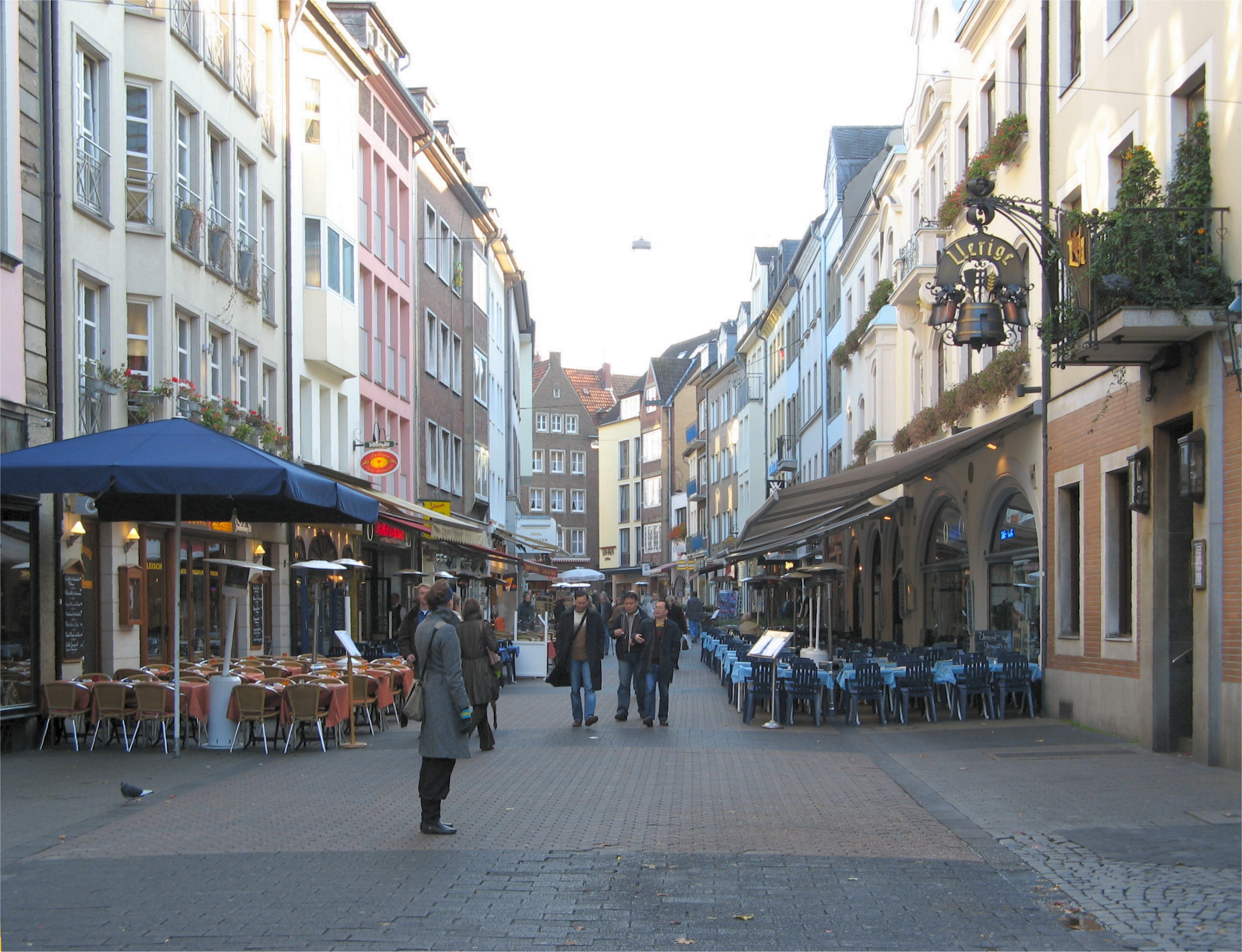
103 sexual offences were reported in the city centre of Düsseldorf.

After the breaking of the news of the mass sexual assaults on New Year's Eve in Cologne, on 4 January 2016, similar reports started to reach the police in Düsseldorf. Between 4 and 6 January, around 20 reports of women having been sexually harassed were recorded; by 8 January, the number had increased to 41.

On 7 January, international news media reported the sexual assaults in Düsseldorf were committed by men of north African or Arab appearance. On 14 January 48 sexual attacks on women on New Year's Eve in Düsseldorf had been registered.

On 18 January, the police in Düsseldorf counted 69 complaints of sexual offences on New Year's Eve. By 21 January, the police mentioned 57 cases of sexual harassment, and 13 cases of insults based on sex or gender. By November 2016, 103 complaints over sexual offences in Düsseldorf on New Year's Eve had been registered by the police or public prosecutor.

=== Additional cities ===
On 14 January 2016, the WDR citing a report of the Minister of Justice in North Rhine-Westphalia reported about the last New Year's Eve:

- Several women in Paderborn having allegedly been touched indecently by a group of 8 to 10 "north African" men;
- Two attempts at rape in Detmold, purportedly committed by "foreign" looking men in the direct vicinity of a refugees' shelter;
- Two girls in Borken (North Rhine-Westphalia) purportedly having been assaulted by "several asylum seekers";
- Two cases of sexual harassment in Essen.

An unspecified number of sexual assaults on New Year's Eve 2015–16 took place in unspecified cities in the federal state of Hesse. Sexual assaults on New Year's Eve may have taken place in Nuremberg, Munich, Berlin, and cities in Baden-Württemberg, but the one newspaper mentioning those places did not discriminate between trick robberies (Antanzdiebstahl) and sexual offences.

== Circumstances and assaults in detail ==
=== In Cologne ===
Cologne, Germany's fourth largest city, is traditionally a popular venue for locals and visitors to celebrate New Year's Eve (Silvesternacht), watching the fireworks over the river Rhine and the skyline of the city. The area around the medieval Cologne Cathedral (Kölner Dom), with its Christmas market, is specifically popular around New Year's Eve, but also notorious for pickpockets and theft. One of the usual gathering locations for revellers is the plaza (Bahnhofsvorplatz) between the central train station and the cathedral.

The official police account holds that around 21:00 on 31 December 2015, some 500 men, aged 15–35, appearing Arab or North African in background, strongly intoxicated with alcohol, had gathered on the plaza between Cologne central train station and the cathedral and were shooting fireworks into the air and at the rest of the crowd, after which this 'Arab/North African' group had grown to 1,000 men by 23:00. A high commissioner of the Cologne police deployed at the scene that night contended in Die Welt on 7 January that at 21:45 the crowd on the plaza and cathedral steps was randomly shooting fireworks and throwing bottles, "mostly men with migration background", counted already "several thousand", and kept growing until 23:00.

Around 23:30, because of considerable danger to people and objects or to avoid panic caused by the fireworks, the police decided to evacuate the forecourt and steps of the cathedral and the plaza in the direction of the Dompropst-Ketzer-Straße. This lasted until 00:15, and was difficult because of the state of intoxication of persons with alcohol, cannabis, or other substances. Cologne police chief Wolfgang Albers stated in a press conference on 4 January that the evacuation was "less than effective". He also stated that the evacuation was undertaken with a force of 213 police officers, which was reiterated on 10 January by police director Temme. Research by Kölner Express in March would show that it had actually been only 150 policemen: 80 state police (Landesbeamte) and 70 railway station security police (Bahnhofsinnere Bundespolizei). The corrected number of policemen had been transmitted to the Parliamentary Committee of the Interior of North Rhine-Westphalia on 11 January. A police spokesman could not say why the correction hadn't also been made public at the time, suggesting that perhaps the inquiry was "not so important".

Between 22:00 and 05:00 on New Year's Night, the personal details of 71 people in the crowds near the central railway station were recorded, 32 offences recorded, 11 people were taken into custody, and four others arrested. Nevertheless, the police were not able to take all offenders into custody.

There are conflicting reports about when the sexual assaults started. One high-ranking Cologne police officer, in his written report to his superiors, stated that on his arrival at the cathedral and railway station plaza around 22:00, civilians came to the policemen to tell about thefts, fights, and sexual assaults going on; also German magazine Cicero stated that sexual assaults in the area of the train station reportedly took place both before and after the evacuation of the plaza. The New York Times reported, however, that the sexual assaults began only after midnight. There is no disagreement that the sexual assaults reportedly were perpetrated by men emerging from that aforementioned group of 1,000 or more mostly 'Arab or North African' men. On 2 January 2016, the police estimated the sexual attackers had worked in groups of 2 to 20 men. Witnesses said five days later that the groups were about 30 to 40 men. A report from the end of February 2016 by the Bundeskriminalamt (Federal Criminal Police) stated, the groups were mostly between 9 and 100 men, encircling lone women, sexually assaulting them (groping, rape, and insults), often combined with robbery and theft.

The numbers of reported sexual assaults on New Year's Eve steadily increased as of 1 January 2016. By 13 January 2016, also several complaints had been filed against the Cologne police for denial of assistance on New Year's Night. By 17 March 2016, 51 complaints had been filed against either Cologne's chief of police Wolfgang Albers or the North Rhine-Westphalian Minister of the Interior Ralf Jäger.

=== In other cities ===
Hamburg – Sexual harassment by presumed "refugees" which purportedly had troubled Hamburg's nightlife scene since the autumn of 2015 apparently reemerged on New Year's Eve 2015–16, when groups of young men in Große Freiheit encircled women, groping them between the legs, and tearing their tights and underwear. Sexual assaults that night reportedly also took place on Reeperbahn. The police had been present with 200 officers in the area of Große Freiheit and Reeperbahn but had not noticed any sexual assaults; the first and only telephone call to the Hamburg police concerning sexual harassment came at 3:00 a.m. that New Year's Night.

Stuttgart – The earliest reported harassments and attacks on women on Stuttgart's New Year's Eve 2015–16, reported on 3 and 5 January in a local newspaper, had taken place in the city centre near Schlossplatz, Königstraße and Königsbau. Groups of men were reported to have encircled women, groped and touched them indecently, and in some cases robbed their handbags or phones. Many of the early reported victims were not residents of Stuttgart but came from minor cities like Ulm and Konstanz in the hinterland, visiting this Swabian metropolis for New Year's celebrations.

Frankfurt – The first 22 reported sexual attacks in Frankfurt on New Year's Eve 2015–16 took place on or near the Eiserner Steg ("iron footbridge") in the city centre. In one incident a group of ten "North African" men sexually assaulted three women, in another incident three men harassed and indecently touched a group of four women and stole a phone from them. In September 2016, 60 reports of sexual harassment of women in Frankfurt on New Year's Eve, mostly perpetrated by groups, mostly on the Eiserner Steg or the banks of the river Main, had been brought before the Frankfurter Staatsanwaltschaft (state attorney).

Bielefeld – On New Year's Eve, hundreds of people were partying on the Boulevard of Bielefeld, among them 150 persons with a migrant background, stated the police. A 23-year-old female student described how she, while heading for the cinema on the Boulevard of Bielefeld with two female friends, suddenly was surrounded by a group of eight to ten men who did not speak any German: "Everywhere there were men, who kissed me, on the forehead, on the cheeks, on the mouth". With her friend's help, she escaped; they immediately turned to a police officer in the area, where they saw two weeping girls who told they had been similarly detained by men.

Dortmund – The first two reported sexual harassment incidents in Dortmund on New Year's Eve 2015–16 took place in the city centre, where "several" men had emerged from a much larger crowd of men, approached two women who together were passing by. In one incident these men surrounded the women, in both incidents touching them indecently and either insulting them or making sexual allusions.

Düsseldorf – During New Year's Eve 2015–16 in Düsseldorf, four incidents were reported to the police in which offences were committed by groups, but these were not obviously sexually motivated. After midnight, groups of men sexually assaulted women, mostly along the banks of the river Rhine and on the Bolkerstraße in Düsseldorf, mostly in larger crowds or in queues in front of clubs. The offenders cooperated in cornering women, who subsequently were groped in their private parts and breasts, in some cases very brutally. Only as of 4 January 2016, after the news about Cologne was widely published, did reports about such sexual assaults reach the Düsseldorf police. By 21 January 2016, most of the then-70 reported sexual assaults in Düsseldorf on New Year's Eve were reported to have taken place in three adjacent boroughs in the city centre (District 1): Altstadt, Stadtmitte and Carlstadt.

== Criticism of media and government coverage ==
Critics have accused the government and media of not adequately reporting the events to avoid talking about the controversial topic of the suspects' ethnicities. Well-known newspapers, such as Süddeutsche Zeitung or Die Welt, have reported on the hesitation shown by the police. The latter stated, on January 10, 2016, that "for a week, the truth about the New Year's Eve in Cologne was only available under the counter. Piece by piece, it came to light, because police officers who had been deployed began to talk."

Although the Cologne police directly mentioned the "North African appearance" of the suspects in their first press release about the sexual assaults on 2 January 2016, local and national news media appeared to have avoided reporting on attackers' ethnicity until the evening of 4 January. The local newspaper Kölner Stadt-Anzeiger on 1 January at 13:21 reported sexual harassment on New Year's Eve near the Central Train Station, and so did the Cologne paper Express that day at 21:08, but neither mentioned ethnicity of the perpetrators.

After the police press conference in Cologne on 4 January 2016 at 14:00, where the police president squarely stated that men "from appearance largely from the North African or Arab world" had committed "a very large number of sexual assaults", the prominent Süddeutsche Zeitung in its first account on its website at 15:58 still did not mention that ethnicity of the suspects. The public-service TV broadcaster ZDF at 19:00 that day, in its news bulletin Heute, completely skipped the item of the Cologne sex assaults because they had not yet found an eyewitness confirming the alleged ethnicity of the assailants.

The national news media started reporting the ethnicity of suspects on the evening of 4 January 2016: news website The Local at 19:23, TV broadcaster ARD at 20:00 in their news bulletin Tagesschau, the Süddeutsche Zeitung at 20:19 in an adapted report on their website. ZDF on 5 January apologized for their not-reporting on 4 January:

The available information was clear enough. We've been negligent in not at least mentioning the events on 4 January in the 19:00 'Heute' bulletin. The editorial staff however decided to postpone their report to the next day when a crisis meeting was planned, to win time for extra interviews. This was clearly a misjudgement.

=== Accusations and suspicions of a media cover-up ===
Because of the perception that the ethnic and religious background of the Muslim assailants had been reported 'too late' by the mass media (see above), anger and accusations arose on Twitter and other social networking sites as of the afternoon of 4 January 2016, holding that 'the national media' or 'the news media' had been engaged in a cover-up of these New Year's Eve events or had deliberately under-reported them, for fear of encouraging anti-immigrant or anti-refugee sentiments. Former Interior Minister Hans-Peter Friedrich (CSU) on 5 January suggested that "the public media" for days had ignored the events, and more commentators and right-wing politicians criticized the press. The existing complaints about the ‘Lügenpresse’ ("lying press") – a term which already in 2015, 39% of German adults did not fully reject – were invigorated on the social networking sites.

News website The Local on 5 January suggested that "the national media" had only started to report on the ethnicity of the assaulters because they were forced to do so by "social media". The German political scientist Klaus Schroeder in an interview on 6 January 2016 confirmed that, until 4 January, prominent German newspapers had indeed kept negative news about migrants away from their readers, to avoid driving the public "into the hands of the extreme right". An analyst in Die Zeit has suggested that until 4 January 2016, those national media had suppressed reporting the ethnicity of suspects from New Year's Eve because the press codex in force ordered them to do so. Since those New Year's Eve events, that press codex has been revised in 2017, and both political scientist Schroeder and newspaper Die Zeit have suggested that since 4 January 2016, the German mainstream media may now mention an ethnic background of crime suspects more easily.

The discontent in Germany in January 2016 over 'the media' was echoed by the Polish Minister of Justice Zbigniew Ziobro on 9 January 2016, and by the Russian newspaper Rossiyskaya Gazeta who contended that Berlin pretended that nothing out of the ordinary had happened; regional and national German media then demonstrated an astonishing solidarity with the politicians by refusing "to illuminate the extent of robberies, assaults and rapes committed by refugees".

=== Criticism of authorities, government, and police ===
In addition to the distrust towards national news media, political commentators and right-wing politicians accused the authorities or police of trying to cover-up or ignore the New Year's Eve sexual attacks or the ethnic background of the suspects to avoid fueling a backlash against the refugees or migrants who had recently arrived in Germany in great numbers, and nearly all German press were wondering whether such political correctness had played a role in 'slow' reporting of the attacks by the police.

Such suspicions towards government and media were enhanced by the specifically German memories of the racial policies of the German Nazi regime (1933–45) and the existing political controversy over Germany's 'open-door policy' towards refugees in 2015, which made criticism of the presence or the behaviour of ethnic minorities highly delicate.

The suspicion of a governmental cover-up proved partly correct in April 2016, when it was discovered that after a first preliminary report of the Cologne police of 2 January 2016, mentioning "rape, sexual assaults and thefts carried out by a large group of foreign nationals" on the New Year's Eve, the North Rhine-Westphalian Interior Ministry telephoned the Cologne police, asking them to tone down the report and remove the word 'rape' from it.

Agitation against the German government was echoed by the Polish and Russian governments. On 7 January 2016, Poland's Foreign Minister Witold Waszczykowski contended that the German government had presumably tried to conceal the events.

== Speculation that the attacks were premeditated ==
The fact that the sexual attackers on New Year's Eve in Cologne – and later in Hamburg, Stuttgart, Frankfurt, Bielefeld, Dortmund, Paderborn and Borken – had allegedly often worked in groups, in sizes from 2 up to 100 men, quickly led to speculations that those attacks had been organized. On 5 January 2016, the German Minister of Justice Heiko Maas (SPD) declared that these sex crimes were "organized crime" and also the police that day reckoned with the possibility that the attacks had been planned. On a ZDF TV broadcast on 6 January, Minister Maas toned down his earlier assessment, but repeated that "It all seems to have been agreed upon."

On 8 January 2016, it was discovered by police that one of the suspects had prepared himself for contacting or harassing women, with Arabic–German translations written on a piece of paper for phrases like: "beautiful breasts", "I want sex with you", and "I kill you". Ralf Jäger, Minister of the Interior of North Rhine-Westphalia, on 21 January, nevertheless dismissed the suggestion of premeditated organized attacks: "...groups of men had agreed via social networking sites to meet at the Cologne New Year's Eve celebrations, but there was no information so far that the perpetrators had agreed upon the assaults before New Year's Eve, nor that the groups of offenders had been structured hierarchically," Jäger said. On 11 February 2016, the new Cologne police chief, Jürgen Mathies, also rejected the idea of organized crime. The gathering of young men at the central train station came about organically via social networking sites. "There's nothing that hints at organized crime. Rather it is so that such sexual assaults by groups are also a huge problem in, for example, Cairo. These perpetrators probably knew this behaviour, of surrounding and then abusing women with many other men from their country of descent," said Mathies. The tabloid website Daily Express nevertheless kept suggesting that the "Cologne mass sex attack 'was organised and plotted on social media', says police chief".

== Descriptions of offenders before their identification ==
Stuttgart – In the first reported case of sexual assault on New Year's Eve 2015–16 in Stuttgart, reported on 3 January 2016 by a local newspaper, the attackers were described as a group of "southern people" with "Arab" looks.

Cologne – The police president of Cologne, Wolfgang Albers, on 4 January 2016 at a press conference described the offenders of the sexual assaults in the New Year's Eve in Cologne as young men "from appearance largely from the north African or Arab world", after all witnesses had given that racial description to the police. Albers also stated that many of the offenders had been known to the police for some time, therefore were not newly arrived refugees. On 5 January, Albers estimated the ages of the offenders as between 15 and 35 or between 18 and 35.

Hamburg – The Hamburg police in its announcement on 5 January 2016 described the perpetrators of the sexual harassment on New Year's Eve as men "with southern or Arab looks" "in some cases", operating in groups of perhaps 20 to 40 persons. The Hamburger Abendblatt stated on 20 January that "most of the victims have supposedly described the perpetrators as southerners (Südländer), North Africans, or people with dark skin". Of the first eight identified suspects of sexual offences in Hamburg on New Year's Eve, some were refugees, while others had a migration background, said the police on 14 January 2016.

Dortmund – Several of the perpetrators of sexual attacks on New Year's Eve 2015–16 in Dortmund were described on 5 January as speaking broken German or broken English.

Frankfurt – The victims of the first 22 reported sexual attacks on New Year's Eve 2015–16 in Frankfurt described the perpetrators, between 5 and 11 January, as groups of men from Arab or north African origin.

Bielefeld – All six women who had been sexually harassed in Bielefeld on New Year's Eve 2015–16 described their harassers as men with migration backgrounds; these same men were described by the police on 6 January as "immigrants", mostly Algerians and Moroccans.

Düsseldorf – On 8 January 2016, all 41 victims in Düsseldorf of sexual attacks on New Year's Eve described their assailants as North African or Arab in appearance. By 14 January, in nearly all 48 reported cases, the perpetrators had been described by the witnesses as "Arab", "North African" or "southern".

Further German cities – Several women who reported having been sexually harassed in Paderborn on New Year's Eve 2015–16 described the perpetrators as "North African" men; two victims in Detmold described the offenders as "foreign" looking men. The federal state of Hesse described some of the perpetrators of sexual assaults in its cities that New Year's Eve as men with "north African/Arab" appearance.

== Confusion over the role of refugees ==
All of Germany
In July 2016, the Bundeskriminalamt (German Federal Criminal Police) stated that approximately half of the 120 identified suspects nationwide of sexual violence on New Year's Eve appeared to have come to Germany in 2015 with the great flow of refugees which that year had reached Germany, and most of the suspects came from North Africa. The Bundeskriminalamt further explained that in their terminology, asylum seekers, people granted asylum, and people only on sufferance (Duldung) in the country (because expulsion had not yet occurred), are all referred to as "refugees".

Cologne
On 4 January 2016, Cologne's police president Wolfgang Albers stated that many of the offenders of the sexual assaults on New Year's Eve had been known to the police for some time; therefore, they were not newly arrived refugees, which he contradicted the next day by saying that the police "has no knowledge yet about the offenders".

On 5 January, Cologne mayor Henriette Reker said in a press conference that there were no indications of "refugees" being among the perpetrators of the sexual assaults, and that presumptions of that sort were "completely intolerable"; she judged it "completely improper (...) to link a group that appeared to come from North Africa with the refugees" who had arrived in record numbers in Germany in the year 2015. However, Arnold Plickert, President of the German police union Gewerkschaft der Polizei in North Rhine-Westphalia, said on 7 January that "there were most certainly refugees among the perpetrators".

On 8 January, 31 suspects of various offences during New Year's Eve in Cologne had been identified: 18 of them appeared to be asylum seekers, according to the Federal Ministry of the Interior. The same day, several of the mobile phones stolen in the New Year's Eve were traced by the police within or in the vicinity of refugees' residences.

On around 15 February, the British online newspaper The Independent stated that of the first 73 identified suspects accused of robbing or sexually harassing women or committing other offences on New Year's Eve in Cologne, only three were refugees. Cologne's chief prosecutor Bremer angrily protested against that view, stating that the great majority of them were either asylum seekers, asylum applicants, or illegal immigrants which he considered all to "fall into the general category of refugees". In June 2016, the Bundeskriminalamt (German Federal Criminal Police Office) further explained, that the majority of the men harassing women on the Cathedral Plaza in Cologne in the New Year's Eve had been of north African or Arab origin and most offenders in Cologne had come to Germany as refugees in 2015, and that in the police's terminology, asylum seekers, people granted asylum, and people only on sufferance in the country (because expulsion had not yet occurred), are all referred to as "refugees".

Hamburg – Some of the first eight identified suspects in the New Year's Eve sexual assaults in Hamburg were identified as "refugees" according to the police on 14 January 2016.

Frankfurt – The first ten arrested suspects of sexual attacks on New Year's Eve 2015–16 in Frankfurt were all refugees, said the Frankfurter police on 11 January.

Detmold – Two reported rape attempts on New Year's Eve 2015–16 in Detmold, by "foreign" looking men, were reported as having taken place "in direct vicinity of a refugees' shelter".

Borken (NRW) – Two reported sexual assaults on girls in Borken (North Rhine-Westphalia) on New Year's Eve 2015–16 were attributed by police to "several asylum seekers".

== Comparisons and interpretations ==
=== Tahrir Square ===
See also subsection 'Bundeskriminalamt: a combination of six factors'

Newspapers on 4 and 5 January 2016 immediately pointed out that, although massive sexual harassment was unknown in modern Germany and Europe, the Cologne New Year's Eve events strongly resembled mass sexual assaults on Tahrir Square in Cairo, Egypt, during political mass demonstrations in 2005, 2006 and 2013. The Bundeskriminalamt (German Federal Criminal Police Office) on 10 January asserted that the phenomenon of communal sexual harassment is known in several Arab countries, where it purportedly is called taharrush gamea. In February 2016, new Cologne police chief Jürgen Mathies stated, "Such sexual assaults by groups are also a huge problem in, for example, Cairo. These perpetrators probably knew this behaviour of surrounding and then abusing women with many other men from their country of descent".

In January 2016, an Iranian-American writer and student of anthropology Shams had put in perspective suggestions from Western commentators that mass sexual harassment is part of Arab culture, saying that such sexual harassment is not common practice in Egypt or in other parts of the Arab world, where it is as shocking to average people as anywhere else.

=== Comparison to violence on other celebrations from native German-born men ===
On 6 January 2016, during a women's discussion in Cologne, one of them contended that the sexual harassment on New Year's Eve had not been different from the violence during other big celebrations in the city, and that it had only become a burning topic for the media this time because "refugees" or "migrants", who had recently become a controversial issue in Germany, were the accused perpetrators this time, instead of native German-born men. Likewise, two female journalists, in a column in Time on 11 January, noted that the public discussions since "Cologne" had quickly focused on migrants and Muslim men not being adjusted to Western culture, and had thus become one more fight with men against other men, thereby ignoring the fact that sexual harassment during public festivals in Germany had become an urgent problem in recent years. Likewise, on 13 January, 22 German feminists pleaded in an open letter that the anger after the Cologne incidents should not be directed against groups or ethnicities like Muslims, Arabs, blacks, and North Africans; sexualised violence is omnipresent every day and not only a problem of 'the others' who are not white 'non-Germans'.

=== Sexual assault as a tactic for robbery ===
On 2 January 2016, when nearly 30 complaints about robbery and/or sexual assault in Cologne during New Year's Eve had reached the Cologne police, the police had presumed, via a press release, that the suspects had used sexual groping as a mere tactic to distract women, while at the same time robbing these same women of mobile phones and wallets. Five days later, several Cologne police officers anonymously told the press their contrasting view, which was that most of the sexual perpetrators had been groping or assaulting primarily for their "sexual amusement".

=== Inadequate police response ===
See also subsection 'Bundeskriminalamt: a combination of six factors'

On 11 January 2016, the North Rhine-Westphalian Minister-President Kraft (SPD) and North Rhine-Westphalian Interior Minister Jäger (SPD) criticised the Cologne police for not having requested police reinforcements which they said had been on standby on New Year's Eve. After parliamentary inquiries lasting from March until November 2016, the SPD fraction in the North Rhine-Westphalian state parliament concluded again that "the deployment of the security forces in the Silvesternacht (New Year's Night) in Cologne had gone wrong, with grave consequences for the women affected".

The Dutch news website De Correspondent analysed, that considering the crowded situation near Cologne's central train station in the NYE, the police forces’ coordination had been inadequate.

=== Bundeskriminalamt: a combination of six factors ===
A report from the end of February 2016 by the Bundeskriminalamt (Federal Criminal Police) analyzing hundreds of cases of alleged sexual assault in Cologne, Hamburg, Düsseldorf, Frankfurt am Main, and Stuttgart on New Year's Eve, which was made public in June 2016, mentioned factors that seem to have favoured those sexual assaults (by groups):

- In North Africa and Middle East– where most of the suspects presumably have cultural roots – sexual assault or harassment by groups of men is, according to the Bundeskriminalamt, a widespread form of everyday violence against women, especially in "economically weak" countries and in "crisis regions". According to the Bundeskriminalamt, this is called taharrush gamea or taḥarrush jamāʿī in Egypt;
- Group pressure and imitating behaviour, after seeing a large number of sexual assaults by others already taking place;
- Disinhibition from the special occasion of New Year's Eve, as well as by the effects of alcohol or drugs;
- Disinhibition from the absence of family and social security, and by the lack of integration in labour or in the school system;
- Absence of visible intervention by police forces, giving potential perpetrators the impression that they would get away with their sexual assaults unpunished;
- Frustration and aggression, caused by a long-lasting lack of perspective due to the diminished possibilities for obtaining asylum and work.

== Further reactions ==
=== Shock ===
The President of the German police union Gewerkschaft der Polizei in North Rhine-Westphalia, Arnold Plickert, said on 4 January 2016 over the sexual attacks in Cologne: "This is a totally new dimension of violence. Such a thing was unknown to us, until now"; the strongly alcoholized perpetrators had acted "fully unleashed violent". Shock dominated the headlines of the German newspapers of 4 and 5 January.

On 5 January, also Cologne's police chief Albers called the sex attacks "a completely new dimension of crime", but the German Justice Minister Heiko Maas (SPD) that day went even further, declaring these assaults a "completely new dimension of organized criminality". A Frankfurt police spokesman reacted on 6 January 2016: "The phenomenon of large groups of men massively sexually harassing women in this manner was unknown to us until now".

=== Suggestions to close the German borders ===
A Member of the German Parliament for the CDU party, Steffen Bilger, wrote on Twitter in the evening of 4 January 2016, reacting on 'Cologne': "It can't go on like this. Urgently needed: reduction of influx".

Ross Douthat, a columnist for The New York Times, on 9 January 2016 advised Germany to close its borders for new immigrants for the time being, because:

- ordinary Germans don't want the generous immigration policies which led to one million immigrants in 2015
- immigrants will have difficulties in assimilation
- immigrants will commit violence and terrorism, see the recent attacks in Paris (January 2015 and November 2015), see now 'Cologne'
- immigrants in such high numbers could Islamificate Europe
- many among the large numbers of young immigrated men in Europe and Germany in 2015 hold unacceptable views on women.

On 12 January, Hans-Jürgen Papier, former head of the German Federal Constitutional Court, stated that the government should separate its granting of asylum from its migration policies and "secure the borders" of Germany. On 19 January 2016, the German Minister of Transportation Alexander Dobrindt of the Bavarian CSU party also recommended closure of the German borders.

=== Hardening attitudes towards migrants and refugees ===
Von Mengersen, head of the nationalist Pro NRW party in Germany, reacted on 4 or 5 January 2016, recalling the recent large influx of migrants into Germany: "We locals can no longer put up with everything that is being routinely swept under the rug based on a false sense of tolerance". Other far-right and anti-immigrant groups gave similar reactions that day. The liberal conservative German magazine Cicero, in more guarded terms, blamed the migrants by suggesting "the government's loss of control" on who enters Germany had caused these New Year's Eve's sexual assaults.

U.S. presidential candidate Donald Trump tweeted on 6 January: "Germany is going through massive attacks to its people by the migrants (...)". The German CSU's secretary-general Andreas Scheuer between 4 and 9 January tweeted: "It is unbearable that in major German cities, women are sexually assaulted and robbed in the street by young migrants"; the CDU had between 4 and 9 January proposed in a draft announcement that allegedly suspicious refugees should be taken into custody. The Prime Minister of Slovakia, Robert Fico, on 7 January said he would make a concentrated effort to prevent Muslim migrants from entering Slovakia. The Czech Prime Minister Bohuslav Sobotka on 8 January supported Fico's proposal. On 8 January, Fico added that "The migrants cannot be integrated". The Belgian immigration minister on 8 January ordered migrants to take courses in "respect for women".

On 7 January, the North Rhine-Westphalian Interior Minister Ralf Jäger said that anti-immigrant groups were using the New Year's Eve sex assaults to stir up hatred against refugees: "What happens on the right-wing platforms and in chat rooms is at least as awful as the acts of those assaulting the women...This is poisoning the climate of our society."

On 9 January, German Chancellor Angela Merkel promised tougher action and measures against criminals of foreign nationality, and on 11 January she reacted to the sex attacks, saying: "Refugees are coming to Europe and we are vulnerable, as we see (...)".

On 11 January, at a rally in Leipzig organized by Pegida, banner signs read: "Rapefugees not welcome".

On 12 January 2016, research by online Internet research firm YouGov showed that the percentage of Germans who consider the number of asylum seekers in Germany "too high" had sharply risen from 53% in November 2015 to 62% in the period of 8–11 January 2016.

=== "An arm's length distance" statement ===
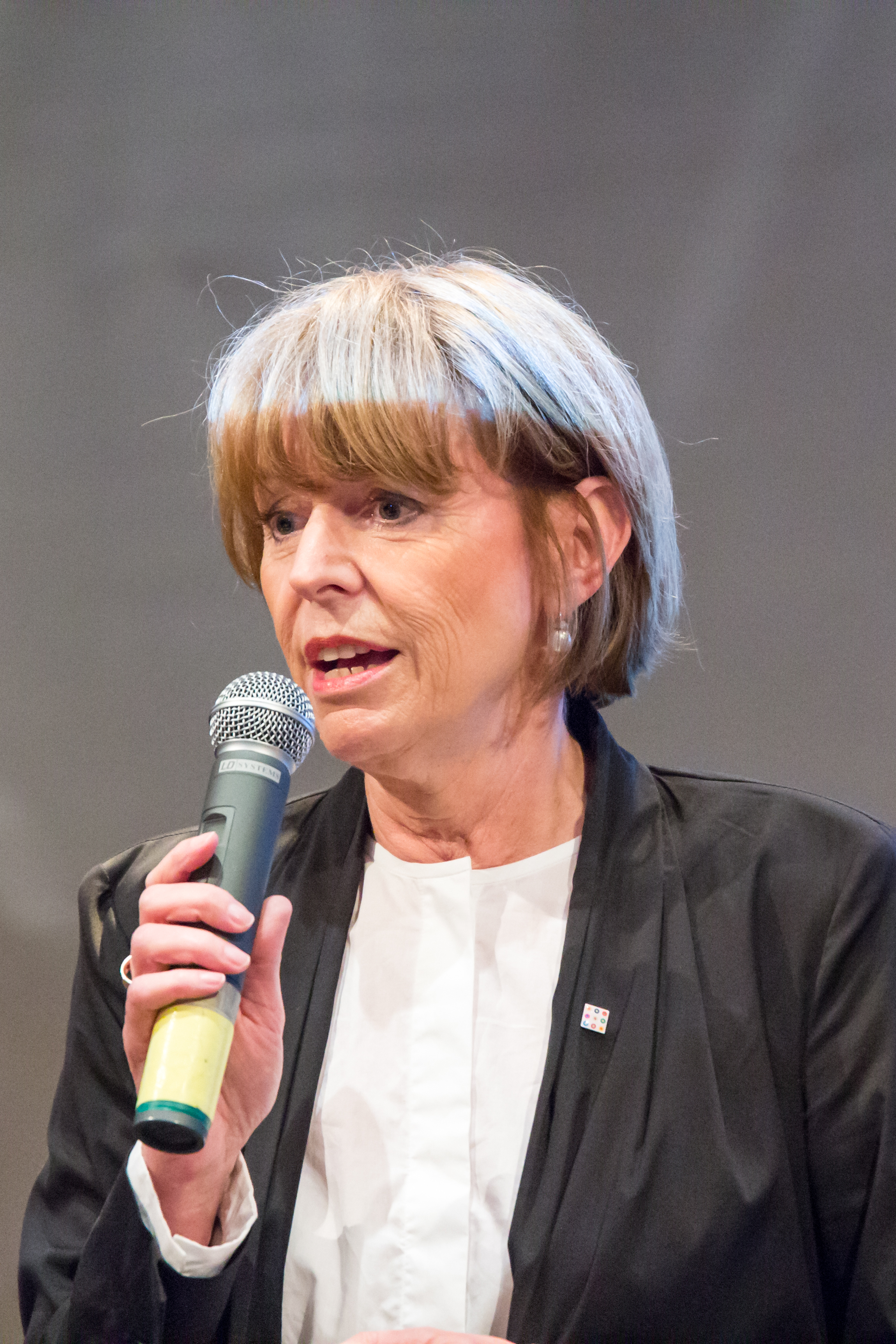
Cologne's mayor Henriette Reker

In a press conference in the afternoon of 5 January 2016, Cologne's mayor Henriette Reker (nonpartisan politician) – who herself had been attacked with a knife and gravely wounded 2 1/2 months earlier – after being asked how women could protect themselves from assaults like those on New Year's Eve, answered that women should keep "an arm's length distance" from people with whom they don't know well. This drew outrage not only on social media, but even from the government of the Netherlands, suggesting that Reker had blamed the victims with her remark.

=== Demonstrations against sexual violence ===
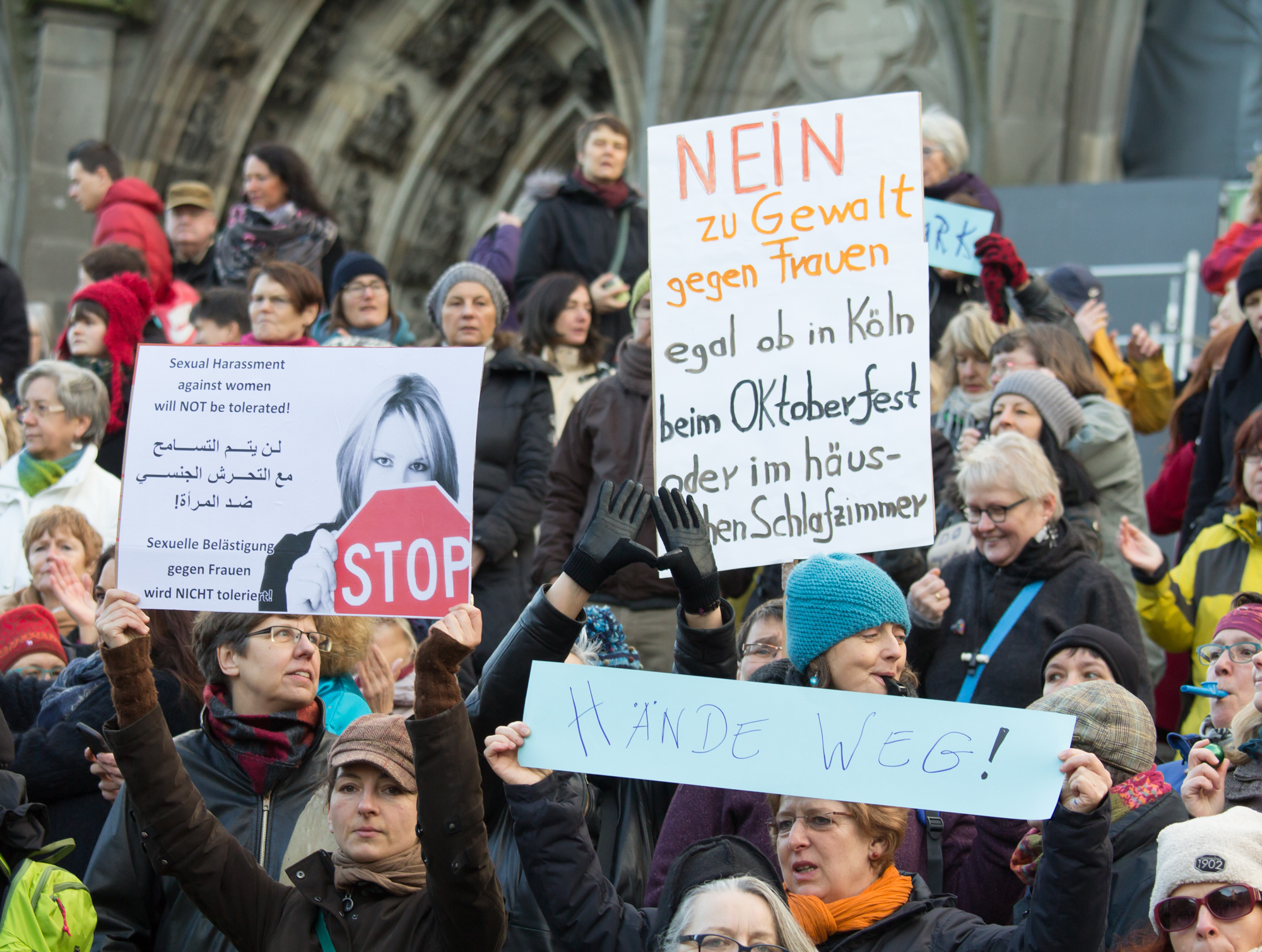
Demonstration outside Cologne Cathedral, 9 January 2016, with a sign reading: "No to violence against women, in Cologne as well as at the Oktoberfest or in the sleeping room at home"

In the evening of 5 January 2016, between 200 and 300 people, mostly women, protested outside the Cologne Cathedral, demanding respect for women and action from Chancellor Angela Merkel. On 9 January, a second flashmob demonstration took place, on the forecourt and steps of the Cologne cathedral, against "violence against women", by at least a thousand men and women.

=== Deportation ===
In reaction to the sexual assaults, Hannelore Kraft (SPD), Minister-President of North Rhine-Westphalia, said on 5 January 2016 that perpetrators should be deported if possible. On 8 January, vice chancellor for the SPD and Minister for Economics Sigmar Gabriel fell in line with these sentiments, saying: "criminal asylum applicants [should be] sent back to their homeland" and Hamburg's mayor Olaf Scholz (SPD) also advocated faster deportation of criminal migrants, specifically the perpetrators of these New Year's Eve assaults. On 9 January, the rival German centre party CDU went even further, saying that migrants sentenced to imprisonment on probation should, under current circumstances, be deported too. In July 2016, Germany's parliament passed a new law on sex crimes which would make it easier to deport a migrant after committing a sex offence.

=== More police and video surveillance ===
North Rhine-Westphalian Interior Minister Ralf Jäger (SPD) said on 7 January 2016 that the police have to learn from these events and "conceptually adjust" to the fact that groups of men can assault women en masse. In July 2016, the Bundeskriminalamt (German Federal Criminal Police) President Mönch demanded more police presence and video surveillance in response to these assaults.

=== Anti-Muslim and anti-Islam sentiment ===
The Prime Minister of Slovakia, Robert Fico, said on 7 January 2016 he would make a concentrated effort to prevent Muslim migrants from entering Slovakia. On 8 January, the Czech Prime Minister Bohuslav Sobotka supported Fico's proposal.

On 10 January, journalist Harald Martenstein wrote in Der Tagesspiegel: "An Islamic socialization produces a conception of women that often leads to such crimes".

On 11 January, at a rally in Leipzig organized by Pegida, banner signs read: "Islam not welcome".

In May 2016, the German journalist, publisher, and feminist Alice Schwarzer wrote that the assailants from the Cologne New Year's Eve attacks had been "fanaticized followers of Sharia Islam...they were not average Muslims [but] the type of men who place sharia above the law and the woman below the man...Most of the German Muslim organizations have been busying themselves in recent decades with infiltrating the sharia into our legal system". President Kaddor of the German Liberal Islamic Society retorted that Schwarzer is doing "what many Islam-hostile instigators do." The usage of the term 'Sharia-Islam' shows that Schwarzer is not interested in clarifying, but just in using provocative language, said Kaddor. She dismissed the charge of trying to infiltrate the German legal system with sharia as "nonsense".

But, next to such statements made by political actors, the media has also played an essential role in the expansion of the racist public discourse that followed the events in Cologne. One important problem of the media portrayal of the 2015 New Year’s Eve is that sexual attacks have been particularly connected to Islam in many newspapers. In January 2016, the German newspaper Focus has talked about a ‘chronology of horror in Cologne’ and dangerous suspects from North-Africa who are often referred to as Nafris and are said to be responsible for theft, rape, and violence towards German women. In February, the same newspaper published a statement by a German expert on Syria who associates Arabic men to a ‘culture of violence’, whereby the events of New Year’s Eve may just have been the beginning. Accordingly, the media has presented the sexual attacks against women in Cologne as being part of the culture and religion of Muslim men. Thereby, the media additionally portrays Muslim men as ‘Others’ who do not belong to the Western world of liberal values by referring to their cultural and religious beliefs. In another article of the newspaper Focus, the author declares that most refugees do not have any occupational qualifications and therefore present a burden. In an article published by the German newspaper Bild in January 2016, there are several statements that put Islam in contrast to the Western world to emphasize that both cultures are incompatible.

Generally, the press places European values in opposition to Islamic values, as shown by a statement of a German Member of the Parliament published the German newspaper FAZ. He explains that migrants need to realize that they have not come to a ‘value-neutral societal system’ but that Germany, in contrast to their home countries, is a progressive country with fundamental values that everyone must respect. This media representation of Muslim men as sexist and aggressive criminals has provoked an increasingly discriminating discourse among the population. This has induced the public perception of refugees as violent ‘Others’ who do neither fit to the German culture, nor to the European world of values, having led to a ‘global Islamophobia’ with xenophobic articles about that night available in almost every country. Whereas sexual attacks of Germans have been underrepresented in the period following the New Year’s Eve, such crimes committed by refugees have almost always been in the news. This is one reason that may have led to an increased propensity to violence by Germans towards migrants.

=== Suggestion of terrorist links to the European migrant crisis ===
On 7 January 2016, Poland's Foreign Minister Witold Waszczykowski contended that the migration wave to Europe, which he linked to the Cologne events, had been used by ISIL or other terrorist organizations.

=== Suggestions to secure the 'Schengen' borders ===
On 8 January 2016, the Prime Minister of Hungary, Viktor Orbán, called for a complete halt to migration into Europe. If borders of the Schengen Zone are not controlled, the Schengen system (i.e. free movement of people within the participating countries) will collapse, he said.

On 15 January, the German Minister of Finance, Wolfgang Schäuble (CDU), also stated that: "We must now secure the outer Schengen borders".

Economics Professor Emeritus Hans-Werner Sinn, ranked by several papers as one of the leading German intellectuals, reacted on 1 February 2016 to "the Cologne New Year's Eve events", stating: Germany, because of its history, has a lasting obligation to protect those who are politically persecuted, but not to put up with a massive and uncontrolled rush of economic refugees. If a state, for example Germany, neglects to effectively protect its borders and thus to protect its public assets and its social security system, chaos, violence and inefficiency would damage that state to such a degree that it could no longer fulfil its aforementioned humanitary assignments. In the current situation though, with Germany being part of the Schengen Area, it would suffice for Germany if the outer borders of that Schengen Zone were effectively protected, which presently would require most of all protecting the Schengen outer borders of Italy and Slovenia. Italy, Sinn suggested, should bring the refugees back to Africa as – according to Sinn – Spain was already doing; Slovenia should be assisted in securing its outside Schengen border. On those controlled outer Schengen borders, reception camps for arriving asylum applicants could then be erected, and the asylum applicants qualifying there for asylum according to uniform European asylum criteria could be distributed over those Schengen countries willing to accept their share of them.

=== Criticism of racism in reactions ===
The Süddeutsche Zeitung newspaper published on Saturday, 9 January 2016 an illustration of a black arm reaching up between white female legs, which has been criticised as racism by other media and journalists. The Süddeutsche apologised for it the next day.

On its 9 January front cover, the German magazine Focus showed a naked blonde white woman, stained by black handprints all over her body, accompanied by the text: "After the sex attacks by migrants: Are we still tolerant or already blind?" On 11 January, columnist Jakob Augstein, writing in Spiegel Online, denounced this as an implicit racist message, suggesting: 'it's okay for white men to abuse white women, but not for men of the other human racial groupings'. Al Jazeera America condemned the cover image as a "racist machination as archaic as the tale of Shakespeare's Othello". A similar picture was published on the cover of the Polish weekly paper Sieci in early 2016: a blonde woman, wrapped in the European flag, grabbed from several sides by dark, hairy arms. The title of the linked article was "The Islamic rape of Europe".

=== Satire ===
The French satirical magazine Charlie Hebdo on 13 January 2016 published a cartoon, recalling the Kurdish-Syrian three-year-old boy Alan Kurdi who, in September 2015, while fleeing with his family from the Syrian civil war, had drowned in the Mediterranean Sea. The dramatic photo of his dead body, published by nearly every serious news medium in the Western world, had elicited on the one hand awe and commiseration, and on the other hand irritation at 'dead-child porn for progressives'. Charlie Hebdo pictured Alan Kurdi as a grown-up man lecherously chasing a running blonde woman. The accompanying text goes: "Migrants. Que sérait devenu le petit Aylan s'il avait grandi? Tripoteur de fesses en Allemagne" ("Migrants. What would little Aylan have grown up to be? Ass groper in Germany").

=== Remarks that the federal government had suspended the constitutional state ===
Two professors of constitutional law and former members of the German Federal Constitutional Court, Udo Di Fabio and Hans-Jürgen Papier, remarked on 14 January 2016 that the federal government had suspended the constitutional state by unconditionally opening the country's borders in 2015.

=== Muslim Imam purportedly blames the victims ===
On 17 January 2016, in an interview with Russian television channel REN TV, Sami Abu-Yusuf, a Salafist Muslim imam based in Cologne, blamed the victims for being sexually assaulted by Muslim men from North Africa, because of "the way were dressed", and they had been "walking around 'half-naked' and perfumed", which according to him justified the North African Muslim men groping and raping them.

The imam later protested in a German newspaper that his words had been taken out of context, and that he had only tried to explain the assaults, without justifying them. He argued that they resulted from women being scantily dressed and wearing perfume, along with young men being disinhibited by drugs, or alcohol.

=== Germany facing migration challenge ===
Within weeks, it was clear that most suspects of the sexual assaults had come from North Africa. Analyst Michelle Martin, for website reuters.com on 28 January 2016, considered that Germany appeared "unprepared for the migration challenge":

"300,000–500,000 young men, without families in Germany, sitting around without much to do, having come from a male-dominated culture" in North Africa, as a German criminologist and former justice minister from the SPD party had put it. Also, these men were not legally permitted to work. Virtually none of them was entitled asylum as a 'genuine refugee'. About 40% of migrants from North Africa in Germany committed a crime within a year, said a North Rhine-Westphalia police report from 8 January 2016. These young men had arrived with high hopes for life in "paradise", but soon found out all they got was a bed and a small stipend, as the vice-president of the German Moroccan society described it. Thus, these men were vulnerable to being "corrupted by a ringleader who says: let's rob the department store or steal a mobile phone or clothes, and we'll have a bit of money when we sell them".

=== Suggestion that a wrong perception has taken hold ===
In May 2016, the Dutch news website De Correspondent, in an analysis of the publicity since 4 January 2016, suggested that an incorrect public perception of the Cologne attacks, as "a mob of 1,000 refugees going after the women of Germany", had taken hold in the first three days and never went away. It suggested as a more accurate perception, that only "dozens" of young men were suspected of sexual assaults in Cologne.

=== "An end to euphoria" ===
Two years later in 2018, the editorial staff of the Spiegel Online magazine postulated that the events of Cologne's 2015–16 New Year's Eve had ended "the sense of euphoria that had accompanied the welcoming of hundreds of thousands of refugees into Germany in 2015".

== Responses (in actions) ==
=== Pepper spray, weapons licences ===
Immediately after 4 January 2016 reports about Cologne, sales to women of pepper spray for self-defense exploded in Germany. In the first three weeks of January 2016, requests for small weapons licences (Kleiner Waffenschein) in Cologne and Leverkusen doubled in comparison to the previous year.

=== Vigilante committee ===
In Düsseldorf, where later 103 complaints over sexual offences in the New Year's Eve would be registered, a vigilante group was founded on 5 January 2016 in reaction to the then published events in Cologne. The Facebook page of this Düsseldorf passt auf ("Düsseldorf Watches Out") group garnered 3,300 members within two days.

=== Cologne police chief discharged ===
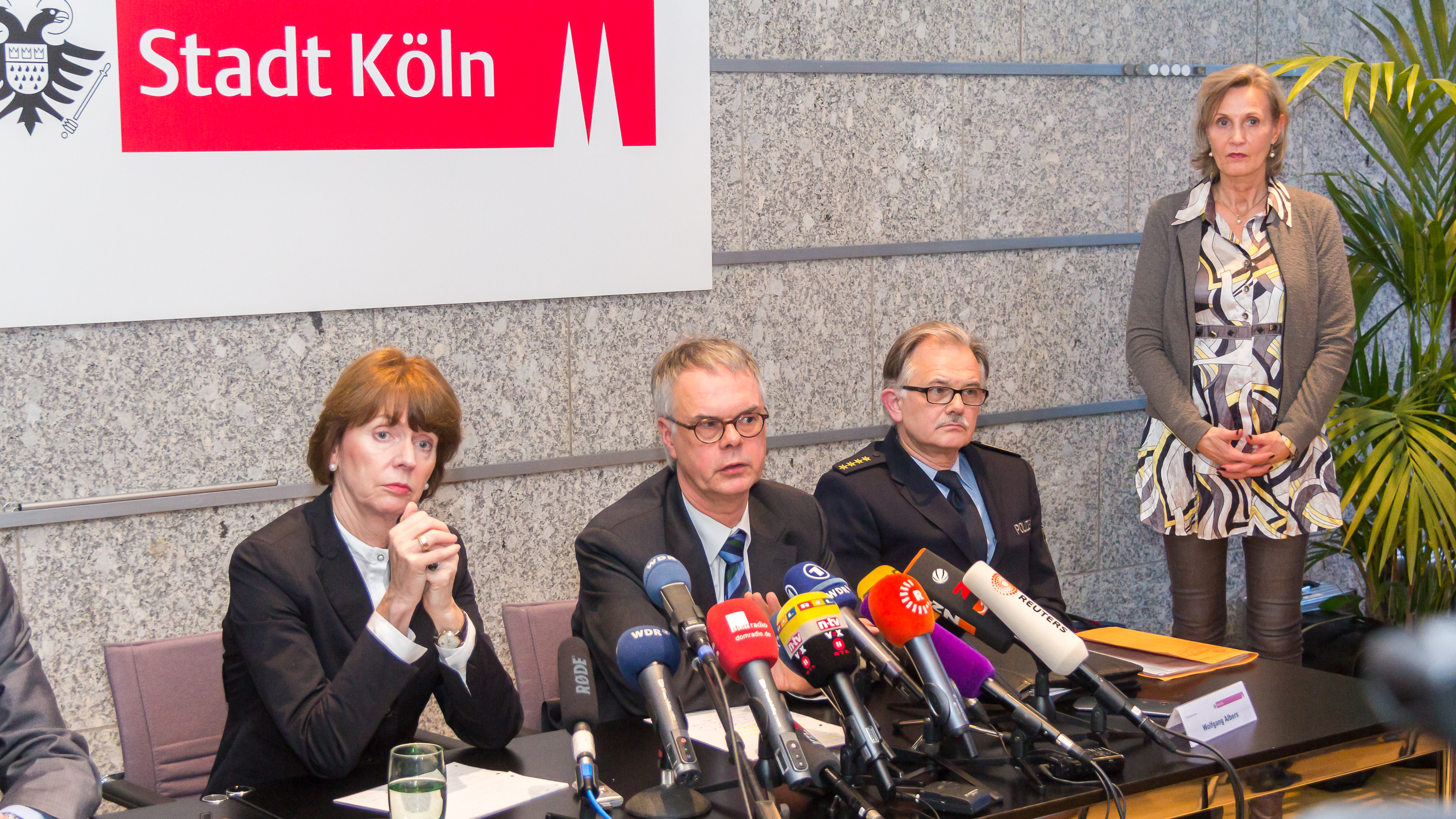
Cologne mayor Henriette Reker (l.) and Cologne police chief Wolfgang Albers (c.) in the press conference in Cologne, 5 January 2016

Cologne's chief of police Wolfgang Albers was soon criticized, also bearing in mind his questionable performance in two affairs in previous years. On 6 January 2016, the FDP's leader Christian Lindner bluntly stated: "Cologne needs a new start for security, also regarding personnel".

On 8 January, even the German Police Trade Union's president Rainer Wendt severely criticized Albers, saying the chief of police together with the police force under his responsibility had caused a communication disaster by first stating the New Year's Eve had passed calmly, later having to admit this first information had been wrong. The same day, Cologne's mayor Reker accused Albers of holding information from her, not informing her that 58% of the first 31 suspects of various offences in the New Year's Eve had indeed appeared to be asylum seekers. Later on 8 January 2016, the North Rhine-Westphalian interior minister Ralf Jaeger gave Wolfgang Albers an early retirement, other sources say it was mayor Reker who pensioned Albers off.

=== Investigation on communal sexual harassment ===
On 10 January 2016, the Bundeskriminalamt (Federal Criminal Police) announced a nationwide investigation in Germany on communal sexual harassment, purportedly known as taharrush gamea in Arab countries.

=== Violence against foreigners ===
On Sunday, 10 January 2016, six Pakistanis were attacked in the city of Cologne by around 20 people. Two of them briefly needed treatment in a hospital. Five people that same night attacked one Syrian man in Cologne who also was injured. In addition, three Guinean men were attacked.
According to British newspaper The Daily Telegraph, "a group of thugs" in Cologne was planning a "manhunt" for migrants.

=== Updating the law on sexual violence ===
On 11 January 2016, columnist Jakob Augstein in Spiegel Online argued that the German laws concerning sex crimes were lagging behind, because under the current law, unconsensual sex in Germany was only a penal offence in case the unwilling participant had physically, noticeably defended himself or herself: simply saying "No" was not enough to find a defendant guilty. Around 12 January 22 self-declared German feminists in an open letter pleaded that the German law should make sexual harassment a criminal offence, and the issue was further debated in German society.

In July 2016, partly in reaction to the sex attacks in Cologne in the 2016 New Year's Eve, the Bundestag (German Parliament) with huge majority passed a new law, classifying groping as a sex crime, clarifying that "No means No" even if a victim does not fight back. This new law also makes it easier to deport a migrant after committing a sex offence.

=== Increased police surveillance ===
In reaction to the sexual assaults, by mid-January 2016 police presence had been increased in Große Freiheit in Hamburg.

Before the 2016 Carnival events took place, from 4 until 9 February, the police in Cologne had prepared a force of over 2,500 officers, more than three times the number of the previous year. On the first night of the Carnival, the police presence in Cologne was doubled in comparison to the previous year, with over 2,000 police officers.

On the first night of the Düsseldorf Carnival of 4 February 2016, the police presence was also doubled compared to the previous year.

=== Police raids on criminal refugees and North Africans ===
Between 17 and 23 January 2016, the police in North Rhine-Westphalia pursued five raids, purportedly to search for delinquents among immigrants. On Sunday, 17 January, nearly 300 police officers sealed off several streets in the vicinity of Düsseldorf Hauptbahnhof, to check out some 300 North Africans in the area. On 19 January, police showed up in refugee shelters in the small town of Ahlen. On 19 and 20 January, police cruised the Kalk district of Cologne where they arrested six people. On 22 January before dawn, dozens of policemen visited refugee shelters in Recklinghausen and woke all residents up. "Repeatedly" during these raids, police encountered either illegal residents or people who had committed crimes, as newpapaper Die Welt asserted.

=== Restraining orders ===
On 27 January 2016, the Cologne police placed restraining orders on some of the New Year's Eve suspects, for the area of Cologne's old town, cathedral, and central train station, during the Carnival celebrations lasting from 4 until 9 February.

=== Closing of a girls' high school ===
On 30 January 2016, a girls' Gymnasium, the archiepiscopal Ursulinenschule in Cologne, announced that the school would remain closed on the day of Weiberfastnacht (women's fasting night), on 4 February. The first night of the street carnival is part of a first day which traditionally comprises a reversal of the normal hierarchy between the sexes, in which the women rule over the town for one day. A school leader asserted to the Kölner Stadt-Anzeiger newspaper: "We want to spare our female pupils the road to school, on this day [...] For us, the security of the girls comes first". Other schools in Cologne, however, chose to discuss the New Year's Eve's events in the classroom, educating the pupils on alcohol use, date rape drugs, and pepper spray.

== Suspects and convictions ==
=== Investigations ===
==== Evaluating video recordings ====
As of early January 2016, the Cologne police evaluated 1,100 hours of video footage from surveillance cameras and from telephones of witnesses, but on 18 January, a policeman anonymously said to the press that several of the video recordings of the Cologne Cathedral plaza on New Year's Eve were unusable. In November 2016, the Ministry of Internal Affairs of North Rhine-Westphalia confirmed that because of those crime scenes in Cologne having been both dark and overcrowded, those video images had mostly proven to be of poor quality and therefore not very helpful for the investigations.

==== Hamburg ====
In Hamburg, on 20 January 2016 the police published photos of two suspects of sexual assaults on New Year's Eve, which led to the recognition of one of them — a 29-year-old male migrant from Afghanistan — the next day by a guard in a refugee center, and the suspect's arrest.

On 26 January, the Hamburg police published a photo taken with a surveillance camera of a 33-year-old Iranian man who was suspected to have groped two young women on New Year's Eve, which led to him being recognized by one victim and his subsequent arrest.

On 4 February, the Hamburg police released photos of two further suspects; the national TV series Aktenzeichen XY... ungelöst ("Case number XY ... unsolved") was also used for the tracing of Hamburg perpetrators.

==== Düsseldorf ====
In February 2016, an 18-year-old girl from Mönchengladbach, sexually harassed in Düsseldorf on New Year's Eve, recognized her harasser on television, which led to his arrest on around 14 February.

==== Cologne ====
On 8 March 2016, the Cologne police published the first five photos of suspects of sexual harassment on New Year's Eve, quickly leading to the arrest of two of them.

==== Checking previously suspected North Africans ====
Since 2014, the Düsseldorf police in the so-called "Casablanca" project had registered 2,200 suspects from North Africa who were supposedly criminally active, in Düsseldorf. The Düsseldorf police said on 6 January 2016 that they were now investigating whether any of those suspects were involved in the theft and sex crimes on Cologne New Year's Eve 2015–16.

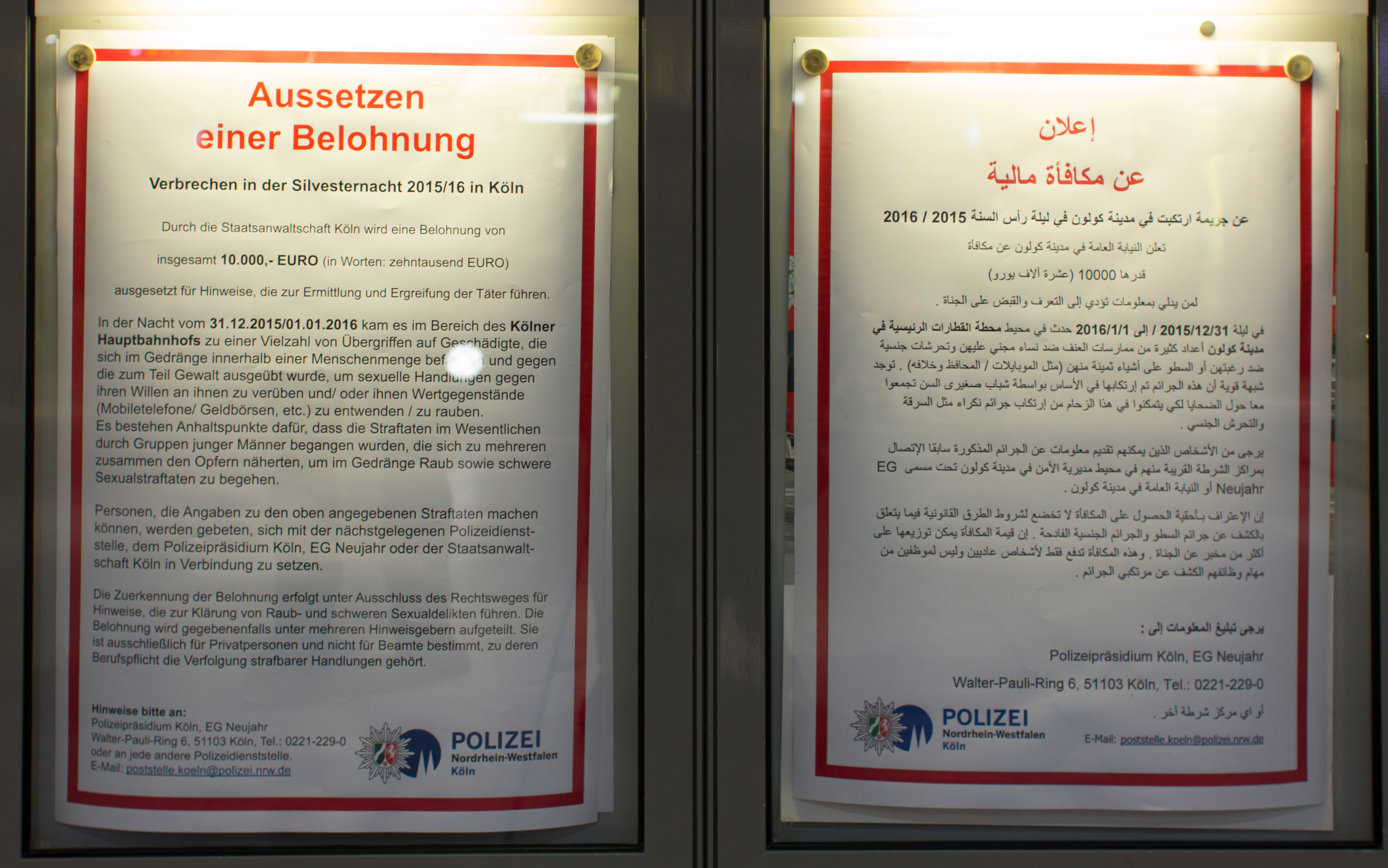
Poster showing the title "Offering a Reward" in both German and Arabic in Cologne

==== Cologne ====
On 15 January 2016, the state attorney of North Rhine-Westphalia offered 10,000 euro as a reward for informations that would lead to the tracing of perpetrators of the Cologne New Year's Eve sexual assaults, to be shared among all informants.

==== Hamburg ====
The Hamburg police on 4 February 2016 offered 2,000 euro for information leading to the tracing of perpetrators of the New Year's Eve sexual assaults in Hamburg.

=== Difficulty in proving guilt ===
The Hamburg professor of law Reinhard Merkel stated on 18 January 2016, "I don't suppose the perpetrators will be sentenced". This was because for a conviction, it is mandatory that the victim is fully sure of the identity of the offender, and that her statements on this point are credible enough. However, he added: "In many cases, when asked whether she is 100% sure of it, she will admit honestly, from fear of a false statement and under pressure of the defence, that she is not absolutely sure".

=== Suspects ===
On 7 January 2016, police reported sixteen suspects of mob sex attacks on the past New Year's Eve in Cologne, Hamburg, or other cities.

In July 2016, the Bundeskriminalamt (German Federal Criminal Police) stated that more than 2,000 men had participated in sexual offences on New Year's Eve in all of Germany, but doubted whether more than the 120 identified so far would ever be identified. In November 2016, newspaper Die Welt confirmed that most of the suspects of various offences on the past New Year's Eve in Germany had not been identified.

=== Identified suspects ===
On 8 January 2016, the German federal police knew the names of 31 suspects of various offences on New Year's Eve nationwide, most of them for inflicting physical harm or robbery; none of them were suspected of sexual offences.

In June 2016, the Bundeskriminalamt (German Federal Criminal Police) declared that 70% of the suspects of sexual offences in Germany on New Year's Eve had been in Germany for less than a year, but in July 2016 they said that only 50% of the identified suspects had been in Germany for less than a year. By July 2016, most of the 120 identified suspects of sexual violence in the New Year's Eve in Germany were originally from North Africa.

==== Cologne ====
On 8 January 2016, the Federal Ministry of the Interior stated that 31 suspects of various offences during New Year's Eve in Cologne had been identified by name. They included nine Algerians, eight Moroccans, four Syrians, five Iranians, two Germans, an Iraqi, a Serb, and an American. On 10 January 2016, the Cologne police were investigating 19 named suspects of various offences in Cologne on New Year's Eve: all of them were non-Germans, ten were asylum applicants, nine others presumably illegally in Germany, 14 of them were men from Morocco or Algeria.

On 11 January, the number of identified suspects of various crimes in Cologne on New Year's Eve was reported to be 23. By 20 January, the Cologne authorities had traced 30 suspects in relation to various offences on New Year's Eve, all North Africans, 25 of them having originated in Morocco or Algeria. On 21 January, Ralf Jäger, Minister of the Interior of North Rhine-Westphalia, stated that those 30 identified Cologne suspects were not members of a known pickpocketing gang. On 28 January, the police knew of 35 suspects of New Year's Eve crimes, among them three suspects for sexual crimes; most suspects came from Morocco, Algeria, or Tunisia.

Around 7 February 2016, a young woman identified from police photos eight presumed perpetrators of sexual offences in Cologne on New Year's Eve. By mid-February, 73 suspects of various criminal offences during Cologne's New Year's Eve had been identified. They included 30 Moroccans, 27 Algerians, 4 Iraqis, 3 Tunisians, 3 Syrians, 3 Germans, and one each from Libya, Iran, and Montenegro.

As of 6 April 2016, the Cologne police had traced 153 suspects in relation to various offences on New Year's Eve; 149 of them were foreigners, with 103 of this group from Morocco or Algeria, 68 asylum applicants, 18 others presumably illegally living in Germany. Four of these suspects were unaccompanied underaged refugees. In June 2016, the Bundeskriminalamt (German Federal Criminal Police) declared that the majority of the men harassing women on the Cathedral Plaza in Cologne in the New Year's Eve had been of North African or Arab origin, and that most offenders in Cologne had come to Germany as refugees in 2015. By November 2016, in 140 cases of alleged sexual offences in Cologne on New Year's Eve, at least one suspect had been identified.

==== Frankfurt ====
On 11 January 2016, the Frankfurt police had identified and arrested ten suspects of sexual attacks in the New Year's Eve 2015–16 in Frankfurt, all of them refugees.

==== Hamburg ====
On 14 January 2016, the Hamburg police had traced eight suspects who had committed various offences or sexual assaults on New Year's Eve in Hamburg; some of them were refugees, some lived in the city for years, while others had a migration background. One identified suspect of sexual assault in the New Year's Eve in Hamburg was arrested on 21 January and another on 5 February. The suspects were migrants from Afghanistan and Iran.

==== Stuttgart ====
On 17 January 2016, in Stuttgart, an asylum seeker from Iraq was identified and arrested as suspect of harassing two girls on New Year's Eve.

==== Dortmund ====
In Dortmund, on 18 January 2016, the police said that of the first nine identified suspects of various offences on New Year's Eve, seven were foreigners. By November 2016, at least five suspects strictly of sexual offences in Dortmund in the New Year's Eve had been identified and persecuted.

==== Düsseldorf ====
In Düsseldorf, by 20 January 2016, nine suspects of various offences on New Year's Eve had been identified; eight of them were originally from abroad. By November 2016, the officials had traced one or more suspects for 41 sexual offences on New Year's Eve in Düsseldorf.

==== Bielefeld ====
In Bielefeld, by 20 January 2016, four suspects of various offences on New Year's Eve had been traced, all from Morocco or Algeria. By November 2016, in 15 out of 20 judicial proceedings for various offences on New Year's Eve in Bielefeld, the accused had been traced.

=== Arrests, custody ===
==== Cologne ====
During New Year's Eve 2015–16 itself, between 22:00 and 5:00, near the central railway station, the Cologne police took 11 persons into custody and arrested another four, in relation to various offences. One Cologne policeman stated he had detained eight suspects for various offences that night, all asylum seekers.

On 8 January 2016, the Cologne police arrested and took into custody two men suspected of various offences on New Year's Eve, but they were set free within two days for lack of specific suspicions. On 10 January, four named suspects were currently under investigative custody for robbery offences on Cologne's New Year's Eve. On 12 January, five men accused of theft, but not sexual offences, on Cologne's New Year's Eve were in custody. On 14 January, five accused men were still in custody in Cologne. On 18 January, the first suspect of sexual offences in the Cologne New Year's Eve attacks was taken into investigative custody, an Algerian young man living in a refugee shelter 30 km away from Cologne.

On 21 January, eight suspects of various offences were under investigative custody in Cologne, on 29 January this number rose to ten, on 16 February to 15 suspects. On 18 February, after having been recognised in a police photo by a young woman, one presumed perpetrator of sexual offences in the Cologne New Year's Eve attacks was arrested. After publishing photos of five suspects of sexual harassment on 8 March 2016, the police of Cologne arrested two of them within one day. By 17 March, the Cologne police held 14 people in investigative custody, two of them for sexual offences on New Year's Eve.

By 6 April 2016, the Cologne police still held 24 suspects of various offences from New Year's Eve in investigative custody. In late April 2016, the Swiss police arrested another suspect of attacks on women on Cologne's New Year's Eve and extradited him to Germany.

==== Frankfurt ====
On 11 January 2016, the Frankfurt police said that the first ten arrested suspects of sexual attacks on New Year's Eve 2015–16 in Frankfurt were all refugees.

==== Stuttgart ====
On 17 January 2016, in Stuttgart, an asylum seeker from Iraq was arrested on suspicion of having taken part in a group harassment of two girls on New Year's Eve.

==== Hamburg ====
In Hamburg, in response to photos being published on 20 January 2016 of two suspects of sexual assaults on New Year's Eve, a 29-year-old male migrant from Afghanistan living in a refugee centre, was arrested the next day.

On 5 February, in response to a surveillance camera photo being published, a 33-year-old man from Iran was subsequently recognized by one of his victims and arrested in a refugee reception centre in Hamburg. He was taken into investigative custody under suspicion of assaulting two young women on New Year's Eve.

==== Düsseldorf ====
In February 2016, an 18-year-old girl from Mönchengladbach who was sexually harassed in Düsseldorf on New Year's Eve recognized her harasser on television, which led to his arrest around 14 February.

=== Criminal proceedings ===
In July 2016, the Bundeskriminalamt (Federal Criminal Police) noted that nationwide, judicial proceedings against 120 suspects of sexual violence from the last New Year's Eve in Germany had been instituted.

==== Cologne ====
On 8 January 2016, the Cologne police were investigating against 19 suspects of various offences in Cologne on New Year's Eve. On 10 January, the Cologne police was investigating 19 named suspects of various offences in Cologne on New Year's Eve, all of them were non-Germans, ten were asylum applicants, with nine others presumably illegally in Germany, 14 of them were men from Morocco or Algeria.

On 12 January, the Staatsanwaltschaft (state attorney) was investigating 12 men accused of theft, but not sexual offences, in Cologne. On 14 January, an investigation ran in Cologne against 13 accused of various offences; on 21 January this number rose to 30. All the accused were North Africans; on 29 January this number rose to 44, with most of them again being North Africans. On 16 February 2016, an investigation ran in Cologne against 73 suspects of theft, sexual assault, or other offences on New Year's Eve, 60 of them of North African descent.

On 17 March, the Staatsanwaltschaft (state attorney) in Cologne was investigating 120 accused, but at the most two of them were accused of sexual offences. On 25 November 2016, criminal investigations in Cologne were started against 83 suspects of various offences on New Year's Eve.

==== Frankfurt ====
In late January 2016, police in Frankfurt were investigating ten men suspected of pickpocketing, but not directly sexual violence, on New Year's Eve near the Eiserner Steg footbridge in the city centre. The accused were all either asylum seekers or refugees.

Eventually, all criminal proceedings in Frankfurt concerning sexual violence on New Year's Eve had to be dismissed due to lack of sufficient substantiated suspicion against specific persons, as declared in September 2016 by a spokesman of the Staatsanwaltschaft (state attorney).

==== Düsseldorf ====
By November 2016, in three cases of sexual offences on New Year's Eve in Düsseldorf criminal proceedings had started.

==== Bielefeld ====
By November 2016, 15 criminal proceedings had started in Bielefeld for various offences on New Year's Eve.

==== Dortmund ====
By November 2016, five judicial proceedings had started in Dortmund for sexual offences on New Year's Eve.

=== Convictions, sentences ===
As of July 2016, four men had been convicted for sexual violence on New Year's Eve nationwide in Germany.

==== Cologne ====
In July 2016, the first two men were convicted in Cologne for sexual assault on New Year's Eve: a 21-year-old Iraqi and a 26-year-old Algerian. They were given suspended one-year sentences. On 25 November 2016, six suspects accused of various offences on Cologne's New Year's Eve were found guilty. The longest sentence was 1 year and nine months, but it was not yet legally valid since the convict appealed against his sentence. The proceedings against 52 suspects were stopped.

==== Düsseldorf ====
By 25 November 2016, in one case for sexual offences on New Year's Eve in Düsseldorf, the accused had been sentenced to 1 year and ten months imprisonment; his appeal against that sentence was still ongoing.

==== Dortmund ====
By 25 November 2016, two accused of sexual offences on New Year's Eve in Dortmund had been convicted. One was sentenced to 25 hours of community service for insults on a sexual basis, the other was fined 1,000 euros for exhibitionism.

== Later comparable incidents in Germany ==
=== Carnival 2016 ===
The 2016 Carnival celebrations were from Thursday, 4 February, until Tuesday, 9 February. After the first night, 22 sexual offences including two rapes were reported to the Cologne police, whereas the two previous years saw 10 and 9 reports of sexual offences after the first night. The Cologne police director commented that "the readiness to report [such assaults] clearly has changed". Of one of the rapes in Cologne, a 17-year-old asylum seeker from Nigeria living in a residence for refugees was suspected, and he was arrested.

One rape was reported in Schloß Holte-Stukenbrock that first night, attributed to a 29-year-old asylum seeker from Nigeria, and four sexual assaults were reported in Bonn. By the end of the Carnival, a total of 66 complaints of sexual offences had been reported to the police in Cologne. A female reporter covering the Cologne Carnival for Belgian television was groped live on camera by attackers of native European origin.

=== Other ===
- At the Karneval der Kulturen (Carnival of Cultures) festival in Kreuzberg, Berlin in May 2016, a four-day music and theatre festival with one million visitors, eight sexual assaults were reported. Four men were arrested: a 40-year-old man from Turkey and three boys ranging between 14 and 17 years old, born in Berlin with a Turkish or Lebanese background.
- At the Schlossgrabenfest in Darmstadt in May 2016, a four-day music festival with 400,000 visitors, three alleged sexual assaults led to 18 reports to the police. Young women reportedly were encircled and touched indecently by groups of men. Three suspects, asylum seekers aged between 28 and 31, were arrested.
- In Wolfhagen, near Kassel, during a village feast in 2016, the police recorded four sexual assaults by refugees who were lodged nearby. All suspects were arrested.
- In the German city of Freiburg in July 2016, a young male African asylum seeker attempted to rape a 27-year-old woman in the ladies’ room of a discothèque; he was arrested.
- In Freiburg in October 2016, two women aged 21 and 29 were sexually harassed by 17 young migrants in a park. Three suspected migrants from Gambia aged 18 to 20 were arrested.
- In the Leipzig cultural centre of Conne Island in 2016, several of the refugees in the audience were observed staring intently at women or groping their bottoms, purportedly not understanding this was prohibited. To counter this problem, the management of the club abolished the substantially reduced entrance fees for refugees, except for those who registered themselves with an e-mail address.

== Alleged sex assaults elsewhere ==
=== We Are Sthlm 2014, 2015 ===
At the Stockholm annual music festival for youths between 13 and 19, 'We Are Sthlm', in both 2014 and 2015 the police received reports of sexual harassment from around 15–20 women or girls, often younger than 15 years of age. The police did not publicise those reports, but Sveriges Radio reported about them shortly after the August 2015 festival.

=== Finland 2015 ===
According to one Helsinki police chief, after the arrival of 32,000 asylum seekers in Finland in 2015, many from Iraq, 14 sexual attacks on streets or in parks in the capital Helsinki occurred up until the following New Year's Eve. According to the Helsinki police chief, such incidents never previously occurred in Finland.

=== New Year's Eve 2015–16 ===
==== Finland ====
On Helsinki's Senate Square (Finland), where 20,000 people had gathered for New Year's Eve 2015–16 celebrations, women had complained to "security personnel" about asylum seekers groping their breasts and unwelcomely kissing them, as the police reported. Three Iraqi asylum seekers were arrested for sexual assaults at the square. In two more sexual assaults, the suspects were also asylum seekers who were taken into custody on the spot, said police.

At Helsinki's central railway station, where a crowd of 1,000 mostly Iraqi refugees had converged on New Year's Eve, three sexual assaults were reported to the police.

==== Sweden ====
In the Swedish city of Kalmar, 15 young women reported to the police that they were groped by groups of men on New Year's Eve 2015–16; 11 reports of sexual assault were made. Groups of men reportedly encircled women on a crowded square and groped them. The first two identified suspects in Kalmar were asylum seekers.

==== Switzerland ====
In Zürich, Switzerland, six women reported to the police being surrounded by "dark-skinned men" on New Year's Eve 2015–16 who robbed, groped, and molested them.

==== Austria ====
In Austria, several sex attacks on New Year's Eve 2015–16 were alleged in local news media. One alleged victim of a sex attack in Salzburg related to an Austrian newspaper that while walking with her friends in the historic centre of Salzburg, they were attacked by a group of 10–15 men. One man grabbed one of the girls, put her head into headlock in his jacket, cuddled her, and licked her face. She had to hit and kick the man to free herself.

== See also ==
- Crime in Germany
- Immigration and crime in Germany
