= Wolfgang Albers (police president) =

German jurist (born 1955)

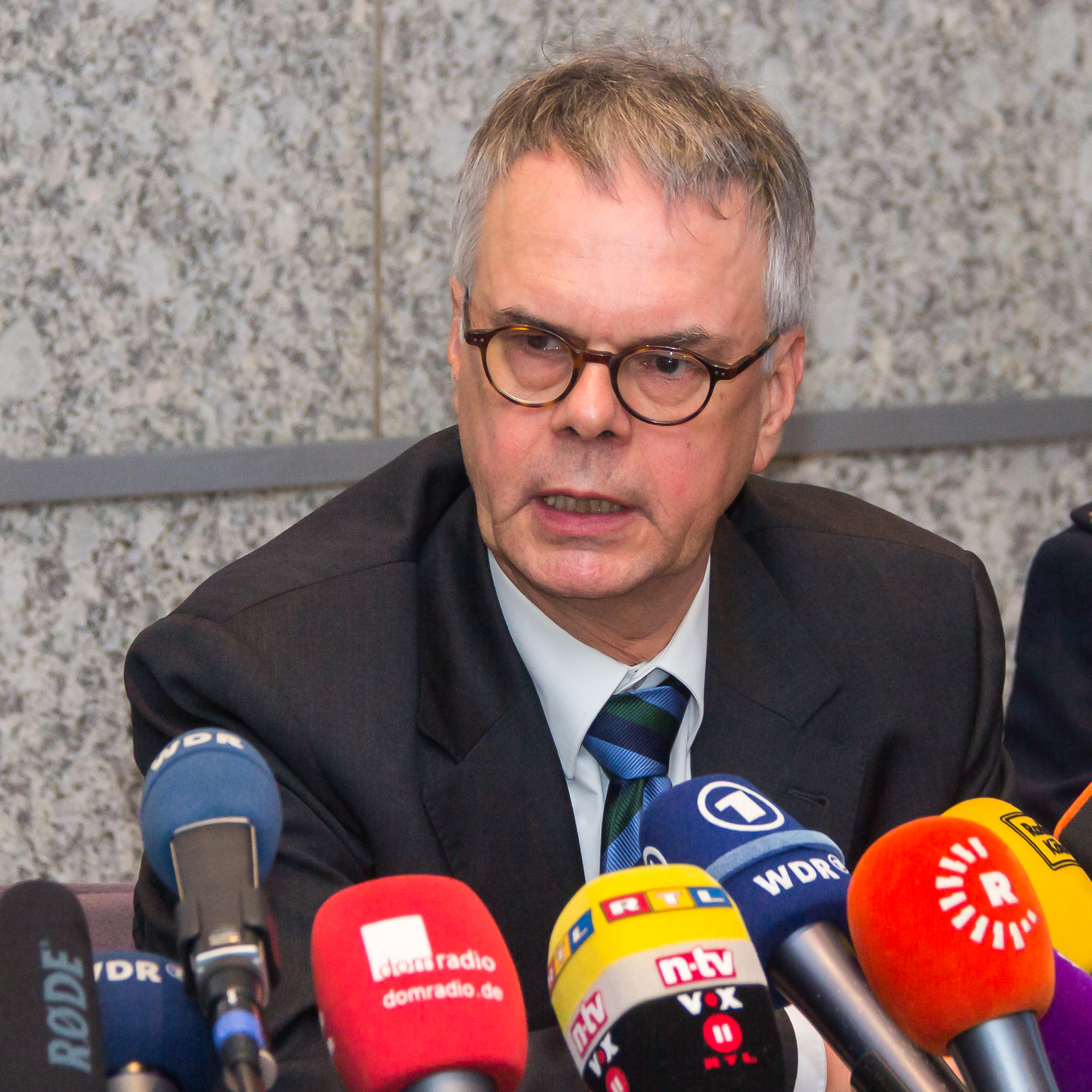
Wolfgang Albers at the press conference on 5 January 2016 on the New Year's Eve sexual assaults

Wolfgang Albers (born 1955) is a German jurist. From 1 October 2011 to 8 January 2016 he has served as chief of the Cologne police (German: Polizeipräsident).

== Background ==
Albers studied law at the University of Bonn, and following his Staatsexamen degree he joined the state administration service at the Cologne district administration. He joined the SPD and was among the organizational committee of the peace movement protests in Germany, including the 1982 Hofgarten demonstration in Bonn against the NATO Double-Track Decision with several hundred thousands of peaceful protesters.

== Career ==
One of his first professional functions was to serve as provisional acting head of Leverkusen Police for two years. In 1991 he transferred to the state government of the German federal state of North Rhine-Westphalia to work in the Minister of Interior's personal staff. In 2002, Interior Minister Fritz Behrens appointed him to head the police department of Bonn. He reduced staff and closed as well the Mounted police department. The German police union GdP was highly critical of the policy.

In 2011, he succeeded the retiring chief of the police department of Cologne, Klaus Steffenhagen, upon appointment of Interior Minister Ralf Jäger. Albers was criticized in October 2014, when the Cologne police did not bring violent anti-Islamist Hogesa protests under control. Critics referred to a similar demonstration in Hannover, which had been pacified by a strict interdiction of alcoholic beverages, various weapons and entry checks and a much larger police force. In comparison, the Cologne police forces had been surprised by the violent approach and the large number of protestors. A scandal around hazing rituals in special police force, Spezialeinsatzkommando 3“ (SEK) in Cologne lead to first calls for a retreat of Albers by members of the local CDU. Albers had not reacted on media reports first, but had quickly dissolved the unit after a public controversy. Finally, a court investigation showed no need for further investigation and closed the case. Albers lost trust within the police force according to a report of moderate conservative daily FAZ.

In January 2016, following the inadequate handling of the sexual assaults on New Year's Eve, the Cologne police came under criticism again and Albers faced demands to resign. Because of the allegations of misinformation and the "loss of public trust", the Minister of the Interior transferred Albers to provisional retirement on January 8.

== Personal aspects ==
Albers lives in Cologne, he is married and has a daughter. He is member of the Kirchenkreis Bonn of the Evangelical Church in the Rhineland and was appointed member of the local Synode.

Albers often carried hats in public. The local daily Kölner Stadtanzeiger used that for an article about Albers collection of hats and his role as a Hutbürger (hat citizen), a pun with Wutbürger, a famous German 2010 neologism about enraged citizens.

He often used a bicycle, even for professional occasions and is among the proponents of compulsory bicycle helmets.
