= Nafri =

German police term for a North African youth

Nafri is a term that has been used internally by the German police since 2013 to refer to young men of a North African origin. It is an abbreviation of "Nordafrikanischer Intensivtäter" ("North African serial offender").

The term received media attention in 2017 when police in Cologne, who tried to avoid a repeat of the mass sexual assaults in the city, were accused of racial profiling and degrading North Africans by referring to them as Nafris.
