= Mass sexual assault =

Collective sexual assault in public

Mass sexual assault is the collective sexual assault of adults and sometimes children, in public by groups. Typically acting under the protective cover of large gatherings, victims have reported being groped, stripped, beaten, bitten, penetrated and raped.

== Egypt ==
In Egypt, several mass sexual assaults have received wide international coverage. In Arabic, the term "mass sexual assaults" translates as تحرش جماعي (taḥarrush jamāʿī), often incorrectly transliterated in the media as "taharrush gamea" following a German police report into the 2015/2016 New Year's Eve sexual assaults in Germany.

== Germany ==
During New Year's Eve celebrations 2015/2016, incidents of mass sexual assault and numerous thefts occurred in Germany, mainly in Cologne city center and numerous other cities. Over 1,200 women were reportedly sexually assaulted, in large part by men of Muslim origin.

== India ==
Several cases of mass sexual assault have been reported in India and have received significant international coverage. During the 2002 riots in Gujarat, targeted violence against Muslim women and children documented by civil society groups reported "mass rapes, live burials and burnings, acid attacks, impaling, and other brutal forms of torture that was deeply gendered, and linked violence against women with violence on their children – both born and unborn". Survivors reported "that sexual violence consisted of forced nudity, mass rapes, gang-rapes, mutilation, insertion of objects into bodies, cutting of breasts, slitting the stomach and reproductive organs, and carving of Hindu religious symbols on women's body parts. The Concerned Citizens' Tribunal, characterised the use of rape "as an instrument for the subjugation and humiliation of a community".

In July 2012, a teenage girl was sexually assaulted for up to 45 minutes by a large group of men outside a bar in Guwahati, Assam. No one intervened until the police arrived.

In January 2018, an 8-year-old girl, Asifa Bano, was gang raped by six men and a juvenile in the Rasana village near Kathua in Indian-administered Kashmir. The forensic evidence revealed that Bano had been raped multiple times by different men, and that she had been strangled to death, as well as being hit in the head with a heavy stone The main culprit was Sanji Ram, a priest of the local temple where the incident took place.

In July 2023, a video emerged of two Christian women in the Manipur state of India being forced to strip down naked and paraded through the streets by a large mob of men. The women were also sexually assaulted and slapped by the mob. The incident is said to have taken place in May of the same year however police only took action once the video went viral.

== Italy ==
On 2 June 2022, at least 6 underage girls were molested on a local train between Peschiera del Garda and Milan by young men who had attended an illegal rave party hours prior. Authorities later identified about 30 suspects.

During the 2022 New Year's celebration in the central Duomo square in Milan, at least 9 women were allegedly molested in separate mass sexual assault incidents. A 19-year-old woman was reportedly assaulted by about 30 men who repeatedly molested and groped her and attempted to strip her of her clothes until the police managed to intervene. The victim was then brought to a nearby hospital. Two young German tourists reported being assaulted and groped for at least ten minutes by about two dozen men. The girls complained about the indifference of the police, who reportedly failed to aid them even after hearing their cries for help. The two denounced the fact once they got back to their home city of Mannheim. On January 11 at least 18 suspects, all youngsters, were identified and searched by Italian authorities, who were aided in their investigation by facial recognition software.

At the 2025 New Year's celebration in the central Duomo square in Milan, several girls were molested by a crowd of 50 to 100 people. When they succeeded in reaching the police, they didn't receive any help.

== Sweden ==
Female participants at We Are Sthlm, a summer music festival for teenagers in Stockholm, reported in 2014 and 2015 that they had been surrounded and molested by groups of males, mostly teenage boys. Police were accused of having failed to publicize the attacks because the suspects were mostly from Afghanistan. The incidents came to light only after the 2016 New Year's Eve attacks in Germany when the Stockholm Police were accused of covering up the incidents, which they denied.

== United States ==
In July 1999, Woodstock 1999 took place and police subsequently investigated four complaints of sexual assault and rape, including digital rape, that allegedly occurred. At least one eyewitness, who was working as a volunteer at the event, reported to The Washington Post that he had seen a woman who was crowd surfing pulled down into the mosh pit and raped by five men.

On 11 June 2000 at least 44 women reported being sexually assaulted and robbed by a group of 60 men during the Puerto Rican Day Parade in New York. The police were heavily criticized for their handling of the attacks.

In February 2001, witnesses saw groups of men grope women, tearing off their clothes and apparently digitally penetrating them during the Mardi Gras celebrations in Seattle, Washington.

== See also ==
- Bystander effect
- Nanjing Massacre
- War rape
- Crime prevention

== Bibliography ==
- Rape Narratives in Motion. Germany, Springer International Publishing, 2019. Editors: Gabriella Nilsson, Lena Karlsson, Monika Edgren, Ulrika Andersson
