= Deutsche Polizeigewerkschaft =

German trade union

DPolG
- German Police Trade Union
- Deutsche Polizeigewerkschaft
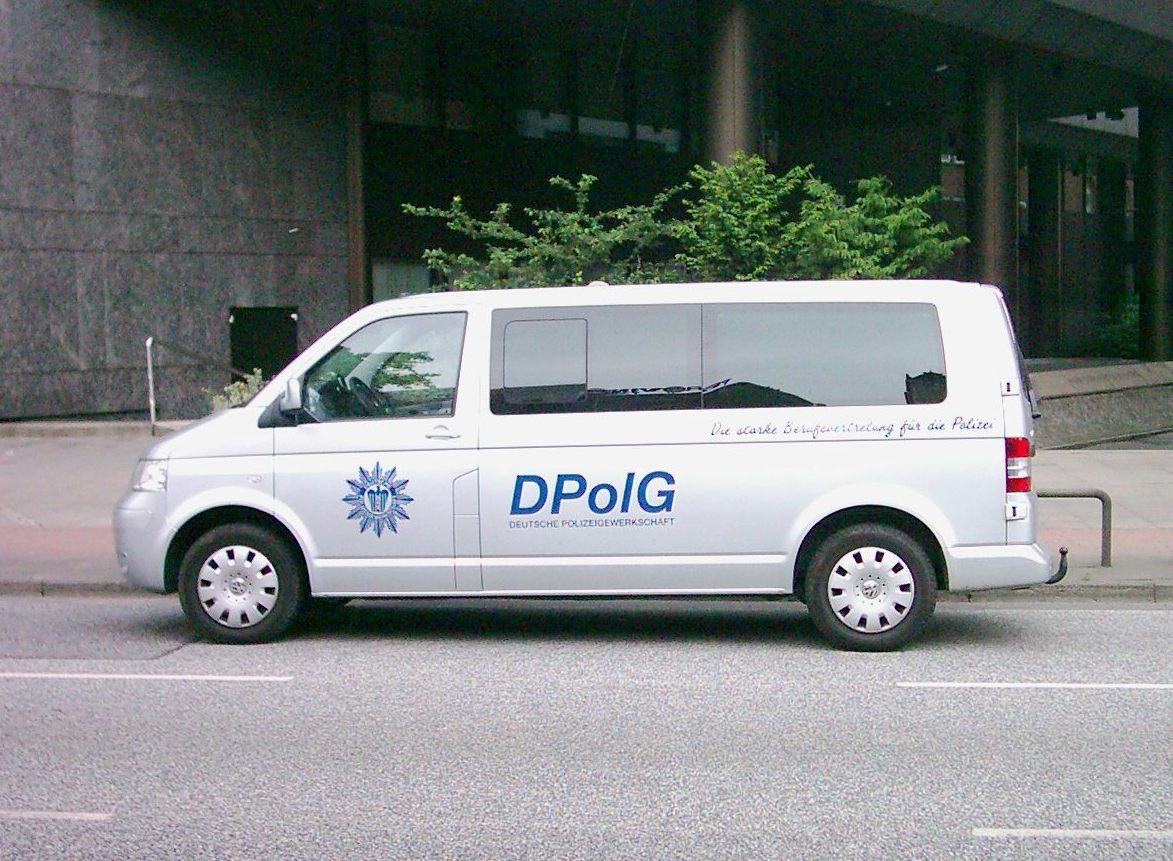
- Van of the DPolG
- Founded: 18 August 1951
- Headquarters: Berlin, Germany
- Location: Germany
- Members: 94,000
- Key people: Rainer Wendt, president
- Affiliations: German Civil Service Federation
- Website: www.dpolg.de

The German Police Trade Union (German: Deutsche Polizeigewerkschaft, DPolG) is a trade union in Germany. Representing 94,000 police employees, it is the second largest union for police employees in Germany, following the Gewerkschaft der Polizei (GdP). It is affiliated with the German Civil Service Federation (Deutscher Beamtenbund, DBB).

Since 2007, the union has been headed by Rainer Wendt, who was reelected in 2011, and – receiving more than 98% of member votes – in 2015.

== Presidents ==
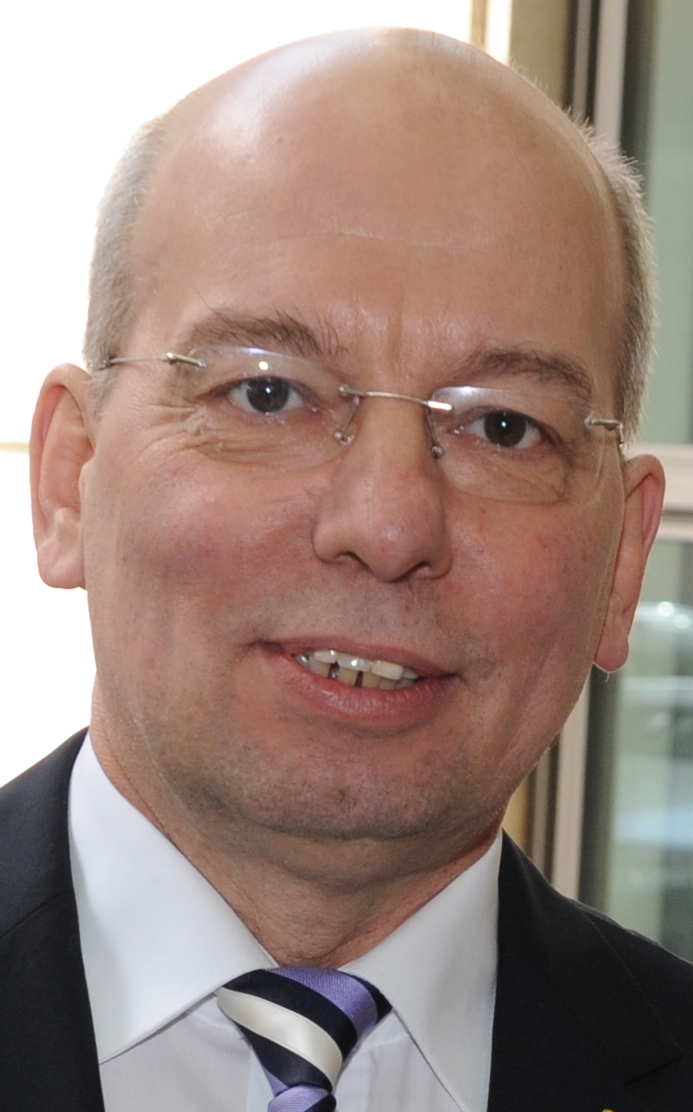
Rainer Wendt

- 1951–1962: Kurt Fähnrich
- 1962–1968: Walter Seidel
- 1968–1971: Jürgen Brockmann
- 1971–1975: Johannes Zistel
- 1975–1991: Benedikt-Martin Gregg
- 1991–1995: Harald Thiemann
- 1995–2003: Gerhard Vogler
- 2003–2007: Wolfgang Speck
- since 2007: Rainer Wendt
