= Ruhr Nachrichten =

German newspaper

- Type: Daily newspaper
- Format: Rheinisch
- Publisher: Medienhaus Lensing
- Founded: 1949; 76 years ago
- Headquarters: Dortmund
- Website: www.ruhrnachrichten.de

Ruhr Nachrichten is a daily newspaper that has been published in Dortmund, Germany since 1949. The paper is published by Medienhaus Lensing in Rheinisch format.

In 2001 Ruhr Nachrichten had a circulation of 225,000 copies.
