= Express (Cologne newspaper) =

German newspaper

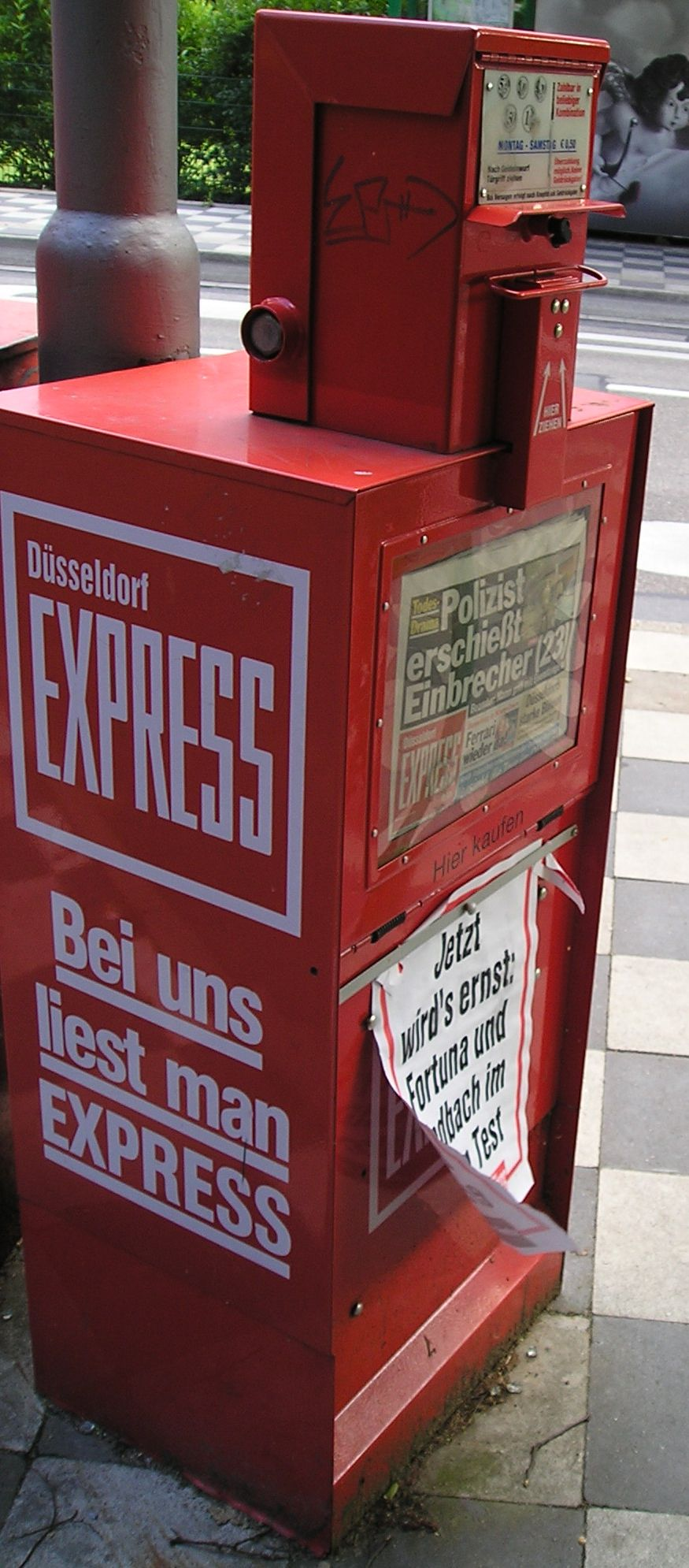
- Express newspaper machine in Düsseldorf
- Type: Tabloid journalism
- Publisher: DuMont Mediengruppe
- Editor-in-chief: Christian Spolders
- Founded: 2 March 1964; 61 years ago
- Language: German
- City: Cologne
- Country: Germany
- Website: express.de

Express (stylised in all-caps) is a German regional tabloid based in Cologne. It is published daily by DuMont Mediengruppe. The newspaper has local sections for Cologne, Düsseldorf and Bonn. It is also available in the surrounding region (Aachen, Mönchengladbach, Duisburg) without local section. The first edition of Express was published on 2 March 1964.

The newspaper had a circulation of 132,836 in the fourth quarter of 2015. Together with Kölner Stadt-Anzeiger, the newspaper has a staff of around 250 editors. Editor-in-chief is Christian Spolders.
