= Rainer Wendt =

German police officer

Rainer Wendt (born 29 November 1956 in Duisburg) is a German former policeman (Schutzpolizei). Since 2007 he is the Federal Chairman of the German Police Union (DPolG). The DPolG is one of the two German police unions. Left-of-center daily tagezeitung characterized Wendt as an effective populist notorious for law and order catchphrases.

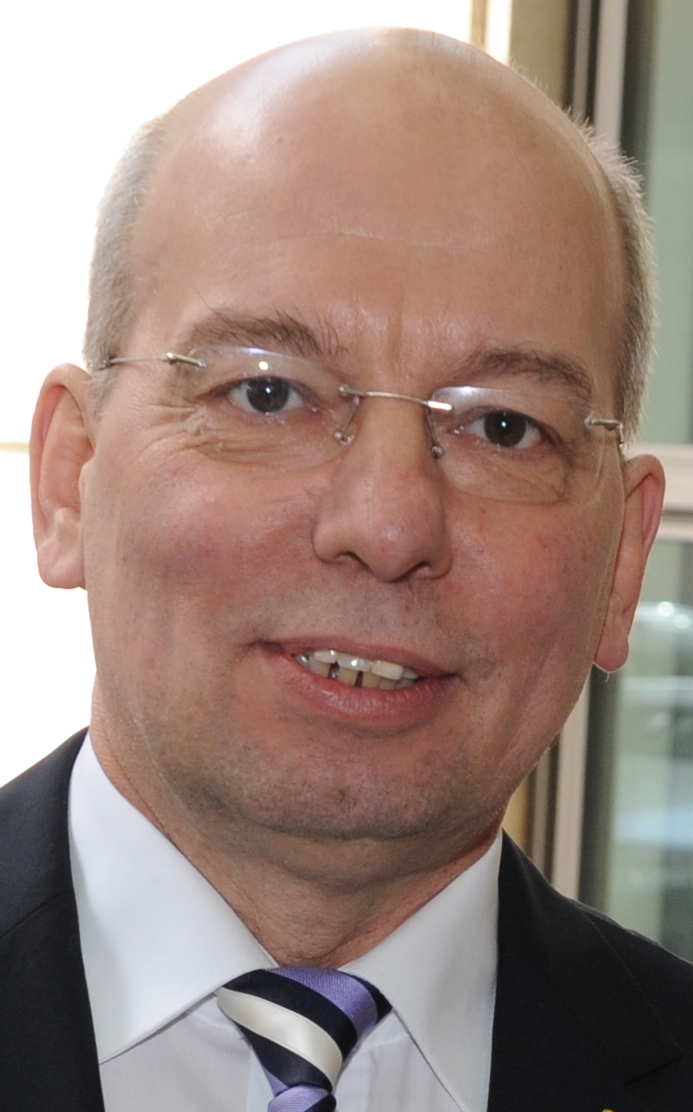
Rainer Wendt

In the first 48 hours following the 2015 Paris terror attacks, Wendt gave 22 interviews.

In 2016 he published a book titled Deutschland in Gefahr ("Germany in danger"). In 2017 a TV report uncovered how Wendt had been violating the law by accepting two simultaneous salaries, and not declaring additional jobs.

In the wake of the Amberg incident of December 2018 where four drunk asylum seekers had randomly beaten up passers-by, Wendt asked the Federal government to "take a stand" on that case.

In 2019, Saxony-Anhalt's Minister of the Interior wanted to appoint Wendt as state secretary but withdrew the nomination after a public outcry.
