= Eiserner Steg =

Footbridge over the Main in Frankfurt

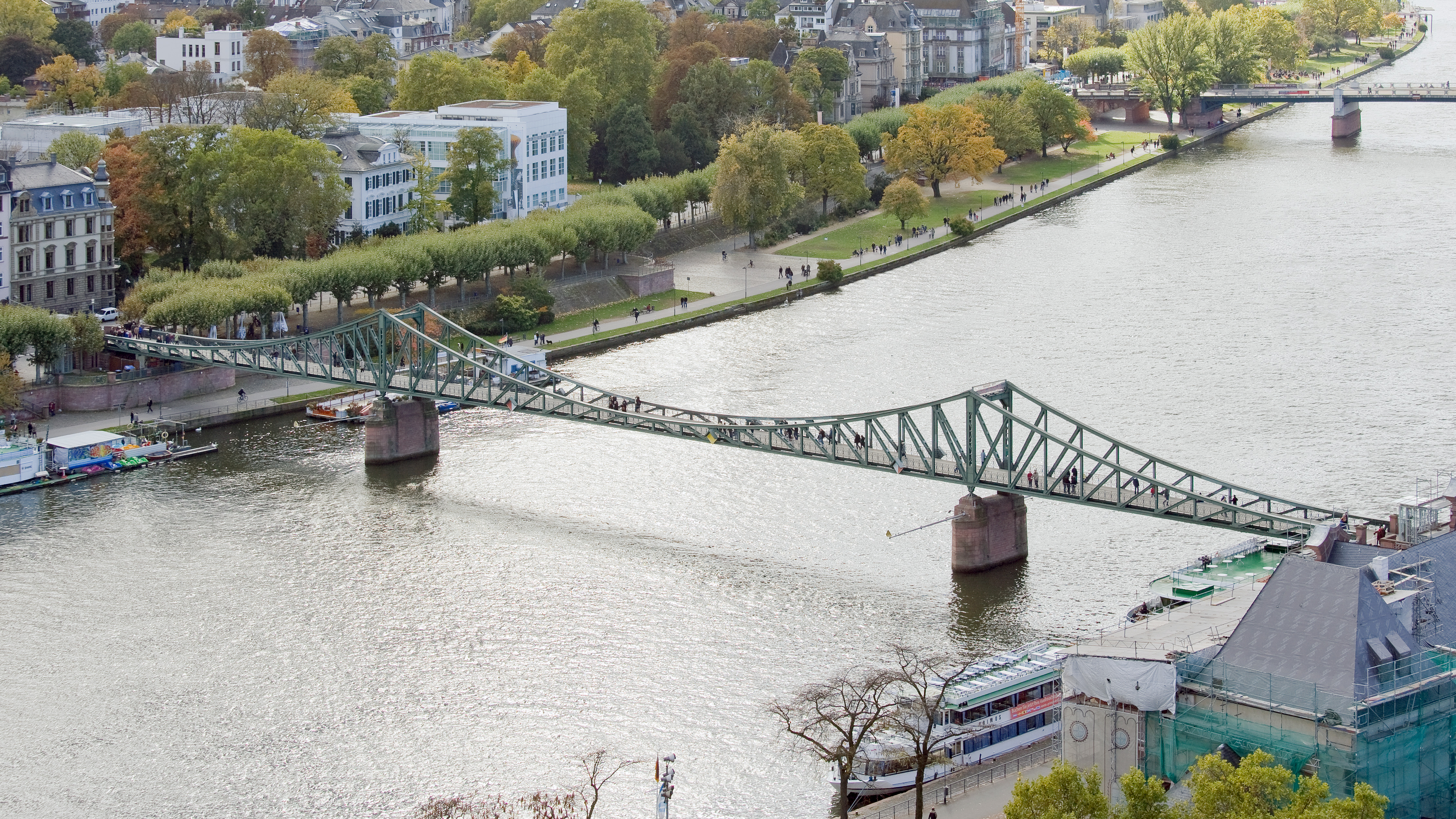
- Aerial view of the Eiserner Steg in 2010
- Coordinates: 50°06′29″N 8°40′56″E
- Carried: pedestrians
- Crossed: Main (river)
- Locale: Frankfurt Altstadt, Sachsenhausen (river kilometer 35.26)

Characteristics
- Design: Footbridge
- Material: Iron
- Total length: 173.59 m (569.5 ft)
- Width: 5.44 m (17.8 ft)

History
- Construction start: 1868
- Construction end: 1869
- Inaugurated: 29 September 1869; 156 years ago
- Rebuilt: 1946
- Destroyed: 25 March 1945; 80 years ago

Location
- Interactive map of Eiserner Steg

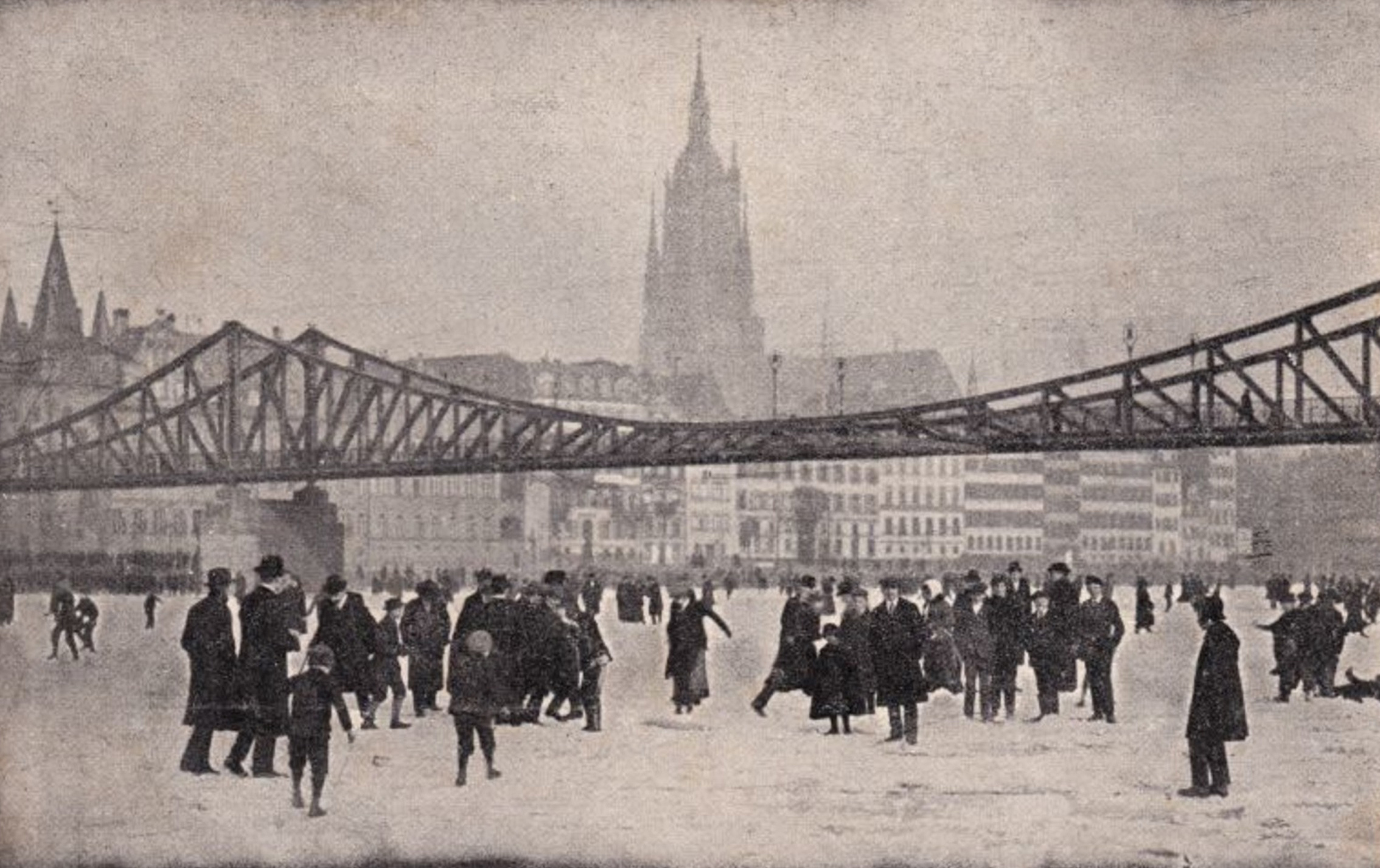
Two years after the renovation in January 1914

The Eiserner Steg (Iron Footbridge) is a footbridge spanning the river Main in the city of Frankfurt, Germany, which connects the centre of Frankfurt with the district of Sachsenhausen.

The first wrought iron bridge was built in 1868. It was replaced in 1911/1912 by a slightly larger cantilever bridge. It is 170 metres long and consists of riveted steel trusses with two bridge piers. The bridge was blown up by the Wehrmacht in the final days of World War II, but it was rebuilt shortly afterwards in 1946. It was fully renovated in 1993.

== Bibliography ==
- Setzepfandt, Wolf-Christian (2002). Architekturführer Frankfurt am Main / Frankfurt am Main : architectural guide / by Wolf-Christian Setzepfandt (in German). Berlin: Reimer. p. 27. ISBN 3-496-01236-6. OCLC 50645225.

== See also ==
- Alte Brücke (Frankfurt)
