= Gewerkschaft der Polizei =

German trade union

GdP
- Trade Union of the Police
- Gewerkschaft der Polizei
- Founded: 14 September 1950
- Headquarters: Berlin, Germany
- Location: Germany
- Members: 181,000
- Key people: Oliver Malchow
- Affiliations: DGB
- Website: www.gdp.de

The Gewerkschaft der Polizei (GdP; English: Trade Union of the Police) is a trade union in Germany. It represents 181,000 police employees, and is one of eight industrial affiliations of the German Confederation of Trade Unions (DGB). The GdP is one of the three trade unions for police employees in Germany, the other two being the Deutsche Polizeigewerkschaft - affiliated with the German Civil Service Federation - and the Bund Deutscher Kriminalbeamter, which is exclusively for members of the Kriminalpolizei.

The Trade Union of the Police was founded on a federal level on 14 September 1950 in Hamburg. It emerged from the Interessengemeinschaft der Polizeibeamtenbunde (Pool of Police Officer Federations), which had existed in the British occupation zone and West Berlin to that point. It joined the German Confederation of Trade Unions on 1 April 1978. On a European level, the GdP was part of the European Confederation of Police (EuroCOP). The GdP resigned its EuroCOP Membership in 2016, after some differences about the GdP Leadership Personnel.

The GdP is open to all employees of the police - including police officers, customs agents of the Bundeszollverwaltung (although Ver.di has a higher level of organisation in this group), administration workers, etc. It represents the job-related, social, economic, ecological, and cultural concerns of employees and former employees of the police. It especially seeks an improvement of their work and living conditions and of civil service and labor law. To achieve this, the organization takes part in social and political discussions.

== Presidents ==
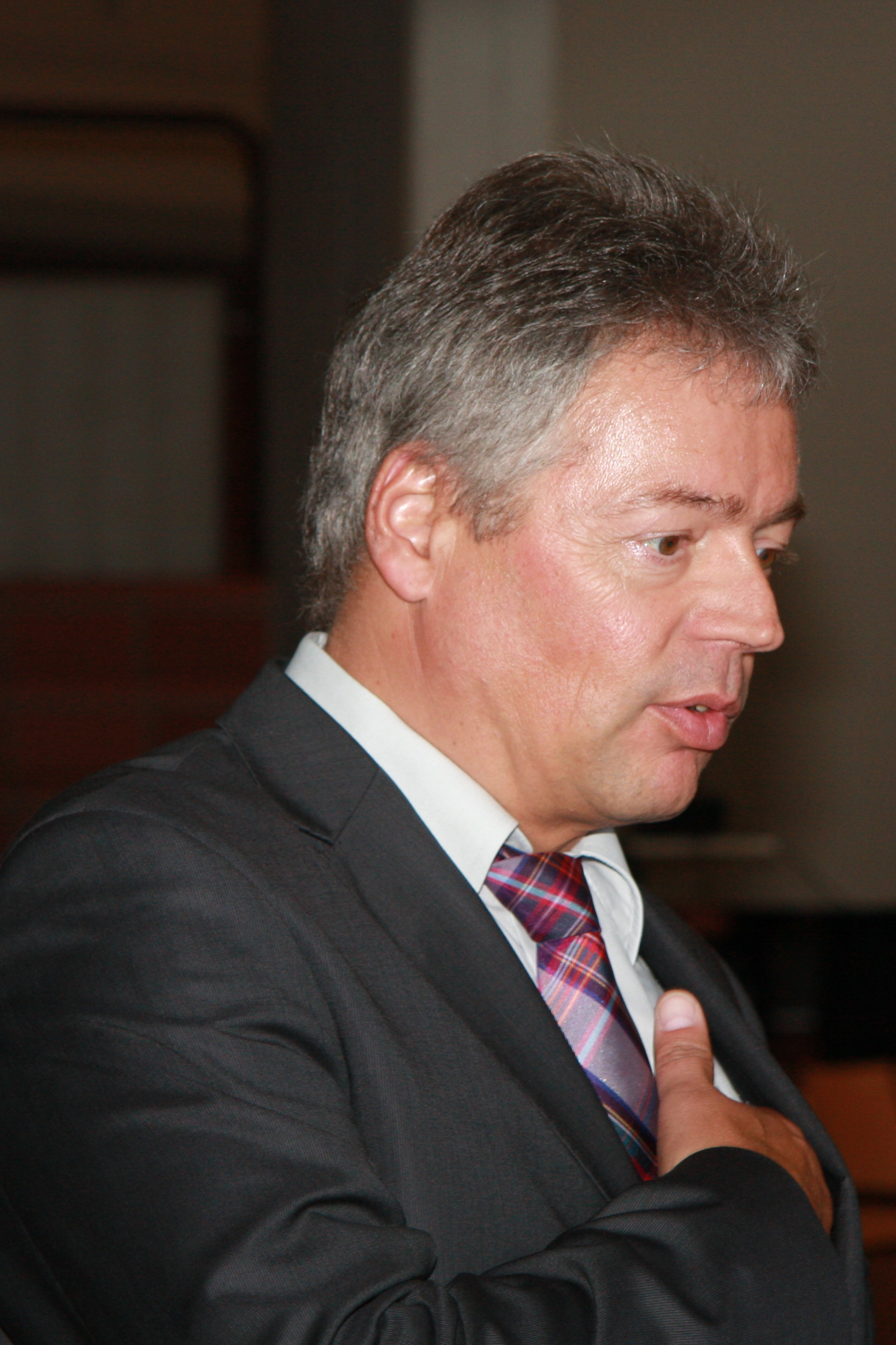
Bernhard Witthaut, 2011

- Fritz Schulte (1950–55)
- Fritz Preuß (1955–56)
- Fritz Kehler (1956–58)
- Werner Kuhlmann (1958–75)
- Helmut Schirrmacher (1975–81)
- Günter Schröder (1981–86)
- Hermann Lutz (1981–86)
- Norbert Spinrath (1998–2000)
- Konrad Freiberg (2000–10)
- Bernhard Witthaut (2010–13)
- Oliver Malchow (as of 2013)
