= Alice Neven DuMont =

German women's rights activist and politician

Johanna Josefine Maria Alice Neven DuMont (née Minderop, born April 19, 1877, in Cologne; died August 23, 1964, ibid.) was a German women's rights activist and local and social politician. She was a co-founder of the Stadtverband Kölner Frauenvereine and a promoter of numerous social and cultural projects in Cologne. From 1919 to 1933, she was second chairwoman of the Stadtverband Kölner Frauenvereine. From 1930 to 1931 she represented the German People's Party in the Prussian provincial parliament.

After the Second World War she was one of the new founders of the Cologne GEDOK in 1953.

== Life and work ==
Alice Minderop was born on April 19, 1877, the only daughter of Emilie Roeder (1856-1941) and Heinrich Minderop (1842-1923). She married the Cologne newspaper publisher Alfred Neven DuMont. During the First World War, she was active in the National Women's Association.

She was one of the co-founders of the Stadtverband Kölner Frauenvereine. In 1919, she took over the second chairmanship of the Stadtverband. From 1925, she organized the public relations work of the city association: the association newspaper appeared from November 1925 to May 1933 as a supplement to the Kölner Stadt-Anzeiger, which was published by her husband. In 1926 and 1927 she took over the chairmanship of the Rhenish-Westphalian Women's Association, the supra-regional federation of city associations.

She became chairman of the Gemeinschaft Deutscher und Oesterreichischer Künstlerinnenvereine aller Kunstgattungen (GEDOK), founded in 1929.

In 1930/31 she was elected to the Prussian Provincial Parliament as a deputy for the national-liberal German People's Party.

== Nazi era ==
After Adolf Hitler became Chancellor of Germany in 1933, Nazi anti-Jewish persecution forced women artists and politicians, including Else Falk and Hertha Kraus, to resign from their long-standing chairmanships of Cologne associations. Neven DuMont took over the chairmanship of the City Federation of Cologne Women's Associations from Else Falk on March 22, 1933. The umbrella organisation of the Stadtverband dissolved itself with all its affiliated local associations on May 22, 1933. As a result of the meeting of all Cologne women's associations on July 8, 1933, chaired by Martha von Gelinck, Neven DuMont applied on July 18, 1933, for the Müttererholungsverein, which she also chaired, to be incorporated into the Nazi women's association. Else Falk and Margarete Tietz were forced to resign from the chairmanship of the Cologne GEDOK because of their Jewish heritage and Alice Neven DuMont became chairman again.

In April 1934 Neven DuMont was asked by Martha von Gelinck to resign from the chairmanship of the Cologne GEDOK. She was elected again for one year in 1939 and succeeded by Irma Brandes in 1940.

To escape Allied bombing raids on Cologne, Neven DuMont spent the last months of the war in Starnberg with her son Kurt, who had married Franz von Lenbach's daughter Gabriele.

== Postwar ==
After World War II, Neven DuMont ran Das Lädchen, the women's association's sales outlet founded in 1922 by Rosa Bodenheimer and Adele Meurer to sell privately owned valuables. On July 21, 1953, along with Paula Haubrich, Lotte Scheibler, Margarete Zanders, Edith Mendelssohn Bartholdy, Else Lang, she was one of the initiators of the new founding of the Cologne GEDOK, of which she was appointed honorary member on March 2, 1955.

In 1957, she was awarded the Federal Cross of Merit, 1st class, for her socio-political and cultural commitment.

== Family life ==
On July 25, 1896, she married the publisher of the Kölnische Zeitung and the Kölner Stadt-Anzeiger, Kommerzienrat Alfred Eduard Maria Johann Neven DuMont. The couple had four children: Paul Werner Josef Emil (born 1897), Elisabeth Henriette Christine (born 1899), Kurt Robert Hugo Aloisius (born1902) and Hildegard Emilie Margarethe (born 1904).

The eldest son Paul Werner died in the First World War on October 27, 1918, in Rilly-la-Montagne.

The Neven DuMont family lived in the Marienburg district of Cologne. After her death, Alice Neven DuMont was buried in the Neven DuMont family grave next to her husband and her son Paul Werner in Cologne's Melaten Cemetery (Parcel 63 A).

== Sozial and political Engagement (selection) ==
- Stadtverband Kölner Frauenvereine (Mitbegründerin, Zweite Vorsitzende)
- Nationale Frauengemeinschaft (Mitglied)
- Deutsche Gesellschaft für Mutter- und Kindesrecht (Vorsitzende)
- Verein zur Vermittlung von Heimarbeit (Vorsitzende)
- Kölner Hilfsverein für Wöchnerinnen, Säuglinge und Kranke (Vorsitzende)
- Müttererholungsverein (Vorsitzende)
- Ortsverein der GEDOK (Vorsitzende)
- Frauenverein für Verkaufsvermittlung von Wertgegenständen aus Privatbesitz e.V.
- Deutsche Volkspartei (Mitglied, Ortsvorstand Köln)

== Literature ==
- Katharina Regenbrecht: Alice Neven DuMont. In: Kölner Frauengeschichtsverein: "10 Uhr pünktlich Gürzenich." Hundert jahre bewegte Frauen in Köln – zur Geschichte der Organisationen und Vereine. Münster 1995, ISBN 3-929440-53-9, 264f.
