= Kölnische Rundschau =

Daily newspaper

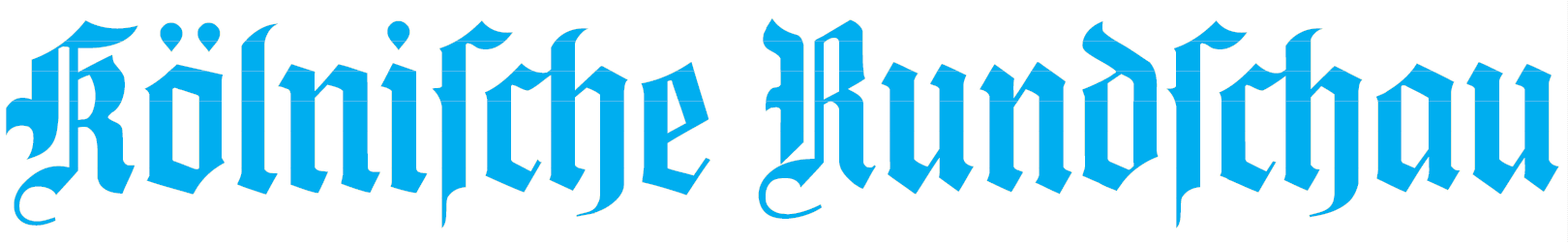
- Type: Daily newspaper (except Sundays)
- Publisher: M. DuMont Schauberg - expedition of the Kölnische Zeitung
- Editor-in-chief: Cordula von Wysocki
- Editor: Helmut Heinen
- Founded: 19 March 1946
- Circulation: 251,994
- Website: www.rundschau-online.de

The Kölnische Rundschau is a regional, independent daily newspaper for the Cologne/Bonn area. It is edited by Cologne Heinen-Verlag, which has its own independent local editorial office. The production of the national section was taken over by the Bonn General-Anzeiger during the first quarter of 2010. In the first quarter of 2018, the joint edition with the Kölner Stadt-Anzeiger sold 251,994 copies, a loss of 40% since 1999.

Since 1999 the title and publishing rights have been held by the publishing group M. DuMont Schauberg, which also publishes the Kölner Stadt-Anzeiger, the Express, the Berliner Zeitung, the Berliner Kurier, the Mitteldeutsche Zeitung and the Hamburger Morgenpost. On Fridays, the Rundschau includes the TV guide Prisma. In the past, the Kölnische Rundschau was regarded as conservative in comparison with the left oriented and liberal Kölner Stadt-Anzeiger.

== History ==
The Kölnische Rundschau was founded by the journalist and local politician Reinhold Heinen (1894-1969); it was first published on 19 March 1946. Heinen, who was imprisoned for four years in Sachsenhausen concentration camp during the Nazi period, received permission, along with other licensees, from the British occupying forces to publish a center-right (CDU) newspaper, but he did not accept this offer until after his journalistic independence had been ensured. This led to constant conflicts with Konrad Adenauer. One of the co-founders of the newspaper was the lawyer and politician Hugo Mönnig. The Allgemeine Kölnische Rundschau, a nationwide edition, was first published in 1948, but the paper lost millions and had to be closed in 1950. In 1952 the local newspaper Bergische Landeszeitung (Bergisch Gladbach) was taken over by Heider Verlag, which also took over the Oberbergische Volkszeitung in 1955. After the death of the newspaper founder Reinhold Heinen in 1969, his adopted son and later son-in-law Heinrich Heinen (1921-2008) became the sole editor of the Rundschau.

The former competitor, DuMont Schauberg, has been again allowed to publish the Kölner Stadt-Anzeiger since October 1949. The initially fierce journalistic and economic dispute between the two publishing houses has been replaced by an increasing cooperation since the 1980s. In 1982 DuMont acquired an equity interest in Heinen-Verlag. The editorial team remained independent even after DuMont took over the publishing rights in 1999. Since 8 May 2000 the newspaper editor is Helmut Heinen, the grandson of the founder and former president of the National Association of German Newspaper Publishers.

== Sales ==
The Kölnische Rundschau has been published conjointly with the Kölner Stadt-Anzeiger by M. DuMont Schauberg since 1999. Since then, both newspapers have lost 40% in sales. At the time of writing this represents 251,994 copies, which is a decrease of 167,673. The proportion of subscriptions stands at 85.8%.

== Local sections ==
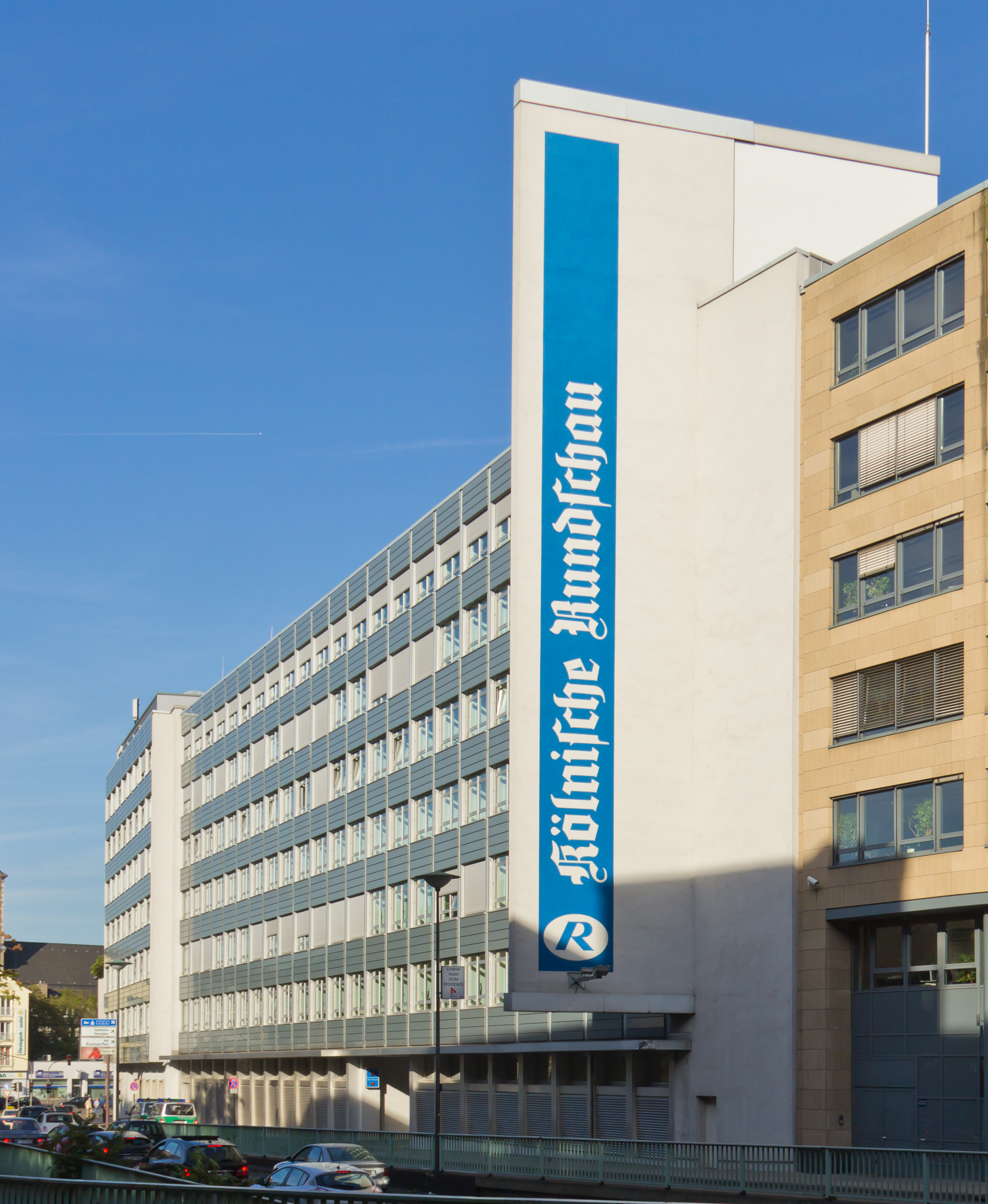
Kölnische Rundschau, house of the Cologne local editorial office in the Stolkgasse. View from the Tunisstraße.

The Kölnische Rundschau has local editorial offices which contribute to eight different local sections. The southern district, Ahrweiler, which is responsible for editing the Rhein-Ahr-Rundschau, was completely withdrawn on 1 May 2005. It was already the market leader in the district of Oberbergen (although this was disguised by a cooperation between the two publishers) before the withdrawal of the local office of the Kölner Stadt-Anzeiger. In 2014, local editorial offices of the Kölnische Rundschau and the Kölner Stadt-Anzeiger were outsourced to produce content for both newspapers. Now there are only independent local editorial offices in Cologne, Leverkusen and Bonn.

The Kölnische Rundschau and its subsidiary newspapers are distributed in the following independent cities or districts:

- Cologne (Kölnische Rundschau)
- Bonn (Bonn Rundschau)
- The district of Rhein-Erft (Rhein-Erft-Rundschau with a total of three editions)
- The district of Rhein-Sieg (Rhein-Sieg Rundschau)
- The district of Rheinisch-Bergischer (Bergische Landeszeitung)
- The district of Oberbergen (two editions: Bergische Landeszeitung, Oberbergische Volkszeitung)
- Euskirchen (Kölnische Rundschau with a total of two editions)
- Wipperfurth / Lindlar

== Editorial and departmental heads ==
The publisher Reinhold Heinen, Hans Rörig, Karl and Edmund Pesch held the position of editor-in-chief during the first years. Rudolf Heizler, who was also a lecturer in journalism at the University of Mainz, was editor-in-chief for more than a decade. Anton Sterzl was editor-in-chief from 1974 to 1979, followed by Jürgen C. Jagla until his death in 1992. Jagla was succeeded by Dieter Breuers, who was replaced after his retirement in 2000 by Jost Springensguth. Springensguth left the newspaper in the summer of 2009 to devote himself to other communicative work. The editorial office was then headed by Engelbert Greis and Cordula von Wysocki, who also took over the new editorials of local editions. Greis retired at the end of 2015.

Main edition

- Editor-in-Chief: Cordula von Wysocki
- National Section Officer: Raimund Neuß, Sandro Schmidt (Deputy)
- Culture: Hartmut Wilme
- Economy: Hermann Steveker
- Sports: Joachim Schmidt
- Local Cologne: Stefan Sommer
- Responsible for the content delivered by the Bonn newspaper printing company: Helge Matthiesen

Local issues

- Bonner Rundschau: Dieter Brockschnieder
- Rhein-Sieg Rundschau: Jürgen Röhrig
- Oberbergische Volkszeitung: Uta-Kristina Maul
- Bergische Landeszeitung: Sarah Brasack and Guido Wagner
- Rhein-Erft Rundschau: Bernd Rupprecht
- Editor Euskirchen: Christoph Heup
- Editors Gemünd: Christoph Heup
- Editorial staff Wipperfürth: Sarah Brasack and Guido Wagner
