= Alfred Neven du Mont =

Publisher (1868–1940)

Alfred Eduard Maria Neven DuMont (born February 20, 1868, in Cologne; died December 8, 1940, ibid.) was a German publisher.

== Life ==
Alfred Neven DuMont was born on February 20, 1868, into an important publishing dynasty in Cologne. Son of the publisher August Neven DuMont, Alfred studied law in Geneva and Strasbourg, and was then trained in the printing trade at the Vienna Hof- und Staatsdruckerei in 1890. In 1892, he joined his father's publishing house M. DuMont Schauberg, and managed the printing plant there. In 1895, he became an authorized signatory. When his father died the following year, Alfred Neven DuMont took over the management of the publishing house as a full partner together with his older brother Josef Neven DuMont. In 1915, he became senior partner of the company, managed it with his nephew August Neven DuMont.

Neven Dumont published the "Kölner Stadt-Anzeiger" and, from 1926, the "Kölnische Illustrierte Zeitung". He was also a commercial judge, Vice Chairman of the Association of German Newspaper Publishers (VDZV) and a member of the Board of the Association of Rhenish Newspaper Publishers.

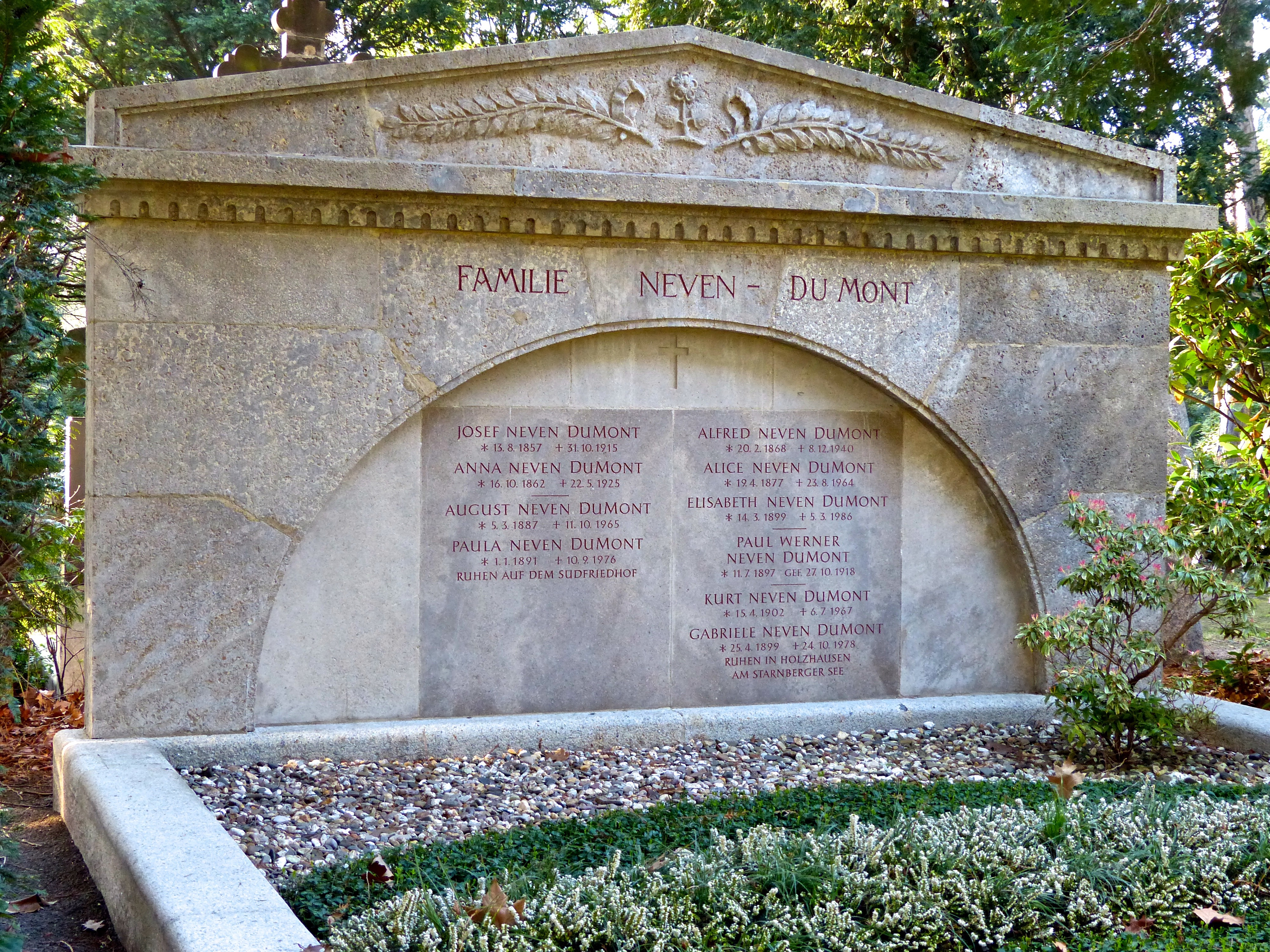
Grave of the Neven Dumont family at the Cologne Melaten Cemetery

Neven DuMont married to the women's rights activist Alice Minderop (1877-1964). The couple had two daughters and two sons: Paul (1897-1918) and Kurt Neven DuMont (1902-1967). Alfred Neven DuMont's grandson of the same name (1927-2015) was chairman of the supervisory board of the M. DuMont Schauberg group of companies from 1990 to early 2015.

Alfred Neven DuMont was buried in the family grave at Melaten Cemetery in Cologne (Parcel 63a).

- Awards Order of the Red Eagle 4th Class Title Kommerzienrat 1924: Honorary Senator of the German Academy of Sciences and Humanities 1927: Honorary doctorate (Dr. iur.) from the University of Cologne

== Literature ==
- Ulrich S. Soénius (1999). "Neven DuMont, Alfred Eduard Maria". Neue Deutsche Biographie (in German). Vol. 19. Berlin: Duncker & Humblot. pp. 191–191. (full text online).
- Neven DuMont, Alfred (Eduard Maria). In: Rudolf Vierhaus (Hrsg.): Deutsche Biographische Enzyklopädie (DBE). 2., überarbeitete und erweiterte Auflage. Band 7: Menghin–Pötel. De Gruyter, Berlin 2007, ISBN 978-3-11-094026-8, S. 440 (books.google.de – eingeschränkte Vorschau).
