= Heinrich Lindlar =

German musicologist

Heinrich Lindlar (6 August 1912 – 23 March 2009) was a German musicologist and music educator.

== Life ==
Lindlar was born in Bergisch Gladbach. After studying music and musicology in Cologne, Bonn and Berlin, Lindlar was awarded the title of Dr. phil. with a work published in 1940 on Hans Pfitzners Klavierlied. After the Second World War he worked as music critic first for the General-Anzeiger in Bonn, later also for various national daily newspapers and specialist publications. From 1952 he published the series of publications Musik der Zeit, from 1958 the Kontrapunkte.

In 1965 he went to the Hochschule für Musik Freiburg, where he was given the chair for modern music history. In 1969 he moved to Cologne as director of the Rheinische Musikschule. There he promoted the expansion of the school to a conservatory of a modern kind until his retirement in 1976. In addition, he taught at the Hochschule für Musik und Tanz Köln. Lindlar's often quoted critical examination of Karlheinz Stockhausens work prompted him to resign as director of the Cologne Courses for Neue Musik at the Rheinische Musikschule when Lindlar became director of the institute.

Among his numerous publications some are considered standard works, such as the Wörterbuch der Musik published by Suhrkamp or his lexicon on Igor Stravinsky and Béla Bartók.

== Publications ==
- Hans Pfitzners Klavierlied. (Dissertation), Würzburg 1940
- Igor Strawinskys sakraler Gesang – Geist und Form der christ-kultischen Kompositionen. Regensburg 1957
- 77 Premieren – Ein Opern-Journal. Kritisches und Ketzerisches aus 7 Jahren, Rodenkirchen/Rh. 1965
- Hermann Reutter – Werk und Wirken (Festschrift, ed.), Mainz, London etc. 1965
- Meyers Handbuch über die Musik. (Edited and published by.), 4. ed., Mannheim 1971
- Lübbes Strawinsky-Lexikon. Bergisch Gladbach 1982, ISBN 3-7857-0312-0
- Lübbes Bartok-Lexikon, Bergisch Gladbach 1982, ISBN 3-7857-0362-7
- Wörterbuch der Musik, Frankfurt 1989, ISBN 3-518-37952-6
- Leben mit Musik – Aufsätze - Vorträge, Cologne 1960 - 1992 (Festschrift for the 80th birthday, ed. by Hans Elmar Bach), Köln-Rodenkirchen 1992, ISBN 3-920950-00-3
- Igor Strawinsky – Lebenswege, Bühnenwerke, Zürich and St. Gallen 1994, ISBN 3-7265-6031-9
- Loreley-Report – Heinrich Heine und die Rheinlied-Romantik. Köln-Rheinkassel 1999, ISBN 3-925366-52-0
