= Kurt Neven DuMont =

German publisher (1902–1967)

Kurt Neven DuMont (April 15, 1902, in Cologne – July 6, 1967, in Munich) was a German newspaper publisher and Nazi Party member.

== Ancestry and education ==
Born on April 15, 1902, in Cologne, Kurt Neven DuMont was youngest son of the publisher Alfred Neven DuMont (1868-1940) and his wife Alice (1877–1964).

== Professional career ==
Neven DuMont joined the management of his parents' publishing company and large printing house M. DuMont Schauberg on January 1, 1927, after training in a Berlin publishing house. In 1933, with his cousin August Neven DuMont, he became an equal owner of the family business, which published the Kölnische Zeitung (since 1805), the Kölnische Illustrierte Zeitung (since 1926) and the Sonntag Morgen (since 1932), as well as the Kölner Stadt-Anzeiger (since 1876).

== Career in the Nazi era ==
Kurt Neven DuMont joined the Nazi Pary on May 1, 1937.

Weeks before the Nazis came to power in 1933, Neven Dumont adhered to the Nazi line - earlier than other publishers. In its New Year's issue of January 1, 1933, the Kölnische Illustrierte Zeitung printed a euphoric article about fascist youth education in Italy, the Kölnische Zeitung headlined on the same day: "It all depends on Hitler!" and predicted: "The year 1933 confronts Hitler with the decision whether he wants to remain at the gates of politics as an idolized leader and perhaps also as a martyr of a religious community, or whether he is prepared to bear the responsibility of throwing the positive forces of his movement into the scales of practical politics. In the interest of national consolidation, one would hope that Hitler would find the second way."

In its issue of November 11, 1933, the Kölnische Illustrierte Zeitung transformed the front page into a ballot paper. In the background of the picture montage, masses of people can be seen raising their hands in the Hitler salute. Neven DuMont also embraced the National Socialists' ideas on "degenerate art". The front page, dated June 13, 1940, showed "victorious German soldiers" and a photo of a captured African colonial soldier. The caption read, "With this scum of humanity, the French wanted to conquer German cultural land in 1940, too." On the tenth anniversary of the seizure of power in 1943, the Kölnische Illustrierte Zeitung honored Adolf Hitler as the "creator of the Greater German Reich" with his likeness on the cover.

In 1941, the Reich Propaganda Ministry banned the centrist Kölnische Volkszeitung, a Catholic newspaper published by the Christian publishing house J. Bachem for 80 years. It was a direct competitor to DuMont's Kölnische Zeitung. Its editor Reinhold Heinen was sent to Sachsenhausen concentration camp for four years because of his conservative activities critical of the state. Kurt Neven DuMont took over the subscriber base of the Kölnische Volkszeitung at a price of 23 Reichsmarks per customer. His contributions to the NSDAP, increased from 500 Reichsmark (1940) to 6500 Reichsmark in 1941 and 1942.

The publishing house M. DuMont Schauberg had good relations with the German army which distributed The Kölnische Zeitung to German soldiers on the front. In the summer of 1944, Neven DuMont was awarded the 1st Class Cross of War Merit with Swords by the Reich Ministry for Public Enlightenment and Propaganda, which honored special services under enemy fire or in military warfare.

== Postwar ==
Following the defeat of Nazi Germany by the Allies, Cologne newspapers needed a press license to resume publication from the Allied authorities. While other newspapers received the licence, Kurt Neven DuMont was refused by the military government. It was only after the abolition of the licensing requirement for daily newspapers with the founding of the Federal Republic that Neven DuMont was able to publish the first edition of the Kölner Stadt-Anzeiger after World War II on October 29, 1949.

As part of Neven DuMont's denazification procedure, in 1946 the Allied military government, put a blocking notice on a property acquired by Neven DuMont. A restitution claim was filed for Ottenheimer with the Restitution Office of the Cologne Regional Court in April 1950. After a settlement paying Ottenheimer 10,000 marks, the restitution claim was withdrawn.

The publishing house rejected claims that Kurt Neven DuMont and his wife had benefited from the Aryanization of Jewish assets and filed successful lawsuits against Der Spiegel magazine demanding the removal of its reporting about one of the properties. The European Court of Human Rights ruled in favor of the DuMonts.

== Succession ==
In September 1953, Kurt Neven DuMont's son, Alfred Neven DuMont, joined the publishing house M. DuMont-Schauberg, where he was initially the journalistic director of the Kölner Stadt-Anzeiger from 1955. In 1960, he switched to the publishing side and, together with Ernst Brücher, a son-in-law of Kurt Neven DuMont, and Dieter Schütte, August Neven DuMont's son-in-law, became partners of the M. DuMont-Schauberg company.

Kurt Neven DuMont was married to Gabriele DuMont, née von Lenbach, daughter of the painter Franz von Lenbach, and had four children. Neven DuMont died on July 6, 1967, at the age of 65 in the University Hospital in Munich. His gravesite is at the Holzhausen cemetery on Lake Starnberg. The successor as sole editor of the press products published by the publishing house was his son Alfred Neven DuMont.

Since 1976, the West German Academy for Communication has awarded an annual Dr. Kurt Neven DuMont Medal, donated by Alfred Neven DuMont, "for special services to advertising."

== Revelations and biographies ==
Neven DuMont's role during the Nazi era was omitted from the company's official history and not generally known until the 21st century.

In February 2006, M. DuMont Schauberg company announced that it would hire an historian to review of this part of the publishing house's history, engaging Manfred Pohl in May 2006. Pohl published M. DuMont Schauberg. Der Kampf um die Unabhängigkeit des Zeitungsverlags unter der NS-Diktatur. (M. DuMont Schauberg. The Struggle for Independence of the Newspaper Publishing House under the Nazi Dictatorship) in 2009.

== Offices and memberships ==
- Member of the Stahlhelm Member of the Nazi SA Member of the Nazi Party (National Socialist German Workers' Party or NSDAP)
- Member of the Supervisory Board of dpa in Hamburg
- Member of the Executive Board of the Verein Rheinisch-Westfälischer Zeitungsverleger (Rhenish-Westphalian Newspaper Publishers Association)
- Member of the Executive Committee of the Federal Association of German Newspaper Publishers
- Chairman of the Radio and Television Committee of the Television Commission of the Federal Association of German Newspaper Publishers
- Founding member and first president of the Rhenish-Westphalian Advertising School der SA

== Literature ==
- Manfred Pohl: M. DuMont Schauberg. Der Kampf um die Unabhängigkeit des Zeitungsverlags unter der NS-Diktatur. Campus Verlag 2009, ISBN 3-593-38919-3
- Werner Rügemer: Colonia Corrupta. Münster 2002, ISBN 3-89691-525-8
- Hans Schmitz: Kölner Stadt-Anzeiger. Das Comeback einer Zeitung 1949–1989. Köln 1989, ISBN 3-7701-2478-2
- Ulrich S. Soénius (1999). "Neven DuMont, Kurt Robert Hugo Felix Aloisius". Neue Deutsche Biographie (in German). Vol. 19. Berlin: Duncker & Humblot. p. 191. (full text online).
- Kurt Weinhold: Die Geschichte eines Zeitungshauses 1620–1945. Köln 1969, ISBN 3-7701-2478-2
