= Neven du Mont =

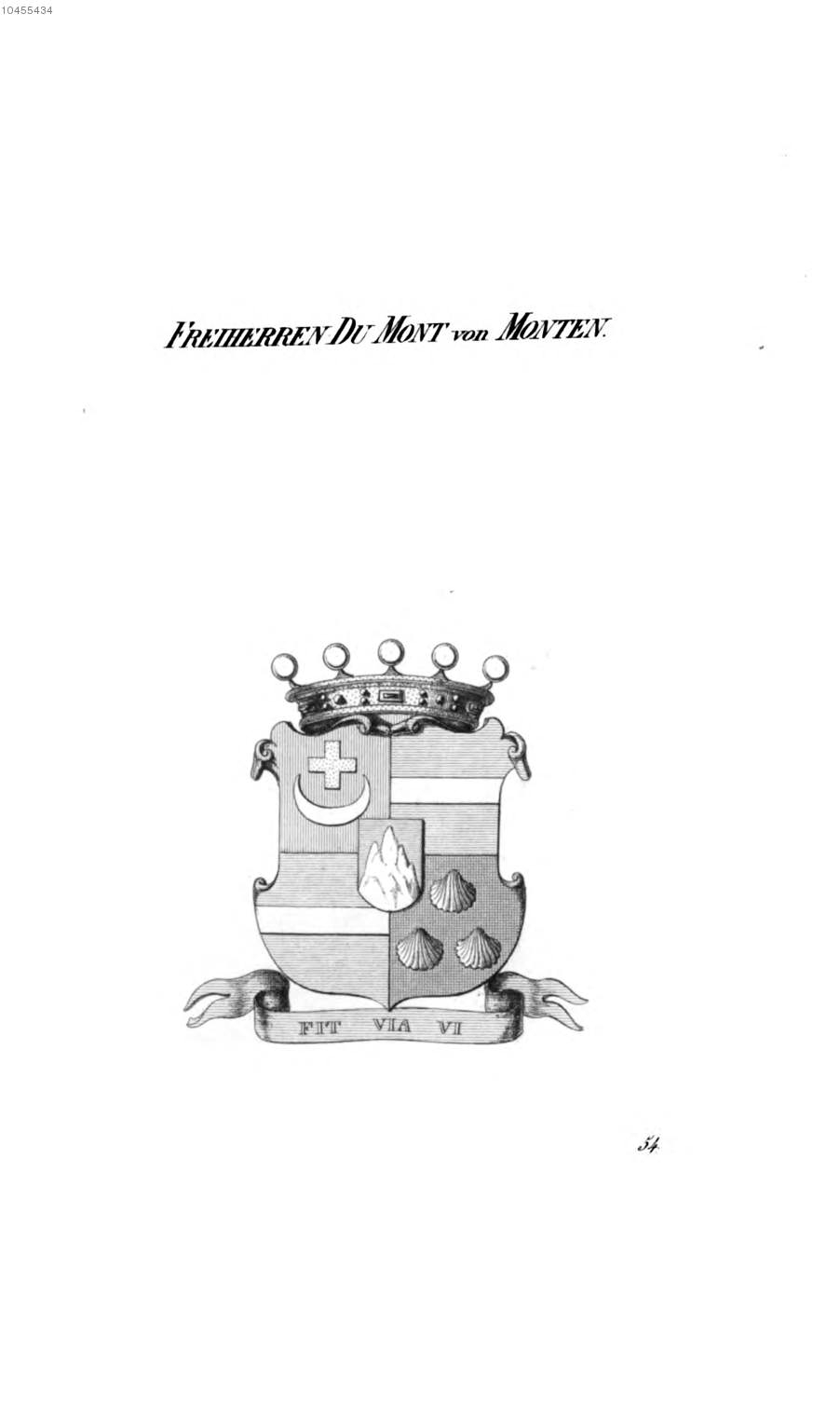
Coat of arms of the Du Mont family

The Neven du Mont family is a German noble family of Belgian and Spanish origin, whose members had served in the Kingdom of Prussia as well as in the armies of the Kingdom of Castile.

== Notable members ==
- August Neven du Mont, German painter and aristocrat, the first foreign Master of Foxhounds in England
- Mark Neven du Mont, writer and aristocrat
- Alfred Neven DuMont, a German publisher and owner of publishing house M. DuMont Schauberg,
- Konstantin Neven DuMont, son of A. Neven DuMont and former publisher of Kölner Stadt-Anzeiger
- Chiquita Neven du Mont, German socialite, former fashion model and jewellery designer, mother of German actor Sky du Mont
- Sky du Mont, German actor
- Clemens Neven du Mont, German-born socialite and oldest son of German actor Sky du Mont.
