= Else Falk =

German women's rights activist (1872–1956)

Else Falk (born April 25 1872 as Elise Wahl in Barmen; † January 8, 1956 in São Paulo) was a German women's rights activist and social politician during the Weimar Republic. She was a founder and active member of Cologne women's and welfare associations and a promoter of numerous social projects. From 1919 to 1933, she was chairwoman of the City Federation of Cologne Women's Associations. Because of her Jewish heritage, she was forced by the Nazis to resign from the chairmanship of the city association on March 22, 1933.

== Early life ==
Else Wahl was born in Barmen as the fourth of seven children of the Jewish Kommerzienrat Hermann Wahl and his wife Henny. The father ran the textile business S & R Wahl here, was a promoter of the Barmer Bergbahn and founder of the local synagogue congregation. At the age of 22, Else married Bernhard Falk, a lawyer from Bergheim, in Barmen. After her husband was admitted to the Cologne Higher Regional Court, the family moved to Cologne (Christophstraße 39) in 1898. The family moved in the circles of Rhenish assimilated Jewry, among others in the Central-Verein deutscher Staatsbürger jüdischen Glaubens (Central Association of German Citizens of the Jewish Faith) of 1893. Her husband was involved in the National Liberal Association of Coeln and was elected to the Cologne City Council in 1908.

== Activism: Women's suffrage, libraries, food distribution ==
Before World War I, Else Falk - together with Rosa Bodenheimer, Mathilde von Mevissen and Klara Caro - campaigned for women's suffrage in the Cologne chapter of the Prussian National Association for Women's Suffrage. In 1914, Else Falk was elected treasurer of the National Women's Association. During World War I, she initiated numerous social projects, especially to alleviate the plight of war invalids and widows with their children. In 1918, for example, she set up the first public library for the war-blind in Cologne and ran a shoemaker's workshop to provide an income for war invalids. To increase the stock of books for the library for the blind, she and a group of women punched out books in Braille.

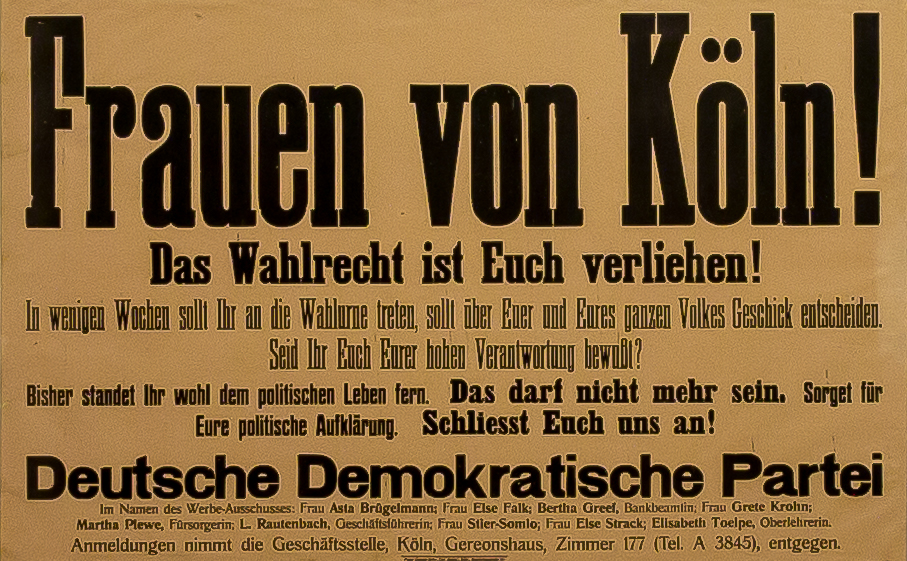
Appeal of the German Democratic Party for the enforcement of women's suffrage, signed among others by Else Falk (1919)

In 1919, she was elected chairwoman of the City Federation of Cologne Women's Associations, in which up to 20,000 Cologne women were organized, a position she was to hold until March 1933. She was part of the organizing committee that hosted the 1921 Reichstagung of the Federation of German Women's Associations in Cologne's Gürzenich.

During the hyperinflation, after the departure of the Quakers who helped to ensure the food supply in Cologne after the First World War, she organized the food distribution in the Association for Child Feeding in the City Association to provide food to needy families. Due to hyperinflation, large parts of Cologne's population became impoverished. In order to provide emergency relief, especially for impoverished widows, she campaigned for the construction of housing for small pensioners. In the following ten years, four homes for the elderly were built on their initiative. In 1923, she became involved - together with Josephine Erkens - in the establishment of the Cologne Women's Welfare Police. This rather socially oriented institution had a store in Cologne where it advertised its social assistance services. In addition to women from Cologne, English officers also served in the first Women's Welfare Police in the British occupation zone.

== Activism: welfare, working mothers and abuse victims ==
Starting in 1925, Else Falk, together with Alice Neven DuMont, published the news bulletin of the Stadtverband Kölner Frauenvereine, which was a weekly supplement in the Kölner Stadt-Anzeiger and provided information on topics and events specific to women. In the same year, she founded the Cologne chapter of the 5th Welfare Association and in 1930 took over the chairmanship of this federation of Cologne institutions of independent welfare work.

In the second half of the 1920s, Else Falk devoted herself to the care of working mothers. Women with few means, who were exhausted and overworked, were to be given the opportunity to recover in mothers' cures. To this end, she founded the Verein für Müttererholung und Mütterschulung and the Örtliche Erholungsfürsorge für Mutter und Kind. The construction of various facilities, such as the recreation home for working women in Hummelsheim (1927) and the professional women's home at Bornheimer Strasse 4 in Cologne-Zollstock (1930), can be traced back to her initiative. Recreational gardens were set up for the women in Cologne-Brück. To honor her commitment to women's welfare, the residential home for working women in Zollstock was renamed Else-Falk-Haus shortly after its inauguration. As early as 1927, she supported Hertha Kraus in setting up the Riehler Heimstätten homes for the elderly and infirm, which were converted from former barracks buildings.

Another of Else Falk's concerns was the fight against alcohol abuse, as it was the cause of domestic violence and further impoverishment in many working-class families. In 1927, she co-founded the Cologne GOA (Restaurants without Alcohol). In addition to restaurants where no alcohol was served, the GOA initiative supplied events, factories and construction sites with inexpensive, healthy food on a mobile basis using vehicles. It also campaigned for the establishment of so-called refreshment rooms in university and court dining halls.

== Art and politics ==
In 1927, she was one of the founding members of the Cologne chapter of the women artists' association GEDOK, together with Alice Neven DuMont, numerous women artists and patrons of the Cologne society. In addition to her social project work in Cologne, Else Falk held board positions in numerous supraregional associations and political organizations, including the Allgemeiner Deutscher Frauenverein, the Arbeitsgemeinschaft der Stadtverbände von Rheinland und Westfalen, the Rheinisch-Westfälischer Frauenverband, and the Bund Deutscher Frauenvereine.

After women were admitted to political parties, Else Falk was chairwoman of the National Liberal Women's Group. In 1918, she joined the newly founded, left-liberal German Democratic Party. In committees of the Cologne City Council, she represented the interests of women and the poor population of Cologne.

Concerned about political developments in Germany, in 1932 she was one of the signatories of an appeal by the Cologne women's associations against Hitler's election as Reich Chancellor. In the same year, she joined the German State Party, which had been newly formed in 1930 from the German Democratic Party. Here she was elected as the main confidant for the Cologne-Aachen constituency.

== Nazi persecution ==
When the Nazis came to power in Germany in 1933, Falk was persecuted because of her Jewish heritage. Two weeks after the Reichstag elections in March 1933, Else Falk, a Jew, was forced to resign from the chairmanship of the Cologne Women's Association, which she had held for more than 13 years. Her duties were taken over by Alice Neven-DuMont, who incorporated the Mothers' Recreation Association founded by Else Falk into the Nazi Women's Association on July 18, 1933.

Despite the increasing exclusion, Else Falk continued to be committed to the Jewish women artists who were excluded from the GEDOK because of their religious affiliation. She headed the Jewish Art Community in Cologne from 1934 to 1938. Bernhard and Else Falk were forced to change apartments in Cologne several times after 1933. During the November pogroms in 1938, the Falk family's apartment was completely devastated. In spring 1939 the family emigrated to Belgium. Friends of the family gave the family shelter in Brussels, Rue du Beffroi 41, and protected them from the grasp of the Gestapo. Her husband Bernhard died on December 23, 1944, in exile in Brussels, which had been liberated by the Allies in September 1944. After the war, when she no longer had any family ties to Cologne, she settled with her son in Brazil. She died in São Paulo at the age of 83.

== Private life ==
On April 3, 1894, Else Wahl married the Bergheim lawyer Bernhard Falk in Barmen. Four sons were born of this marriage. The eldest son Alfred (born 1895) was killed in action in January 1917 as an officer in Manfred von Richthofen's fighter squadron. The second-born son Fritz (born 1898), who was married to Margarete Oevel, held a doctorate in law from the Higher Regional Court in Düsseldorf. On September 11, 1933, after his work permit was revoked and he was increasingly marginalized and humiliated due to Nai persecution, he committed suicide.

Their son Ernst (1901-1978) also worked as a lawyer with a doctorate and, like his parents, had to emigrate to Belgium in 1939. He later fled to South America via France and settled in Brazil. His mother followed him after the death of her husband to spend the rest of her life in São Paulo. The youngest son Hermann (born 1905) also graduated and emigrated to Sydney in 1932.

== Honors ==
In 1930, the house for working women at Bornheimer Strasse 4 in Cologne-Zollstock, built by Wilhelm Riphahn and the Association of Women Post and Telegraph Officers, was named after Else Falk. During her last stay in Cologne - she visited the city in 1952 at the invitation of Konrad Adenauer - a memorial plaque was erected on this building and a banquet was given in her honor.

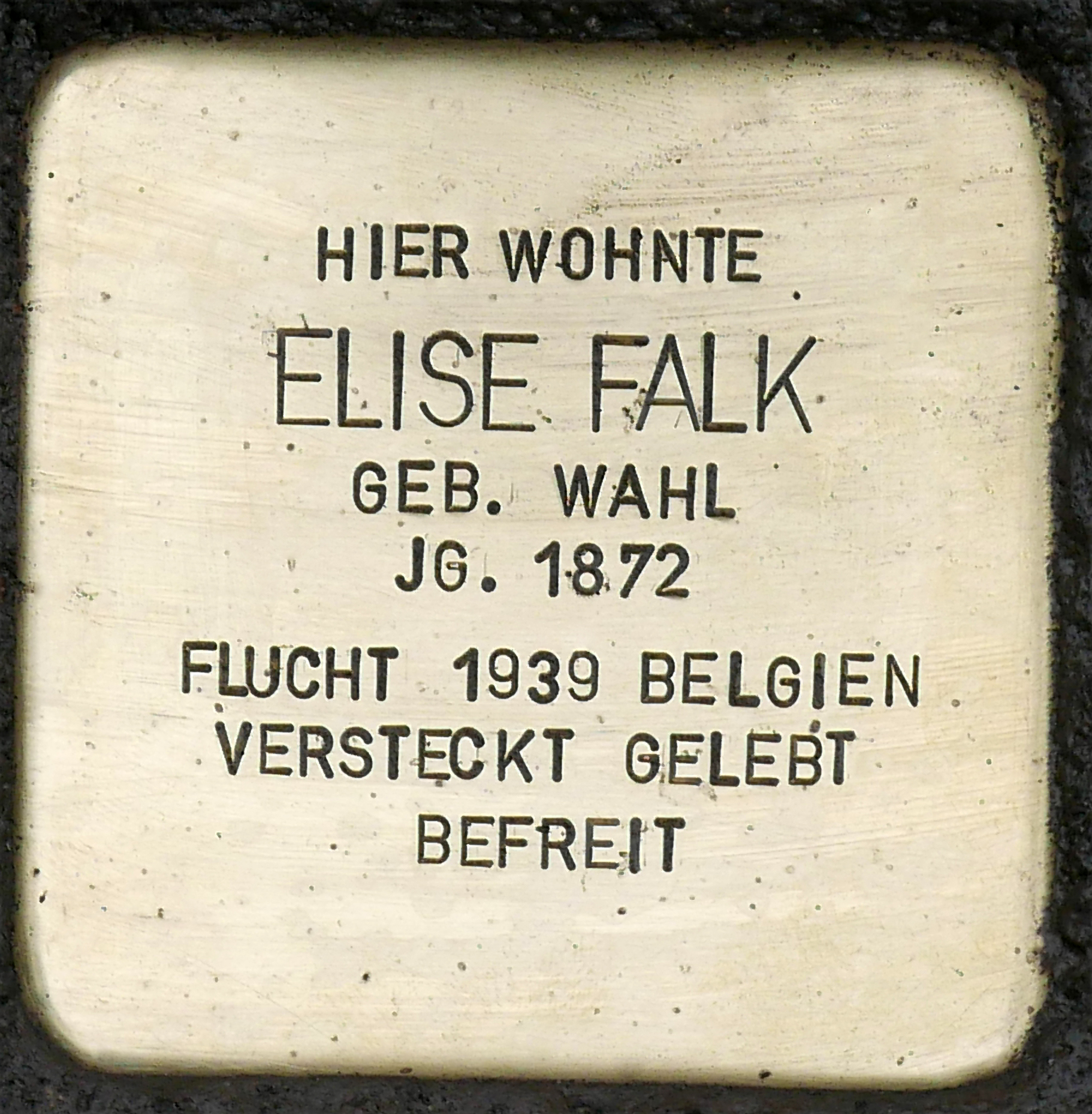
Stolperstein für El(i)se Falk, Novalisstraße 2 in Köln-Bayenthal

On the initiative of the Cologne Women's History Association, a street in Cologne-Longerich now commemorates the social politician. At the suggestion of the Working Group of Cologne Women's Associations (AKF Cologne), the City of Cologne decided in July 2019 to offer a prize for outstanding women's and equality work, named after Else Falk and endowed with 5,000 euros. On March 6, 2020, this prize was awarded for the first time: to Frauke Mahr of the Cologne-based association Lobby für Mädchen e.V. The second prize winner in 2022 was Behshid Najafi, a German-Iranian who works to combat discrimination against migrant and refugee women..

On October 5, 2020, in front of the long-time residence of the Falk family in Cologne-Bayenthal - initiated by the Rhineland-Cologne Section of the German Alpine Club - stumbling blocks were laid by the artist Gunter Demnig in memory of Else Falk, her husband Bernhard and their son Ernst Hermann.

== Literature ==
- Rosemarie Ellscheid: Der Stadtverband Kölner Frauenvereine. Ein Kapitel Frauenbewegung und Zeitgeschichte von 1909–1933. Köln 1983.
- Sully Roecken: Der Stadtverband Kölner Frauenvereine und seine angeschlossenen Vereine. In: Kölner Frauengeschichtsverein (Hrsg.): „10 Uhr pünktlich Gürzenich“ – Hundert Jahre bewegte Frauen in Köln. Agenda-Verlag, Münster 1995, ISBN 3-929440-53-9, 183–219.
- Irene Franken: Else Falk – ein Quell der Frauenenergien. In dies. (Hrsg.): Frauen in Köln – Der historische Stadtführer, J.P. Bachem, Köln 2008, ISBN 978-3-7616-2029-8, S. 265–267.
