= Irene Meichsner =

German science journalist and author

Irene Meichsner (born 1952 in Bonn) is a German science journalist and author. She works for Kölner Stadtanzeiger, a newspaper in Cologne and as a freelance journalist and book author.

== Background ==
Meichsner has studied philosophy and history at Cologne and Freiburg universities. Her doctorate in 1982 ("Über die Logik von Gemeinplätzen", On the Logic of Platitudes) dealt with platitudes and truisms from a philosophical standpoint.

Since 1981 she works as journalist in Cologne. Meichsner is responsible for the science pages of Kölner Stadtanzeiger. Some of her books comprise collections of her newspaper columns.

1990 a report of Meichsner about a conflict between two female philosophers at Cologne university gained nationwide coverage. Marion Soreth, professor of philosophy in Cologne previously had accused Elisabeth Ströker, a distinguished Phenomenology (philosophy) expert and professor at the same faculty, of plagiarism in her doctorate. Meichsners article "Hübsch geklaut (Nicely stolen)" was published first in the Kölner Stadtanzeiger and then by the Hamburg weekly Die Zeit. The Bonn Faculty saw Strökers doctorate as being "substantially her own" besides more than 100 scholars sent an open letter in support of her.

1992 Meichsner published a book with coauthors Gerd Rosenkranz and Manfred Kriener (both former die Tageszeitung publishers) about the public relations strategies of the Nuclear Power industry. Greenpeace provided a prologue and endorsed the book in the framework of a larger campaign against Nuclear energy.

Together with Egmont R. Koch, a journalist which had grown famous in Germany with his landmark book ("Seveso ist überall") about the Seveso disaster, Meichnser published 1990 a book about possible abuse of Blood donations in eastern Germany.

Meichsner received 2005 the Georg von Holtzbrinck Price for Science Journalism.

2010 an article of Meichner about purported errors in the IPCC reports in Frankfurter Rundschau was taken down after a demand of Stefan Rahmstorf towards the newspaper. In 2011, a civil case was successfully brought by Meichsner against Rahmstorf. The circumstances gained nationwide coverage in Spiegel Online and Die Welt Online after a critical report of the science journalists association journal WPK Quarterly.

== Books ==
- Warum kriegt der Specht kein Kopfweh? (Why Woodpeckers do not get headaches, with Nicola Kuhrt). Dumont, Köln 2008. ISBN 3-8321-8062-1
- Die neue Offensive der Atomwirtschaft. Treibhauseffekt, Sicherheitsdiskussion, Markt im Osten. (the renewed offensive of the nuclear industry - Greenhouse effect, Security, Eastern markets, with Gerd Rosenkranz & Manfred Kriener):Beck, München 1992, ISBN 3-406-34085-7
- BÖSES BLUT. Die Geschichte eines Medizin-Skandals. (Bad Blood, history of a science scandal, with Egmont R. Koch) Hamburg: Hoffmann und Campe, 1990 (²1993), ISBN 3-455-10312-X
