= Operation Kaninchenjagd =

German political controversy

Operation Kaninchenjagd ("Operation rabbit hunting") is one of two titles of an anonymous paper that became public in September 2016 and led to accusations against the German politician and incumbent general secretary of the Christian Democratic Party (CDU), Peter Tauber. It is alleged that Mr. Tauber – who was at that time member of the CDU and the (regional) chairman of the Young Union in Hesse – was involved in (attempted) bullying of another member and employee of the CDU.

The eight pages long paper "Operation Kaninchenjagd" has no date but it is undisputed by all and supported by the content that it was created in 2006 after the election of Tom Zeller as the new local chairman of the CDU in the Main-Kinzig district and the paper is addressed to him by the salutation "Lieber Tom" (Dear Tom). In an early interview with the German newspaper Frankfurter Rundschau, Tom Zeller implied that Sebastian Zimmer or Peter Tauber or both were the authors of the paper.

In 2006 the new guard around Tom Teller and others, including Mr. Tauber, wanted to dismiss Mrs. Anne Höhne-Weigl who was at that time the (local) manager of the party in the Main-Kinzig district and also a member of the district council. As German law made it difficult for an employer to dismiss an employee when serving as a member of a parliament or council, the paper "Operation Kaninchenjagd" elaborates how to persuade her into signing a termination agreement. If she wouldn't give in it is recommended in the paper to harass her and to threaten her to dismiss her daughter. But Mrs. Anne Höhne-Weigl found the paper at that time and was therefore warned and she worked for the party til her retirement in 2014.

On 29 September 2016, the county chairman of the CDU in Main-Kinzig fiercely defended in a public statement Mr. Tauber and thereby attacked a "former employee" (feminine form, most likely Mrs. Anne Höhne-Weigl). On 30 September 2016, Mr. Tauber spoke at the regional assembly of the CDU in Bruchköbel and acknowledged that he knew the paper and that it was against the values of the party and regretted that he didn't report it, but denied any involvement in the creation. He further alleged that those who published the paper were guilty of harming the party.
