= M. DuMont Schauberg =

Publishing house in Germany

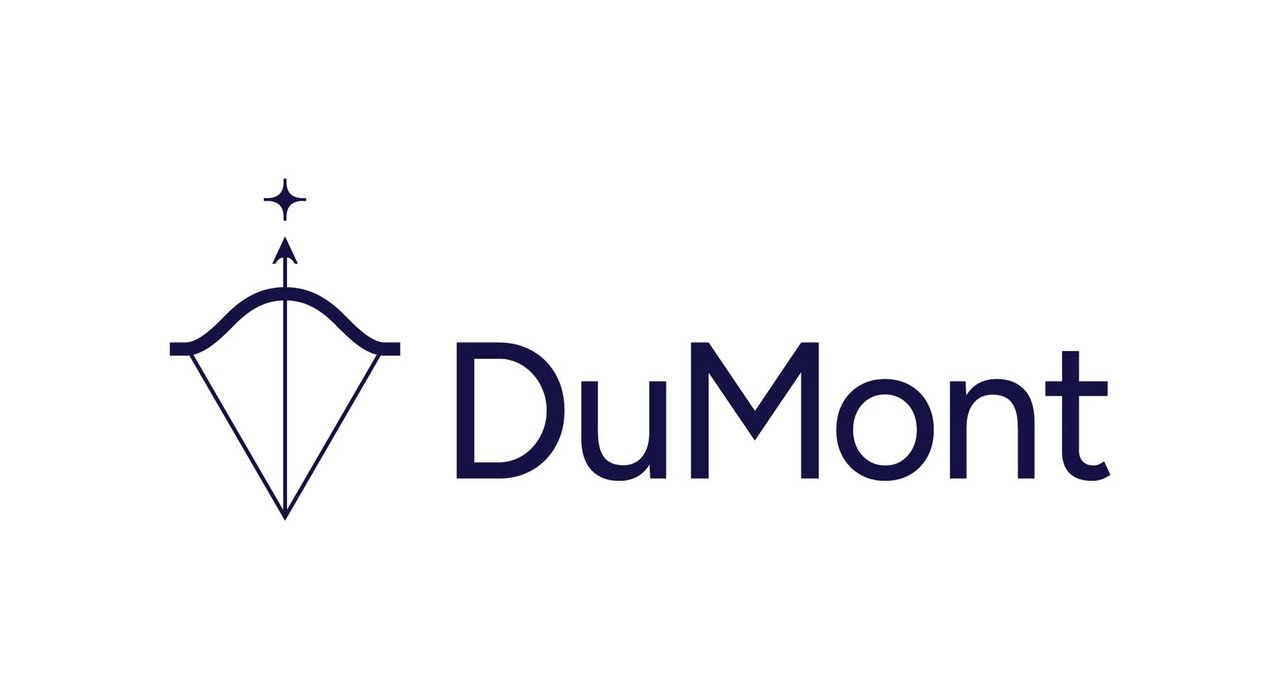
- Type: Private (GmbH & Co. KG)
- Industry: Mass media
- Founded: 1802
- Founder: Bertram Hilden
- Headquarters: Cologne, Germany
- Area served: Worldwide
- Key people: Christoph Bauer (CEO)
- Products: Broadcasting, publishing, cable, book clubs, music labels, radio, film-/TV-production
- Revenue: ▲€671.25 million (2013)
- Number of employees: 4,254 (2011)
- Website: www.dumont.de

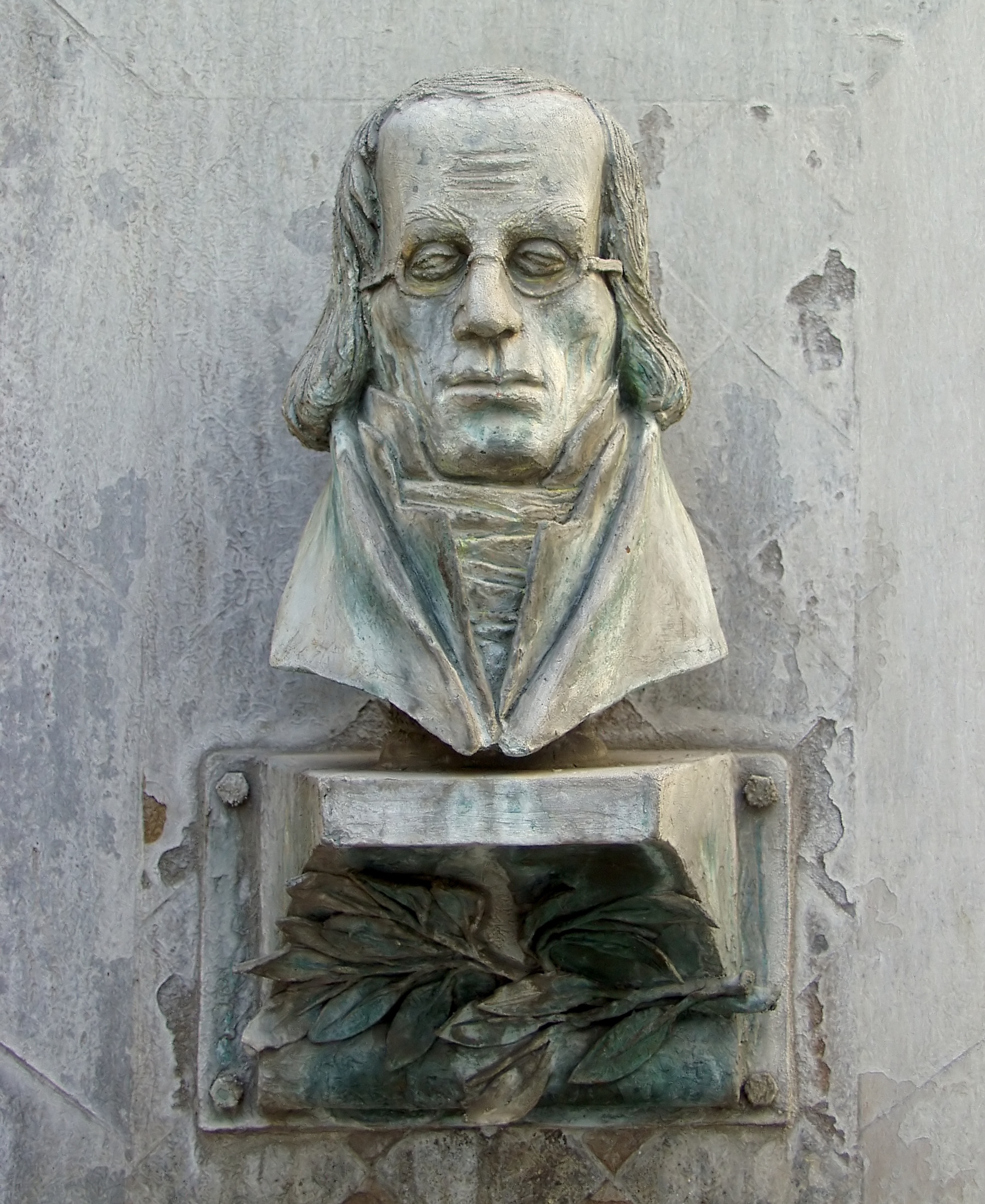
Relief of Marcus du Mont on the DuMont-Brunnen in Cologne

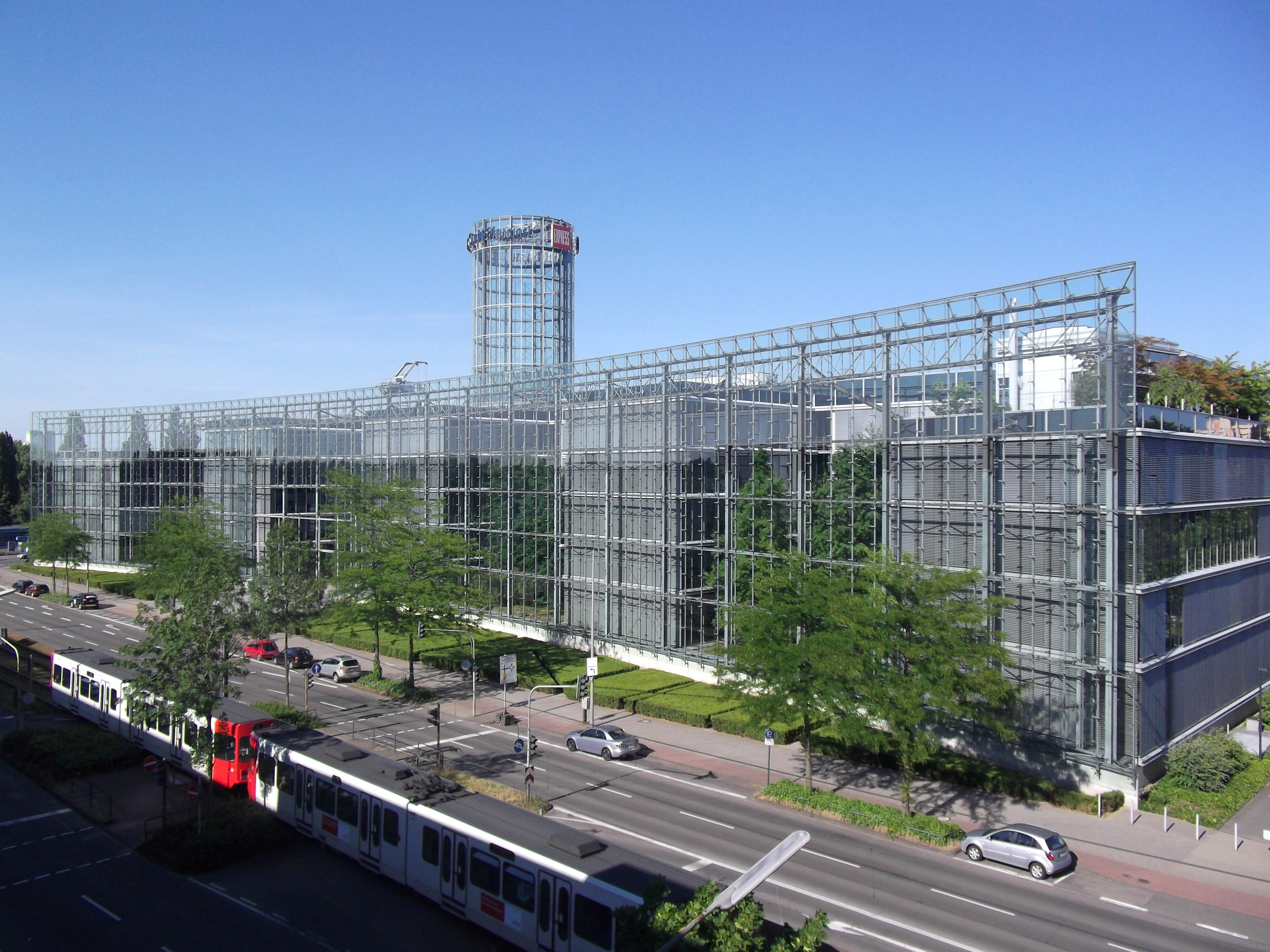
DuMont Headquarter in Cologne

Du Mont Mediagroup (formally M. DuMont Schauberg) is one of Germany's oldest and largest publishing houses. It was founded by Bertram Hilden in 1620 and is owned by Isabella Neven DuMont and Christian DuMont Schütte.

As a publishing house, the DuMont Media Group has no rigid party-political affiliation, though historically and editorially it can be situated within the spectrum ranging from left-liberal to centerism.

== History ==
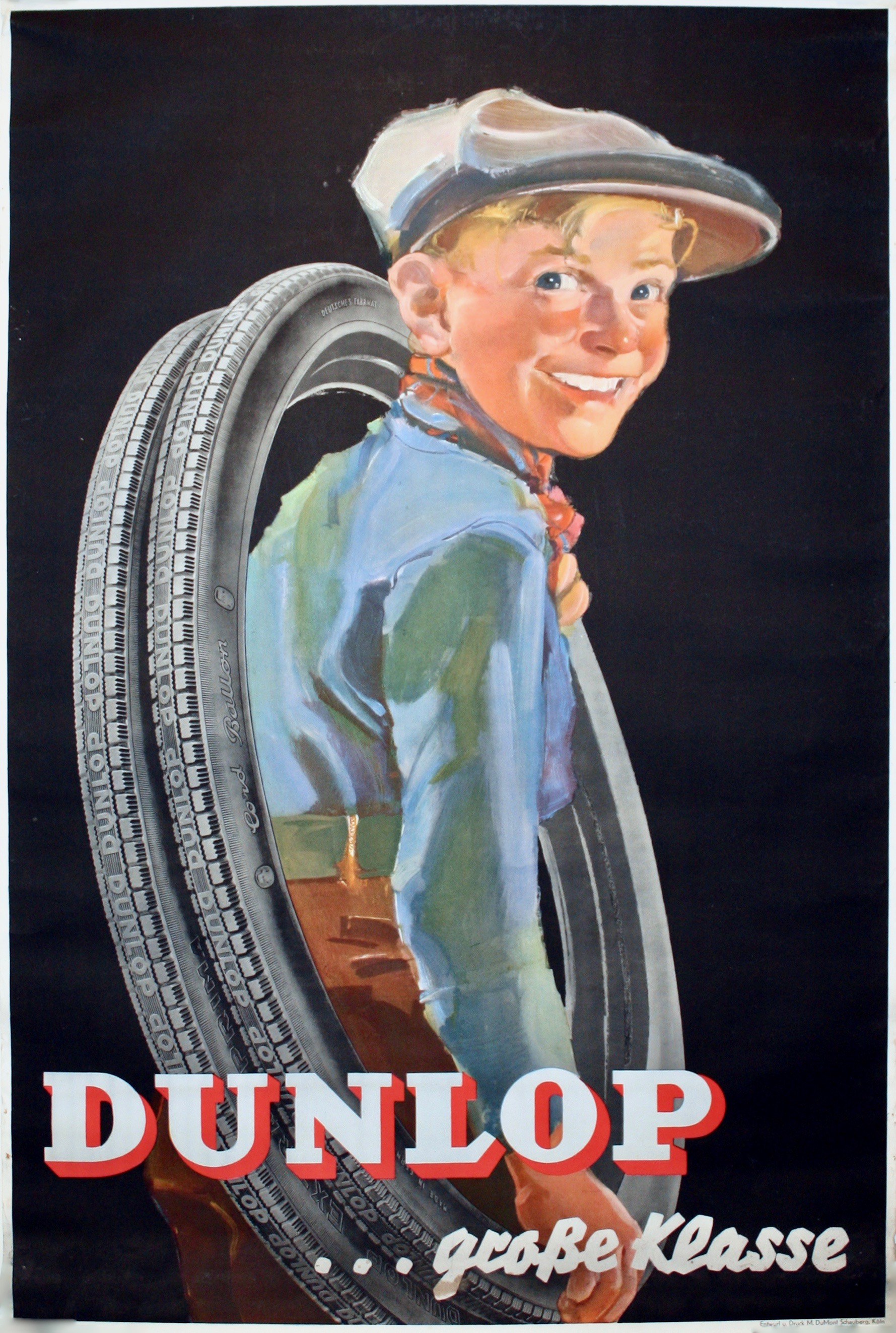
Advertising for Dunlop Tyres (1925)

The company has been run by the Neven du Mont family since 1805, when Marcus du Mont acquired the Kölnische Zeitung – then the business's main newspaper. M. DuMont Schauberg has acquired numerous local and national newspapers and magazines. DuMont Schauberg's father, Kurt Neven DuMont, was a member of the German Nazi party, while his publishing house promoted Nazi ideology.

The company's headquarters is located in Cologne. The largest newspaper published by M. DuMont Schauberg is the Kölner Stadt-Anzeiger, published since 1876. It has the largest circulation in the Cologne/Bonn Region.

Between 2019 and 2020 DuMont sold Berliner Verlag and later Mitteldeutsche Zeitung and Hamburger Morgenpost. Only the local newspapers Kölner Stadtanzeiger, Kölnische Rundschau and Express are still in the company.

On October 1, 2020, the media group gave itself a new structure under company law. In this restructuring, DuMont wants to transform itself from a consortium into a group of companies. In the process, a separate advisory board was created for the Regional Media business unit. This includes shareholder and supervisory board chairwoman Isabella Neven DuMont, DuMont CEO Christoph Bauer, and CFO Stefan Hütwohl; in addition, since 2021, media managers Britta Weddeling (Marvel Fusion) and Katja Nettesheim (Mediate and Culcha).

In October 2023 the company closed its own printing company in cologen und fired all employees without an post information or the participation of the workers council. In February 2024, the trade union ver.di therefore filed a complaint against the managing directors of DuMont Druck Köln Verwaltungs- und Beteiligungs GmbH.

== Newspapers and magazines ==
Newspaper and magazines published by M. DuMont Schauberg:

- Berliner Kurier (circulation 2010: 123,010, ownership: 65%)
- Berliner Zeitung (till 2020)
- Express (circulation 2015: 132,836 ownership: 100%)
- Frankfurter Rundschau (circulation 2008: 152,500, ownership: 50.1%)
- General-Anzeiger (circulation 2008: 82,176, ownership: 18%)
- Hamburger Morgenpost (till 2020)
- Kölner Stadt-Anzeiger (circulation 2010: 337,390 incl. Kölnische Rundschau, ownership: 100%)
- Kölnische Rundschau
- Live! (circulation ca. 50.000)
- Mitteldeutsche Zeitung (till 2019)
- Naumburger Tageblatt (circulation 2008: 14,450, ownership: 24.9%)
- Netzeitung (in German)

== Radio ==
- Berliner Rundfunk 91.4 (42,9 %)
- Radio NRW (6,6%)
- Radio Köln (75%)
- Radio Berg (80%)
- Radio Bonn / Rhein-Sieg (50%)
- Radio Euskirchen
- Radio Leverkusen
- Radio Rur

== See also ==
- Haaretz
- Bertelsmann
- Cologne
