= Rosa Bodenheimer =

German women's rights activist

Rosa Bodenheimer (born December 6, 1876, in Büren; died March 24, 1938, in Jerusalem) was a German women's rights activist.

== Biography ==
Bodenheimer was born in Büren, Westphalia, Germany. Like most Jewish women's rights activists, Rosa Dalberg came from a family of the Jewish assimilated bourgeoisie. Striving for recognition, Jewish girls were often obliged to adhere to bourgeois norms even more than non-Jewish girls and were generally not allowed to take up a profession, which is why many became involved in the bourgeois women's movement.

In 1896, Rosa Dalberg married the lawyer Max Bodenheimer from Cologne, a convinced Zionist. Bodenheimer later recalled their meeting: "I talked about Zionism, and Fräulein Dalberg turned out to be a women's rights activist. Both ideals sprang from the same feeling for justice and the same urge for freedom. The lively spirit, the interest in art, and her feeling for the oppressed attracted me powerfully." The couple had three children in quick succession, her son Friedrich Simon Bodenheimer in 1897 and daughters Hanna-Henriettein 1898 and Ruth in 1900. In 1931, the family lived at Belfortstraße 9; father Max and daughter Ruth had a joint law office in the house at Hohenzollernring 74.

After the births of her children, Rosa Bodenheimer began to become involved in the Cologne women's movement and became one of its most prominent representatives. Admittedly, she mainly felt more German than "Jewish": "She wanted to implement her ideas of social reform and political and social equality for women for all women." On the other hand, she was confronted with growing anti-Semitism in Germany, so that after the 1907 Zionist Congress in The Hague, at a time when many Jewish women still rejected Zionism, she initiated the founding of the Association of Jewish Women for Cultural Work in Palestine, forerunner of the Women's International Zionist Organization (WIZO).

In 1903, Rosa Bodenheimer, together with Elisabeth von Mumm and Adele Meurer, founded the Cologne chapter of the Allgemeiner Deutscher Frauenverein (ADF), becoming secretary in 1911, second chairwoman in 1923 and first chairwoman from 1927 to 1933. The work of the ADF differed fundamentally from the charitable work of earlier associations in the 19th century: "Social activity has become a civic aid activity that ultimately searches for the causes of misery and wants to eliminate these causes.“

After Rosa Bodenheimer heard a lecture by Marie Stritt, chairwoman of the Federation of German Women's Associations, in 1907, she participated in the founding of a Cologne suffrage group that same year. The Women's Suffrage Association for Germany was initially limited to preparing women for politics; Bodenheimer, meanwhile, called for a major advertising campaign for women's suffrage in 1912, with which she was unable to prevail.

During World War I, Bodenheimer was a board member of the National Women's Movement. She received a Cross of Merit for this commitment to war relief. In 1922, together with Adele Meurer, she founded Das Lädchen in Cologne, a sales agency for the impoverished due to war and inflation.

After the Nazis came to power in Germany in 1933, the Bodenheimer family fled to Palestine via Antwerp and Amsterdam in April. There Rosa Bodenheimer made contact with the women's suffrage movement and agitated against gender injustice in the Talmud. In 1938 she died after a short serious illness in Jerusalem.

== Literature ==
- Bodenheimer, Rosa, geb. Dalberg. J.B. Metzler. pp. 72–74.
- Ulrich S. Soénius (Hrsg.), Jürgen Wilhelm (Hrsg.): Kölner Personen-Lexikon. Greven, Köln 2007, ISBN 978-3-7743-0400-0, S. 63/64.
