= Frankfurter Rundschau =

German daily newspaper

- Type: Daily newspaper
- Format: Tabloid
- Owner(s): Zeitungsholding Hessen (90%); Karl-Gerold-Stiftung (10%)
- Editor: Thomas Kaspar
- Founded: 1 August 1945; 81 years ago
- Political alignment: Centre-left; Social liberalism Social democracy
- Language: de
- Headquarters: Frankfurt, Germany
- ISSN: 0940-6980
- Website: www.fr.de

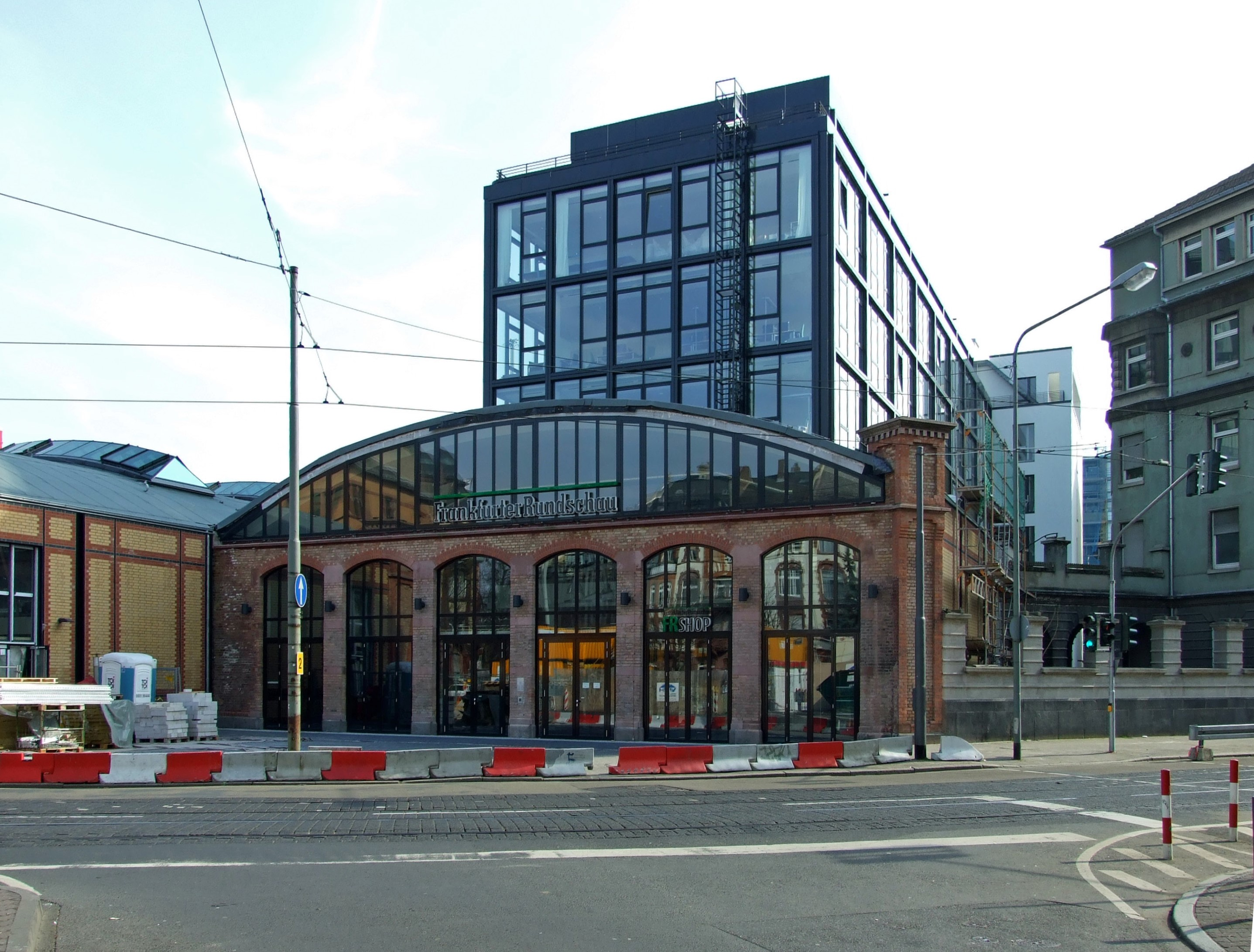
The new Rundschau-House

The Frankfurter Rundschau (FR) is a German daily newspaper, based in Frankfurt am Main. The Rundschau's editorial stance is social liberal. It holds that "independence, social justice and fairness" underlie its journalism. In Post-war Germany Frankfurter Rundschau was for decades a leading force of German press. The newspaper was one of the first licensed by the US military administration in 1945 and had a traditional social democratic, antifascist and trade union stand.

Starting with the decline of printed daily newspapers in the 2000s, the FR changed ownership several times, reduced its editorial team dramatically and today has little national significance. Frankfurter Rundschau Druck and Verlagshaus GmbH filed for bankruptcy on 12 November 2012. Then the paper was acquired by Frankfurter Allgemeine Zeitung and Frankfurter Societät (publisher of the Frankfurter Neue Presse) in 2013, by taking over just 28 full-time journalists. The FR editorial board continued to be bound by the legacy of Karl Gerold and the commitment to a "left-liberal" political line, and was integrated in the national and international editorial and correspondents network of the DuMont Mediengruppe, the former majority owners. The private foundation managing Karl Gerold's legacy still owns 10% of the shares. But all commercial activity of the paper, printing, selling advertisement and distribution was put in the hands of the Frankfurter Societät. The FR printing enterprise was closed. The contracts for printing BILD-Zeitung and other papers went from the FR's printshop to the FAZ's Societätsdruckerei.

On 1 April 2018, the Frankfurter Societät's ninety per-cent share was sold to Zeitungsholding Hessen, an investment vehicle of the publisher Dirk Ippen. In October 2021, Ippen blocked the publication by the Franfurter Rundschau of an investigative report on accusations of abuse of power made against former Bild editor, Julian Reichelt.

== History and profile ==
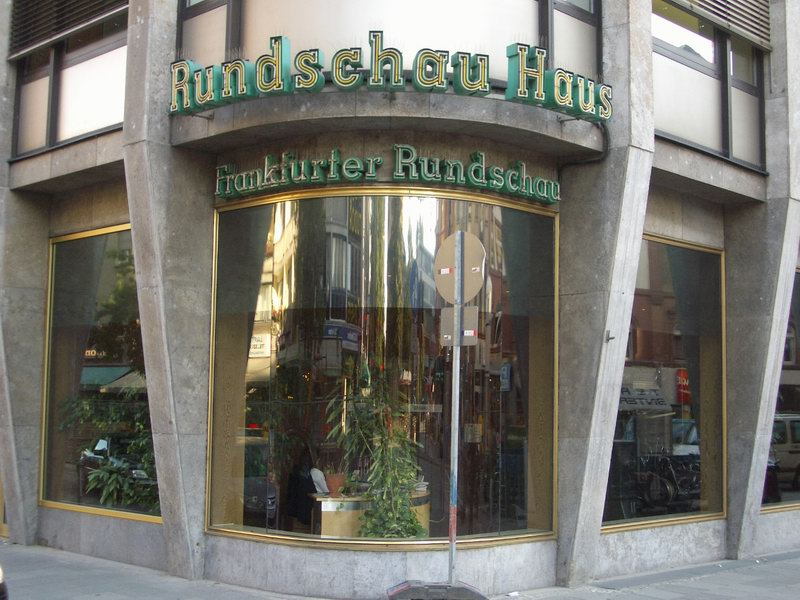
The former Rundschau-Haus at the Eschenheimer Tor

The Rundschau published its first issue on 1 August 1945 shortly after the end of World War II in Europe. It was the first newspaper published in the US sector in occupied Germany and the third newspaper in post-war Germany. The licence was handed over to the first team of editors consisting of Emil Carlebach, Hans Etzkorn, Wilhelm Karl Gerst, Otto Grossmann, Wilhelm Knothe, Paul Rodemann and Arno Rudert, a progressive think-tank of social democrats, political Catholics and communists, who had spent years in the resistance and Nazi concentration camps or in exile. With the coming of the Cold War, the American occupation authority forced all communist members of the editorial team to leave the paper two years later. In 1949 only Arno Rudert and Karl Gerold were left from the founding team. Gerold left SPD in the same year, to demonstrate his political independence.

Research by the Rundschau in the 1960s revealed, among other things, initiated the Auschwitz trials in Germany. At the end of the 1960s, the Frankfurter Rundschau uncovered the so-called HS-30 scandal. The German government only procured the HS-30 armored personnel carrier for the Bundeswehr because bribes had been paid to several responsible persons and illegal payments had been made to the CDU.

On 30 May 2007 the Rundschau changed its format to the award-winning smaller tabloid size.

The paper was awarded the European Newspaper of the Year in the category of judges' special recognition by the European Newspaper Congress in 2011.

In the 2013 elections the magazine was among the supporters of the Social Democratic Party (SPD).

The 1993 circulation of the paper was 189,000 copies. In the first quarter of 2015, the newspaper boasted a circulation of around 70,000 copies.

In 2019, the newspaper published an editorial titled "The Eternal Netanyahu" about Prime Minister of Israel Benjamin Netanyahu. The name evoked a Nazi Germany film titled The Eternal Jew. Ulf Poschardt, editor-in-chief of German newspaper Die Welt, tweeted a condemnation of the Frankfurter Rundschau, as did a top journalist for German newspaper Bild. The Frankfurter Rundschau claimed that the association was accidental.

=== Restructuring ===
In 2003, the paper had financial difficulties and was supported by a guarantee from the federal state of Hesse. In May 2004 the Deutsche Druck- und Verlagsgesellschaft (DDVG), owned by the SPD, acquired 90 percent of the shares of the Druck- und Verlagshaus Frankfurt am Main (DuV), the publisher of the FR until then. The social democrats emphasized that they wanted to assure the future of one of the few left-liberal daily newspapers in Germany and asserted they would not exert influence on the articles. The social democrats also announced that they wanted to reduce their share to under 50 percent until 2006. In order to save the paper from insolvency, the DDVG soon drastically cut back expenditures. By means of dismissals and outsourcing, the number of employees shrank within the last three years from 1700 to 750.

Amid speculation on DDVG's complaints about too friendly articles on the new left party Die Linke and its plan to sell the majority of its shares (see article in the newspaper Junge Welt from 30 August 2007) Wolfgang Storz's term as editor-in-chief ended abruptly on 16 May 2006. The appointed next editor-in-chief was Uwe Vorkötter (effective 1 July 2006). Only a few days later, on 18 July 2007, the DDVG announced that it would sell 50 percent plus one share to the independent publishing company M. DuMont Schauberg based in Cologne, Germany. Today, DuMont Schauberg holds 50 percent plus one share, the DDVG owns 40 percent and the Karl-Gerold-Foundation holds 10 percent of the newspaper.

=== Takeover by the families Ippen and Rempel ===
The Frankfurter Rundschau and local newspaper Frankfurter Neue Presse were taken over by the Newspaper Holding Hessen, ZHH in spring 2018. The ZHH is majority owned by the Ippen publishing group and the MDV media group of the Giessen publishing family Rempel ("Gießener Allgemeine").

In the summer of 2023, the newspaper's employees will contact Ippen. In an open letter they wrote: "As a left-liberal newspaper, we stand up for justice in our articles. We report on wage inequality, labor disputes, gender equality and social politics." However, there is "enormous injustice in the pay of editorial members". In December 2023, a conflict over uniform pay for FR employees escalated. FR employees have been demanding a collective agreement for months, but management wanted to avoid it. Negotiations with the ver.di and DJV unions were broken off without result. Ippen increased the editor's salary across the board and viewed this as an enormous concession. Nevertheless, the publisher remained well below the collective agreement for daily newspapers.

The employees went on strike. Shortly afterwards, the managing director Max Rempel fired three employed editors and officially justified this by discontinuing the newspaper's unprofitable additional products.

== Literature ==
- Emil Carlebach: "Zensur ohne Schere, Die Gründerjahre der 'Frankfurter Rundschau' 1945/47" (lit. 'Censorship without scissors, The founding years of the 'Frankfurter Rundschau' 1945/47'. Frankfurt 1985, ISBN 3-87682-807-4
- Wolf Gunter Brügmann : "1968 – 2008. Vom Aufstieg und Niedergang der Frankfurter Rundschau" (lit. '1968 – 2008: The rise and fall of the Frankfurter Rundschau')

== Sources ==
- European Newspaper Award 2007

German links

- Report in the German magazine Spiegel from 18 July 2006
- Report in the newspaper Junge Welt from 13 May 2008
