= General-Anzeiger =

Daily newspaper published in Bonn, Germany

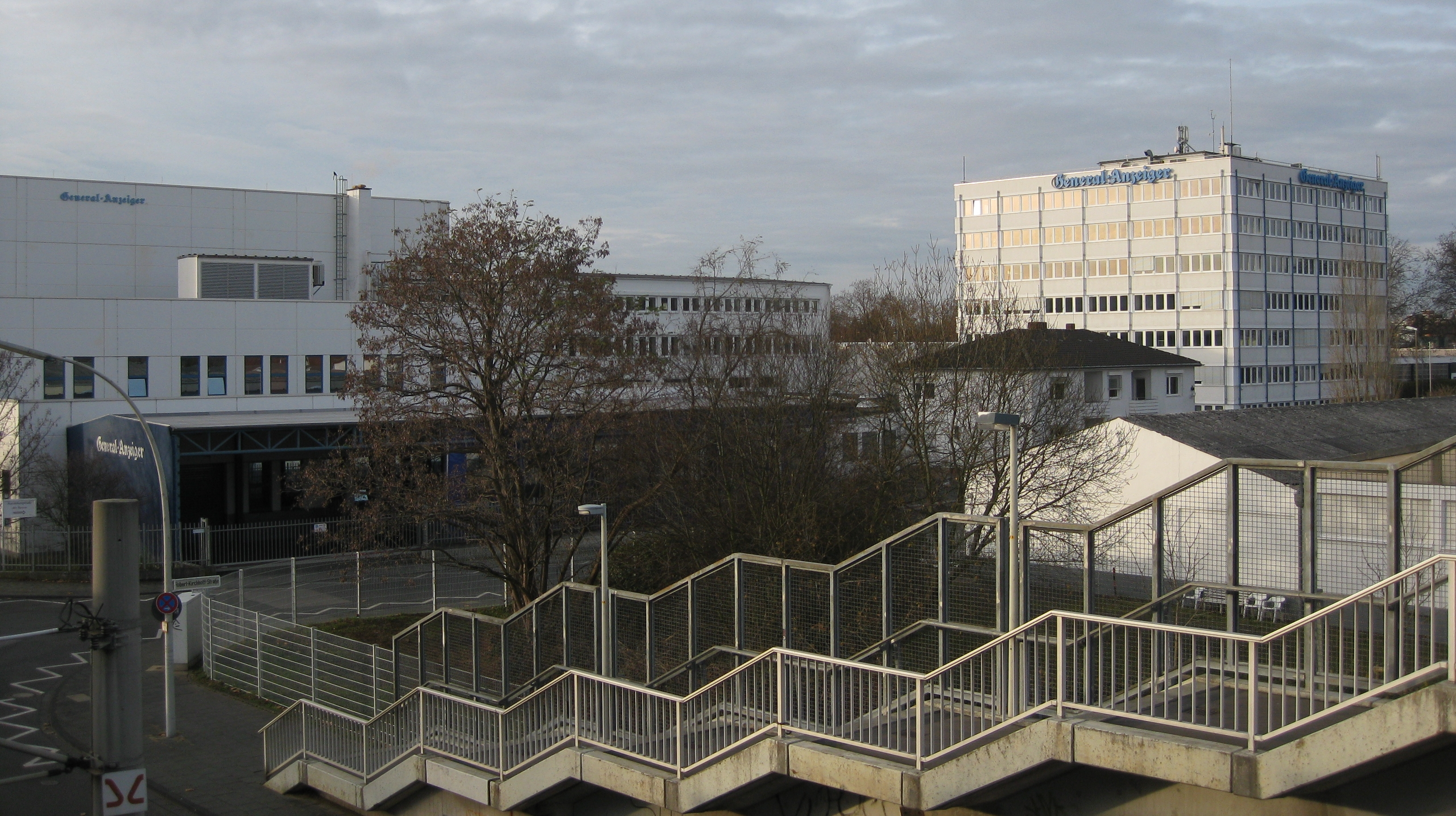
Company site in Bonn

The General-Anzeiger is a regional daily newspaper based in the city of Bonn, the former West German capital in the federal state of North Rhine-Westphalia, Germany. The paper was first published in April 1888. In addition to the city and its surroundings, the distribution of the newspaper and its local editions extends to the neighboring districts of Rhein-Sieg, Ahrweiler and Neuwied. It is published daily, except Sundays. In the fourth quarter of 2020, the General-Anzeiger recorded average daily circulation figures of 58,837.
