= Kölner Stadt-Anzeiger =

Daily newspaper in Cologne, Germany

- Sample front page
- Type: Daily newspaper
- Format: Berliner
- Founder: Marcus DuMont
- Publisher: M. DuMont Schauberg
- Editor-in-chief: Peter Pauls (2009-2016); Carsten Fiedler (2017–2023)
- Founded: 1876
- Headquarters: Cologne, Germany
- Circulation: 336,077
- Sister newspapers: Kölnische Rundschau
- OCLC number: 224741931
- Website: www.ksta.de

Leverkusener Anzeiger, a spin-off of the Kölner Stadt-Anzeiger

The Kölner Stadt-Anzeiger (KStA) is a German daily newspaper published in Cologne, and has the largest circulation in the Cologne–Bonn Metropolitan Region. Kölner Stadt-Anzeiger has a base of over 100 contributing editors and a wide network of correspondents for local and regional news reporting.

== History ==
The Kölner Stadt-Anzeiger first appeared in 1876 as a local equivalent of the national Kölnische Zeitung (Cologne Gazette). Toward the end of World War II, both newspapers had to cease publication.

In October 1949 the Cologne Stadt-Anzeiger published again. Under fierce competition, it developed by the late 1950s into the leading newspaper of the Cologne region. Since 1960, Professor Alfred Neven DuMont of M. DuMont Schauberg has been the sole editor of the newspaper. Since 2004, Konstantin Neven DuMont has been its managing director. Chief editor of the paper is Peter Pauls.

Writers have included:

- Karl Andree, 1843–1846
- Mathilde Franziska Anneke
- Karl Heinrich Brüggemann, editor-in-chief 1846 bis 1854, author of book Meine Leitung der Kölnischen Zeitung 1846–1855, Leipzig 1855.
- Otto Brües, Feuilletonredakteur und -leiter (since 1934)
- August Dresbach
- Karl Färber, correspondent from 1943 to 1945
- Eugen Feihl, correspondent in Paris from 1924 to 1934
- Gerhard F. Hering, feuilleton editor from 1937 to 1941
- Karl Heinrich Hermes
- Hermann Joseph Klein
- Fifi Kreutzer, illustrationen and landscape articles (1931–1934)
- Heinrich Kruse
- Karl Mathy
- Wilhelm Mohr
- Herbert Nette, feuilleton
- Leonore Niessen-Deiters
- Johann Jacob Nöggerath, prof. for mineralogy, author from 1824 to around 1860
- Hermann Püttmann, feuilleton from 1842 to 1844
- Friedrich Ratzel
- Detmar Heinrich Sarnetzki, 1903–1943
- August Schleicher, correspondent
- Friedrich Schrader, correspondent in Konstantinopel until 1918
- Levin Schücking, feuilleton 1845 to 1852
- Wilhelm Smets, feuilleton from 1837 to 1841
- Luise Straus-Ernst
- Hans Wachenhusen, war correspondent during German-French War 1870/71
- Ferdinand Franz Wallraf, art collector
- Hugo Zöller, correspondent

== Editors-in-chief ==
- 1989–1993 Hans-Joachim Deckert
- 1993–1997 Dieter Jepsen-Föge
- 1997–1999 Martin E. Süskind
- 1999–2000 Thomas Meyer
- 2000–2009 Franz Sommerfeld
- 2009–2016 Peter Pauls
- 2017–2023 Carsten Fiedler

== See also ==
- List of newspapers in Germany
- Irene Meichsner
- Gerhard Fauth
