= Botanischer Garten Kaiserberg =

Botanical garden in North Rhine-Westphalia, Germany

Coordinates: 51.4359°N 6.7972°E

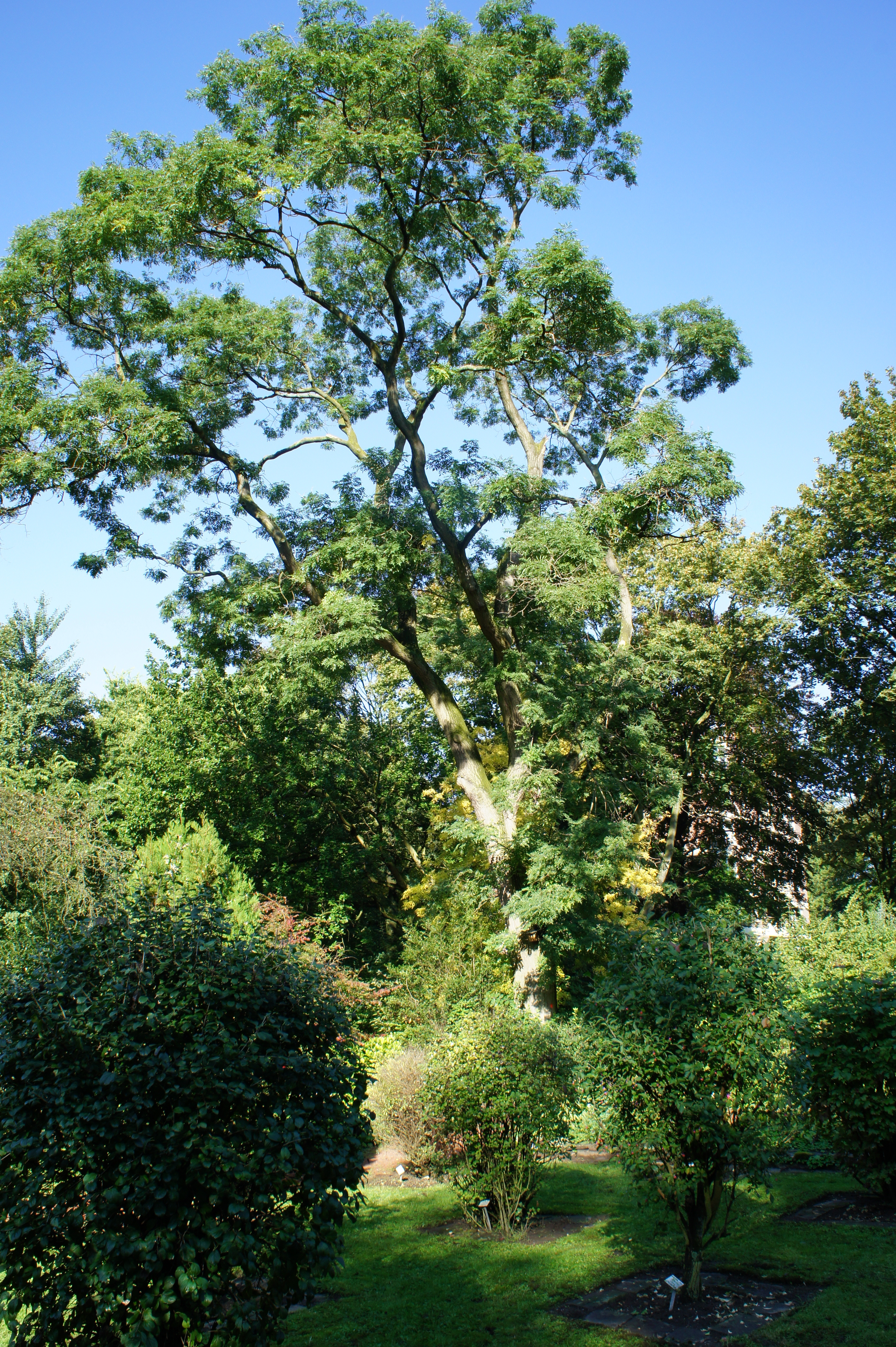
Botanischer Garten Kaiserberg

The Botanischer Garten Kaiserberg (2 hectares) is a botanical garden located at Schweizer Straße 24, Duisburg, North Rhine-Westphalia, Germany. The garden was established in 1890 and primarily cultivates native plants, but also includes exotic flora such as Araucaria, Ginkgo biloba, Sequoiadendron. It is open daily without charge, and should not be confused with the Botanischer Garten Duisburg-Hamborn, another botanical garden in Duisburg.

== See also ==
- Botanischer Garten Duisburg-Hamborn
- List of botanical gardens in Germany
