= Botanischer Garten Duisburg-Hamborn =

Coordinates: 51.4869°N 6.7665°E

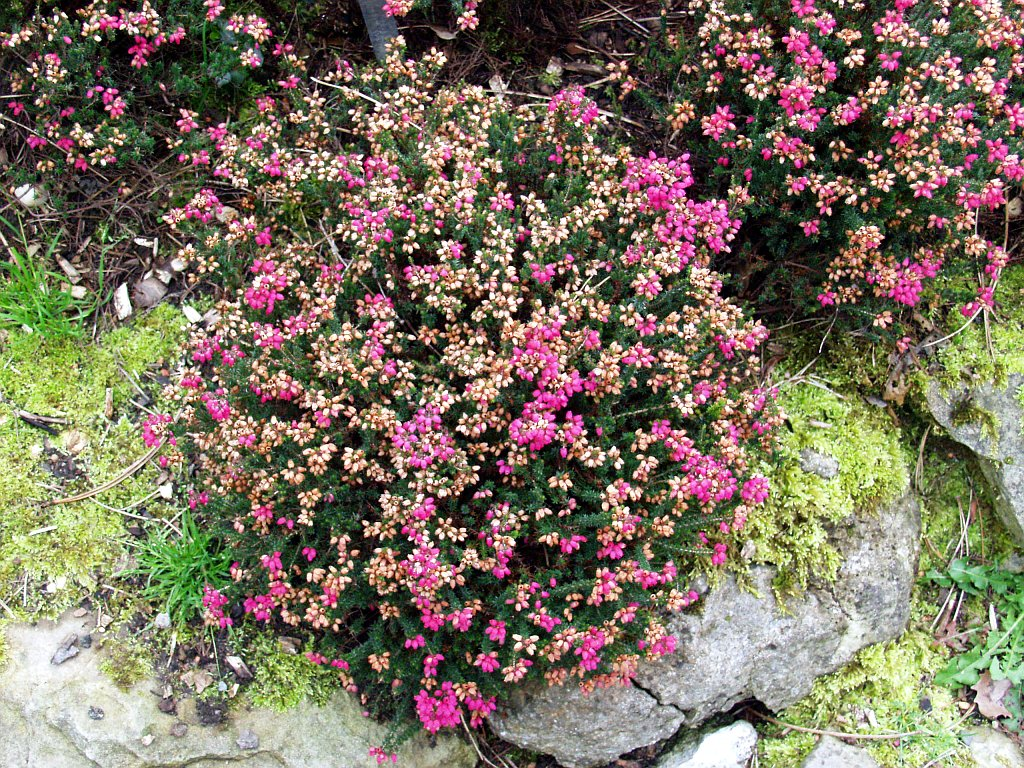
- Botanischer Garten Duisburg-Hamborn
- Interactive map of Botanischer Garten Duisburg-Hamborn
- Location: Fürst-Pückler-Straße 18, Duisburg, North Rhine-Westphalia, Germany
- No. of species: 1000
- Website: https://www.wb-duisburg.de/Privat/Privat_Gruen/botanischer-garten-hamborn.php

The Botanischer Garten Duisburg-Hamborn, also known as the Botanischer Garten Duisburg or the Botanischer Garten Hamborn, is a municipal botanical garden and aquarium located at Fürst-Pückler-Straße 18, Duisburg, North Rhine-Westphalia, Germany. It is open daily, and should not be confused with the Botanischer Garten Kaiserberg, another botanical garden in Duisburg.

The garden hosts about 1,000 species outdoors and in greenhouses. Major features of the garden include a landscape park, rhododendrons, fuchsia and primula collections, aromatic and medicinal plants, and ferns. The garden has also a lily pond, tropical greenhouse, subtropical greenhouse, and greenhouse containing about 800 cacti and succulents, as well as an aquarium.

According to local newspaper WAZ in March 2010 it had been on a list of community facilities together with public baths, that would be closed subsequently, since funding was no longer lawful as of Art. 81 in German Haushaltsrecht. The mayoral council of Duisburg decided against these plans – though without having found a proper way of funding that would and could find approval by superior Bezirksregierung Düsseldorf, which controls the city's funds.

== See also ==
- Botanischer Garten Kaiserberg
- List of botanical gardens in Germany
