= Stefan Berger (politician) =

German economist and politician of the Christian Democratic Union (born 1969)

Stefan Berger MEP
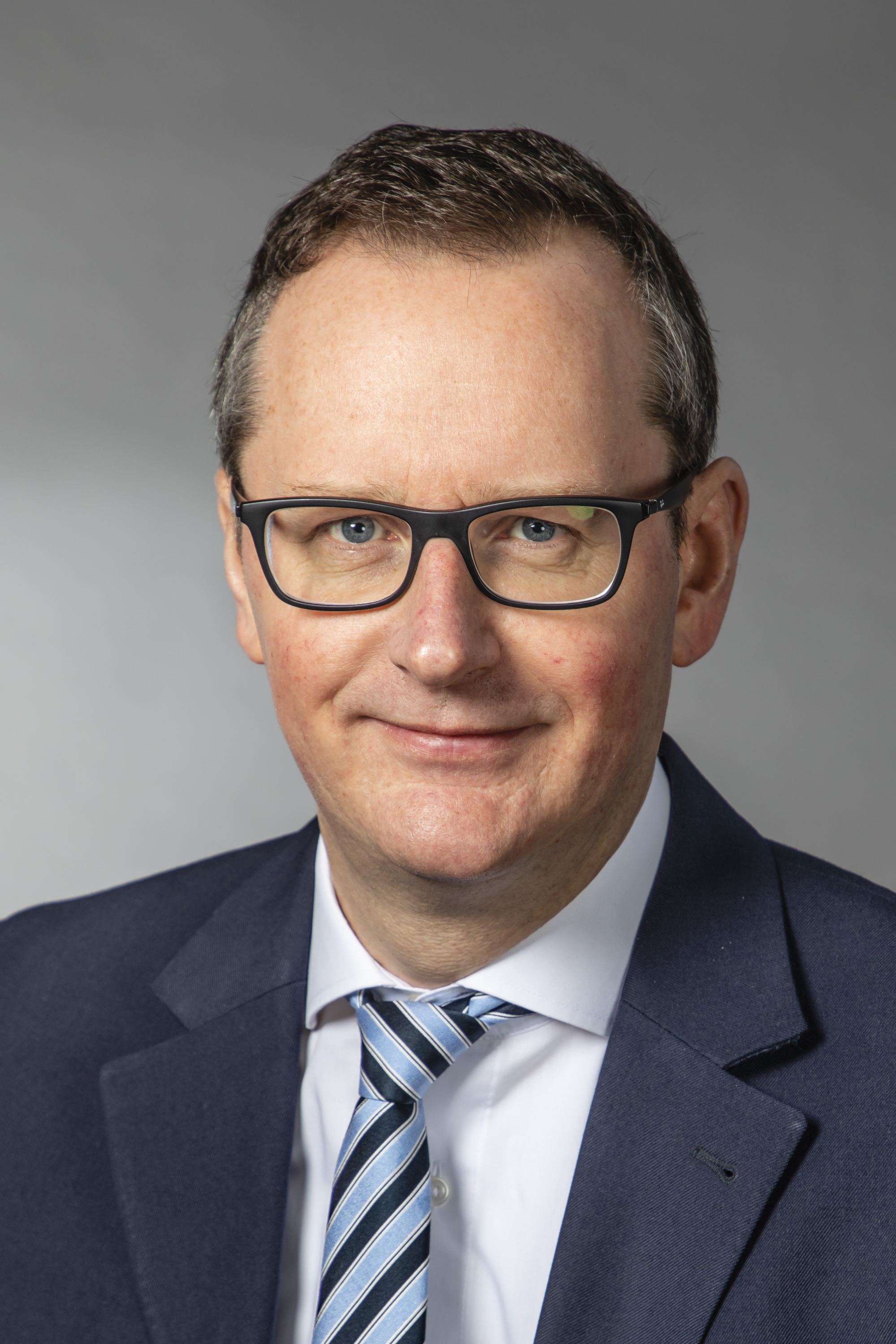

Member of the European Parliament for Germany

Personal details
- Born: 15 September 1969 (age 56) Mönchengladbach, West Germany (now Germany)
- Party: German: Christian Democratic Union; EU: European People's Party

Stefan Heinrich Berger (born 15 September 1969) is a German economist and politician of the Christian Democratic Union (CDU) who has been serving as a member of the European Parliament since 2019. He is part of the group of the European People's Party (Christian Democrats). Previously, he was a member of the State Parliament of North Rhine-Westphalia.

== Education and personal life ==
Berger was born in Langenfeld. He received his high school diploma at the Gymnasium St. Wolfhelm (Schwalmtal) in 1989 and studied economics at the Johannes Gutenberg University of Mainz from 1989 to 1995. He graduated in 1995 with a diploma as a business teacher (Handelslehrer) and in 1997, he also passed the Second State Examination.

Berger carried out his legal clerkship at the Studienseminar in Düsseldorf. He then worked for an enterprise in advanced education services and received his doctorate in 1999. He lectures on international economic and monetary policy at the FOM University of Applied Sciences (FOM) and the International School Of Management (ISM). Berger is married and has one daughter.

== Municipal/communal politics ==
Berger has been a member of the Christian Democratic Union (CDU) since 1995 and chairman of the CDU Schwalmtal since 1999. Since 2000, he has been a member of the executive board of the CDU Niederrhein, and since 2009 deputy chairman of the CDU of the county district Viersen. In addition, he is deputy chairman of CDU Mittelstands- und Wirtschaftsvereinigung (MIT) North Rhine-Westphalia. From 1999 to 2009, he was a councillor of the Schwalmtal municipality. From 2001 to 2004, he was a member of the district council of the district of Viersen.

== Regional politics ==
Berger was a member of the State Parliament of North Rhine-Westphalia from 2 June 2000 to 3 July 2019. He was directly elected in 2000, 2005, 2010, 2012 and 2017 in the electoral district of Viersen I. In parliament, he was his parliamentary group's spokesperson on universities. During the term of office of Cabinet Kraft II, he was the CDU’s parliamentary counterpart to Minister of Science Svenja Schulze.

In 2010, Berger was a voting member of the Federal Assembly. From 2014 to 2017, he was also a member of the CDU Federal Committee for Education, Research and Innovation. From 2006 to 2008 and from 2010 to 2012, he was a full member of the Congress of Local and Regional Authorities of the Council of Europe.

== European policy ==
In January 2018, the district executive committee and district conference of the CDU district of Viersen nominated Berger as a candidate for the 2019 European elections, as Karl-Heinz Florenz, then MEP for the Lower Rhine region, did not run again for this election due to his age. In June 2018, he was elected as a candidate for the European Parliament by the CDU Niederrhein. In a secret ballot for the recommendation for sixth place on the list, the state executive of the CDU NRW nominated Stefan Berger at the beginning of 2019 in place of the European politician Elmar Brok. This led to a strong response from several media outlets. On 26 January 2019 the NRW CDU's state representatives' meeting confirmed Berger's sixth place on the North Rhine-Westphalian electoral list for the European elections on 26 May 2019, which is considered to be a likely position from which to enter the European Parliament.

After all the votes cast in the 2019 European elections had been counted, Berger's entry into the European Parliament was officially confirmed on 27 May 2019. Berger is member of the Committee on Economic and Monetary Affairs (ECON) and of the Delegation for relations with Japan. He is an alternate member of the Committee on Employment and Social Affairs (EMPL), the Committee on the Environment, Public Health and Food Safety (ENVI) and the Delegation for bilateral relations with the Arab Peninsula. His seat neighbor in the European Parliament is Silvio Berlusconi.

On the European level, Berger stands up for medium-sized businesses (SMEs) by being an active in the Parliamentary Circle for medium-sized Businesses Europe as well as in the SME-Circle of the EPP Group. Berger is part of the Federal Expert Committee on European Policy (Bundesfachausschuss Europapolitik) of the CDU/CSU.

=== Positions and demands ===
==== Digital currency Diem ====
In the course of the planned launch of Facebook's digital currency Diem (formerly called Libra), Stefan Berger calls for the rapid development of a European stable coin, which could serve as a secure and stable alternative to Facebook's introduced currency. Berger regards the power of the "Libra society" as a threat to the stability of the Eurozone and a threat to European democracy. He warns that Diem should not convert Zuckerberg into central bank, argues that it is time for Europe to gather expert knowledge on Diem and to carry out a detailed impact assessment of the financial system.

Berger will be in charge of the European report of Markets in Crypto-Assets (MiCA) which will serve as base for a regulatory framework for crypto-assets.

Presidency of the EU Commission

Given the withdrawal of Manfred Weber as candidate for the office of EU Commission President, Berger welcomed the nomination of Ursula von der Leyen as an alternative candidate. He described a possible failure of her election and the associated further search for candidates as a "journey to Jerusalem (musical chairs), but without chairs".

== List of publications ==
- Berger, S. (2019). Zuckerberg darf nicht zur Zentralbank werden. Frankfurter Allgemeine Zeitung
- Berger, Stefan (27 March 2020). "Gastbeitrag: "Wir brauchen freiwillige Datenspenden"". RP ONLINE (in German).
- "Zuckerbergs Zentralbank?". Die Politische Meinung (in German). 27 February 2020.
- Berger, Stefan (8 December 2020). "EU must embrace technologies and improve the efficiency of the financial system". The Parliament Magazine.
- Berger, Stefan (17 February 2021). "The EU must provide regulation and innovation to the crypto asset industry". Brussels Morning Newspaper.

== Voluntary commitment ==
In addition to his parliamentary work, he was member the advisory board of the Society for Employment Promotion of the district of Viersen and on the advisory board of the Willich I prison. He is also vice president of the Arbeiter-Samariter-Bund Nordrhein-Westfalen. From 2005 to 2012, Berger was a member of the Board of Trustees of the Heinrich Hertz Foundation.
