= Thomas Kutschaty =

German politician (born 1968)

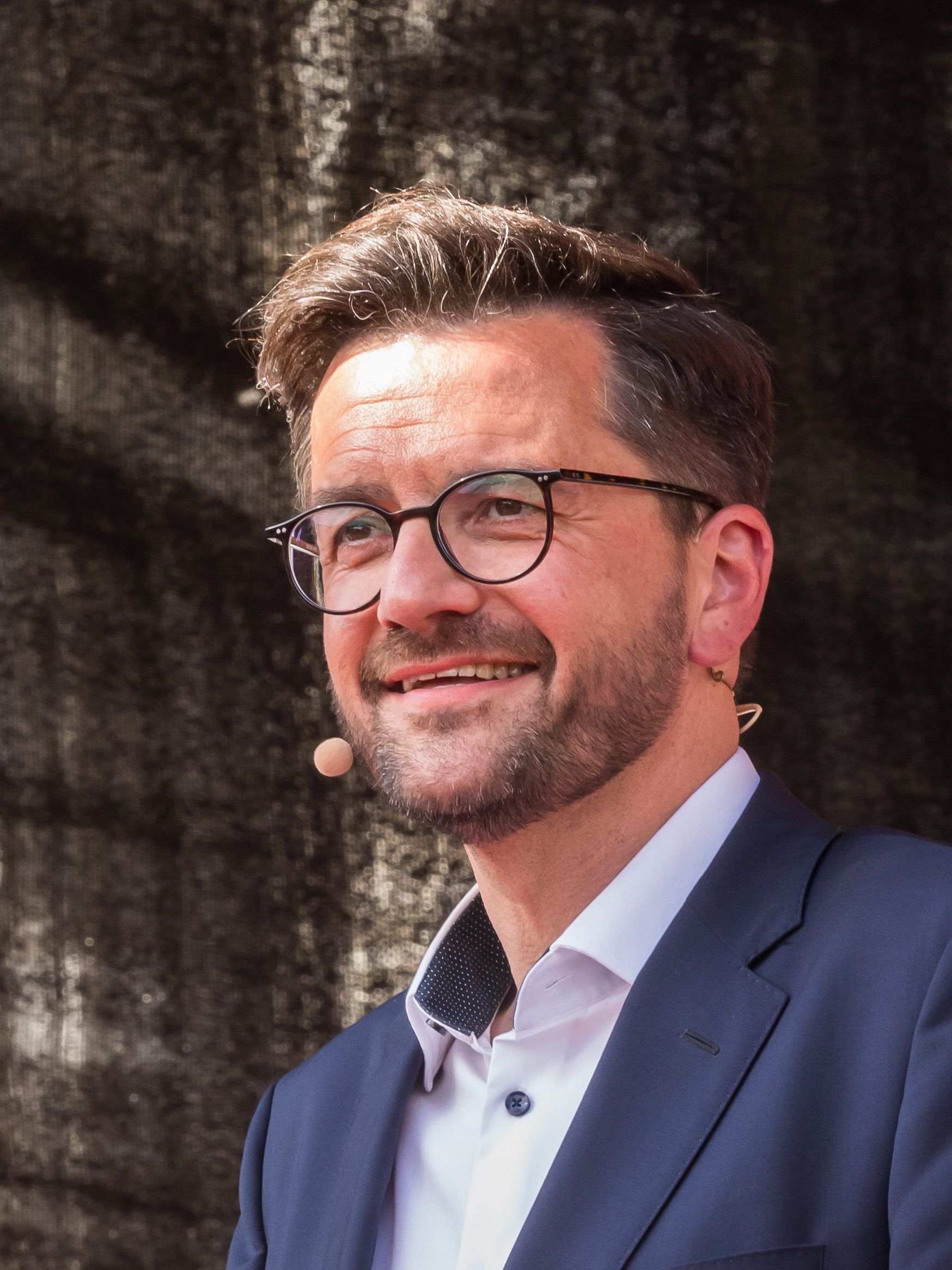
- Kutschaty in 2022

Leader of the Social Democratic Party in North Rhine-Westphalia
- Incumbent
- Assumed office 6 March 2021
- Deputy: Marc Herter; Elvan Korkmaz; Veith Lemmen; Sören Link; Dörte Schall
- Preceded by: Sebastian Hartmann

Leader of the Social Democratic Party in the Landtag of North Rhine-Westphalia
- Incumbent
- Assumed office 27 April 2018
- Chief Whip: Sarah Philipp
- Preceded by: Norbert Römer

Minister of Justice of North Rhine-Westphalia
- In office 15 July 2010 – 27 June 2017
- Minister President: Hannelore Kraft
- Preceded by: Roswitha Müller-Piepenkötter
- Succeeded by: Peter Biesenbach

Member of the Landtag of North Rhine-Westphalia for Essen I – Mülheim II
- Incumbent
- Assumed office 8 June 2005
- Preceded by: Constituency created

Personal details
- Born: Thomas Kutschaty; 12 June 1968 (age 58) Essen, West Germany (now Germany)
- Party: Social Democratic Party
- Education: Ruhr University Bochum

Thomas Kutschaty (born 12 June 1968) is a German politician of the Social Democratic Party (SPD) who served as the leader of the SPD in North Rhine-Westphalia from 2021 to 2023.

Kutschaty has been a member of the State Parliament of North Rhine-Westphalia since 2005 and the parliamentary leader of the SPD since 2018. Prior to this, Kutschaty served as the State Minister for Justice of North Rhine-Westphalia from 2010 till 2017.

== Early life, education and family ==
Kutschaty was born in Essen, West Germany in June 1968. His family was railway workers' family, with Kutschaty being the first to complete his Abitur. Kutschaty studied law at the Ruhr University Bochum, passing his first state exam in 1995 and his second in 1997. Kutschaty was active as a lawyer between 1997 and 2010.

Kutschaty is married and has three children.

== Political career ==
=== Career in local politics ===
Kutschaty has been a member of the SPD since 1986. Between 1987 and 1989, he served as the Spokesperson of the Young Socialists in Essen-Borbeck, and between 1998 and 1990, he was member of the executive of the Young Socialists in Essen. Additionally Kutschaty has been a member of the executive of the SPD Essen-Borbeck, and served as its leader since 1994. In 1999, he was elected to the Essen city council, where he served in the committee on urban development and city planning until 2004.

=== Career in state politics ===
Kutschaty was elected to the State Parliament of North Rhine-Westfalia in the 2005 elections. In parliament, he was a member of the internal affairs committee as well as the justice committee and the parliamentary oversight committee. He also served as the deputy chair of the committee investigating the prison JVA Siegburg.

After Hannelore Kraft (SPD) formed a minority government following the 2010 state election, she appointed Kutschaty as justice minister, an office which was reappointed to after the 2012 state election. He left government after the Hannelore Kraft and the SPD lost the 2017 state election against Armin Laschet and the Christian Democrats. Kutschaty was succeeded as justice minister by Peter Biesenbach (CDU).

Kutschaty was nominated by his party as delegate to the Federal Convention for the purpose of electing the President of Germany in 2022.

Kutschaty was the lead candidate for the Social Democrats in the 2022 North Rhine-Westfalia state election but lost out against incumbent Minister-President Hendrik Wüst.

Since January 2023, Kutschaty has been serving on an internal SPD commission on tax reform, co-chaired by Saskia Esken and Lars Klingbeil.

== Other activities ==
=== Corporate boards ===
- NRW.BANK, Member of the Supervisory Board
- Sparkasse Essen, Member of the Supervisory Board (2017–2021)

=== Non-profit organizations ===
- German War Graves Commission, Member
