= Svenja Schulze =

German politician (born 1968)

Svenja Schulze MdB
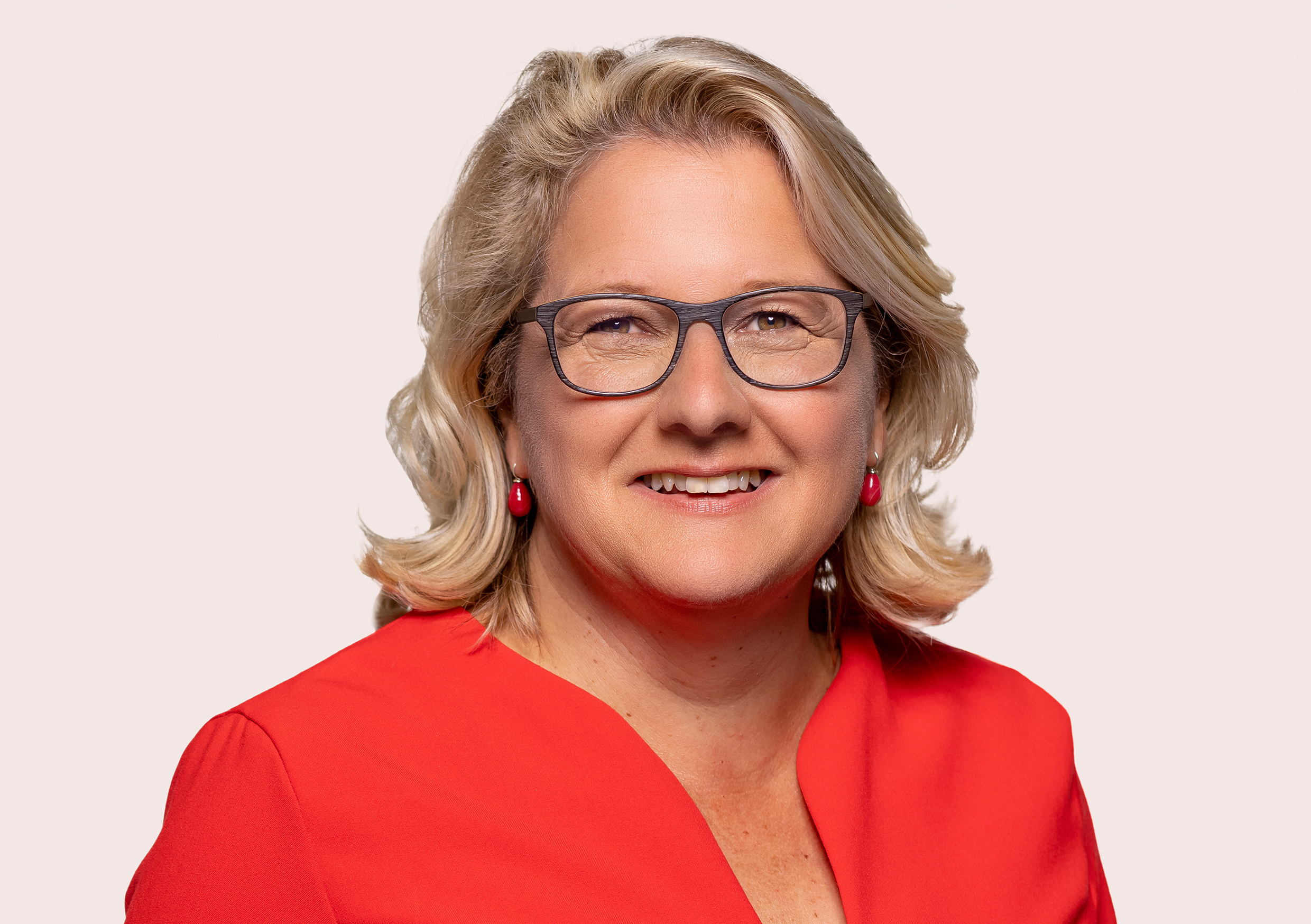
- Official portrait, 2021

Minister for Economic Cooperation and Development
- In office 8 December 2021 – 6 May 2025
- Chancellor: Olaf Scholz
- Preceded by: Gerd Müller
- Succeeded by: Reem Alabali-Radovan

Minister for the Environment, Nature Conservation and Nuclear Safety
- In office 14 March 2018 – 8 December 2021
- Chancellor: Angela Merkel
- Preceded by: Barbara Hendricks
- Succeeded by: Steffi Lemke

Minister for the Innovation, Science and Research of North Rhine-Westphalia
- In office 15 July 2010 – 27 June 2017
- Minister-President: Hannelore Kraft
- Preceded by: Andreas Pinkwart (Innovation, Science, Research and Technology)
- Succeeded by: Andreas Pinkwart (Economics, Innovation, Digitization, and Energy)

General Secretary of the SPD North Rhine-Westphalia
- In office June 2017 – March 2018
- Preceded by: André Stinka
- Succeeded by: Nadja Lüders

Member of the German Bundestag for North Rhine-Westphalia
- Incumbent
- Assumed office 26 October 2021
- Preceded by: multi-member district

Member of the Landtag of North Rhine-Westphalia
- In office 22 October 2004 – 16 March 2018
- Preceded by: Frank Baranowski
- Succeeded by: Inge Blask
- Constituency: Social Democratic List (2004–2012; 2017–2018); Münster II (2012–2017)
- In office 3 June 1997 – 1 June 2000
- Preceded by: Stefan Frechen
- Constituency: Social Democratic List

Personal details
- Born: 29 September 1968 (age 58) Düsseldorf, West Germany
- Party: Social Democratic Party
- Education: Ruhr-Universität Bochum

Svenja Schulze (born 29 September 1968) is a German politician of the Social Democratic Party (SPD) who has been serving as member of the German Bundestag since 2021, representing North Rhine-Westphalia.

On the national level, Schulze served as Minister for Economic Cooperation and Development in the cabinet of Olaf Scholz from 2021 to 2025 and as Minister for the Environment, Nature Conservation and Nuclear Safety in the fourth coalition government of Chancellor Angela Merkel from 2018 to 2021. From 15 July 2010 to 30 June 2017, she was Minister for Innovation, Science and Research in the state government of North Rhine-Westphalia.

== Early life and career ==
Schulze was born in Düsseldorf and grew up in the Weckhoven district of Neuss. She completed her school-leaving exam in 1988 at the Gymnasium Norf in Neuss. She then studied German Studies and Political Science at Ruhr-Universität Bochum, which she completed in 1996 with the academic degree of Magistra Artium. As part of her studies, she also completed an internship at Alice-Salomon-Berufskolleg, a vocational school in Bochum.

After graduating, Schulze worked as a freelancer in the advertising and PR industry. From 2000, she worked as a management consultant specializing in the public sector, including at Mummert & Partner, BBDO and Booz & Company.

== Political career ==
=== Career in state politics ===
Schulze joined the SPD in 1988 and served as highschool students' county spokesperson for North Rhine-Westphalia from 1988 to 1989, then as a member of the Socialist College Association and chair of the AStA at the University of Bochum. From 1993 to 1997, Schulze was North Rhine-Westphalia's regional leader of Jusos.

From 1996 to 2002 and again from 2006 to 2018, Schulze served on the leadership of the SPD in North Rhine-Westphalia.

From 3 June 1997 to 1 June 2000 and again from 22 October 2004, Schulze was a member of the State Parliament of North Rhine-Westphalia. She last moved in for Frank Baranowski, who had been elected Lead Mayor of Gelsenkirchen. In the 2005 and 2010 elections she was again elected to the state parliament. From 2005 until 2010, she served as her parliamentary group's spokesperson on environmental policy and consumer protection.

In 2007, Schulze took over the chairmanship of the SPD sub-district Münster from Christoph Strässer and held it until 21 May 2011.

After 2010 state elections, Minister-President Hannelore Kraft appointed Schulze as State Minister of Innovation, Science and Research of the State of North Rhine-Westphalia (Cabinet Kraft I). With the abolition of tuition fees in North Rhine-Westphalia, Schulze launched one of the government's major political projects. During her term, the so-called "nuclear sphere affair" regarding the AVR reactor in Jülich occurred. At the election on 13 May 2012, she won the direct mandate in the Münster II constituency and was directly elected to the state legislature with 40.1 percent. On 21 June 2012, she was appointed again as State Minister of Innovation, Science and Research in the Cabinet Kraft II.

From 2017 until 2018, Schulze served as Secretary General of the SPD North Rhine-Westphalia, in this capacity supporting interim chairman Michael Groschek. On 8 December 2017, she was elected to the SPD national board, under the leadership of chairwoman Andrea Nahles. On the following day she was also elected to the SPD Presidium.

=== Federal Minister of the Environment, 2018–2021 ===
In the negotiations to form a fourth coalition government under Chancellor Angela Merkel following the 2017 federal elections, Schulze was part of the working group on education policy, led by Annegret Kramp-Karrenbauer, Stefan Müller and Hubertus Heil. On 9 March 2018, she was nominated by the party executive committee of the SPD as Minister of the Environment, Nature Conservation and Nuclear Safety in the new government. When Germany held the rotating presidency of the Council of the European Union in 2020, she chaired the meetings of its Environment Council.

After SPD chairwoman Andrea Nahles resigned in 2019, Schulze declined to join the race to succeed her; instead Saskia Esken and Norbert Walter-Borjans became the party's co-chairs.

During her time in office, Schulze helped implement the Merkel government's 2019 agreement on the introduction of a carbon price for key sectors such as transport and a €54 billion spending package to encourage companies and households to reduce their carbon emissions. She later oversaw the introduction of 2021 legislation under which farmers in Germany would have to gradually reduce their use of glyphosate and stop using it completely from 2024 in order to preserve clean habitats for insects. Later that year, she led the government's efforts to raise Germany's target for reducing carbon emissions by 2030 from 55 per cent to 65 per cent and to achieve carbon neutrality by 2045, five years earlier than initially planned.

In October 2020, Schulze announced that she would run for a parliamentary seat in the 2021 federal elections. In the elections, she stood in Münster but came in third place. She was elected on the state list.

In the negotiations to form a so-called traffic light coalition of the SPD, the Green Party and the Free Democratic Party (FDP) following the elections, Schulze was part of her party's delegation in the working group on climate protection and energy policy, co-chaired by Matthias Miersch, Oliver Krischer and Lukas Köhler.

At the COP26 climate summit in 2021, Schulze said that "nuclear power cannot be a solution in the climate crisis." At the time, Germany was engaging in a nuclear phaseout while experiencing an energy crisis and heavily relying on coal and natural gas for power generation.

=== Federal Minister of Economic Cooperation and Development, 2021–2025 ===
After the SPD won the 2021 election, Olaf Scholz succeeded Merkel as Chancellor and named Schulze as Federal Ministry for Economic Cooperation and Development, while, under the terms of the traffic light coalition agreement, Steffi Lemke of the Greens took Schulze's old job as Environment Minister. Schulze took office in her new role on 8 December 2021. Along with Hubertus Heil, she was the longest-serving member of the Scholz cabinet by the time she left office.

In her capacity as minister, Schulze chaired the meetings of the Group of Seven (G7) development ministers when Germany held the group's rotating presidency in 2022. In April 2022, she also co-hosted a donor conference which helped raise $4.8 billion in funding pledges for the vaccine-sharing scheme COVAX. In response to the 2022 food crises, she led G7 efforts to establish the Global Alliance for Food Security, jointly convened with the World Bank.

In September 2022, Schulze made available an additional 200 million euros ($199.02 million) to fund Ukraine's aid programs for those internally displaced as a result of Russia's invasion.

In October 2023, Schulze joined the first joint cabinet retreat of the German and French governments in Hamburg, chaired by Scholz and President Emmanuel Macron.

=== Member of the German Parliament, 2021–present ===
Since leaving government in 2025, Schulze has been a member of the German Parliament's Budget Committee and its Subcommittee on European Affairs. In this capacity, she has been her parliamentary group's rapporteur on the annual budget of the Federal Ministry of Research, Technology and Space and a member of the so-called Confidential Committee (Vertrauensgremium) of the Budget Committee, which provides budgetary supervision for Germany's three intelligence services, BND, BfV and MAD.

In addition to her committee assignments, Schulze is part of the German-Italian Parliamentary Friendship Group.

== Other activities ==
=== International organizations ===
- Joint World Bank-IMF Development Committee, member (2022–2025)
- Multilateral Investment Guarantee Agency (MIGA), World Bank Group, Ex-Officio Member of the Board of Governors (2021–2025)
- World Bank, ex-officio member of the Board of Governors (2021–2025)

=== Corporate boards ===
- KfW, ex-officio member of the Board of Supervisory Directors (2018–2025)
- NRW.BANK, member of the Parliamentary Advisory Board (2017–2018)

=== Non-profit organizations ===
- German Foundation for World Population (DSW), member of the Parliamentary Advisory Board (since 2026)
- Friends of the Global Fund (Europe), member of the Board of Directors (since 2025)
- Rotary International, chair of the German Parliamentary Advisory Board of "End Polio Now" (since 2025)
- Business Forum of the Social Democratic Party of Germany, member of the Political Advisory Board (since 2020)
- ZDF, member of the Program Committee (since 2019)
- German Research Foundation (DFG), member of the Joint Committee (2010–2017)
- Max Planck Society, member of the Senate (2010–2017)
- Heinrich Hertz Foundation, chairwoman of the Board of Trustees (2010–2017)
- North Rhine-Westphalian Academy of Sciences, Humanities and the Arts, deputy chairwoman of the Board of Trustees (2010–2017)
- German United Services Trade Union (ver.di), member
- IG Bergbau, Chemie, Energie (IG BCE), member
- Arbeiterwohlfahrt, member
- Naturschutzbund Deutschland (NABU), member
- Slow Food, member
- "Frauenzeiten", co-founder

== Political positions ==
Amid the COVID-19 pandemic, Schulze opposed a waiver from certain provisions of the TRIPS Agreement for the Prevention, Containment and Treatment of COVID-19. In a 2021 interview with RedaktionsNetzwerk Deutschland, she argued that "as a former science minister, I see patent protection as the basis for successful research and development" and that "the manufacturing process for modern vaccines is so technically demanding and complex that suspending it would not help at all."

== Personal life ==
Schulze has been married to Italian-born trade unionist Andrea Arcais since 2011. The couple live in Münster. Schulze is a vegetarian.
