= Cabinet Kraft I =

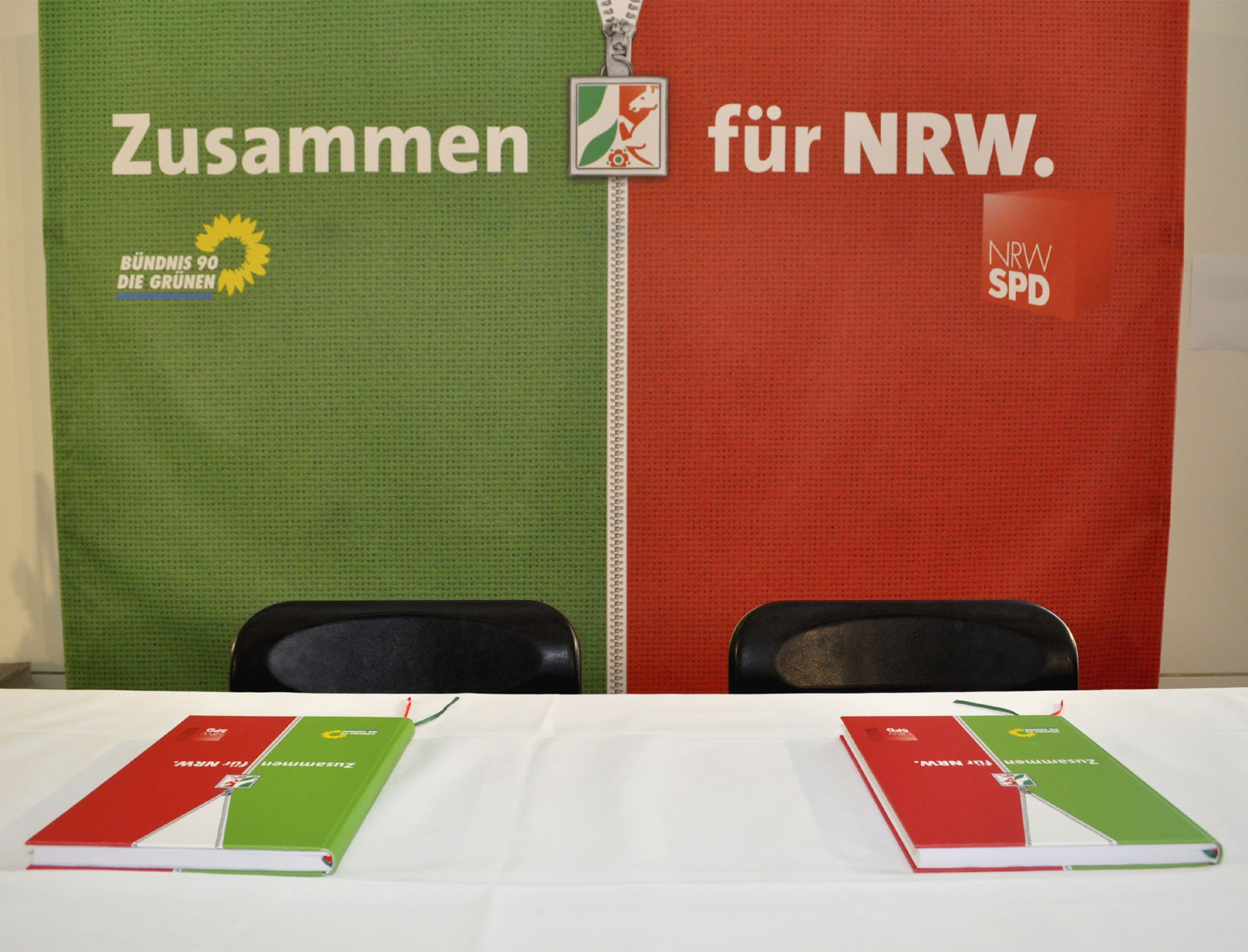
Signing of the coalition agreement of Cabinet Kraft 2010.

Cabinet Kraft was the name of the government of the German state of North Rhine-Westphalia from July 2010 until June 2012.

Its leader was Hannelore Kraft, elected and sworn in as Minister-President by the Landtag of North Rhine-Westphalia on 14 July 2010. The following day she appointed and swore in her cabinet.

The government was a coalition government of the center-left Social Democratic Party of Germany and the Green party, who formed a minority government that was short of one seat from the absolute majority in the state parliament, the Landtag. The government failed to get its budget approved by the Parliament in 2012, so the Parliament was dissolved. The subsequent election was won by the two governing parties who went on to form Cabinet Kraft II.

The following table shows cabinet members, who held the office of ministers of their respective portfolio except when denoted otherwise. Note that only the Ministers are members of the Cabinet. The Head of the Minister-President's Office, as a Secretary of State, is not an official member of cabinet, but is invited as non-voting attendee.

Office	Name	Party	Secretary of State
Minister-President	Hannelore Kraft	SPD	Franz-Josef Lersch-Mense; Head of the Minister-President's Office
Minister-President	Hannelore Kraft	SPD	Thomas Breustedt; Government Spokesman
Deputy Prime Minister; Schools and Education	Sylvia Löhrmann	Greens	-
Finance	Norbert Walter-Borjans	SPD	Rüdiger Messal
Interior and Local Government	Ralf Jäger	SPD	Hans-Ulrich Krüger
Justice	Thomas Kutschaty	SPD	Brigitte Mandt (until 25 January 2012); Karl-Heinz Krems (from 26 May 2012)
Economics, Energy, Transport and Building	Harry Voigtsberger	SPD	Horst-Helmut Becker; Deputy Minister & Secretary of State for Transport; Günther Horzetzky
Innovation, Science and Research	Svenja Schulze	SPD	Helmut Dockter
Labour, Integration and Social Affairs	Guntram Schneider	SPD	Wilhelm Schäffer; Zülfiye Kaykin; Secretary of State for Integration
Family, Children, Youth, Culture and Sport	Ute Schäfer	SPD	Klaus Schäfer (politician)
Climate Change, Environment, Agriculture and Consumer Protection	Johannes Remmel	Greens	Udo Paschedag
Health, Emancipation, Care and the Elder	Barbara Steffens	Greens	Marlis Bredehorst
Federal Affairs, Europe and Media	Angelica Schwall-Düren	SPD	Marc Jan Eumann
