= Ralf Jäger =

German politician (born 1961)

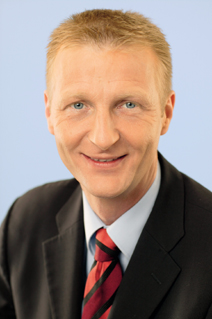
- Jäger
- Born: 25 March 1961 (age 65); Duisburg, North Rhine-Westphalia, Germany
- Education: Abitur
- Occupation: Politician

Ralf Jäger (born 25 March 1961 in Duisburg) is a German politician. He is a member of the SPD. Since 2000 he has been an MP of the Landtag, the parliament of North Rhine-Westphalia. Between 2010 and 2017 he served as Minister for Interior and Local Government of North Rhine-Westphalia, in the cabinet of Minister-President Hannelore Kraft. In 2014 he was chairman of the Standing Conference of Interior Ministers ("Innenministerkonferenz", IMK) in Germany.

== Early life and education ==
After his high school diploma ("Abitur") in 1981 Jäger finished his vocational training as a merchant in wholesale and foreign trade. Since 1983 he has been a party member of the SPD. Jäger then studied educational science in Duisburg but did not complete his studies. From 1985 to 2000 he worked as a subject specialist ("Fachreferent") for health care.

== Political career ==
From 1989 to 2000 Jäger was a member of the City Council of Duisburg. In 2000 he was elected MP for North Rhine-Westphalia and was re-elected 2005, 2010, and 2012. On 15 July 2010 he was appointed as State Minister for Home Affairs of North Rhine-Westphalia in the Cabinet Kraft I. On 20 June 2012 he was appointed again for the Cabinet Kraft II. As one of the state’s representatives at the Bundesrat, Jäger is a member of the Committee on Internal Affairs.

In the negotiations to form a Grand Coalition of Chancellor Angela Merkel's Christian Democrats (CDU together with the Bavarian CSU) and the SPD following the 2013 German elections, Jäger was part of the SPD delegation in the working group on internal and legal affairs, led by Hans-Peter Friedrich and Thomas Oppermann.

Jäger was criticised for his handling of the Hogesa demonstrations. He also faced criticism during the aftermath of the New Year's Eve sexual assaults in Germany. The opposition parties in the Landtag criticised him for "acting too late", CDU Secretary General Peter Tauber urged him to step down because of the events.

Jäger was a SPD Party delegate to the Federal Convention for the purpose of electing the President of Germany in 2017.

Following his party’s loss in the 2017 state elections, Jäger remained a member of the State Parliament where he currently serves on the Committee on Sports.

== Other activities ==
- German Forum for Crime Prevention (DFK), Ex-Officio Member of the Board of Trustees (2010-2017)
- IG Bauen-Agrar-Umwelt, Member (since 2004)
- ver.di, Member (since 1985)
