= Bakum (disambiguation) =

Bakum is a municipality in Lower Saxony, Germany.

Bakum may also refer to:

- Bakum, one of the parts of meitav, Israeli military unit
- Bakum, a colloquial form of the Russian male first name Avvakum
- Rodion Bakum (born 1990), German politician
