= SPD North Rhine-Westphalia =

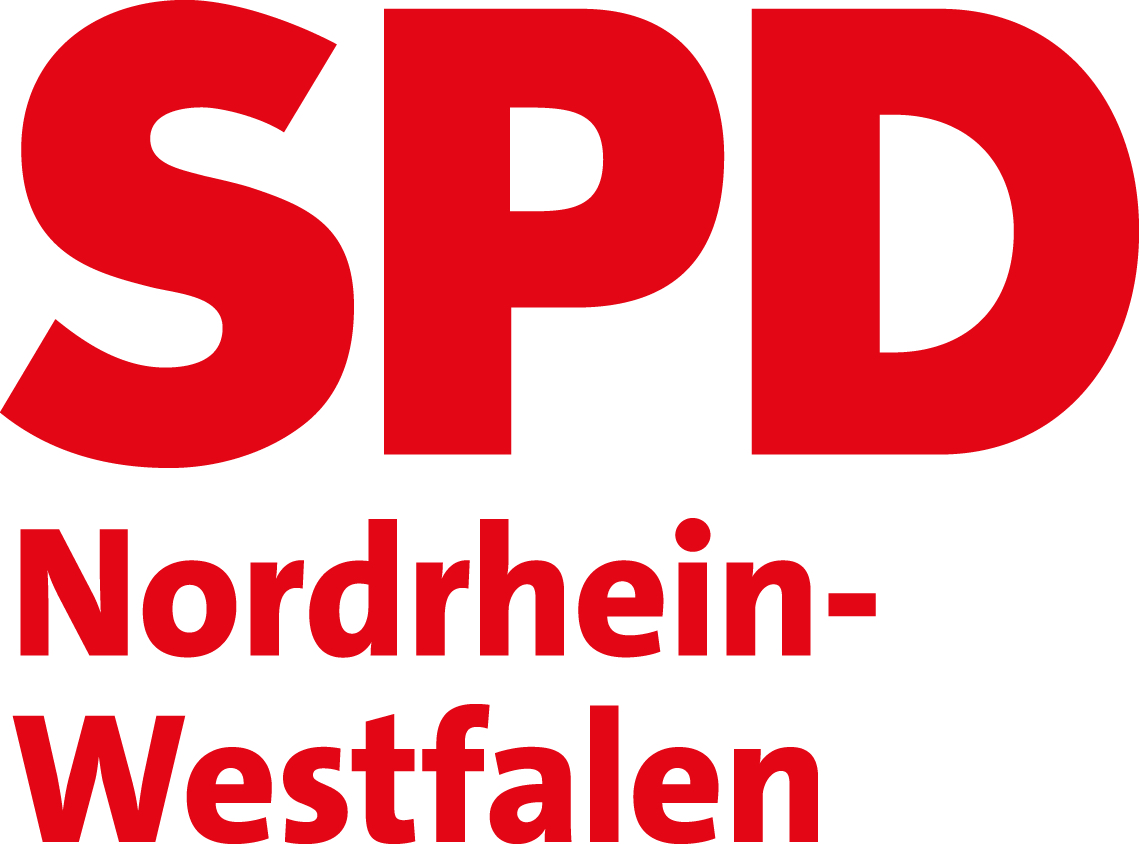
- Leader: Achim Post, Sarah Philipp
- Founded: 5 December 1970; 55 years ago
- Membership (June 2022): 97,300
- Ideology: Social democracy Pro-Europeanism
- Political position: Centre-left
- National affiliation: Social Democratic Party
- Colours: Red
- Landtag of North Rhine-Westphalia: 56 / 195
- Bundestag delegation: 49 / 155

Website
- www.nrwspd.de

SPD Nordrhein-Westfalen is a political party in German state North Rhine-Westphalia and is, with 97,300 members, the biggest state group of Social Democratic Party of Germany (SPD).

== History ==
Minister-President of State North Rhine-Westphalia
Name	Living/Lived	begin	end	picture
Fritz Steinhoff	1897–1969	1956	1958	
Heinz Kühn	1912–1992	1966	1978	
Johannes Rau	1931–2006	1978	1998	
Wolfgang Clement	1940–2020	1998	2002	
Peer Steinbrück	* 1947	2002	2005	
Hannelore Kraft	* 1961	14 July 2010	2017	

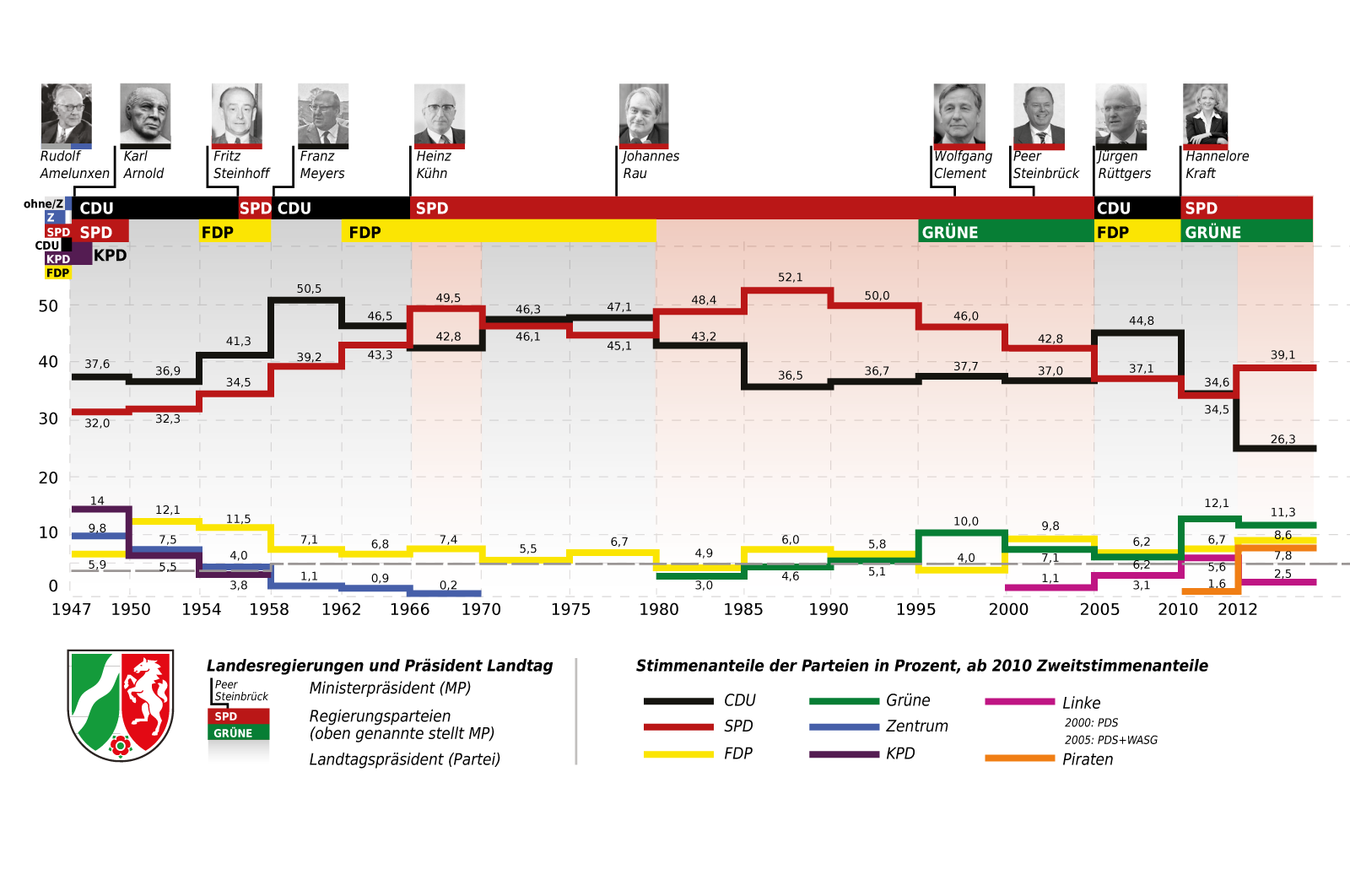
Landtagswahlen und Landesregierungen seit 1946

== Election results ==
=== Landtag of North Rhine-Westphalia ===
Election	Popular Vote		Seats	+/–	Government
Election	Votes	%	Seats	+/–	Government
1947	1,607,487	32.0 (#2)	64 / 216		CDU–SPD-KPD-DZP
1950	2,005,312	32.3 (#2)	68 / 215	▲4	Opposition
1954	2,387,718	34.5(#2)	76 / 200	▲8	SPD-FDP-DZP(1956-58)
1958	3,115,738	39.2 (#2)	81 / 200	▲5	Opposition
1962	3,497,179	43.3 (#2)	90 / 200	▲9	Opposition
1966	4,226,604	49.5 (#1)	99 / 200	▲9	SPD-FDP
1970	3,996,808	46.1 (#2)	94 / 200	▼5	SPD-FDP
1975	4,630,995	45.1 (#2)	91 / 200	▼3	SPD-FDP
1980	4,756,103	48.4 (#1)	106 / 201	▲15	SPD majority
1985	4,942,346	52.1 (#1)	125 / 227	▲19	SPD majority
1990	4,644,431	50.0 (#1)	122 / 237	▼3	SPD majority
1995	3,816,639	46.0 (#1)	108 / 221	▼14	SPD-Greens
2000	3,143,179	42.8 (#1)	102 / 231	▼6	SPD-Greens
2005	3,058,988	37.1 (#2)	74 / 187	▼28	Opposition
2010	2,980,311	34.5 (#2)	67 / 181	▼7	SPD-Greens
2012	3,290,561	39.1 (#1)	99 / 237	▲32	SPD-Greens
2017	2,919,073	31.2 (#2)	69 / 199	▼30	Opposition
2022	2,092,933	26.7 (#2)	56 / 195	▼13	Opposition

== Structure ==
Regional organizations of SPD state group:{

- Region Westliches Westfalen (Western Westphalia), covering the Regierungsbezirke Arnsberg and Münster
- Region Niederrhein (Lower Rhine), covering the Regierungsbezirk Düsseldorf
- Region Mittelrhein (Central Rhine), covering the Regierungsbezirk Cologne
- Region Ostwestfalen-Lippe (Eastern Westphalia-Lippe), covering the Regierungsbezirk Detmold

The Regions are headgroups of 54 lower state groups (Unterbezirke), each covering either a district-free City (Kreisfreie Stadt) or a District (Kreis).

== Chairman ==
Years	Head
1970–1973	Heinz Kühn
1973–1977	Werner Figgen
1977–1998	Johannes Rau
1998–2002	Franz Müntefering
2002–2005	Harald Schartau
2005–2007	Jochen Dieckmann
2007–2017	Hannelore Kraft
2017–2018	Michael Groschek
2018–2021	Sebastian Hartmann
2021–2023	Thomas Kutschaty
2023–present	Sarah Philipp and Achim Post
