= Cabinet Kraft II =

Cabinet Kraft II was the name of the government of the German state of North Rhine-Westphalia from June 2012 until June 2017.

Its leader is Minister-President Hannelore Kraft. Kraft was reelected by the Landtag of North Rhine-Westphalia on 20 June 2012. She has already led the previous government. Kraft's government is a coalition between the Social Democratic Party of Germany (SPD) and The Greens. There were only little changes from the previous government to this one.

The following table shows cabinet members, who hold the office of ministers of their respective portfolio except when denoted otherwise. Note that only the Ministers are members of the Cabinet. The Head of the Minister-President's Office, as a Secretary of State, is not an official member of cabinet, but is invited as non-voting attendee.

Office	Name	Party	Secretary of State
Minister-President	Hannelore Kraft	SPD	Franz-Josef Lersch-Mense; Head of the Minister-President's Office
Minister-President	Hannelore Kraft	SPD	Thomas Breustedt; Government Spokesman
Deputy Prime Minister; Schools and Education	Sylvia Löhrmann	Greens	Ludwig Hecke
Finance	Norbert Walter-Borjans	SPD	Rüdiger Messal
Interior and Local Government	Ralf Jäger	SPD	Hans-Ulrich Krüger
Justice	Thomas Kutschaty	SPD	Karl-Heinz Krems
Economics, Energy, Industry and Commerce	Garrelt Duin	SPD	Günther Horzetzky
Construction, Housing, Urban Development and Transport	Michael Groscheck	SPD	Gunther Adler
Innovation, Science and Research	Svenja Schulze	SPD	Helmut Dockter
Labour, Integration and Social Affairs	Guntram Schneider	SPD	Wilhelm Schäffer; Zülfiye Kaykin; Secretary of State for Integration
Family, Children, Youth, Culture and Sport	Ute Schäfer	SPD	Klaus Schäfer (politician)
Climate Change, Environment, Agriculture and Consumer Protection	Johannes Remmel	Greens	Udo Paschedag
Health, Emancipation, Care and the Elder	Barbara Steffens	Greens	Marlis Bredehorst
Federal Affairs, Europe and Media	Angelica Schwall-Düren	SPD	Marc Jan Eumann
