= Angelica Schwall-Düren =

German Politician of the Social Democratic Party

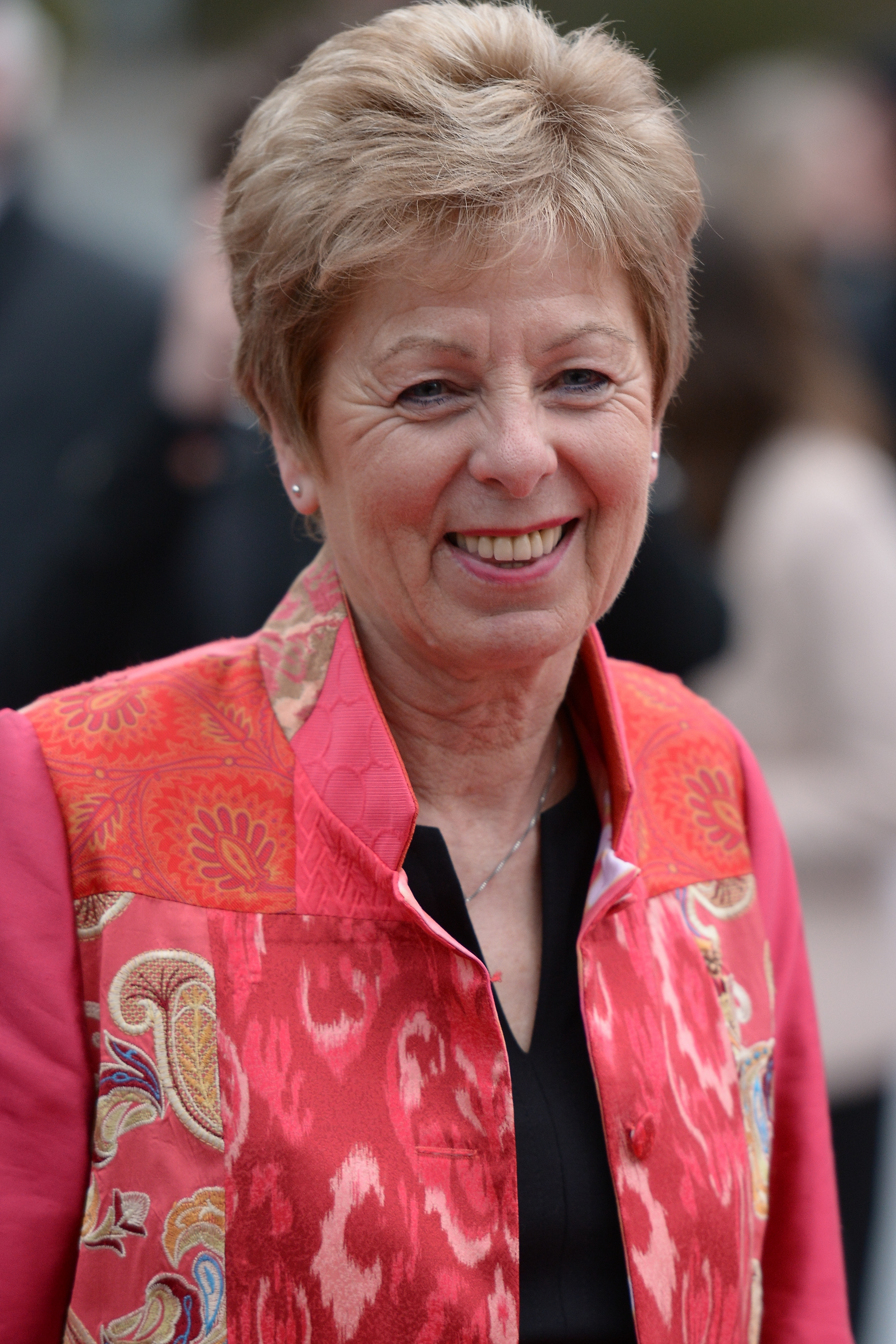
Angelica Schwall-Düren in 2015

Angelica Klara Schwall-Düren née Düren (born 16 July 1948 in Offenburg) is a German politician of the Social Democratic Party (SPD).

From 2002 to 2010, she was deputy chairwoman of the SPD parliamentary group in the Bundestag. On 15 July 2010 she was appointed Minister for Federal Affairs, Europe and Media of North Rhine-Westphalia in the first cabinet of Minister-President Hannelore Kraft. On 21 June 2012 she was also appointed to this position in the second cabinet of Minister-President Hannelore Kraft and held this office until 1 October 2015.

== Early life ==
After graduating from high school in Offenburg in 1967 Schwall-Düren studied history, political science and French as a teacher in Freiburg im Breisgau, Montpellier and Münster, which she completed in 1973 with the first state examination for teaching at grammar schools. She then worked as a research assistant at the University of Freiburg. In 1977 she completed her doctorate at the University of Freiburg.

== Career ==
From 1979 to 1994 she was a member of the local council in her hometown of Metelen.

She was a member of the German Bundestag from 1994 to 2010. From 1998 to 2002 she was Parliamentary Secretary of the SPD parliamentary group. From October 2002 until she joined the North Rhine-Westphalian state government on 15 July 2010 she was deputy leader of the parliamentary group responsible for European Union affairs.

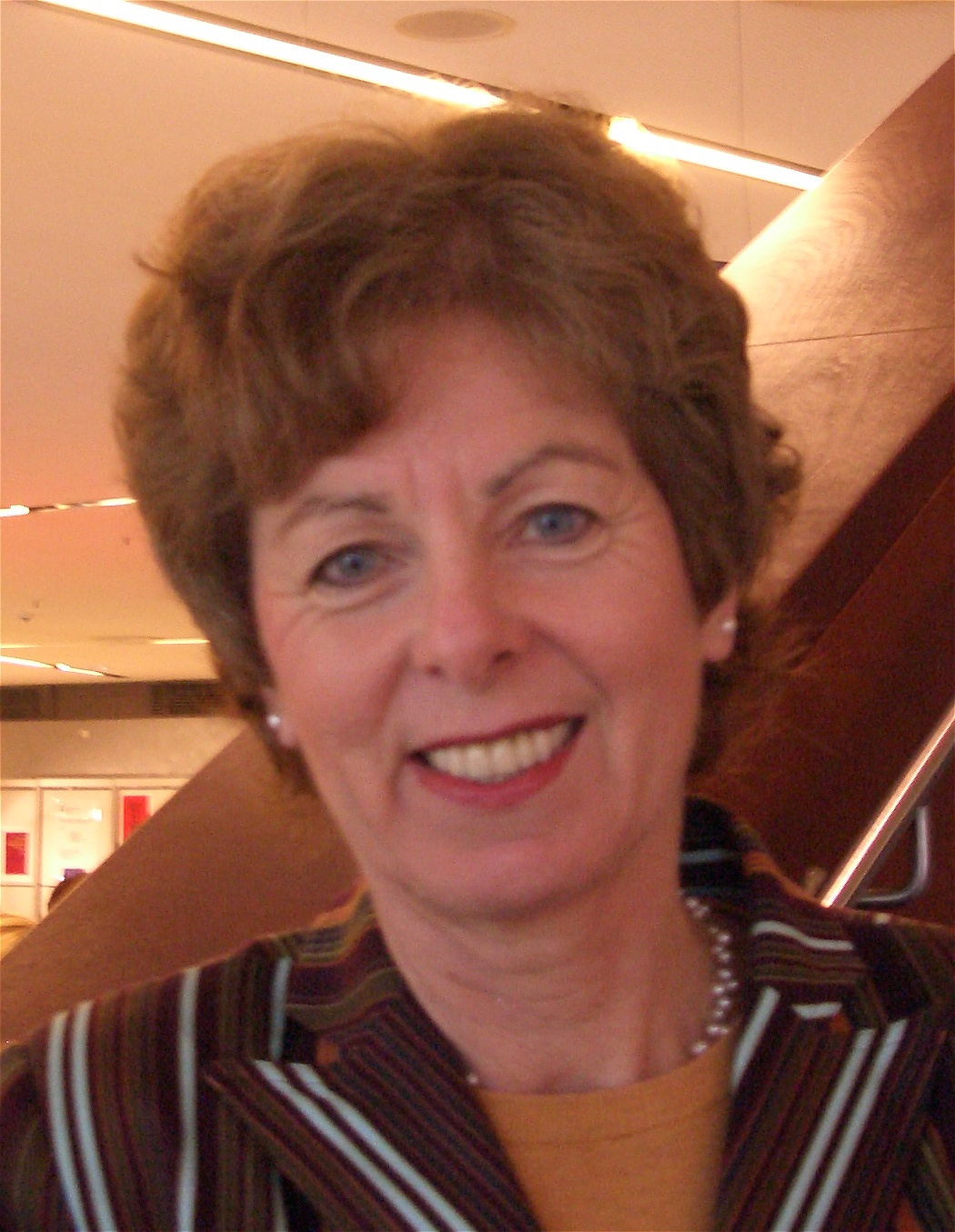
Schwall-Düren in 2005

She has been a representative for the state of North Rhine-Westphalia, on the Deutschlandradio Board of Directors since 2014.
