= Rodion Bakum =

German politician (born 1990)

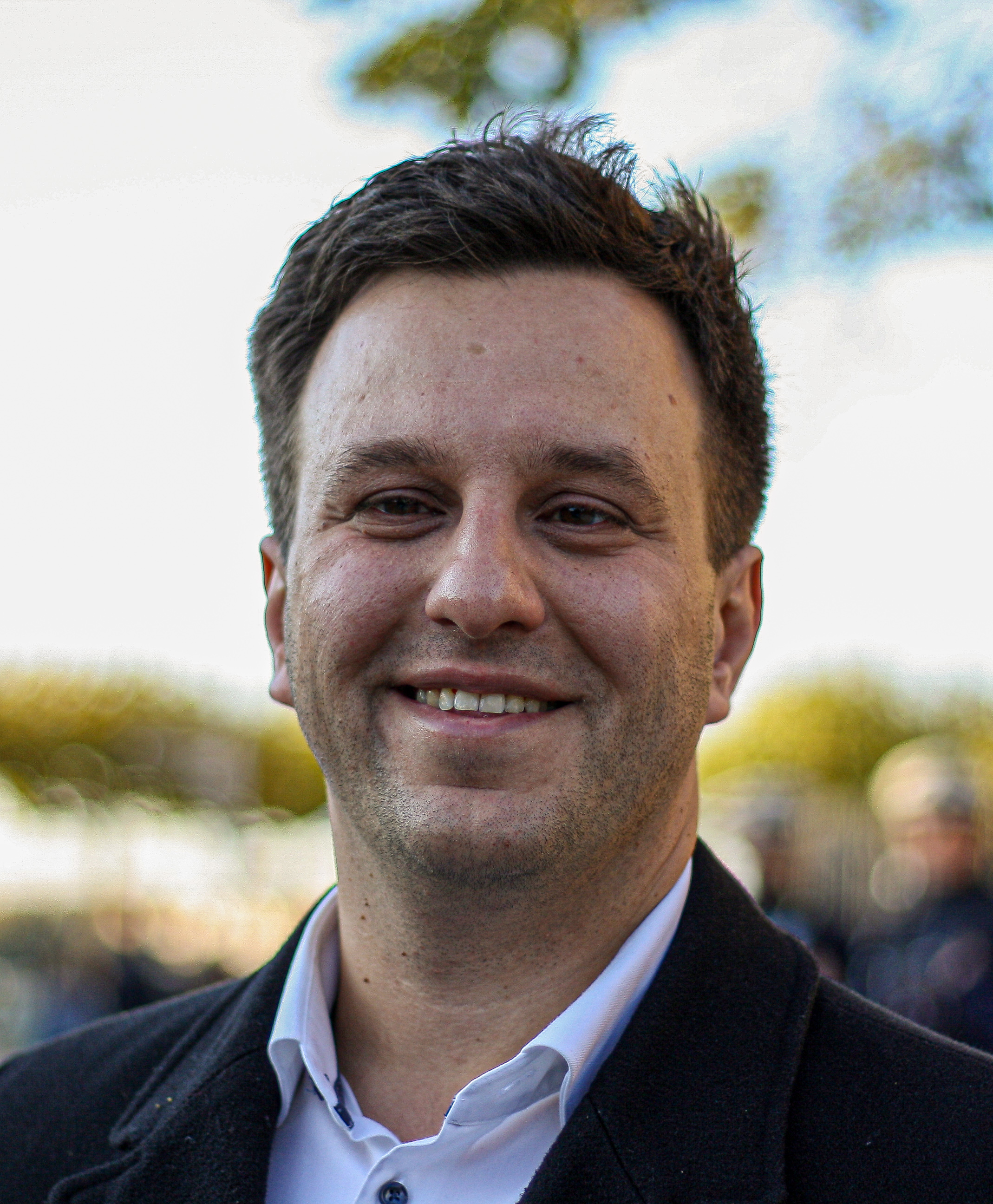
- Bakum in 2024

Member of the Landtag of North Rhine-Westphalia
- Incumbent
- Assumed office 1 June 2022
- Preceded by: Hannelore Kraft
- Constituency: Mülheim I

Personal details
- Born: 26 October 1990 (age 35) Kyiv
- Party: Social Democratic Party (since 2009)

Rodion Bakum (born 26 October 1990 in Kyiv) is a Soviet-born German politician serving as a member of the Landtag of North Rhine-Westphalia since 2022. He has served as chairman of the Social Democratic Party in Mülheim since 2019.
