= Sylvia Löhrmann =

German politician (born 1957)

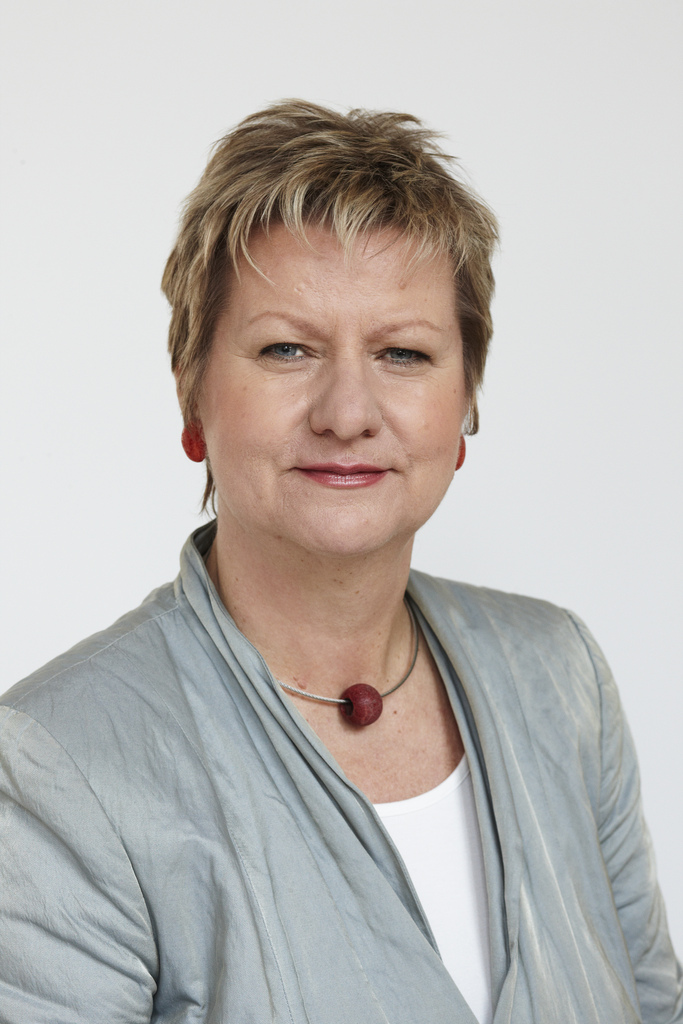
- Sylvia Löhrmann in January 2010

Deputy Minister-President of North Rhine-Westphalia
- In office 14 July 2010 – 2017
- Preceded by: Andreas Pinkwart
- Succeeded by: Joachim Stamp

State Minister of School and Further Education of North Rhine-Westphalia
- In office 14 July 2010 – 2017
- Preceded by: Barbara Sommer
- Succeeded by: Yvonne Gebauer

Personal details
- Born: 1 March 1957 (age 69) Essen, West Germany
- Party: Green Party

Sylvia Löhrmann (born 1 March 1957, Essen, West Germany) is a German politician of the Green Party. From 2010 to 2017 she was Deputy Prime Minister of North Rhine-Westphalia and State Minister of School and Further Education.

== Education and early career ==
Löhrmann studied German and English from 1975 to 1981 at the Ruhr University Bochum and later worked as a teacher.

== Political career ==
Löhrmann is a member of the Green Party, and since 1995 an elected member of the parliament of the German state North Rhine-Westphalia. Since July 15, 2010 she has served as Deputy Minister-President and Minister of Schools and Education in the incumbent state-government under the leadership of Minister-President Hannelore Kraft. As one of the state's representatives at the Bundesrat, she is a member of the Committee on Cultural Affairs.

On 25 March 2015, Löhrmann spoke at the memorial for 16 schoolchildren and two teachers of Joseph-König-Gymnasium who all died in the crash of Germanwings Flight 9525.

Löhrmann was a Green Party delegate to the Federal Convention for the purpose of electing the President of Germany in 2017.

Following the Green Party's defeat in the 2017 state elections, Löhrmann was no longer a member of the state government and also resigned her parliamentary seat. In 2020, she was appointed secretary general of "321–2021: 1700 Years of Jewish Life in Germany".

== Other activities ==
=== Corporate boards ===
- Stadt-Sparkasse Solingen, Member of the Supervisory Board
- NRW.BANK, Member of the Guarantors' Meeting (2010–2017)

=== Non-profit organizations ===
- Grüner Wirtschaftsdialog, Member of the Advisory Board (since 2021)
- Heinrich Böll Foundation, Member of the General Assembly
- Aktive Bürgerschaft, Member of the Board of Trustees
- Central Committee of German Catholics, Member
- Deutschlandradio, Member of the Broadcasting Council
- Jugend forscht, Member of the Board of Trustees
- Stiftung Lesen, Deputy Chairwoman of the Board of Trustees
- Heinrich Heine University (HHU), Institut für Deutsches und Internationales Parteienrecht und Parteienforschung, Member of the Board of Trustees
- Education and Science Workers' Union (GEW), Member
