= 2017 North Rhine-Westphalia state election =

State election in Germany

- 14 May 2017

All 199 seats in the Landtag of North Rhine-Westphalia 100 seats needed for a majority
- Turnout: 8,577,221 (65.2% ▲5.6 pp)
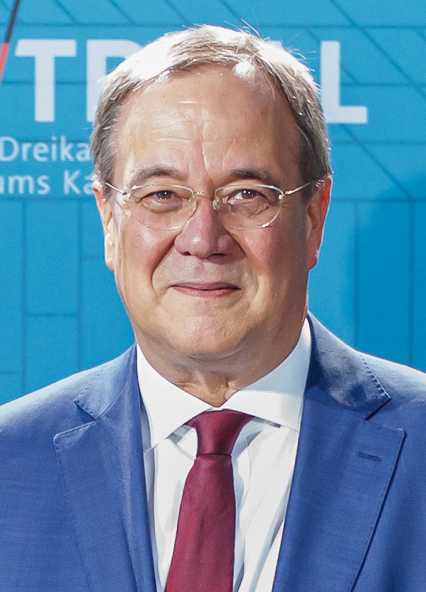

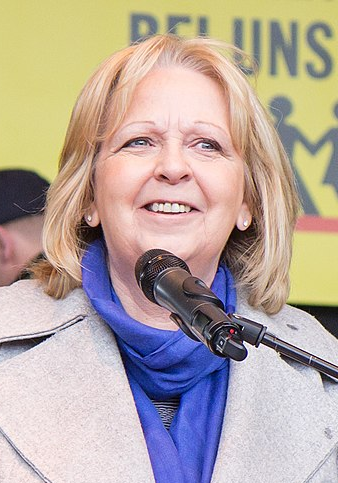

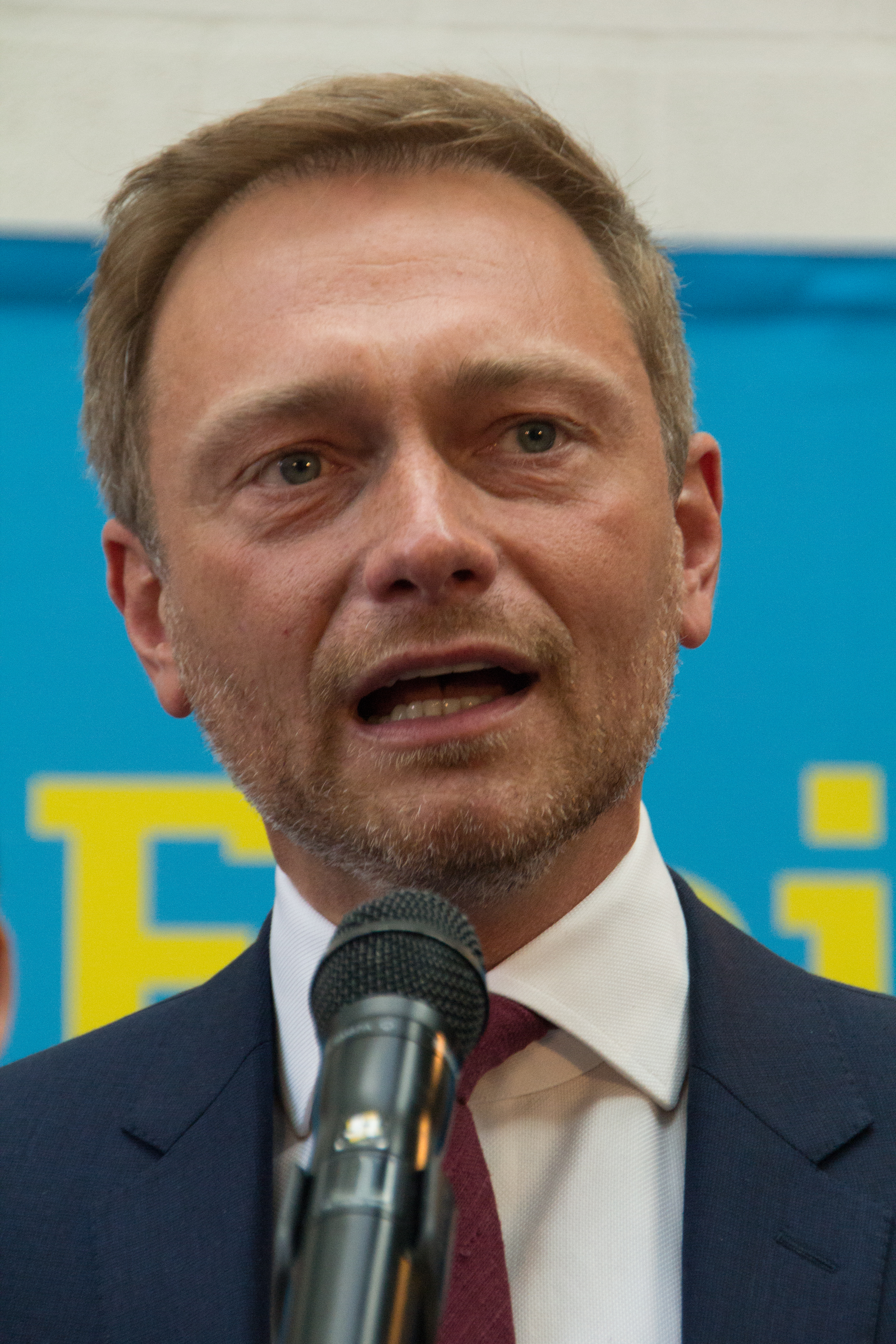

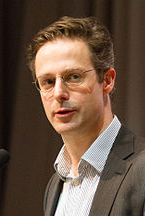

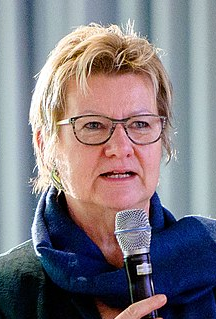
	First party	Second party	Third party
Candidate	Armin Laschet	Hannelore Kraft	Christian Lindner
Party	CDU	SPD	FDP
Last election	67 seats, 26.3%	99 seats, 39.1%	22 seats, 8.6%
Seats won	72	69	28
Seat change	▲5	▼30	▲6
Popular vote	2,796,683	2,649,205	1,065,307
Percentage	33.0%	31.2%	12.6%
Swing	▲6.7 pp	▼7.9 pp	▲4.0 pp
	Fourth party	Fifth party
Candidate	Marcus Pretzell	Sylvia Löhrmann
Party	AfD	Greens
Last election	Did not exist	29 seats, 11.3%
Seats won	16	14
Seat change	▲16	▼15
Popular vote	626,756	539,062
Percentage	7.4%	6.4%
Swing	New party	▼4.9 pp
- Results for the single-member constituencies
Government before election
Second Kraft cabinet
SPD–Green
Government after election
Laschet cabinet
CDU–FDP

The 2017 North Rhine-Westphalia state election was held on 14 May 2017 to elect the members of the Landtag of North Rhine-Westphalia. The incumbent coalition government of the Social Democratic Party (SPD) and The Greens led by Minister-President Hannelore Kraft was defeated. The Christian Democratic Union (CDU) became the largest party and formed a coalition with the Free Democratic Party (FDP). CDU leader Armin Laschet was subsequently elected Minister-President.

This election was the last election in which an incumbent Minister-President was defeated until the 2022 Saarland state election.

== Parties ==
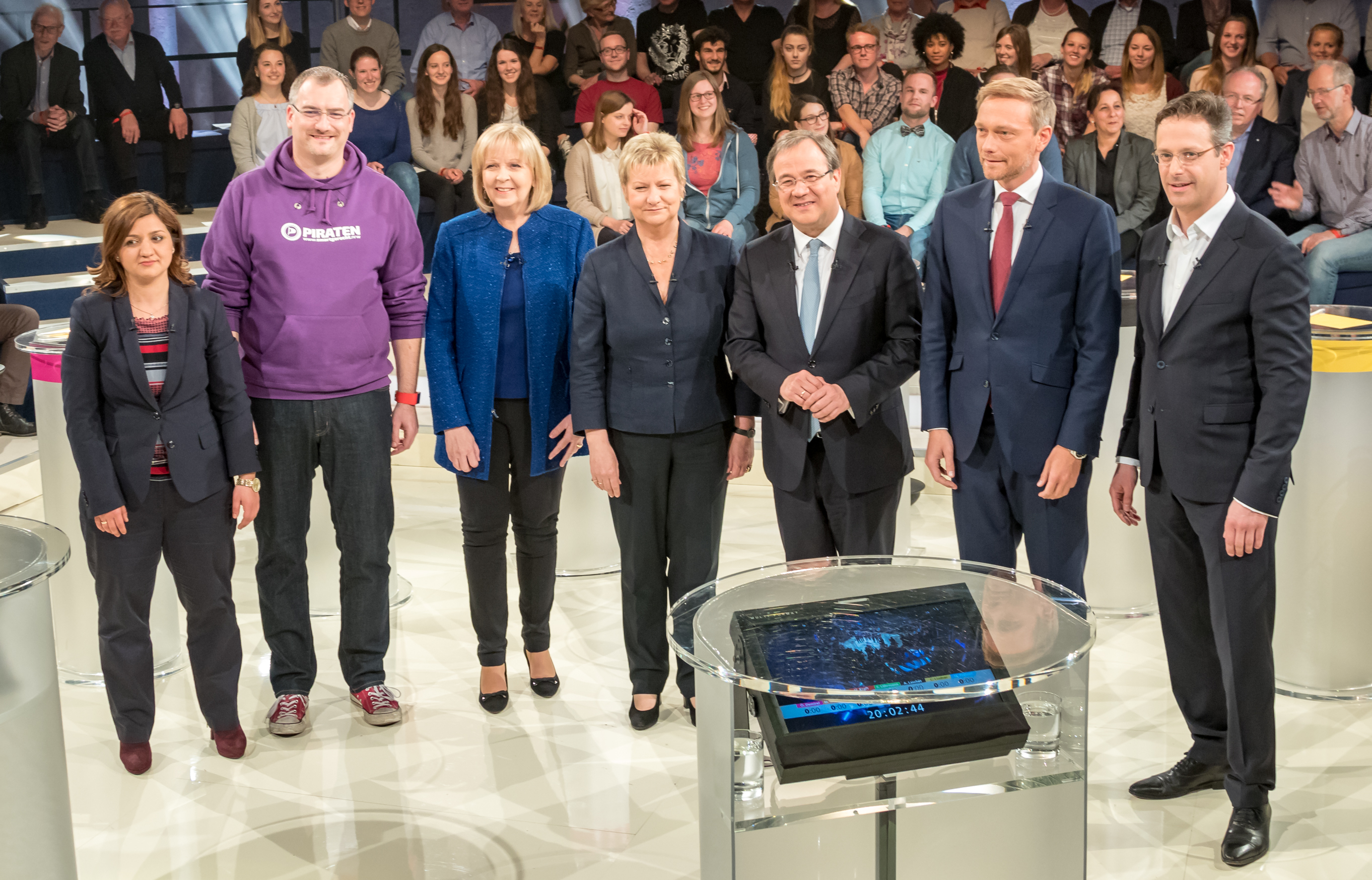
The lead candidates after a TV debate

The table below lists parties represented in the previous Landtag of North Rhine-Westphalia.

Name		Ideology	Leader(s)	2012 result	
Name		Ideology	Leader(s)	Votes (%)	Seats
SPD	Social Democratic Party of Germany; Sozialdemokratische Partei Deutschlands	Social democracy	Hannelore Kraft	39.1%	99 / 237
CDU	Christian Democratic Union of Germany; Christlich Demokratische Union Deutschlands	Christian democracy	Armin Laschet	26.3%	67 / 237
Grüne	Alliance 90/The Greens; Bündnis 90/Die Grünen	Green politics	Sylvia Löhrmann	11.3%	29 / 237
FDP	Free Democratic Party; Freie Demokratische Partei	Classical liberalism	Christian Lindner	8.6%	22 / 237
Piraten	Pirate Party Germany; Piratenpartei Deutschland	Pirate politics	Michele Marsching	7.8%	20 / 237

== Opinion polling ==
=== Party polling ===
Polling firm	Fieldwork date	Sample size	SPD	CDU	Grüne	FDP	Piraten	Linke	AfD	Others	Lead
2017 state election	14 May 2017	–	31.2	33.0	6.4	12.6	1.0	4.9	7.4	3.5	1.8
Forschungsgruppe Wahlen	8–11 May 2017	2,402	31	32	6.5	13.5	–	6	6.5	4.5	1
YouGov	8–10 May 2017	1,017	30	31	7	9	2	8	9	4	1
INSA	3–8 May 2017	1,139	33	30	7	13	–	5	7	5	3
Forschungsgruppe Wahlen	2–4 May 2017	1,032	32	32	7.5	12	–	6	6	4.5	Tie
Infratest dimap	2–3 May 2017	1,000	32	31	7	13	–	5	8	4	1
Forsa	20–25 Apr 2017	1,003	35	29	6	12	–	6	7	5	6
YouGov	12–19 Apr 2017	1,051	36	27	6	7	2	8	11	3	9
Infratest dimap	18–20 Apr 2017	1,003	34	34	6	10	–	5	8	3	Tie
INSA	30 Mar–4 Apr 2017	1,000	37	28	6	10	–	5	10	4	9
Infratest dimap	14–16 Mar 2017	1,001	37	30	6	9	–	5	9	4	7
Forsa	20 Feb–10 Mar 2017	1,040	40	26	6	11	–	5	7	5	14
INSA	22 Feb–3 Mar 2017	1,199	38	27	7	10	–	4	11	3	11
Infratest dimap	14–16 Feb 2017	1,002	37	30	7	7	–	6	10	3	7
Forschungsgruppe Wahlen	6–8 Feb 2017	1,116	36	32	7	8	–	5	9	3	4
YouGov	13–20 Jan 2017	1,072	31	31	11	7	1	5	12	2	Tie
Forsa	9–20 Jan 2017	1,072	35	29	8	9	–	6	8	5	6
Emnid	19 Dec 2016–18 Jan 2017	1,070	32	30	10	8	–	7	10	3	2
Infratest dimap	25–27 Oct 2016	1,002	32	32	12	7	–	5	9	3	Tie
YouGov	31 Aug–7 Sep 2016	1,022	34	28	10	9	–	5	11	?	6
Mentefactum	30 Aug–6 Sep 2016	1,004	31	27	11	8	–	5	13	3	4
Infratest dimap	17–20 May 2016	1,002	31	31	10	8	–	6	12	2	Tie
INSA	21–28 Apr 2016	1,097	29	32	13	7.5	–	5.5	9	4	3
Infratest dimap	16–18 Feb 2016	1,002	31	33	9	7	–	7	10	3	2
Infratest dimap	8–10 Dec 2015	1,000	34	35	10	6	–	5	5	5	1
Forsa	8–27 Nov 2015	1,211	39	29	10	7	2	5	4	4	10
YouGov	11–19 Nov 2015	1,022	34	30	11	5	1	5	9	5	4
Infratest dimap	1–3 Sep 2015	1,001	34	36	11	5	–	6	3	5	2
Infratest dimap	16–18 Jun 2015	1,000	36	35	10	6	1	5	4	3	1
Forsa	18–28 May 2015	1,097	36	32	11	9	–	4	3	5	4
INSA	21–22 May 2015	500	34	38	12	6	1	6	2	1	4
YouGov	3–10 Dec 2014	1,015	34	35	12	5	2	5	7	2	1
Infratest dimap	2–4 Dec 2014	1,000	35	36	10	5	1	5	5	3	1
Forsa	3–10 Nov 2014	1,082	36	33	10	4	2	5	6	?	3
Forsa	20–29 Aug 2014	1,506	39	32	10	5	3	4	4	?	7
YouGov	May 2014	1,006	39	34	10	5	2	5	?	?	5
Infratest dimap	5–8 May 2014	1,000	37	36	10	5	2	5	3	2	1
YouGov	25 Nov–1 Dec 2013	1,055	38	34	10	4	?	5	?	?	4
Infratest dimap	3–5 Dec 2013	1,000	37	38	8	4	3	5	3	2	1
YouGov	5–16 Sep 2013	1,051	38	35	11	4	2	4	?	?	3
Infratest dimap	3–5 Sep 2013	1,009	40	36	9	4	3	4	2	2	4
Infratest dimap	21–23 May 2013	1,001	39	35	14	4	2	3	–	3	4
YouGov	12–22 Apr 2013	1,104	42	31	12	6	2	3	–	4	11
Infratest dimap	11–14 Dec 2012	1,001	40	32	12	5	4	4	–	3	8
YouGov	4–24 Sep 2012	1,020	39	30	13	5	5	4	–	4	9
YouGov	1–11 Jun 2012	1,061	38	29	12	7	7	3	–	?	9
2012 state election	13 May 2012	–	39.1	26.3	11.3	8.6	7.8	2.5	–	4.3	12.8

=== Minister-President polling ===
Polling firm	Fieldwork date			Lead
Polling firm	Fieldwork date	Hannelore Kraft SPD	Armin Laschet CDU	Lead
Forschungsgruppe Wahlen	14 May 2017	48	37	11
Infratest dimap	14 May 2017	49	38	11
Forschungsgruppe Wahlen	11 May 2017	46	38	8
YouGov	11 May 2017	34	21	13
Forschungsgruppe Wahlen	5 May 2017	51	33	18
Infratest dimap	4 May 2017	49	28	21
Forsa	28 April 2017	49	25	24
YouGov	25 April 2017	42	21	21
Infratest dimap	23 April 2017	53	31	22
Infratest dimap	19 March 2017	57	22	35
Forsa	15 March 2017	55	22	33
Infratest dimap	19 February 2017	58	26	32
Forschungsgruppe Wahlen	10 February 2017	55	29	26
YouGov	27 January 2017	46	16	30
YouGov	30 October 2016	56	20	36
Mentefactum	11 September 2016	55	30	25
Infratest dimap	22 May 2016	58	28	30
Infratest dimap	13 December 2015	61	21	40
Forsa	2 December 2015	63	18	45
YouGov	26 November 2015	50	15	35
Infratest dimap	21 June 2015	64	17	47
YouGov	18 December 2014	48	19	29
Infratest dimap	7 December 2014	59	18	41
Infratest dimap	11 May 2014	61	18	43

== Results ==
The CDU became the largest party with 33% of the vote. The governing SPD and Greens suffered a 13-point swing between them, the latter losing half their seats. The FDP achieved their best ever result in the state at 12.6%, and AfD debuted at 7.4%. The Pirates collapsed to just 1% of the vote and were ousted from the Landtag. The Left doubled their vote share to 4.9%, but fell just short of the threshold.

Graph of the party split among 199 seats.
Party	Constituency				Party list				Total seats	+/–
Party	Votes	%	+/–	Seats	Votes	%	+/–	Seats	Total seats	+/–
Christian Democratic Union (CDU)	3,242,524	38.35	+5.64	72	2,796,683	32.95	+6.64	0	72	+5
Social Democratic Party (SPD)	2,919,073	34.52	–7.77	56	2,649,205	31.21	–7.92	13	69	–30
Free Democratic Party (FDP)	723,725	8.56	+3.77	0	1,065,307	12.55	+3.95	28	28	+6
Alternative for Germany (AfD)	460,479	5.45	New	0	626,756	7.38	New	16	16	New
Alliance 90/The Greens (GRÜNE)	509,571	6.03	–3.27	0	539,062	6.35	–5.00	14	14	–15
The Left (LINKE)	414,594	4.90	+2.31	0	415,936	4.90	+2.41	0	0	±0
Pirate Party Germany (Piraten)	118,847	1.41	–6.53	0	80,780	0.95	–6.87	0	0	–20
Action Party for Animal Protection (hier!)					59,747	0.70	New	0	0	New
Die PARTEI	25,923	0.31	+0.23	0	54,990	0.65	+0.36	0	0	±0
Free Voters	8,667	0.10	–0.04	0	33,083	0.39	+0.16	0	0	±0
National Democratic Party (NPD)					28,723	0.34	–0.17	0	0	±0
Alliance for Innovation and Justice (BIG)					17,421	0.21	+0.07	0	0	±0
Ecological Democratic Party (ÖDP)	7,208	0.09	+0.07	0	13,288	0.16	+0.06	0	0	±0
Alliance of German Democrats					12,688	0.15	New	0	0	New
V-Partei^{3}					10,013	0.12	New	0	0	New
New Start C (Aufbruch C)	2,919	0.03	New	0	9,636	0.11	New	0	0	New
From now... Democracy by Referendum (Volksabstimmung)	2,099	0.02	+0.01	0	8,386	0.10	New	0	0	±0
Marxist–Leninist Party of Germany (MLPD)	2,496	0.03	New	0	7,707	0.09	New	0	0	New
The Violets (VIOLETTEN)					7,171	0.08	New	0	0	New
Youth and Development Party of Germany (JED)					7,054	0.08	New	0	0	New
The Republicans (REP)	1,257	0.01	New	0	6,597	0.08	New	0	0	New
Party for Health Research (Gesundheitsforschung)					5,964	0.07	New	0	0	New
Basic Income Alliance (BGE)					5,260	0.06	New	0	0	New
Beautiful Life (Schöner Leben)					5,162	0.06	New	0	0	New
Democratic Citizens Germany (DBD)					4,742	0.06	New	0	0	New
The Right (RECHTE)	1,990	0.02	New	0	3,589	0.04	New	0	0	New
Centre Party (ZENTRUM)	1,182	0.01	New	0	3,336	0.04	New	0	0	New
German Communist Party (DKP)	2,416	0.03	New	0	2,899	0.03	New	0	0	New
Free Citizens Initiative/Free Voters (FBI)					2,877	0.03	–0.09	0	0	±0
Independent Voter Group "BRD"	634	0.01	New	0	2,002	0.02	New	0	0	New
PAN – the Independents					1,349	0.02	New	0	0	New
Family Party of Germany (FAMILIE)	291	0.00	–0.02	0					0	±0
Liberal Democrats (LD)	99	0.00	±0.00	0					0	±0
Liberal Conservative Reformers (LKR)	91	0.00	New	0					0	New
Independents	9,105	0.11	+0.08	0					0	±0
Total	8,455,190	100.00	–	128	8,487,413	100.00	–	71	199	–38
Valid votes	8,455,190	98.58			8,487,413	98.95				
Invalid/blank votes	122,031	1.42			89,808	1.05				
Total votes	8,577,221	100.00			8,577,221	100.00				
Registered voters/turnout	13,164,887	65.15			13,164,887	65.15				
