= NRW.Bank =

State development bank of North Rhine-Westphalia

- Company type: Anstalt des öffentlichen Rechts (institution under public law)
- Industry: Banking, Financial services
- Founded: 2002; 24 years ago
- Headquarters: Düsseldorf and Münster, Germany
- Area served: Germany
- Key people: Mona Neubaur; Gabriela Pantring; Peter Stemper; Claudia Hillenherms; Johanna Antonie Tjaden-Schulte
- Total assets: € 164.1 billion (2025)
- Number of employees: 1687 (2025)
- Website: www.nrwbank.com

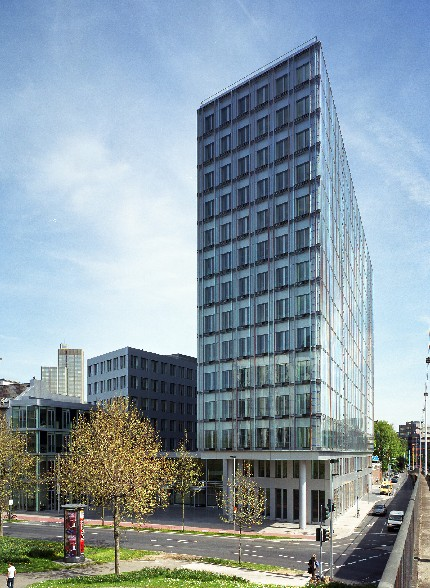
Headquarters of NRW.Bank in Düsseldorf

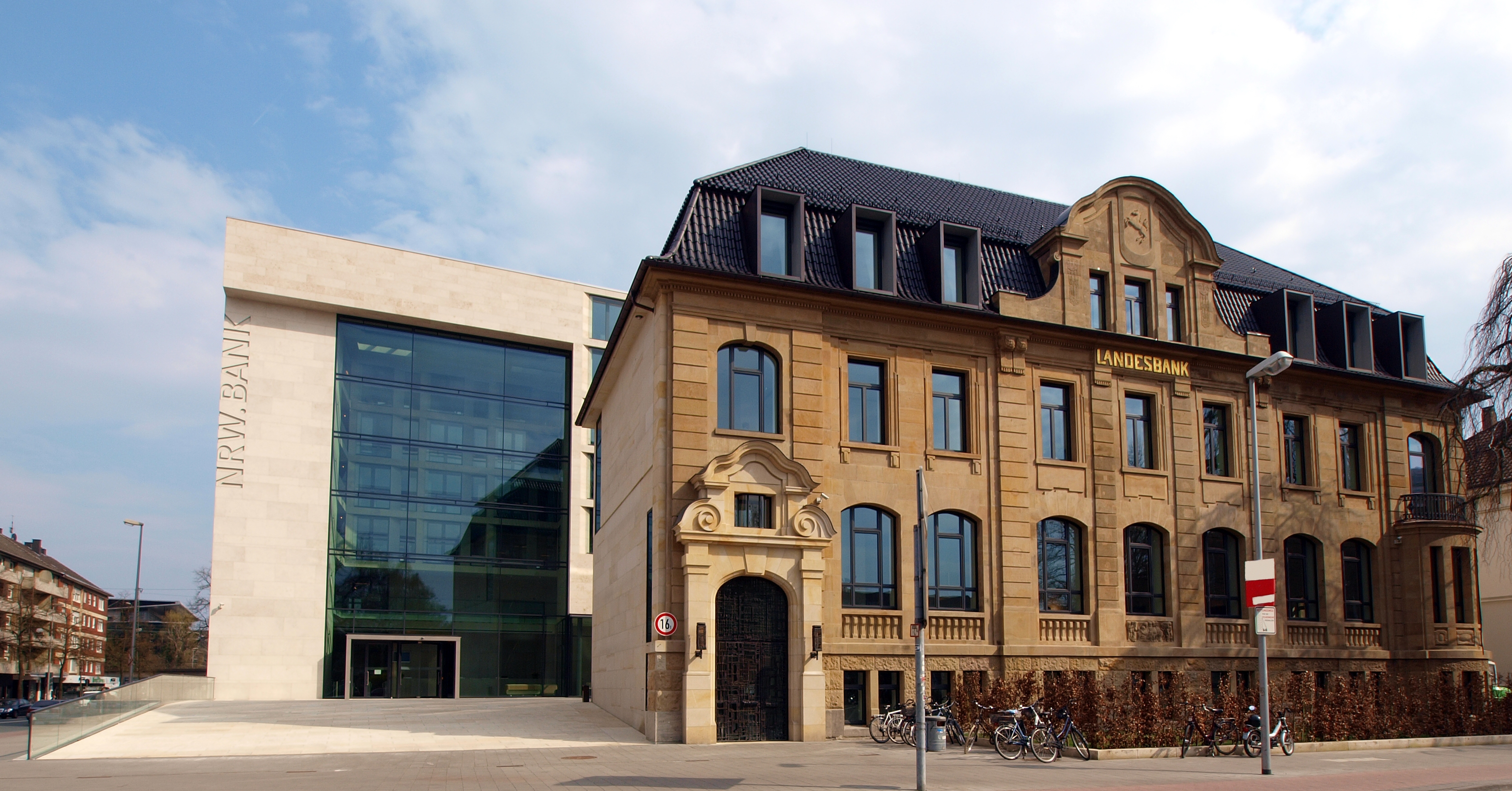
Headquarters of NRW.Bank in Münster

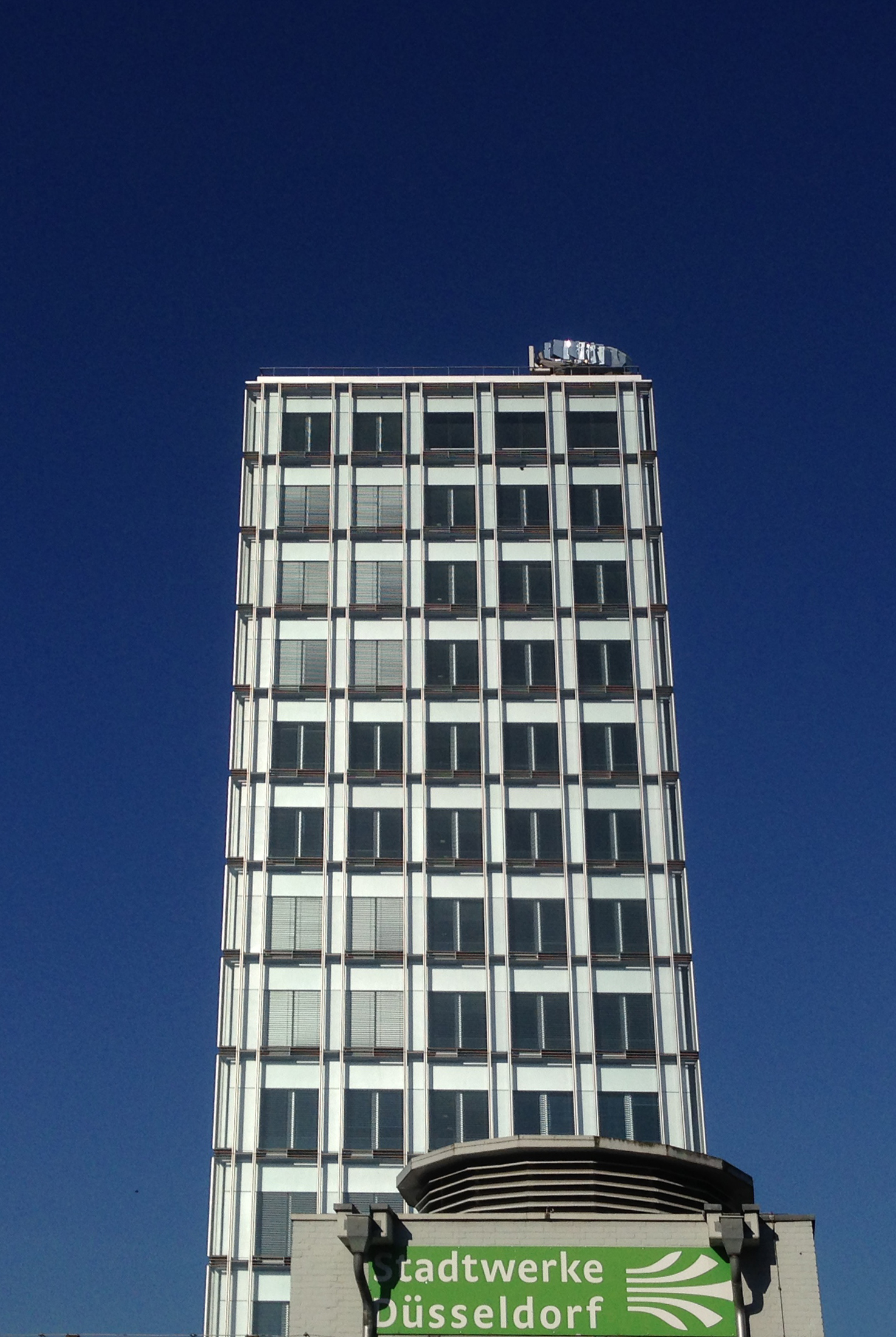
NRW.Bank Düsseldorf, view from the Reichsstraße

NRW.Bank (incorporated as NRW.BANK) is the promotional bank of the German state of North Rhine-Westphalia (NRW) based in Düsseldorf and Münster. It's an institution under public law. It is owned by the North Rhine-Westphalia state and supports its structural policy.

== Activities ==
NRW.Bank is the promotional bank for North Rhine-Westphalia, with a public mandate to support the state and its municipal authorities in fulfilling their responsibilities, particularly in the areas of structural, economic, social, and housing policy.

NRW.Bank primarily employs instruments such as promotional loans with favourable terms or long-term interest rate commitments, the provision of equity and mezzanine capital, risk-sharing with commercial banks, and advisory services. Beyond traditional banking activities, NRW.Bank also acts as a service provider for the state in the administration of grant funding. It operates on a market-neutral basis.

The bank provides most promotional loans through the Hausbankenverfahren (on-lending system) in partnership with banks and savings banks. Applicants apply via their house bank, which assesses creditworthiness, forwards the application, and disburses funds under favourable conditions, sometimes sharing the risk with the promotional bank.

NRW.Bank operates independently of the state budget, financing its promotional activities from its own revenues rather than from state funds.

=== Economy ===
In the field of economic development, NRW.Bank safeguards and strengthens the SME sector. It also provides support for business start-ups. Its programmes are aimed at small and medium-sized enterprises (SMEs), start-ups, scale-ups, self-employed individuals, and entrepreneurs, offering low-interest promotional loans for working capital and investments. These are complemented by mezzanine and equity financing for small and medium-sized businesses.

In particular, the bank supports transformation processes in areas such as digitalisation, sustainability, resource efficiency, and electric mobility. In addition to promotional loans and equity products, it also provides advice on public funding opportunities from other providers, including the state, federal government, and the EU.

=== Housing ===
NRW.Bank promotes housing and living environments in North Rhine-Westphalia. Its activities include supporting new residential construction, the modernisation of existing properties, and measures to enhance energy efficiency and achieve environmental and climate protection goals in residential real estate.

NRW.Bank complements the state's public housing promotion with its own promotional programmes aimed at private individuals looking to acquire, build, or modernise residential property.

=== Infrastructure and municipalities ===
NRW.Bank supports municipalities and municipal enterprises in North Rhine-Westphalia with low-interest, long-term loans and advisory services for implementing local infrastructure projects. These loans, granted directly, cover all areas of municipal infrastructure, with investments in areas such as climate protection and education benefiting from further reduced interest rates.

=== Refinancing ===
NRW.Bank refinances itself through the international capital market. In 2013, it became the first regional promotional bank in Germany to issue a Green Bond to refinance environmentally friendly projects in North Rhine-Westphalia. Since then, NRW.Bank has issued green bonds annually. In 2020, it also became the first German promotional bank to place a social bond with a volume of €1 billion.

== Governing bodies ==
According to Section 7 (1) of its statutes, the governing bodies of the bank are the managing board, the supervisory board, and the board of guarantors. While the managing board manages the bank, the supervisory board monitors its activities. The board of guarantors fulfils corporate governance functions similar to those of a general meeting in a public limited company.

== History ==
=== Background ===
The history of NRW.Bank began in 2001 with the Verständigung I agreement, in which the EU Commission and the German government decided to phase out state liability guarantees for German Landesbanken and savings banks by 2005 for competition law reasons, while preserving their public-law status. A subsequent agreement, Verständigung II, signed on 1 March 2002, introduced special regulations for legally independent promotional banks engaged in market-neutral promotional and structural development activities.

As a result, Westdeutsche Landesbank Girozentrale was split into the privately operated WestLB AG and the publicly owned Landesbank NRW, the predecessor of what later became NRW.Bank.

=== Creation of NRW.Bank and expansion of promotional programmes ===
On 31 March 2004, the North Rhine-Westphalian state parliament passed the law restructuring Landesbank NRW into the development bank for North Rhine-Westphalia. This officially granted the bank promotional bank status, ensuring the continued application of institutional liability and guarantor liability. The bank was also renamed NRW.Bank, under which it has operated ever since. Its headquarters have since been located in Münster and Düsseldorf.

From 2005, NRW.Bank expanded its products, developing additional promotional programmes for start-ups, SMEs, and municipalities. Following Cyclone Kyrill in 2007, it introduced emergency loans for the first time. In response to the 2008 financial crisis, the bank launched a telephone information service to help businesses select suitable promotional offerings. In autumn 2009, NRW.Bank moved into a new building in Münster.

In January 2010, the Housing Promotion Agency of North Rhine-Westphalia (Wohnungsbauförderungsanstalt Nordrhein-Westfalen, Wfa) was integrated into NRW.Bank as its housing promotion division. The bank assumed all tasks and responsibilities of the Wfa, inheriting its rights and obligations. The Wfa's assets remained with NRW.Bank and became part of its share capital.

In 2015, NRW.Bank was included in a European Central Bank list of European institutions and national agencies whose bonds would be eligible for the ECB to buy alongside sovereign debt.

On 1 January 2017, NRW.Bank, together with the state of North Rhine-Westphalia, launched the NRW.Bank.Gute Schule 2020 funding programme. Under this scheme, municipalities received €500 million annually over four years for school renovation, modernisation, and digitalisation projects. The state covered all repayment and interest costs, making the programme cost-free for municipalities.

In 2019, NRW.Bank moved into an office location in the former WestLB headquarters in Düsseldorf. In 2024, construction work began on a new building at the site of the former Ministry of the Interior in Düsseldorf.

=== Crisis aid and new developments ===
Since 2020, the bank has increasingly provided support measures for crisis situations. During the COVID-19 pandemic, it offered funding primarily for start-ups, businesses, and municipalities. Following the 2021 European floods, NRW.Bank introduced promotional programmes to help with flood damage recovery.

== Controversy ==
In April 2015, NRW.Bank filed a lawsuit against Austrian "bad bank" Heta Asset Resolution AG for failing to pay €275.5 million in bonds following the suspension of its debt, imposed by Austrian financial regulators. The North Rhine-Westphalia state government subsequently asked German finance minister Wolfgang Schäuble to intervene and "to do what is politically and legally possible so that contracts or commitments are met."

NRW.Bank attracted criticism for its use of Credit Default Swaps (CDS). NRW.Bank's CDS mainly relate to states with very good to good ratings, however, the risk of devaluation and consequently increasing losses remains. The North Rhine-Westphalia Constitutional Court ruled in 2011 that the North Rhine-Westphalia State Court of Audit may comprehensively audit the bank.

== See also ==
- German public banking sector
- List of banks in Germany
