= 2012 North Rhine-Westphalia state election =

State election in Germany

- 13 May 2012

All 237 seats in the Landtag of North Rhine-Westphalia, including 56 overhang and leveling seats 119 seats needed for a majority
- Turnout: 7,901,268 (59.6% ▲0.3 pp)
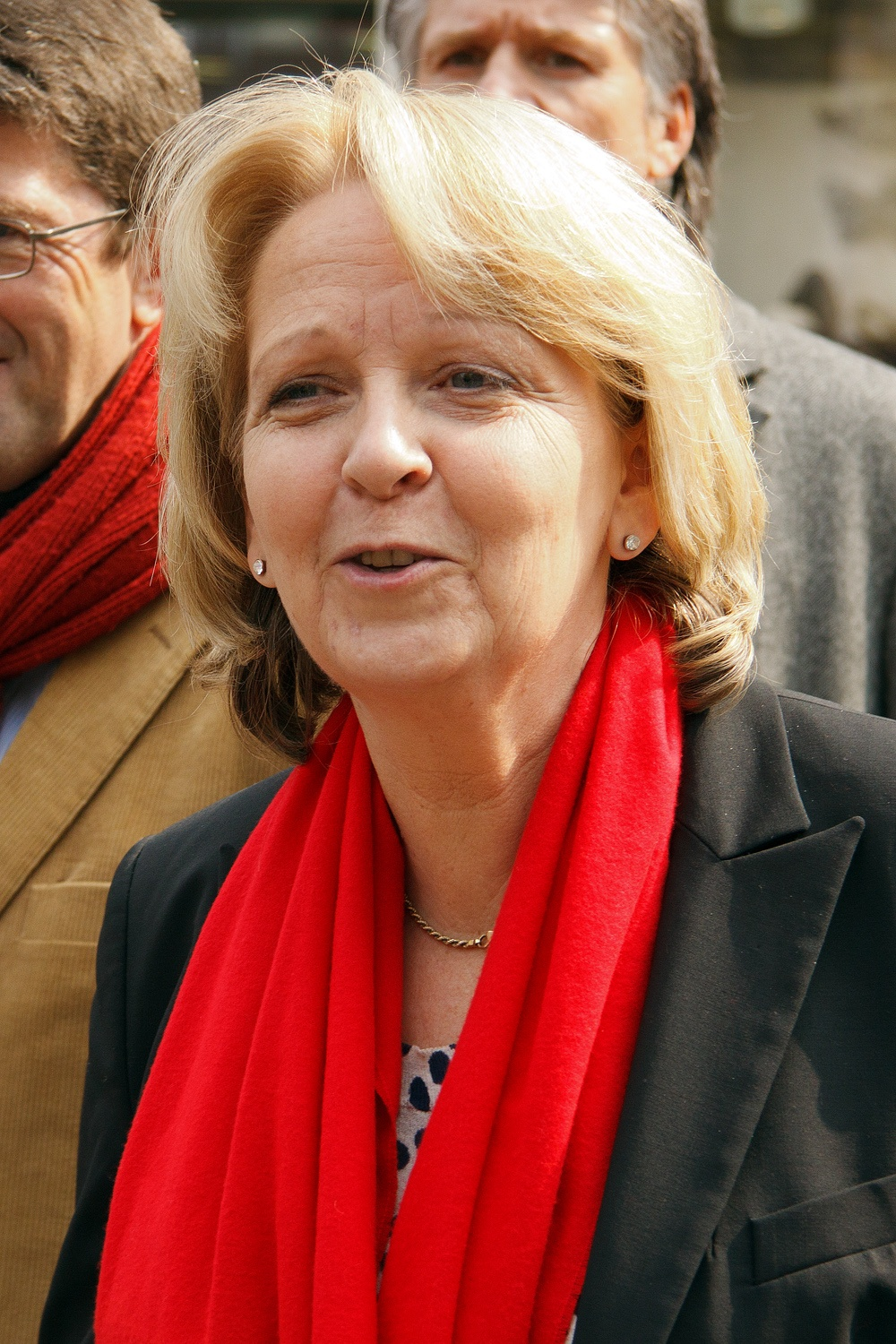

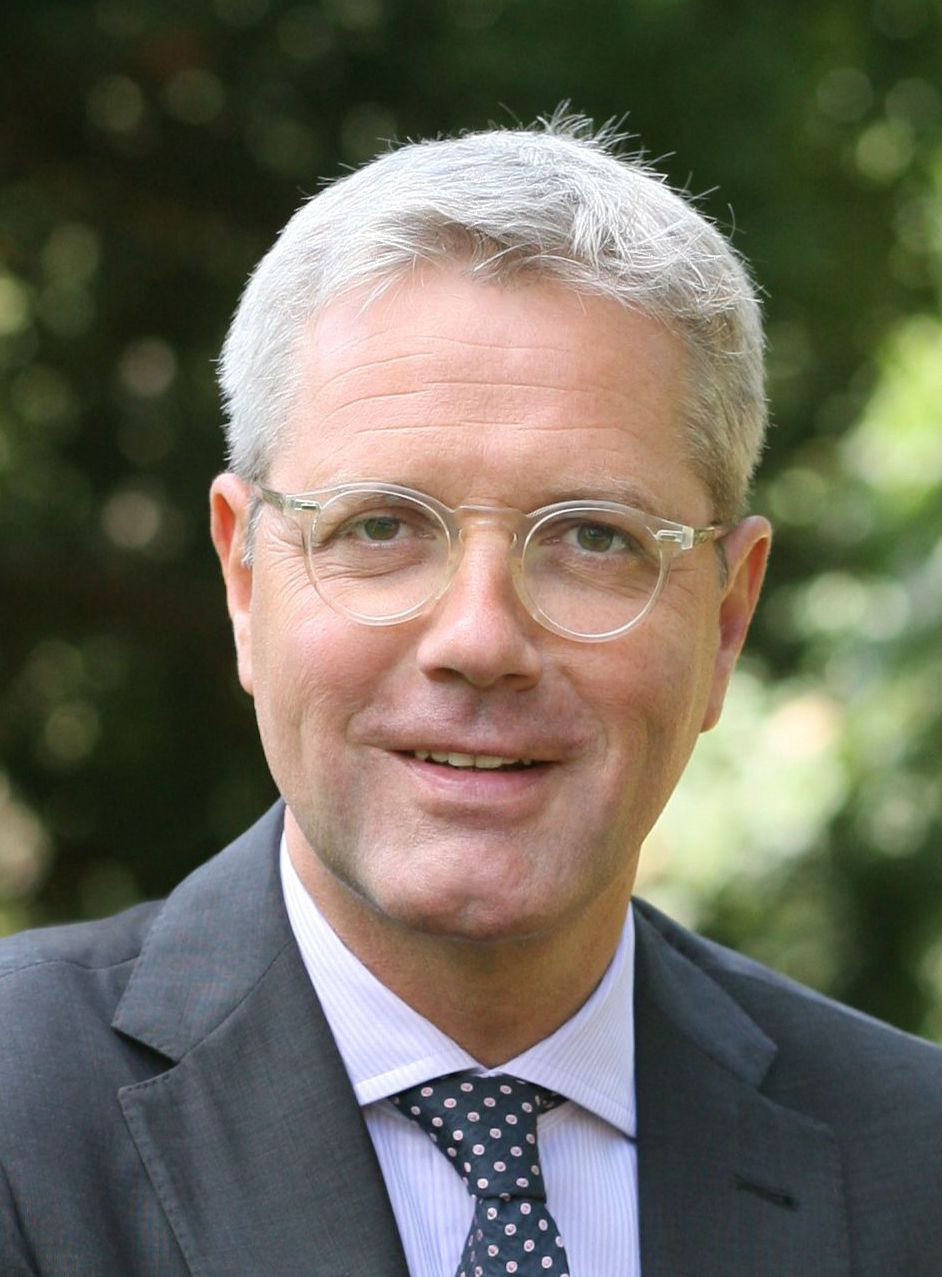

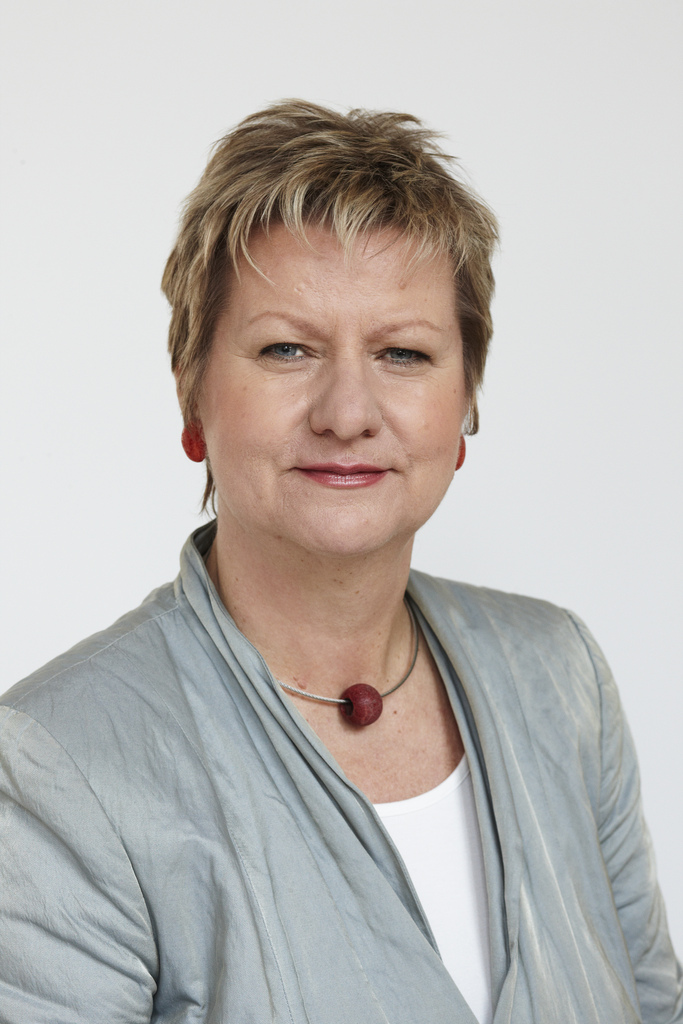

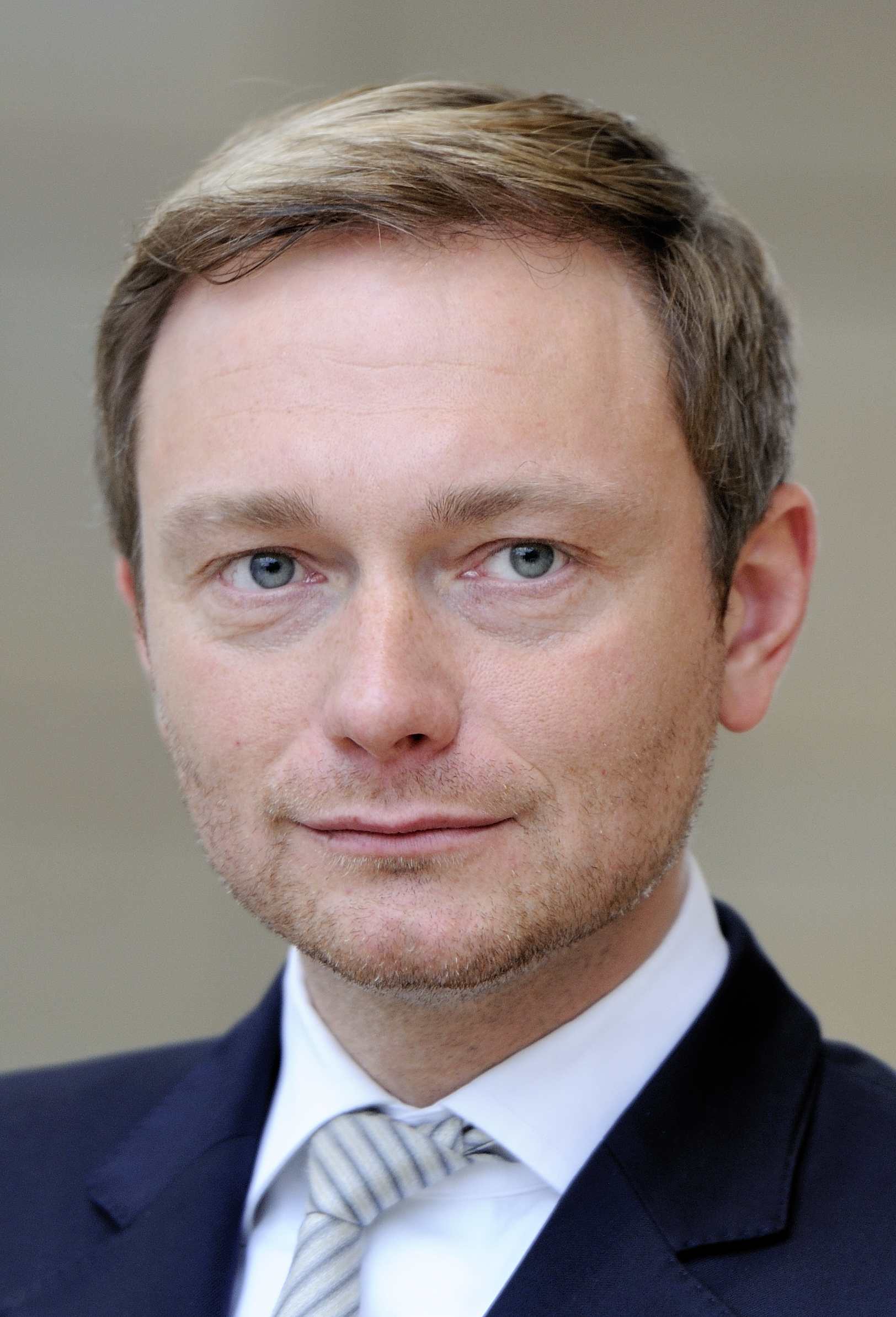

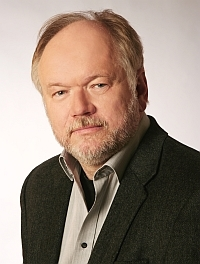

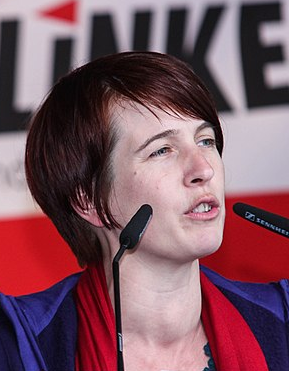
	First party	Second party	Third party
Candidate	Hannelore Kraft	Norbert Röttgen	Sylvia Löhrmann
Party	SPD	CDU	Greens
Last election	67 seats, 34.5%	67 seats, 34.6%	23 seats, 12.1%
Seats won	99	67	29
Seat change	▲32	0	▲6
Popular vote	3,049,983	2,050,321	884,298
Percentage	39.1%	26.3%	11.3%
Swing	▲4.6 pp	▼8.3 pp	▼0.8 pp
	Fourth party	Fifth party	Sixth party
Candidate	Christian Lindner	Joachim Paul	Katharina Schwabedissen
Party	FDP	Pirates	Left
Last election	13 seats, 6.7%	0 seats, 1.6%	11 seats, 5.6%
Seats won	22	20	0
Seat change	▲9	▲20	▼11
Popular vote	670,082	609,176	194,428
Percentage	8.6%	7.8%	2.5%
Swing	▲1.9 pp	▲6.2 pp	▼3.1 pp
- Results for the single-member constituencies
Government before election
First Kraft cabinet
SPD–Green
Government after election
Second Kraft cabinet
SPD–Green

The 2012 North Rhine-Westphalia state election was held on 13 May 2012 to elect the members of the Landtag of North Rhine-Westphalia. The incumbent minority government of the Social Democratic Party (SPD) and The Greens led by Minister-President Hannelore Kraft was returned with a majority and continued in office. The seat count drastically increased from 181 in the previous election to 237.

== Background ==
Germany's largest state has often been described as a bellwether in recent years. The SPD governed continuously from 1966 until a CDU–FDP coalition took control in the 2005 state election. This defeat led Chancellor Gerhard Schröder to call a federal election, which he lost.

In the 2010 state election, the CDU held a 0.1% lead over the SPD, though both parties won 67 seats. The SPD and Greens emerged one seat short of a majority, while the CDU and FDP were 10 seats short. This was due to the new presence of The Left. After failed negotiations with The Left, the SPD and Greens formed a minority government with SPD leader Hannelore Kraft as Minister-President. The state budget was rejected by the Landtag on 14 March 2012. The government expected the FDP to abstain from the vote, allowing it to pass. However, the CDU, FDP, and Left all voted against the budget, and it was rejected. This led to the dissolution of the Landtag and a snap election.

== Campaign and issues ==
The SPD and Greens sought to win a majority; polls predicted they would make gains. The CDU nominated federal Environment Minister Norbert Röttgen as their lead candidate. He was criticised for refusing to state whether, if the CDU lost the election, he would continue to lead the state party or return to federal politics. Opinion polls showed that voters preferred Kraft as Minister-President by a wide margin. The CDU made tackling the state's €230 billion debt a key issue; at one point they used a giant inflatable "debt mountain" as a prop.

The FDP had fallen out of six state elections since joining the federal government in 2009, but had managed to retain their seats with 8.2% of the vote in the Schleswig-Holstein state election a week before the North Rhine-Westphalia election.

The Pirate Party ran on a loose platform of Internet freedom and grassroots democracy.

== Parties ==
The table below lists parties represented in the previous Landtag of North Rhine-Westphalia.

Name		Ideology	Leader(s)	2010 result	
Name		Ideology	Leader(s)	Votes (%)	Seats
CDU	Christian Democratic Union of Germany; Christlich Demokratische Union Deutschlands	Christian democracy	Norbert Röttgen	34.6%	67 / 181
SPD	Social Democratic Party of Germany; Sozialdemokratische Partei Deutschlands	Social democracy	Hannelore Kraft	34.5%	67 / 181
Grüne	Alliance 90/The Greens; Bündnis 90/Die Grünen	Green politics	Sylvia Löhrmann	12.1%	23 / 181
FDP	Free Democratic Party; Freie Demokratische Partei	Classical liberalism	Christian Lindner	6.7%	13 / 181
Linke	The Left; Die Linke	Democratic socialism	Katharina Schwabedissen	5.6%	11 / 181

== Opinion polling ==
=== Party polling ===
Polling firm	Fieldwork date	Sample size	CDU	SPD	Grüne	FDP	Linke	Piraten	Others	Lead
2012 state election	13 May 2012	–	26.3	39.1	11.3	8.6	2.5	7.8	4.3	12.8
INFO GmbH	3–5 May 2012	1,007	33	38	11	5	4	8	1	5
YouGov	27 Apr–7 May 2012	1,063	30	37	12	6	3.5	8.5	3	7
YouGov	24 Apr–4 May 2012	1,053	31	37	11	5	4	9	3	6
Forschungsgruppe Wahlen	30 Apr–3 May 2012	1,082	31	38	11	6	3	8	3	7
Infratest dimap	1–3 May 2012	1,003	30	38.5	11	6	4	7.5	3	8.5
YouGov	20–29 Apr 2012	1,038	31	36	11	5	4	10	3	5
Forsa	23–27 Apr 2012	1,008	32	37	10	5	3	10	3	5
Emnid	23–24 Apr 2012	1,001	32	38	10	5	4	9	?	6
Infratest dimap	17–19 Apr 2012	1,001	31	39	11	4	3	9	3	8
Forschungsgruppe Wahlen	17–19 Apr 2012	1,045	34	37	11	4	3	8	3	3
YouGov	5–16 Apr 2012	1,064	32	36	13	4	4	8	3	4
INFO GmbH	4–7 Apr 2012	1,005	29	40	10	3	3	11	3	11
Infratest dimap	22–24 Mar 2012	1,001	32	40	12	4	3	5	4	8
Forsa	15–17 Mar 2012	1,003	33	39	11	4	4	6	3	6
Forschungsgruppe Wahlen	14–15 Mar 2012	1,073	34	37	13	2	4	6	4	3
Infratest dimap	14 Mar 2012	1,002	34	38	14	2	4	5	3	4
	14 Mar 2012	State budget is rejected by the Landtag; snap election is called								
YouGov	2–12 Mar 2012	1,065	33	33	17	2	5	7	3	Tie
Infratest dimap	22–23 Feb 2012	1,004	35	35	17	2	3	5	3	Tie
YouGov	27 Jan–6 Feb 2012	1,018	31	33	15	3	6	7	5	2
YouGov	6–16 Jan 2012	1,039	31	33	17	3	5	8	3	2
YouGov	14–21 Dec 2011	1,005	31	34	15	4	6	7	3	3
YouGov	2–12 Dec 2011	1,026	31	34	15	4	6	7	3	3
YouGov	28 Oct–7 Nov 2011	1,042	30	31	18	3	5	9	4	1
Infratest dimap	11–13 Oct 2011	1,000	31	35	16	3	4	7	4	4
YouGov	October 2011	1,000	30	32	17	4	5	8	4	2
YouGov	8–15 Sep 2011	982	33	33	17	6	5	–	6	Tie
Emnid	29 Jul–4 Aug 2011	1,063	32	34	20	5	5	–	4	2
Forsa	1–7 Jul 2011	1,004	32	33	21	3	4	–	7	1
Infratest dimap	29–31 Mar 2011	1,000	34	30	24	4	4	2	2	4
Emnid	4–10 Mar 2011	1,000	35	35	14	5	5	–	6	Tie
Forsa	18–28 Jan 2011	1,008	35	34	17	4	4	–	6	1
Emnid	19–25 Jan 2011	635	36	36	15	4	4	–	5	Tie
YouGov	20–24 Jan 2011	1,029	24.7	30.6	14.1	5.5	8.6	1.3	15.2	5.9
Infratest dimap	16–18 Dec 2010	1,000	32	36	18	4	5	–	5	4
Forsa	11–15 Oct 2010	1,002	31	35	19	3	5	–	7	4
Infratest dimap	6–8 Jul 2010	1,001	32	36	17	5	6	–	4	4
Emnid	25 Jun 2010	?	35	36	12	6	7	–	4	1
Emnid	17–26 May 2010	1,001	34	35	12	6	7	–	6	1
2010 state election	9 May 2010	–	34.6	34.5	12.1	6.7	5.6	1.6	4.9	0.1

=== Seat forecast ===
Analysts on election.de forecast the likely results of the 128 direct mandates. These seats traditionally have been held by either the CDU or SPD, with minor parties standing little chance of winning any.

Polling firm	Fieldwork date	CDU	SPD	Lead
2012 state election	13 May 2012	29	99	70
election.de	12 May 2012	39	89	50
election.de	5 May 2012	38	90	52
election.de	28 Apr 2012	41	87	46
election.de	21 Apr 2012	54	74	20
election.de	14 Apr 2012	39	89	50
election.de	7 Apr 2012	46	82	36
2010 state election	9 May 2010	67	61	8

=== Minister-President polling ===
Polling firm	Fieldwork date			Lead
Polling firm	Fieldwork date	Hannelore Kraft SPD	Norbert Röttgen CDU	Lead
INFO GmbH	11 May 2012	53	22	31
YouGov	7 May 2012	46	19	27
Forschungsgruppe Wahlen	4 May 2012	63	27	36
Infratest dimap	3 May 2012	58	26	32
Forsa	2 May 2012	56	25	31
Infratest dimap	22 Apr 2012	58	30	28
Forschungsgruppe Wahlen	20 Apr 2012	55	32	23
INFO GmbH	14 Apr 2012	49	21	28
Infratest dimap	25 Mar 2012	57	28	29
Forsa	21 Mar 2012	56	26	30
Forschungsgruppe Wahlen	15 Mar 2012	54	30	24
Infratest dimap	14 Mar 2012	57	26	31
YouGov	14 Mar 2012	42	21	21
Infratest dimap	26 Feb 2012	51	29	22
YouGov	19 Jan 2012	36	17	19

== Election result ==
There was a major swing from the CDU to the SPD and to the Pirates, who entered their fourth state parliament in a row. The Greens stayed essentially level, while the FDP bucked the national trend, achieving a 2-point swing in their favour. This was attributed to the popular leadership of Christian Lindner. Lindner was elected FDP federal leader one year later, after their historic defeat in the 2013 German federal election. The Left lost over half their voteshare and lost their seats after just two years in the Landtag.

The SPD won a landslide in the direct mandates, winning 99 seats to the CDU's 29. This led to a large number of overhang seats for the SPD and leveling seats for other parties, increasing the size of the Landtag from 181 to 237 seats.

State CDU leader Norbert Röttgen resigned, but refused to become leader of the opposition in the Landtag of North Rhine-Westphalia, instead continuing to serve as Minister for the Environment. Because of that, in what was considered unceremonious and highly unusual move (ministers are normally given the courtesy of resigning by themselves even after scandals), Chancellor Merkel fired him under Article 64 of the German Basic Law three days after the election.

Graph of the party split among 237 seats.
Party	Constituency				Party list				Total seats	+/–
Party	Votes	%	+/–	Seats	Votes	%	+/–	Seats	Total seats	+/–
Social Democratic Party (SPD)	3,290,561	42.29	+3.79	99	3,049,983	39.13	+4.65	0	99	+32
Christian Democratic Union (CDU)	2,545,309	32.71	–5.83	29	2,050,321	26.31	–8.25	38	67	±0
Alliance 90/The Greens (GRÜNE)	723,581	9.30	–0.84	0	884,298	11.35	–0.78	29	29	+6
Free Democratic Party (FDP)	372,727	4.79	+0.09	0	670,082	8.60	+1.87	22	22	+9
Pirate Party Germany (Piraten)	617,926	7.94	+7.03	0	609,176	7.82	+6.26	20	20	+20
The Left (LINKE)	201,637	2.59	–2.77	0	194,428	2.49	–3.12	0	0	–11
Citizens' Movement pro NRW (Pro NRW)					118,326	1.52	+0.14	0	0	±0
Human Environment Animal Protection Party (Tierschutzpartei)					58,091	0.75	+0.13	0	0	±0
National Democratic Party (NPD)					40,007	0.51	–0.20	0	0	±0
Family Party of Germany (FAMILIE)	1,722	0.02	–0.09	0	33,793	0.43	+0.02	0	0	±0
Die PARTEI	6,362	0.08	+0.07	0	22,915	0.29	+0.17	0	0	±0
Free Voters (FW)	10,600	0.14	New	0	17,970	0.23	New	0	0	New
Alliance for Innovation and Justice (BIG)					10,694	0.14	–0.04	0	0	±0
Party for Labour, Environment and Family (AUF)	2,726	0.04	+0.01	0	10,217	0.13	+0.06	0	0	±0
Free Citizens Initiative/Free Voters (FBI)	1,538	0.02	+0.01	0	9,496	0.12	+0.03	0	0	±0
Ecological Democratic Party (ÖDP)	1,336	0.02	–0.02	0	7,842	0.10	±0.00	0	0	±0
Party of Reason (Vernunft)					6,356	0.08	New	0	0	New
From now – Alliance for Germany	1,087	0.01	–0.01	0					0	±0
Pensioners' Party (RRP)	418	0.01	–0.08	0					0	±0
Civil Rights Movement Solidarity (BüSo)	272	0.00	–0.09	0					0	±0
Liberal Democrats (LD)	120	0.00	±0.00	0					0	±0
League for All-Germany (BGD)	83	0.00	±0.00	0					0	±0
Independents	2,605	0.03	±0.00	0					0	±0
Total	7,780,610	100.00	–	128	7,793,995	100.00	–	109	237	+56
Valid votes	7,780,610	98.47			7,793,995	98.64				
Invalid/blank votes	120,658	1.53			107,273	1.36				
Total votes	7,901,268	100.00			7,901,268	100.00				
Registered voters/turnout	13,262,049	59.58			13,262,049	59.58				
