= Hannelore Kraft =

German politician (born 1961)

Hannelore Kraft MdL MdBR a. D.
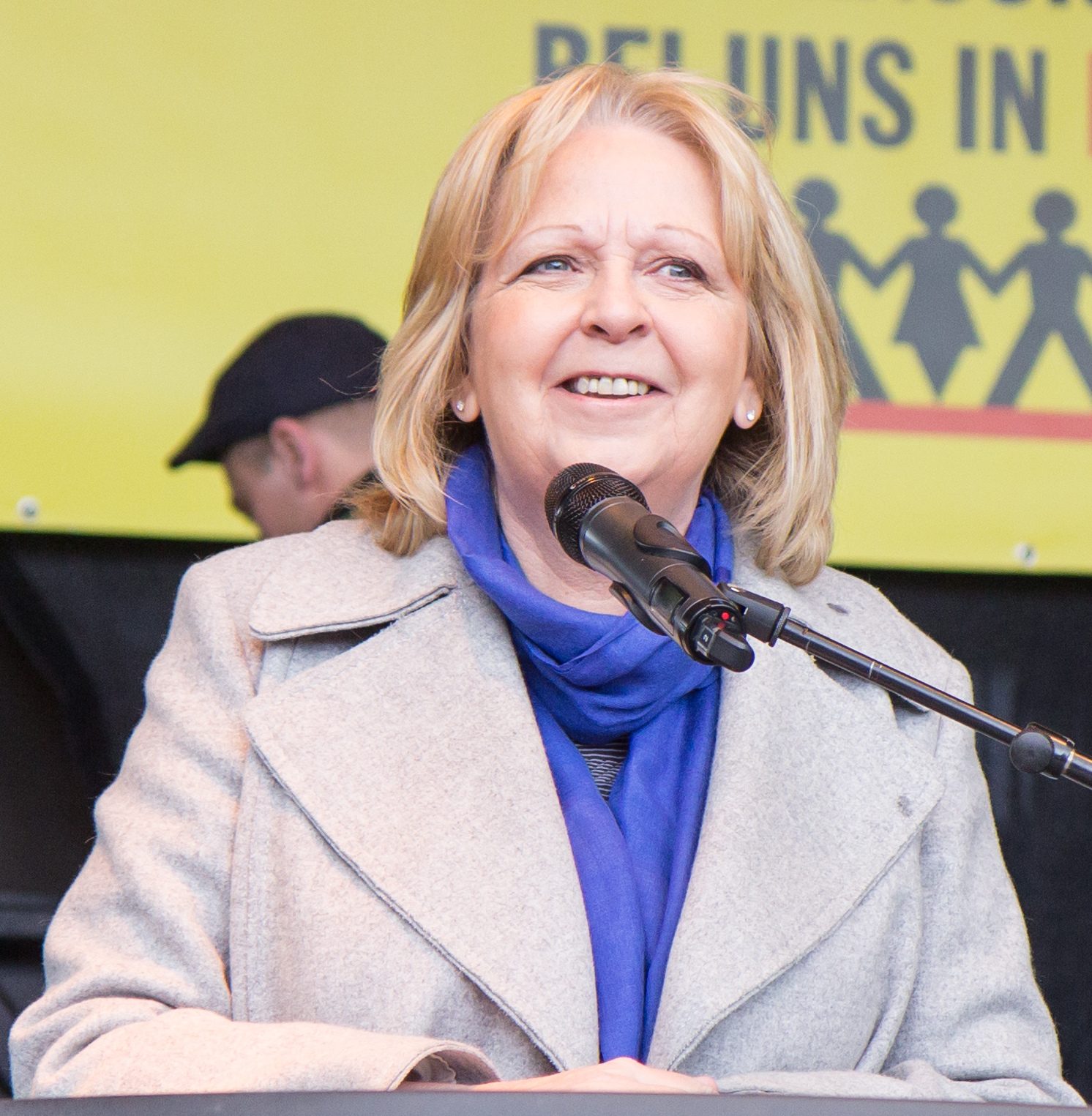
- Kraft in 2017

Minister-President of North Rhine-Westphalia
- In office 14 July 2010 – 27 June 2017
- Deputy: Sylvia Löhrmann
- Preceded by: Jürgen Rüttgers
- Succeeded by: Armin Laschet

President of the Bundesrat
- In office 1 November 2010 – 31 October 2011
- Deputy: Jens Böhrnsen
- Preceded by: Jens Böhrnsen
- Succeeded by: Horst Seehofer

Leader of the Social Democratic Party in North Rhine-Westphalia
- In office 20 January 2007 – 14 May 2017
- Deputy: Marc Herter; Elvan Korkmaz
- Preceded by: Jochen Dieckmann
- Succeeded by: Michael Groschek

Deputy Leader of the Social Democratic Party
- In office 13 November 2009 – 14 May 2017
- Leader: Sigmar Gabriel; Martin Schulz
- Preceded by: Andrea Nahles
- Succeeded by: Natascha Kohnen

Minister of Science and Research of North Rhine-Westphalia
- In office 12 November 2002 – 31 May 2005
- Minister-President: Peer Steinbrück
- Preceded by: Gabriele Behler
- Succeeded by: Andreas Pinkwart

Minister of Federal and European Affairs of North Rhine-Westphalia
- In office 24 April 2001 – 12 November 2002
- Minister-President: Wolfgang Clement
- Preceded by: Detlev Samland
- Succeeded by: Wolfram Kuschke

Member of the Landtag of North Rhine-Westphalia for Mülheim I (Mülheim an der Ruhr II – Essen VII; 2000–2005)
- In office 1 June 2000 – 31 May 2022
- Preceded by: Constituency established
- Succeeded by: Rodion Bakum

Personal details
- Born: Hannelore Külzhammer; 12 June 1961 (age 65) Mülheim an der Ruhr, West Germany
- Party: Social Democratic Party
- Education: Comprehensive University of Duisburg

Hannelore Kraft (née Külzhammer, 12 June 1961) is a German politician. She served as the Minister-President of North Rhine-Westphalia from 2010 until 2017. Kraft was the first woman to serve as head of government of this state and was the third woman to become head of a state government in Germany. Between 1 November 2010 and 31 October 2011, she was the President of the Bundesrat, again the first woman to hold the office. She is the former leader of the SPD North Rhine-Westphalia and served on the SPD's federal executive from November 2009 until May 2017, and was one of the four federal deputy chairs.

== Early life and education ==
The daughter of a streetcar driver and a ticket collector, Kraft graduated in 1980, and first trained as a bank clerk with Dresdner Bank. She commenced her studies in economics at Comprehensive University of Duisburg in 1982, and studied at King's College London in 1986 and 1987. She completed her studies in Duisburg in 1989.

== Career ==
=== Early career ===
From 1989 until 2001, Kraft was a consultant and project manager at ZENIT GmbH ('Centre for Innovation and Technology') in Mülheim an der Ruhr, and was head of the local European Info Centre.

=== Political career ===
Kraft joined the SPD in 1994. She was drawn to politics after becoming head of a works council and struggling to find a place for her son in a nursery. At the 2000 North Rhine-Westphalia state election, she was elected to the Landtag of North Rhine-Westphalia. Initially representing electoral district 74 (Mülheim II-Essen VII), she switched to electoral district 64 (Mülheim I) for the election in 2005.

On 24 April 2001, she replaced Detlev Samland as Minister for Federal and European Affairs, and then under Minister-President Peer Steinbrück, served from 12 November 2002 until 31 May 2005 as Minister for Science and Research.

Kraft was a SPD delegate to the Federal Convention for the purpose of electing the President of Germany in 2004, 2009, 2010 and 2012.

==== Chairwoman of the SPD Parliamentary Group in North Rhine-Wesphalia, 2005-2010 ====
After the SPD lost the 2005 state election in North Rhine-Westphalia, Kraft was elected leader of the SPD's parliamentary group with 95.7% of the votes, hence becoming the Opposition Leader in the state. In 2007, she was elected chairperson of the SPD in North Rhine-Westphalia.

On 13 November 2009, Kraft was elected as one of the four vice chairs of the federal SPD under chairman Sigmar Gabriel, receiving the highest overall vote. A party congress in February 2010 affirmed that she was the SPD's candidate for Minister-President at the May 2010 state election.

==== First term as Minister President, 2010-12 ====
The state election on 9 May 2010 resulted in a near-tie with the governing CDU at 67 seats, and with Kraft's preferred red-green coalition one seat short of an overall majority; at the time, the federal government under Chancellor Angela Merkel blamed the result on voter anger at the first aid package for Greece.

After many parallel negotiations and various coalitions, Kraft was elected Minister-President of North Rhine-Westphalia on 14 July 2010 on the second ballot with a sufficient majority of votes, coming from the SPD and Alliance 90/The Greens, while the Left Party abstained. Kraft formed a minority government with ministers of Social Democrats and Greens. It was the first time in Germany that a coalition has attempted to rule one of the 16 federal states without a proper majority, with the only exception being a red–green alliance governing Berlin for some months in 2001–2002 without a majority. For nearly two years, Kraft ruled the state without a regular majority, pulling votes for each initiative from opposition parties on the right or the left. Together with the deputy governor, Sylvia Löhrmann from the Green Party, Kraft dubbed her government the "invitation coalition".

After decades of ideological rivalry in the state over the structure of secondary schools, both Kraft and Löhrmann later succeeded in negotiating a cross-party agreement with the centre-right Christian Democratic Union that is to ensure peace until 2023.

Kraft got attention for a eulogy she gave after a stampede killed 21 people at the Love Parade music festival in July 2010, less than two weeks after she became state premier. When she gave her speech at a memorial ceremony, she spoke of the hours she spent waiting to hear from her son, who was at the event, unsure if he was injured or unharmed, alive or dead.

In October 2010, Kraft was elected President of the Bundesrat, according to the customary rotation of the presidency between the Bundesländer. She assumed office on 1 November 2010, becoming the first female office holder, remaining in office until 31 October 2011.

At an SPD convention in Berlin in December 2011, Kraft was confirmed in her vice-chairmanship by 97 percent of party members, the best result for a board member.

Krafts failure to get her 2012 budget plans passed after a court ruled a supplementary budget for 2010 unconstitutional forced her to call an early election and left her exposed to charges of fiscal incompetence. Kraft had hoped to win backing from the opposition FDP for the budget but their long-standing objections were not overcome in time for the vote.

==== Second term as Minister President, 2012-2017 ====
The resulting election saw the SPD-Green coalition win a nine-seat majority and allowed Kraft to remain in office. Cabinet Kraft II is quite similar to Cabinet Kraft I.

Soon after the May 2012 elections, Kraft placed third in a Der Spiegel poll among German politicians right after Chancellor Angela Merkel and the new federal president, Joachim Gauck, and ahead of any other politician in the SPD including Frank-Walter Steinmeier, who lost to Merkel in 2009, and party chairman Sigmar Gabriel. This vaulted Kraft into the top rank of German politicians, prompting speculation that she might be the strongest contender to lead the party against Merkel and potentially succeed her as chancellor. However, she soon announced that she did not want to become the SPD's candidate for chancellor, preferring instead to stay in her home state for the five-year term she had just won.

In 2013, Kraft initially opposed national SPD leaders who opted to join Merkel as junior partner for the second time. However, she subsequently was part of the SPD team led by Sigmar Gabriel, which led the negotiations towards forming a new German government with Chancellor Angela Merkel's CDU/CSU bloc. She headed the SPD's delegation in the energy working group and vocally defended the coal industry, which has a sizeable presence in her state; her co-chair from the CDU/CSU was Peter Altmaier.

In 2014, Kraft's government plans record spending of 62 billion euros ($85 billion) while trimming the deficit by a quarter to 2.4 billion euros. At the same time, she has repeatedly criticized Merkel's austerity policies during the debt crisis.

In March 2014, Kraft hosted Chinese President Xi Jinping in Duisburg as he visited the last stop on the Yuxinou Railway between Europe and Asia.

Following her party's loss in the 2017 state elections, Kraft remained a member of the State Parliament where she currently serves on the Committee on Sports. She also joined the supervisory board of RAG AG. In 2019, her official portrait – a photograph made by Jim Rakete – was unveiled to the public. In 2020, she announced her intention not to run again in the 2022 state elections.

== Political positions ==
=== Energy ===
In 2012, Kraft placed investment in renewable energy at the center of her second term's agenda, stating that more than 30 per cent of electricity in NRW should be coming from renewable sources by 2025. In 2013, Kraft called on Angela Merkel to use tax revenue to cut electricity costs for consumers by 25 percent. On energy companies extracting oil and natural gas by the controversial practice of hydraulic fracturing, or fracking, Kraft stated in 2014 that "[a]s long as I am governor in North Rhine-Westphalia, there will be no fracking for unconventional natural gas." She also helped get a resolution through the Bundesrat on tighter rules for fracking, after visiting Canada to get a first-hand look at shale oil extraction there.

=== Tax evasion ===
Early in her time in office, Kraft focused on tax evasion, which is a policy that is not exclusively the reserve of the federal government and thus allowed to her to both exercise her power in her state as well as in the Bundesrat, the upper house of the federal parliament, where the states are presented and the opposition had a majority at the time. In 2013, Kraft led the Bundesrat opposition to a tax agreement with Switzerland, eventually blocking it as too easy on tax dodgers. Under the proposed law, Germans with untaxed wealth in Switzerland would have been able to legitimize their holdings and retain their anonymity in exchange for paying a one-off penalty charge and submitting to a future withholding tax.

=== Art ===
In 2013, the heir of a prominent Jewish art dealer Alfred Flechtheim, who fled Nazi Germany, urged the state of North Rhine-Westphalia to relinquish paintings by Paul Klee and Juan Gris that he says were lost due to Nazi persecution; Kraft declined to comment. In 2014, Kraft rejected demands made by museum directors in North Rhine-Westphalia who sought to prevent the sale of two Andy Warhol paintings, Triple Elvis (1963) and Four Marlons (1966), by the former West LB at Christie's New York; in a letter in response to the museum directors, she held that she could not stop the sale because the paintings were not considered items of national cultural importance.

=== Immigration ===
In summer 2015, when Chancellor Angela Merkel allowed tens of thousands of asylum seekers camped out in Hungary to travel to Germany, Kraft asserted that this had sent a signal to thousands of migrants to head straight for Germany; at the time, North Rhine-Westphalia was taking in around a fifth of the new arrivals.

=== Relations with France ===
Alongside Senator Catherine Troendle, Kraft served as co-chairwoman of the German-French Friendship Group set up by the German Bundesrat and the French Senate.

With 2014 marking the centenary of the start of World War I, Kraft inaugurated a memorial for the Armistice Day in Ablain-Saint-Nazaire alongside French President François Hollande and German Defense Minister Ursula von der Leyen, as well as British and Belgian officials.

On 26 March 2015, Kraft joined Merkel, Hollande and Prime Minister Mariano Rajoy of Spain at the crash site of Germanwings Flight 9525 in the Massif des Trois-Évêchés for a memorial; North Rhine-Westphalia was the state where the plane was headed and many of the 144 passengers lived. One day later, she and Germany's President Joachim Gauck attended a memorial service in the western town of Haltern for 16 students and two teachers from the local high school who were killed in the crash.

== Additional affiliations and memberships ==
=== Corporate boards ===
- RAG AG, Member of the supervisory board (since 2017)

=== Non-profit organizations ===
- Stiftung Duisburg 24.7.2017, Member of the Board of Trustees (since 2018)
- Heinz Kühn Foundation, chairwoman of the Board of Trustees
- Alfried Krupp von Bohlen und Halbach Foundation, Member of the Board
- Deutsches Museum, Member of the Board
- Friedrich Ebert Foundation, Member of the Board
- German Children and Youth Foundation (DKJS), Member of the Board
- North Rhine-Westphalian Academy of Sciences, Humanities and the Arts, Member of the Board
- IG Metall, Member (since 1995)
- Charlemagne Prize Foundation, Member of the Board (2010–2017)
- North Rhine-Westphalian Foundation for the Environment and Development, chairwoman of the Board (2010–2017)
- Kunstsammlung Nordrhein-Westfalen, chairwoman of the Board of Trustees (2010–2017)
- Kunststiftung NRW, chairwoman of the Board of Trustees (2010–2017)
- Development and Peace Foundation (SEF), chairwoman of the Board of Trustees (2010–2017)

== Awards ==
Throughout her political career, Hannelore Kraft has received several distinctions in recognition of her public service and contributions to social welfare. In 2007, she was awarded the Ehrenring des Rheinlandes (Rhineland Ring of Honor), followed in 2010 by the Order of Merit of North Rhine-Westphalia, the highest award granted by her home state. Her commitment to social justice and the welfare state was further acknowledged in 2012 when she received the Marie-Juchacz-Plakette, the most prestigious honor bestowed by the Arbeiterwohlfahrt for social engagement. In 2018, following her tenure as Minister-President, Hannelore Kraft was decorated with the Great Cross with Star and Sash of the Order of Merit of the Federal Republic of Germany, marking a significant recognition of her service at the federal level.

== Personal life ==
Kraft is married and has one son. The couple celebrated their church wedding in Namibia in October 2012. Kraft was formerly a Catholic but later converted to Protestantism, joining the Evangelical Church in the Rhineland, a member church of the Evangelical Church in Germany.

Political offices
Preceded by Jürgen Rüttgers	Minister-President of North Rhine-Westphalia; 2010 — 2017	Succeeded by Armin Laschet
