= First Wüst cabinet =

State government of North Rhine-Westphalia

First Cabinet of Hendrik Wüst Cabinet Wüst I
- 25th Cabinet of North Rhine-Westphalia
- 28 October 2021 – 28 June 2022
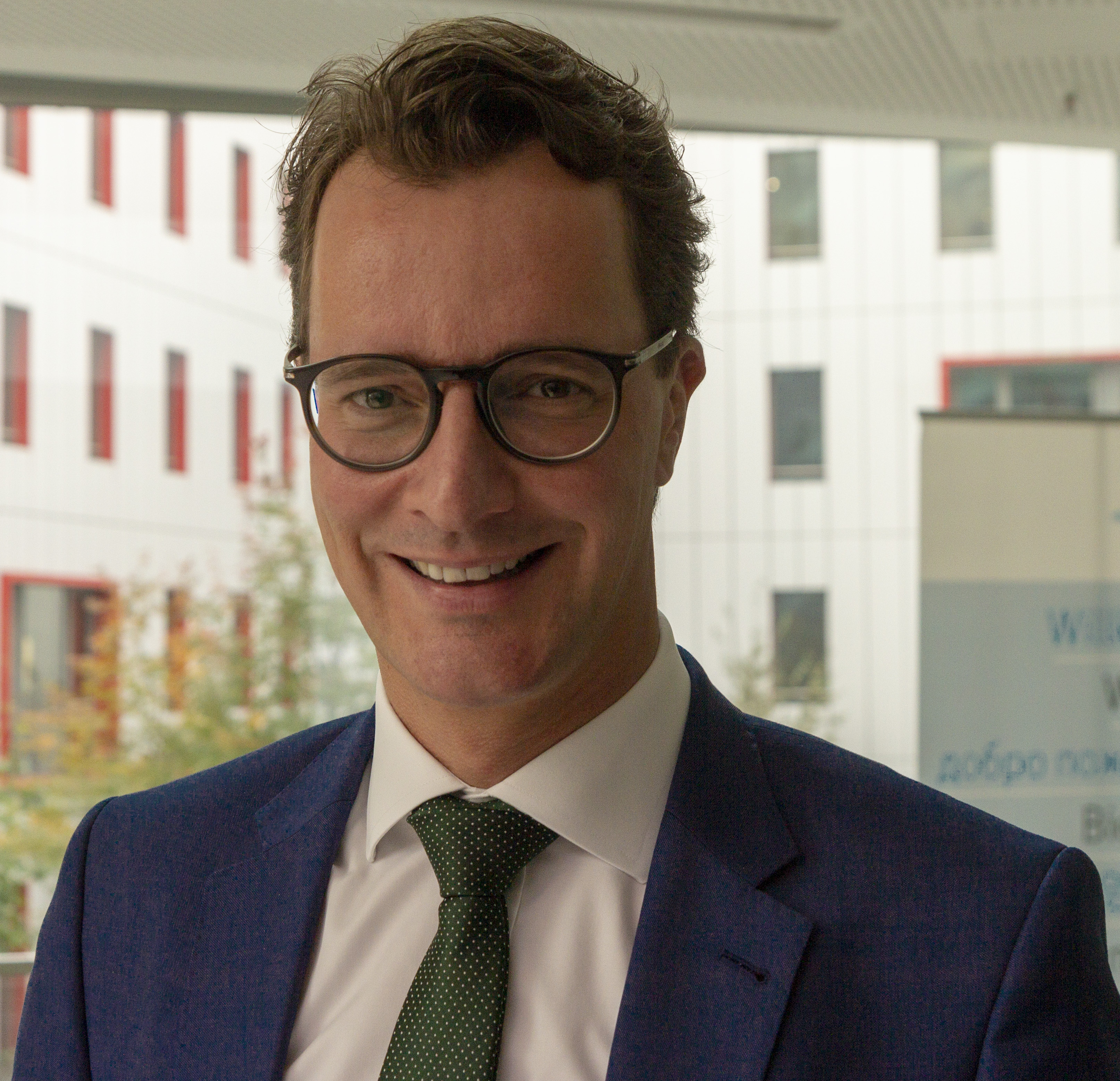
- Hendrik Wüst at the Conference of Transport Ministers in Frankfurt am Main in October 2019
- Date formed: 28 October 2021
- Date dissolved: 28 June 2022

People and organisations
- Minister-President: Hendrik Wüst
- Deputy Minister-President: Joachim Stamp
- No. of ministers: 12
- Member parties: Christian Democratic Union; Free Democratic Party
- Status in legislature: Coalition government (Majority)
- Opposition parties: Social Democratic Party; Alliance 90/The Greens; Alternative for Germany

History
- Election: None
- Legislature term: 17th Landtag of North Rhine-Westphalia
- Predecessor: Laschet cabinet
- Successor: Second Wüst cabinet

The first Wüst cabinet was the state government of North Rhine-Westphalia between 2021 and 2022, sworn in on 28 October 2021 after Hendrik Wüst was elected as Minister-President of North Rhine-Westphalia by the members of the Landtag of North Rhine-Westphalia. It was the 25th Cabinet of North Rhine-Westphalia.

It was formed after the resignation of Minister-President Armin Laschet, and was a continuation of the coalition government of the Christian Democratic Union (CDU) and Free Democratic Party (FDP) formed after the 2017 North Rhine-Westphalia state election. Excluding the Minister-President, the cabinet comprised twelve ministers. Eight were members of the CDU, three were members of the FDP, and one was an independent politician.

The first Wüst cabinet was succeeded by the second Wüst cabinet on 29 June 2022.

== Formation ==
The previous cabinet was a coalition government of the CDU and FDP led by Minister-President Armin Laschet of the CDU. He announced his resignation after being elected to the Bundestag in the 2021 German federal election. Laschet was the CDU/CSU's Chancellor candidate in the election, and stated he would take up his seat in the Bundestag even if he did not become Chancellor. Since the constitution of North Rhine-Westphalia prohibits members of the Bundestag from serving concurrently in the state government, he was obliged to resign as Minister-President.

On 5 October, Laschet proposed transport minister Hendrik Wüst his successor. He was subsequently elected uncontested as chairman of the North Rhine-Westphalia CDU on 23 October, receiving 98% approval. Laschet resigned on 25 October 2021, a day before the constituent session of the Bundestag.

Wüst was elected as Minister-President by the Landtag on 27 October, winning 103 votes out of 197 cast.

== Composition ==
| Portfolio | Minister | Party | Took office | Left office | State secretaries |
|---|---|---|---|---|---|
| Minister-President; State Chancellery | Hendrik Wüst born 19 June 1975 | CDU | 27 October 2021 | 28 June 2022 | Nathanael Liminski (Media, Head of the State Chancellery); Andrea Milz (Sport and Volunteering) |
| Deputy Minister-President Minister for Children, Family, Refugees and Integration | Joachim Stamp born 21 June 1970 | FDP | 28 October 2021 | 28 June 2022 | Andreas Bothe; Gonca Türkeli-Dehnert (Integration) |
| Minister for Finance | Lutz Lienenkämper born 24 May 1969 | CDU | 28 October 2021 | 28 June 2022 | Patrick Opdenhövel |
| Minister for Interior | Herbert Reul born 31 August 1952 | CDU | 28 October 2021 | 28 June 2022 | Jürgen Mathies |
| Minister for Economics, Innovation, Digitalisation and Energy | Andreas Pinkwart born 18 August 1960 | FDP | 28 October 2021 | 28 June 2022 | Christoph Dammermann |
| Minister for Labour, Health and Social Affairs | Karl-Josef Laumann born 11 July 1957 | CDU | 28 October 2021 | 28 June 2022 | Edmund Heller |
| Minister for School and Education | Yvonne Gebauer born 2 August 1966 | FDP | 28 October 2021 | 28 June 2022 | Mathias Richter |
| Minister for Homeland, Communities, Construction and Equality | Ina Scharrenbach born 30 September 1976 | CDU | 28 October 2021 | 28 June 2022 | Jan Heinisch |
| Minister for Justice | Peter Biesenbach born 10 February 1948 | CDU | 28 October 2021 | 28 June 2022 | Dirk Wedel |
| Minister for Transport | Ina Brandes born 1977 | CDU | 28 October 2021 | 28 June 2022 | Hendrik Schulte |
| Minister for Environment, Agriculture, and Nature and Consumer Protection | Ursula Heinen-Esser born 7 October 1965 | CDU | 28 October 2021 | 7 April 2022 | Heinrich Bottermann |
| Minister for Environment, Agriculture, and Nature and Consumer Protection | Lutz Lienenkämper(acting) born 24 May 1969 | CDU | 8 April 2022 | 28 June 2022 | Heinrich Bottermann |
| Minister for Culture and Science | Isabel Pfeiffer-Poensgen born 25 April 1954 | Ind. | 28 October 2021 | 28 June 2022 | Klaus Kaiser; Dirk Günnewig |
| Minister for Federal, European and International Affairs | Stephan Holthoff-Pförtner born 5 October 1948 | CDU | 28 October 2021 | 28 June 2022 | Mark Speich |
