= Yvonne Gebauer =

German politician (born 1966)

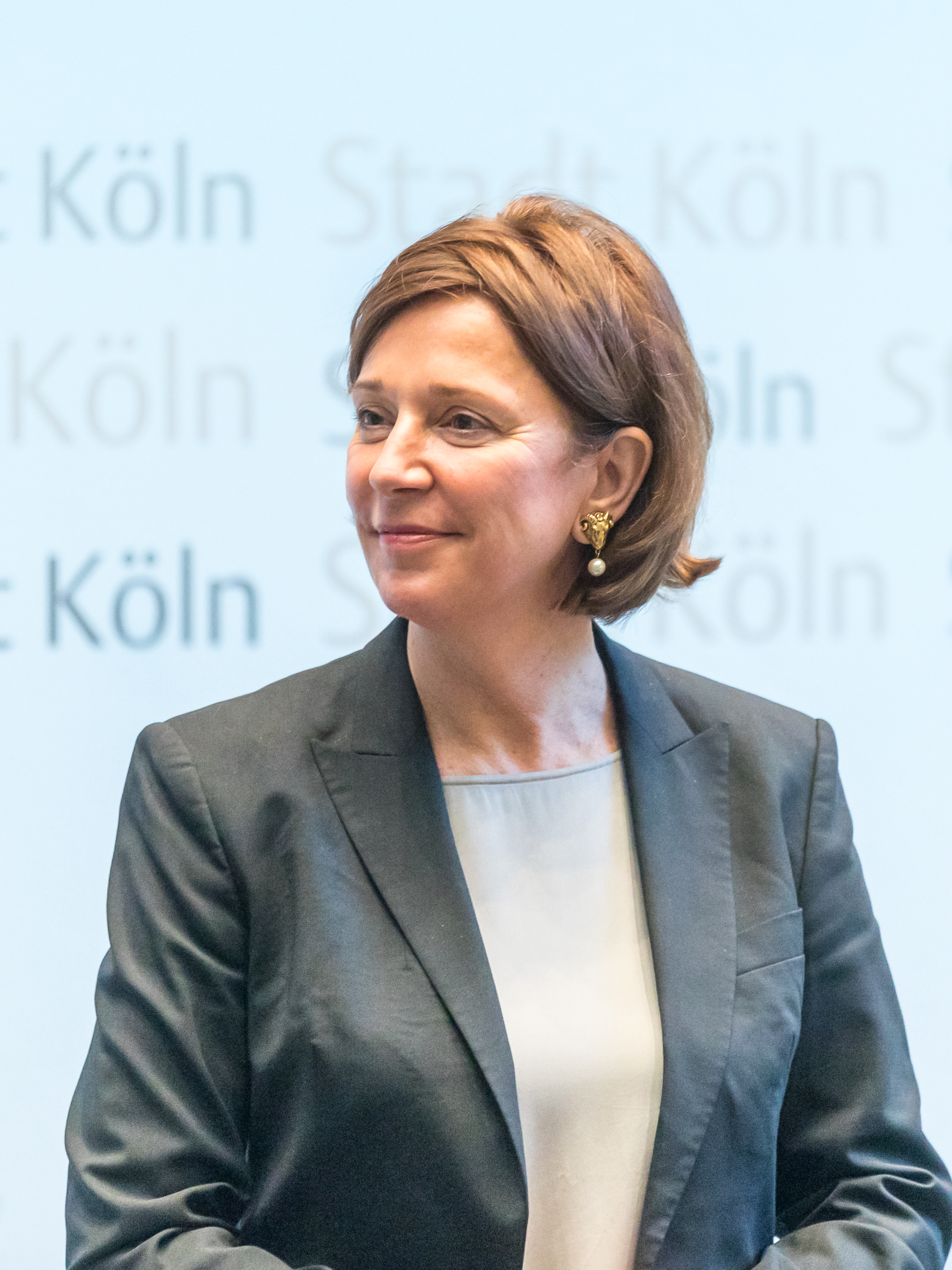
- Gebauer in 2020

Minister for School and Education of North Rhine-Westphalia
- In office 30 June 2017 – 29 June 2022
- Minister-President: Armin Laschet; Hendrik Wüst
- Preceded by: Sylvia Löhrmann
- Succeeded by: Dorothee Feller

Personal details
- Born: 2 August 1966 (age 59) Cologne, North Rhine-Westphalia, West Germany
- Party: Free Democratic Party (FDP)
- Children: 1
- Parent: Wolfgang Leirich (father)

Yvonne Gebauer (born 2 August 1966) is a German politician of the Free Democratic Party (FDP) who served as the State Minister for School and Education of North Rhine-Westphalia from 2017 to 2022. She was active in the local politics of her home city Cologne before being elected to the State Parliament of North Rhine-Westphalia in 2012. She has served on her party's state board since 2016.

== Early life ==
Gebauer was born on 2 August 1966 in Cologne. Her father was Wolfgang Leirich, a one-time leader of the Free Democratic Party (FDP) in her hometown. Having obtained her Abitur in 1985, she studied to become a clerk at a law firm and worked in this job until 1989. From 1989 until 1992, she worked on the staff of a Member of the German Bundestag. She managed a city-run accommodation facility.

== Political career ==
Having joined the FDP in 1982, Gebauer was elected to Cologne's city council in 2004, a position she held until 2012. In the 2012 North Rhine-Westphalia state election, she won a seat in the Landtag of North Rhine-Westphalia via her party's list and specialised in the politics of education. From 2015 to 2017, while serving as member of parliament, she served as the chairwoman of the FDP in Cologne.

Gebauer has been part of her party's leadership in North Rhine-Westphalia since 2016, under successive chairs Christian Lindner (2016–2017) and Joachim Stamp (2017–2023).

On 30 June 2017, Gebauer was appointed State Minister for School and Education in the governments of minister-presidents Armin Laschet and Hendrik Wüst. In the negotiations to form a so-called traffic light coalition of the Social Democratic Party (SPD), the Green Party and the FDP following the 2021 German elections, she was part of her party's delegation in the working group on education policy, co-chaired by Andreas Stoch, Felix Banaszak and Jens Brandenburg.

Gebauer was replaced by Dorothee Feller after the 2022 North Rhine-Westphalia state election.

== Personal life ==
Gebauer has one son.

== Bibliography ==
- Voogt, Gerhard (25 October 2017). "Yvonne Gebauer im Porträt NRW-Schulministerin hatte in Mathe auch mal eine Fünf". Kölner Stadt-Anzeiger (in German).
- Burger, Reiner (11 November 2022). "Problemfall Ruhrgebiet". Frankfurter Allgemeine Zeitung (in German).
