= Laschet cabinet =

State government of North Rhine-Westphalia

Cabinet of Armin Laschet Cabinet Laschet
- 24th Cabinet of North Rhine-Westphalia
- 30 June 2017 – 27 October 2021
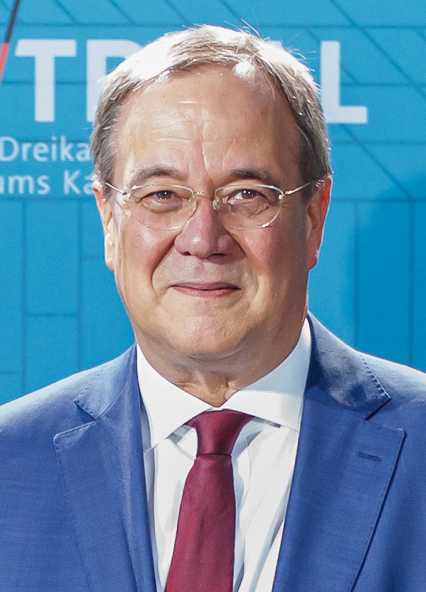
- Armin Laschet in 2021
- Date formed: 30 June 2017
- Date dissolved: 27 October 2021

People and organisations
- Minister-President: Armin Laschet
- Deputy Minister-President: Joachim Stamp
- No. of ministers: 12
- Member parties: Christian Democratic Union; Free Democratic Party
- Status in legislature: Coalition government (Majority)
- Opposition parties: Social Democratic Party; Alliance 90/The Greens; Alternative for Germany

History
- Election: 2017 North Rhine-Westphalia state election
- Legislature term: 17th Landtag of North Rhine-Westphalia
- Predecessor: Second Kraft Cabinet
- Successor: Wüst cabinet

The Laschet cabinet was the state government of North Rhine-Westphalia between 2017 and 2021, sworn in on 30 June 2017 after Armin Laschet was elected as Minister-President of North Rhine-Westphalia by the members of the Landtag of North Rhine-Westphalia. It was the 24th Cabinet of North Rhine-Westphalia.

It was formed after the 2017 North Rhine-Westphalia state election by the Christian Democratic Union (CDU) and Free Democratic Party (FDP). Excluding the Minister-President, the cabinet comprised twelve ministers. Eight were members of the CDU, three were members of the FDP, and one was an independent politician.

After Laschet's resignation as Minister-President, the Laschet cabinet was succeeded by the Wüst cabinet on 28 October 2021.

== Formation ==
The previous cabinet was a coalition government of the Social Democratic Party (SPD) and The Greens led by Minister-President Hannelore Kraft.

The election took place on 14 May 2017, and resulted in substantial losses for both governing parties. The opposition CDU and FDP both recorded gains, with the former becoming the largest party. The AfD debuted at 7%.

Overall, the incumbent coalition lost its majority. The opposition coalition of the CDU and FDP won a slim majority of one seat. Also considered was a grand coalition of the CDU and SPD, but the SPD rejected this the day after the election. CDU leader Armin Laschet initially announced plans to held exploratory talks with the SPD, FDP, and Greens, but only the FDP accepted the offer.

On 22 May, the CDU and FDP boards unanimously voted to begin negotiations for a coalition. Meetings began the following day. They presented their coalition agreement in mid-June. The FDP held an online membership ballot to review the pact, with 97% voting in favour on about 50% turnout. The CDU congress unanimously approved the contract the next day, and it was formally signed on 26 June.

Laschet was elected as Minister-President by the Landtag on 27 June, winning 100 votes out of 196 cast. His cabinet was sworn in on 30 June.

== Composition ==
Portfolio	Minister	Party	Took office	Left office	State secretaries
Minister-President; State Chancellery	Armin Laschet born 18 February 1961	CDU	27 June 2017	26 October 2021	Nathanael Liminski (Media, Head of the State Chancellery); Andrea Milz (Sport and Volunteering)
Acting Minister-President	Joachim Stamp born 21 June 1970	FDP	26 October 2021	27 October 2021	
Deputy Minister-President Minister for Children, Family, Refugees and Integration	Joachim Stamp born 21 June 1970	FDP	30 June 2017	27 October 2021	Andreas Bothe; Serap Güler (Integration)
Minister for Finance	Lutz Lienenkämper born 24 May 1969	CDU	30 June 2017	27 October 2021	Patrick Opdenhövel
Minister for Interior	Herbert Reul born 31 August 1952	CDU	30 June 2017	27 October 2021	Jürgen Mathies
Minister for Economics, Innovation, Digitalisation and Energy	Andreas Pinkwart born 18 August 1960	FDP	30 June 2017	27 October 2021	Christoph Dammermann
Minister for Labour, Health and Social Affairs	Karl-Josef Laumann born 11 July 1957	CDU	30 June 2017	27 October 2021	Edmund Heller
Minister for School and Education	Yvonne Gebauer born 2 August 1966	FDP	30 June 2017	27 October 2021	Mathias Richter
Minister for Homeland, Communities, Construction and Equality	Ina Scharrenbach born 30 September 1976	CDU	30 June 2017	27 October 2021	Jan Heinisch
Minister for Justice	Peter Biesenbach born 10 February 1948	CDU	30 June 2017	27 October 2021	Dirk Wedel
Minister for Transport	Hendrik Wüst born 19 July 1975	CDU	30 June 2017	27 October 2021	Hendrik Schulte
Minister for Environment, Agriculture, and Nature and Consumer Protection	Christina Schulze Föcking born 19 November 1976	CDU	30 June 2017	15 May 2018	Heinrich Bottermann
Minister for Environment, Agriculture, and Nature and Consumer Protection	Ursula Heinen-Esser born 7 October 1965	CDU	24 May 2018	27 October 2021	Heinrich Bottermann
Minister for Culture and Science	Isabel Pfeiffer-Poensgen born 25 April 1954	Ind.	30 June 2017	27 October 2021	Klaus Kaiser; Annette Storsberg
Minister for Federal, European and International Affairs	Stephan Holthoff-Pförtner born 5 October 1948	CDU	30 June 2017	27 October 2021	Mark Speich
