= Laschet (surname) =

Laschet is a surname. Notable people with the surname include:

- Armin Laschet (born 1961), German politician
- Susanne Laschet (born 1962), German philanthropist, wife of Armin

== See also ==
- Laschet cabinet, the state government of North Rhine-Westphalia
