= Marcus Optendrenk =

German politician (born 1969)

Marcus Optendrenk MdL
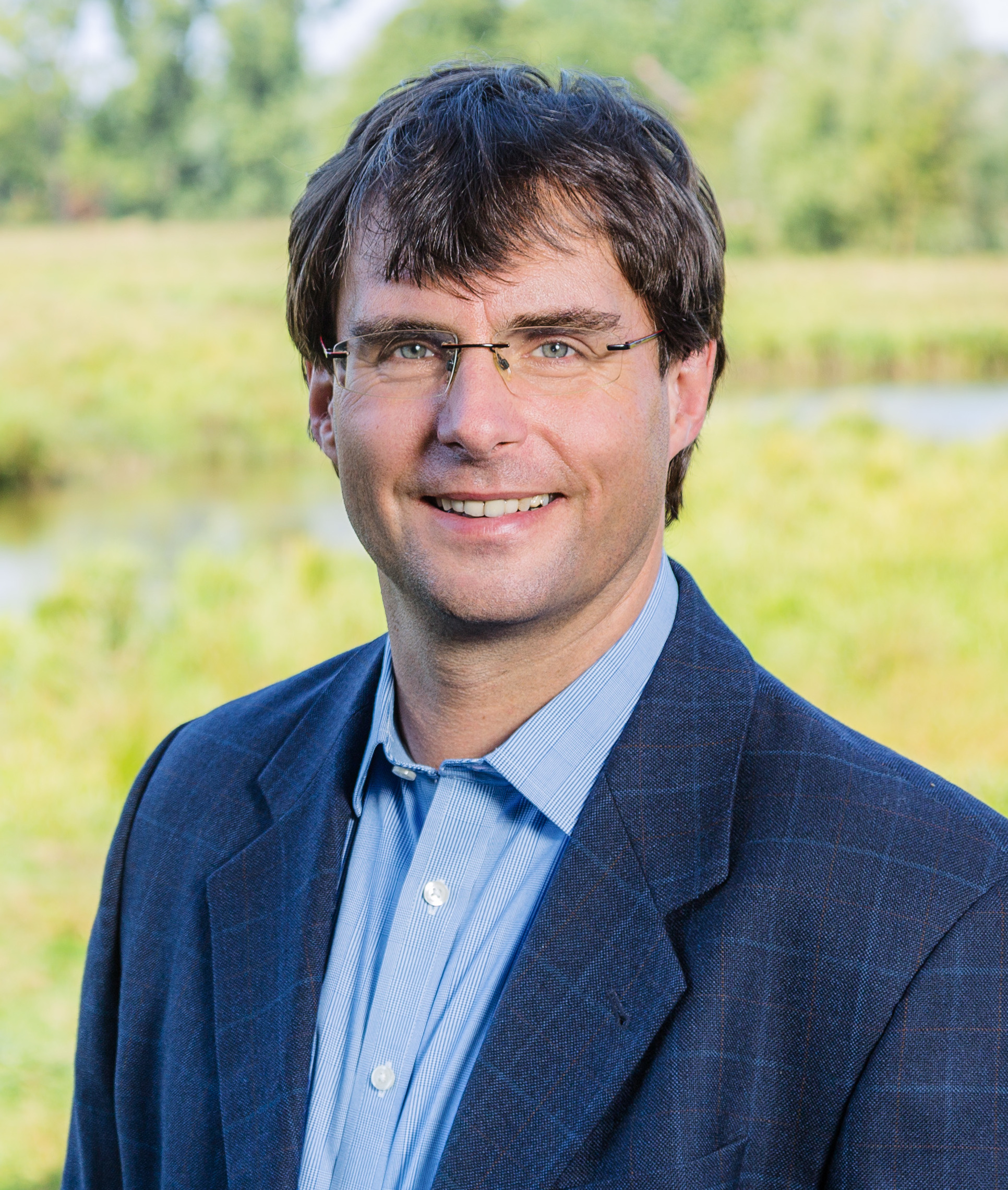
- Optendrenk in 2017

Finance Minister of North Rhine-Westphalia
- Incumbent
- Assumed office 26 June 2022
- Preceded by: Lutz Lienenkämper
- Minister-President: Hendrik Wüst

Personal details
- Born: 1969 (age 56–57) Lobberich, North Rhine-Westphalia, West Germany (now Germany)
- Party: Christian Democratic Union
- Children: 1
- Education: University of Trier; Maastricht University

Marcus Optendrenk (born 1969) is a German politician of the Christian Democratic Union (CDU) who has been serving as Minister of Finance of North Rhine-Westphalia since 29 June 2022. He was first elected to the Landtag of North Rhine-Westphalia in 2012.

== Early life and education ==
Optendrenk was born in 1969 in Lobberich, North Rhine-Westphalia. From 1988 until 1995 he studied law, history, and English at the universities of Trier and Maastricht. He obtained a doctorate in history.

== Early career ==
From 1999 until 2005, Optendrenk worked as a policy researcher for his party's group in the Landtag of North Rhine-Westphalia, working first on infrastructure and, from 2001, on fiscal matters. From 2005 to 2010, he served as the chief of staff to Helmut Linssen, who was then State Minister of Finance of North Rhine-Westphalia. After holding a posting at the state's ministry of finance for two years,

== Political career ==
A member of the Christian Democratic Union of Germany (CDU), Optendrenk held several leadership positions in the local party association and its youth wing, Young Union, in the late 1990s and early 2000s. He was elected a member of the Landtag of North Rhine-Westphalia in the 2012 North Rhine-Westphalia state election.

In the negotiations to form a coalition government of the CDU and Green Party under Armin Laschet following the 2017 state elections, Optendrenk was part of his party's delegation in the working group on economic affairs, infrastructure und financial policy. According to Kölner Stadt-Anzeiger, he was considered for a positions in Laschet's cabinet but became deputy chairman of the CDU's parliamentary group instead.

=== State Minister of Finance, 2022–present ===
On 29 June 2022, Optendrenk was appointed State Minister of Finance in the second government of Hendrik Wüst. In late 2022, Optendrenk's budget was found to be unconstitutional by the state's auditing authority for reappropriating more than four billion Euro of debt taken on for the purpose of COVID-19 relief.

In the negotiations to form a Grand Coalition under the leadership of Friedrich Merz's Christian Democrats (CDU together with the Bavarian CSU) and the SPD following the 2025 German elections, Optendrenk was part of the CDU/CSU delegation in the working group on public finances, led by Mathias Middelberg, Florian Oßner and Dennis Rohde.

== Other activities ==
=== Corporate boards ===
- KfW, Member of the Board of Supervisory Directors (since 2025)
- NRW.BANK, Ex-Officio member of the supervisory board (since 2022)

=== Non-profit organizations ===
- Aktion Deutschland Hilft (Germany's Relief Coalition), Member of the Board of Trustees (since 2022)
- Action Medeor, Member of the Advisory Board

== Personal life ==
Optendrenk is married and has one son.
