= Wüst cabinet =

Wüst cabinet may refer to:

- First Wüst cabinet, North Rhine-Westphalia state government 2021-2022
- Second Wüst cabinet, North Rhine-Westphalia state government since 2022
