= Bodo Löttgen =

German politician

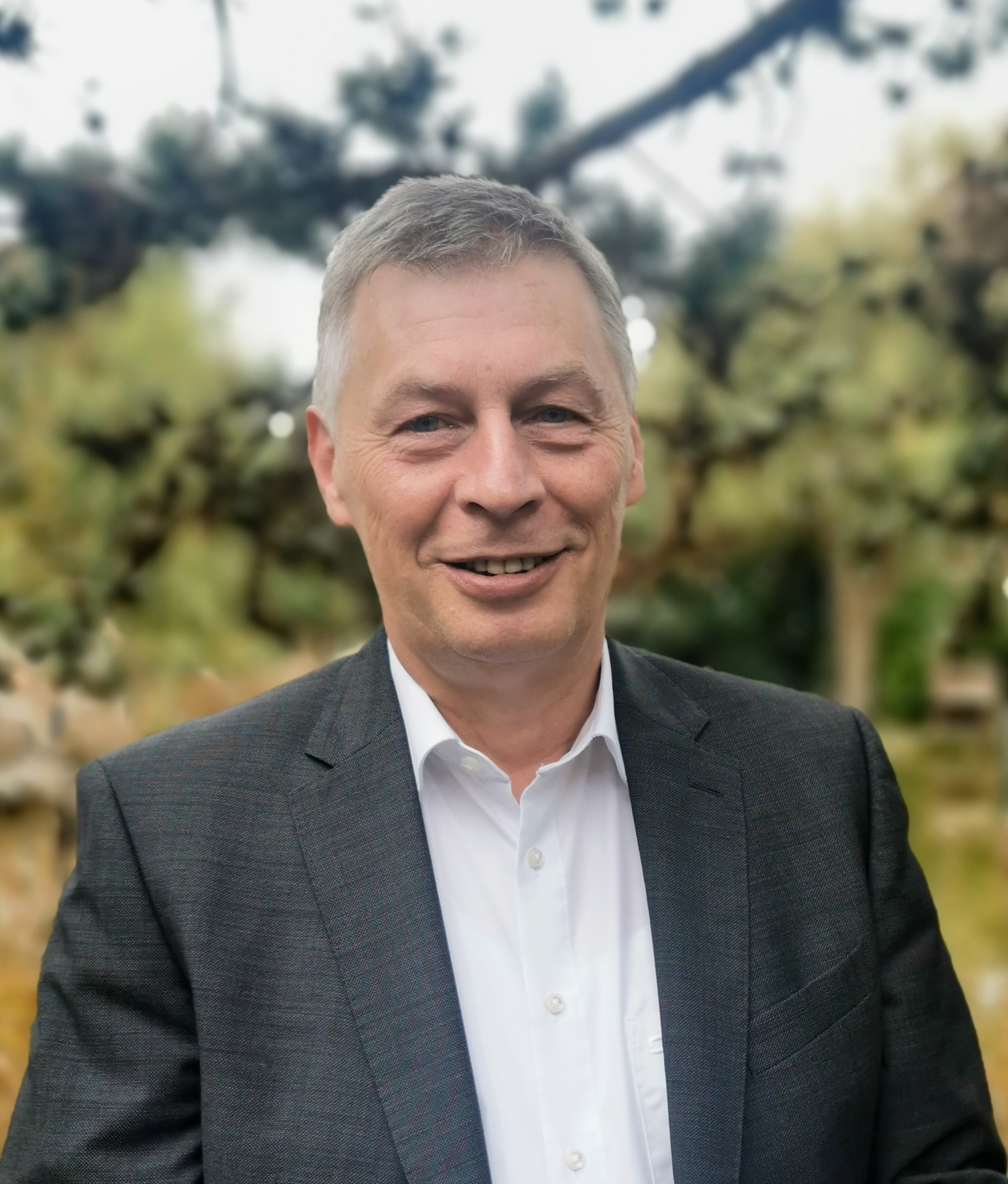
Bodo Löttgen (2021)

Bodo Löttgen (born 5 May 1959 in Elsenroth) is a German police officer and politician of the Christian Democratic Union (CDU) who has served as a member of the State Parliament of North Rhine-Westphalia from 2005 to 2012 and again since 2017. He has been chairing his party's parliamentary group since 2017.

== Early life and career ==
Löttgen was born 1959 in the West German village of Elsenroth and studied applied administrative science and became a high-ranking police officer.

== Political career ==
Löttgen was first elected directly to the State Parliament of North Rhine-Westphalia in the 2005 elections.

In the negotiations to form a coalition government under the leadership of Minister-President of North Rhine-Westphalia Hendrik Wüst following the 2022 state elections, Löttgen was part of his party's delegation.

== Other activities ==
- Borussia Dortmund, Member of the supervisory board (since 2019)
