= Dorothee Feller =

German politician (born 1966)

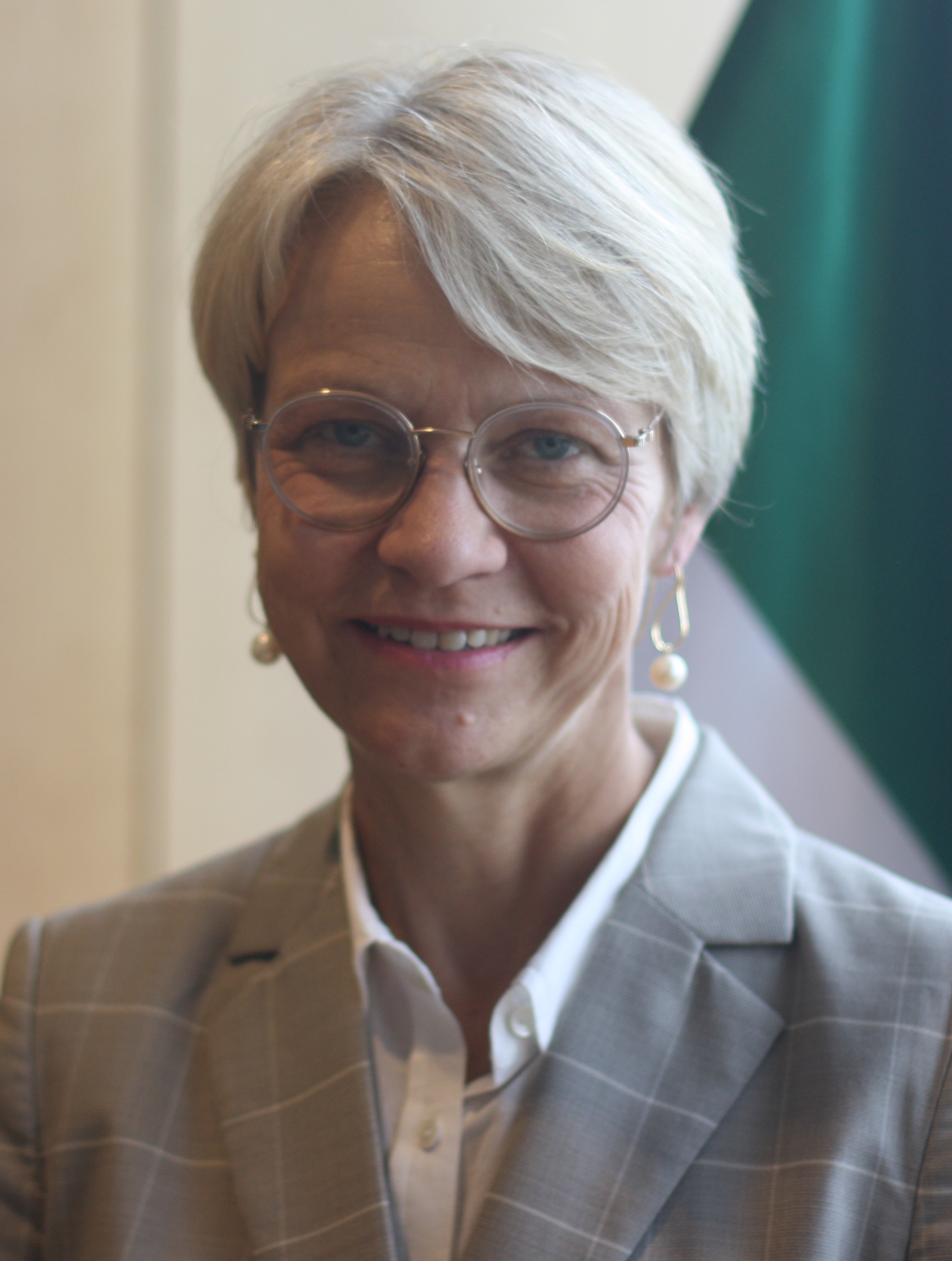
- Feller in 2024

Minister of Schools and Education of North Rhine-Westphalia
- Incumbent
- Assumed office 29 June 2022
- Minister-President: Hendrik Wüst
- Preceded by: Yvonne Gebauer

Personal details
- Born: 6 May 1966 (age 59) Dorsten
- Party: Christian Democratic Union

Dorothee Feller (born 6 May 1966 in Dorsten) is a German politician serving as minister of schools and education of North Rhine-Westphalia since 2022. From 2017 to 2022, she served as district president of Münster.
