= Isabel Pfeiffer-Poensgen =

German politician, lawyer and administrative officer

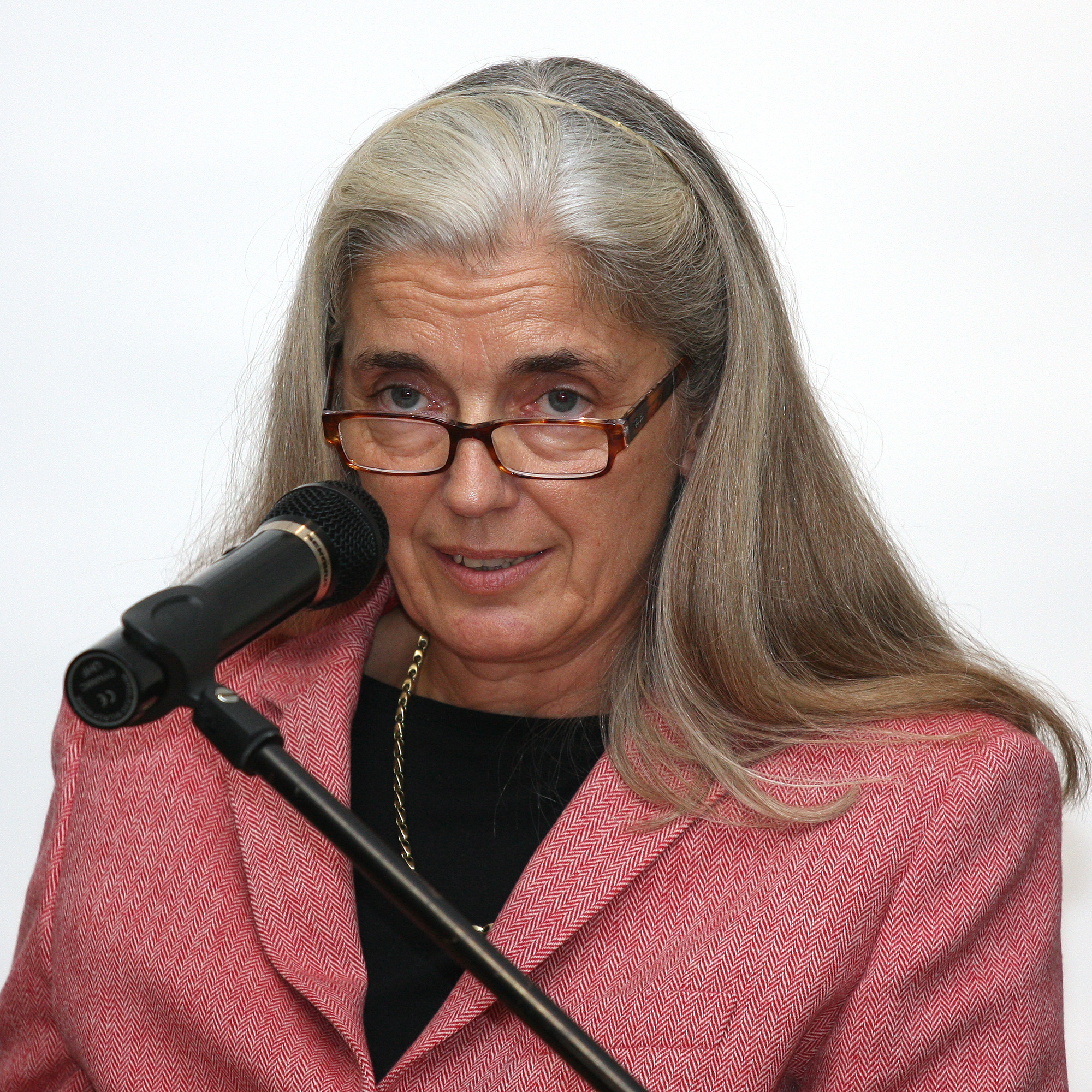
Isabel Pfeiffer-Poensgen, 2010

Isabel Pfeiffer-Poensgen (born 25 April 1954, in Aachen) is a German politician, lawyer and administrative officer. who served as State Minister of Culture and Science in the governments of Minister-Presidents Armin Laschet and Hendrik Wüst of North Rhine-Westphalia from 2017 to 2022. Since 2023 she is managing director of the Carl Friedrich von Siemens Foundation in Munich.

== Career ==
From 1989 until 1999, Pfeiffer-Poensgen was the chancellor of the Cologne College of Music.

From 2004 until 2017, Pfeiffer-Poensgen served as Secretary General of the Cultural Foundation of the German Federal States (KdL).

Following the 2017 state elections in North Rhine-Westphalia, Pfeiffer-Poensgen was appointed State Minister of Culture and Science in the government of Minister-President Armin Laschet. As one of the state's representatives at the Bundesrat, she served as a member of the Committee on Cultural Affairs from 2017 to 2022. In addition, she was also a member of the German-French Friendship Group set up by the German Bundesrat and the French Senate.

== Other activities (selection) ==
=== Corporate boards ===
- NRW.BANK, Member of the Supervisory Board (2017–2018)

=== Non-profit organizations ===
- LMU Munich, Member of the Board of Trustees (since 2026)
- Zollverein Coal Mine Industrial Complex, Member of the Board of Trustees (2018–2022)
- Deutschlandradio, Ex-Officio Member of the Supervisory Board (2017–2022)
- Josefine and Eduard von Portheim Foundation for Science and Art, Member of the Board of Trustees (since 2018)
- Düsseldorfer Schauspielhaus, Chairwoman of the Supervisory Board (since 2017)
- Heinrich Hertz Foundation, Member of the Board of Trustees (2017–2022)
- Helmholtz Association of German Research Centres, Ex-Officio Member of the Senate
- Kunststiftung NRW, Member of the Board of Trustees (2017–2022)
- Museum Insel Hombroich, Member of the Board of Trustees (2017–2022)
- North Rhine-Westphalian Academy of Sciences, Humanities and the Arts, Vice Chair of the Board of Trustees (2017–2022)
- Prussian Cultural Heritage Foundation (SPK), Deputy Chair of the Board
- Akademie Schloss Solitude, Member of the Board of Trustees
- Peter and Irene Ludwig Foundation, Chairwoman of the Board of Trustees
- German Lost Art Foundation, Chairwoman of the Board of Trustees (2015-2017)
- Franco-German Cultural Council (DFKR), Member of the Board of Trustees (2010-2017)
