= Ina Brandes =

German politician (born 1977)

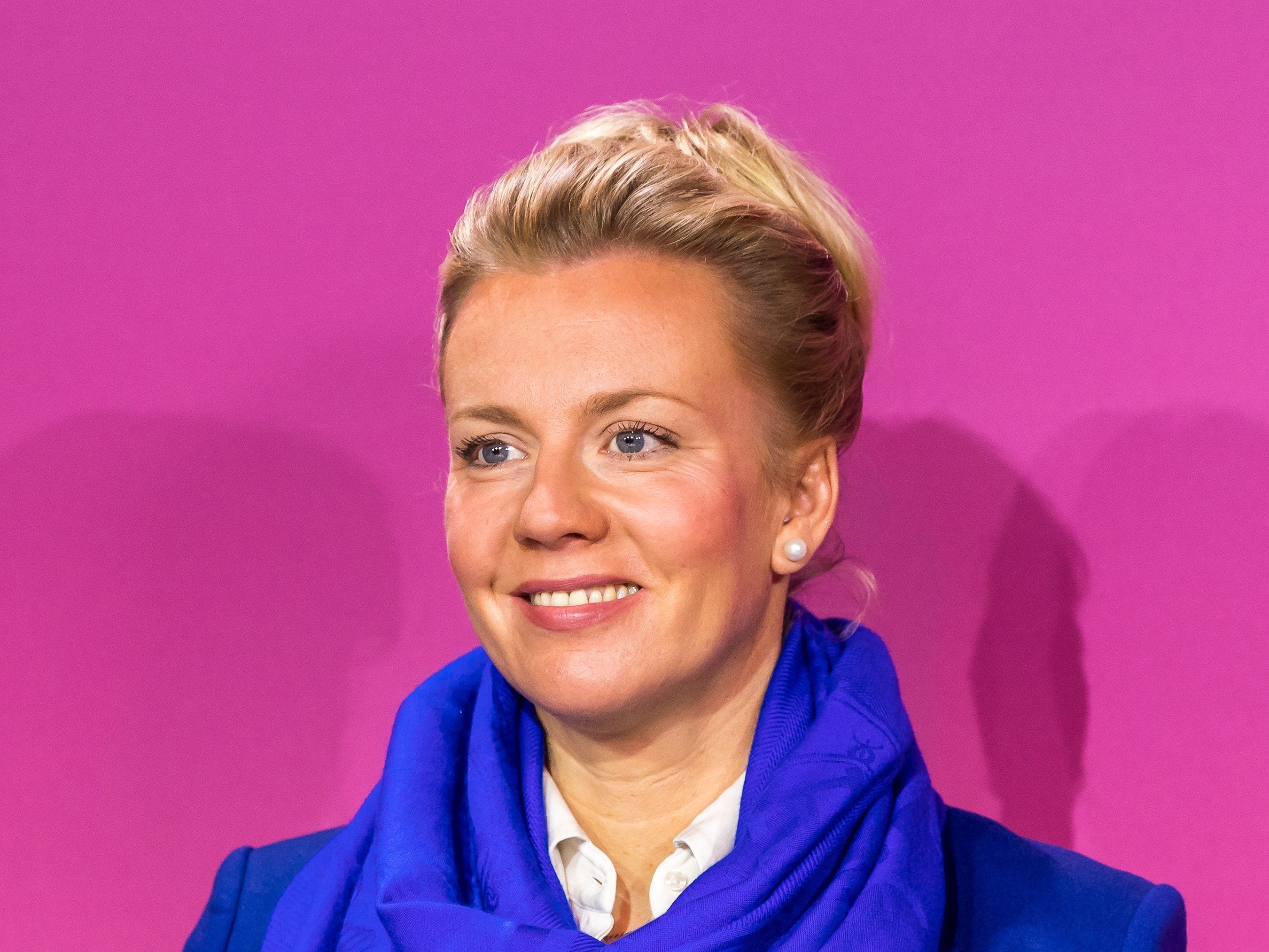
- Brandes in 2021

Minister of Culture and Science of North Rhine-Westphalia
- Incumbent
- Assumed office 29 June 2022
- Minister-President: Hendrik Wüst
- Preceded by: Isabel Pfeiffer-Poensgen

Personal details
- Born: 29 September 1977 (age 48)
- Party: Christian Democratic Union
- Relatives: Bruno Brandes (grandfather)

Ina Brandes (born 29 September 1977) is a German politician serving as minister of culture and science of North Rhine-Westphalia since 2022. From 2021 to 2022, she served as minister of transport. She has been a member of the Landtag of North Rhine-Westphalia since 2024.
