= Franziska Müller-Rech =

German politician (born 1985)

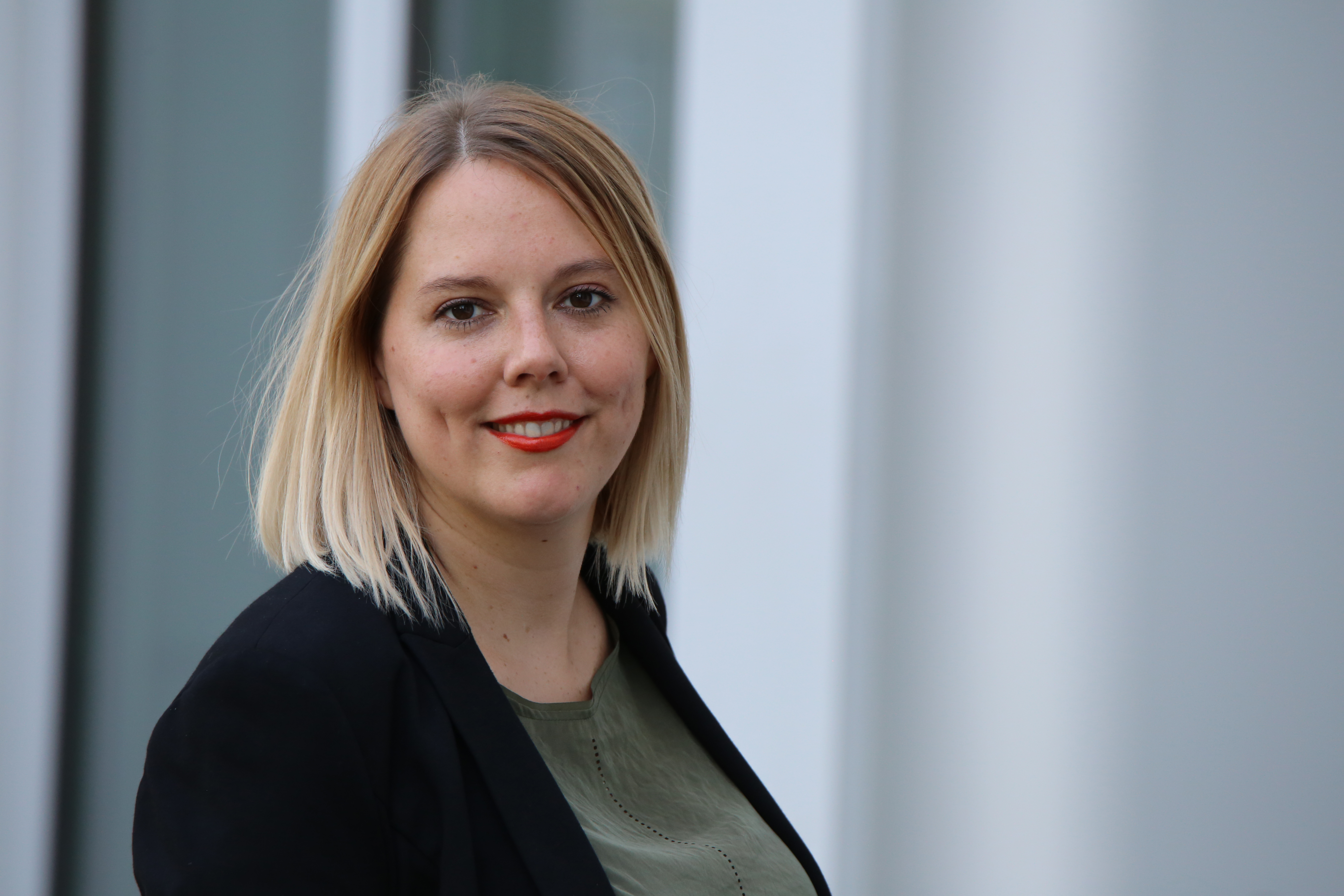
- Müller-Rech in 2020

Member of the Landtag of North Rhine-Westphalia
- Incumbent
- Assumed office 27 January 2023
- Preceded by: Joachim Stamp
- In office 1 June 2017 – 1 June 2022

Personal details
- Born: 16 July 1985 (age 41)
- Party: Free Democratic Party (since 2006)

Franziska Christiana Regina Müller-Rech (born 16 July 1985) is a German politician. She has been a member of the Landtag of North Rhine-Westphalia since 2023, having previously served from 2017 to 2022. From 2018 to 2023, she served as chairwoman of the Free Democratic Party in Bonn.
