= Christina Schulze Föcking =

German politician (born 1976)

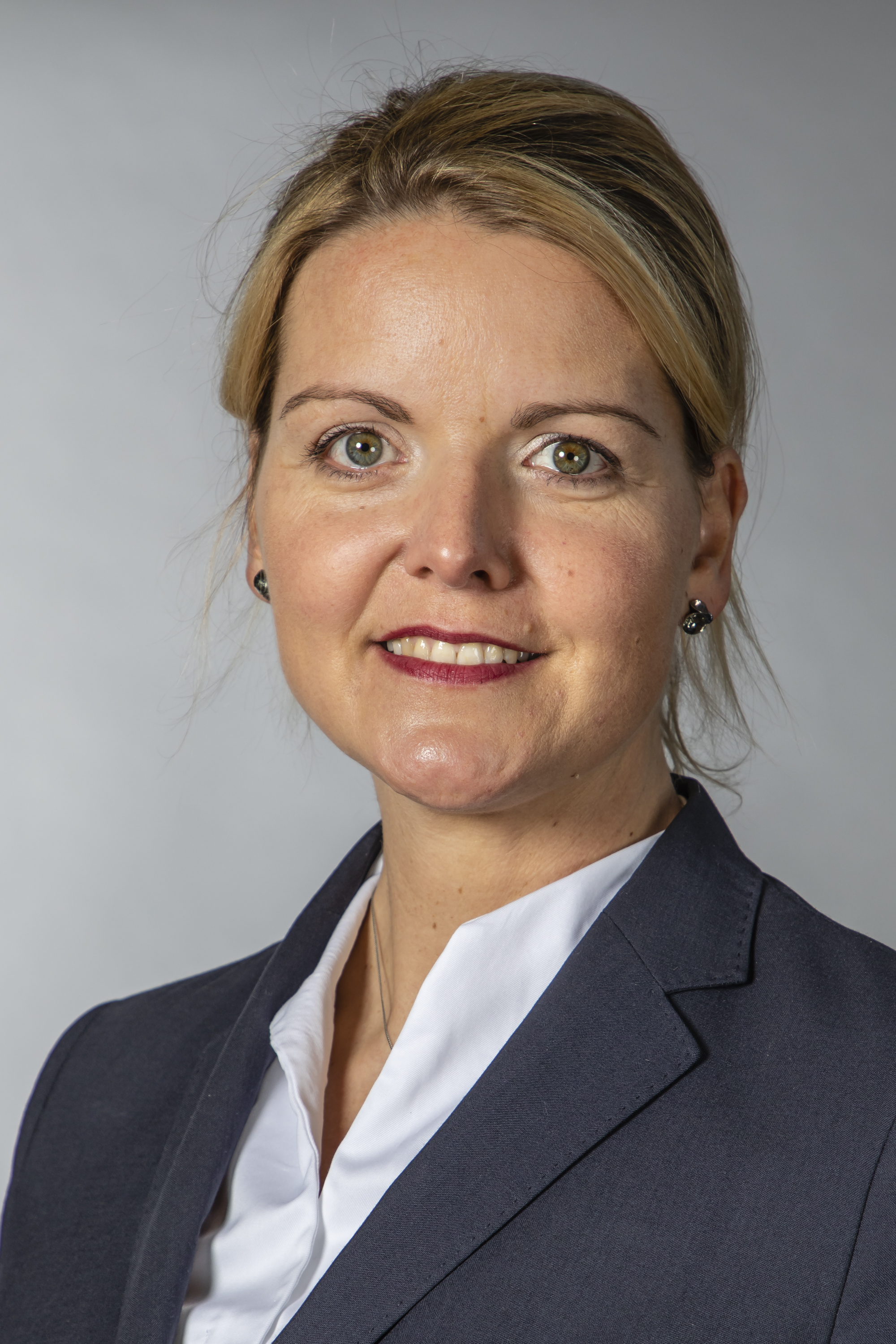
- Schulze Föcking in 2019

Minister of Environment, Agriculture, Nature Conservation and Consumer Protection of North Rhine-Westphalia
- In office 30 June 2017 – 15 May 2018
- Minister-President: Armin Laschet
- Preceded by: Johannes Remmel
- Succeeded by: Ursula Heinen-Esser

Personal details
- Born: 19 November 1976 (age 49) Emsdetten
- Party: Christian Democratic Union (since 2006)

Christina Schulze Föcking (born 19 November 1976 in Emsdetten) is a German politician serving as a member of the Landtag of North Rhine-Westphalia since 2010. From 2017 to 2018, she served as minister of environment, agriculture, nature conservation and consumer protection of North Rhine-Westphalia.
