= Andreas Pinkwart =

German politician and academic (born 1960)

Minister of Economics, Innovation, Digitization and Energy of North Rhine-Westphalia
- In office 30 June 2017 – 2022
- Minister-President: Armin Laschet
- Preceded by: Svenja Schulze (Innovation, Science and Research)
- Succeeded by: Mona Neubaur

Deputy Minister-President of North Rhine-Westphalia
- In office 24 June 2005 – 15 July 2010
- Minister-President: Jürgen Rüttgers
- Preceded by: Michael Vesper
- Succeeded by: Sylvia Löhrmann

Minister of Innovation, Science, Research and Technology of North Rhine-Westphalia
- In office 24 June 2005 – 15 July 2010
- Minister-President: Jürgen Rüttgers
- Preceded by: Hannelore Kraft (Science and Research)
- Succeeded by: Svenja Schulze (Innovation, Science and Research)

Member of the Landtag of North Rhine-Westphalia
- In office 9 June 2010 – 31 March 2011
- Succeeded by: Holger Ellerbrock
- Constituency: FDP List

Member of the Bundestag for North Rhine-Westphalia
- In office 17 October 2002 – 28 June 2005
- Succeeded by: Michael Terwiesche
- Constituency: FDP List

Personal details
- Born: 18 August 1960 (age 66) Neunkirchen-Seelscheid, West Germany
- Party: Free Democratic Party
- Education: University of Bonn
- Occupation: Professor

Andreas Pinkwart (born 1960) is a German politician and academic who served as State Minister for Economic Affairs, Digitization, Innovation and Energy in the governments of Ministers-President Armin Laschet and Hendrik Wüst of North Rhine-Westphalia from 2017 to 2022 and as Deputy Minister-President and State Minister for Innovation, Technology and Research from 2005 to 2010. He previously was the Dean of HHL Leipzig Graduate School of Management and holder of the Stiftungsfonds Deutsche Bank Chair of Innovation Management and Entrepreneurship.

== Education ==
Pinkwart was born in Neunkirchen-Seelscheid, North Rhine-Westphalia. After finishing his Abitur (A-levels) in 1979 Pinkwart took on an apprenticeship with Dresdner Bank in Cologne. He subsequently studied Economics and Management Science in Münster and Bonn, receiving his Diplom-Volkswirt in 1987. With his dissertation "Chaos und Unternehmenskrise" (chaos and a business crisis) he attained the title Dr. rer. from the Rheinische Friedrich-Wilhelms-University of Bonn. It was published as edition 116 of the series Beiträge zur betriebswirtschaftlichen Forschung.

== Career ==
=== Early beginnings ===
Pinkwart's political career is closely knit to the FDP (Free Democratic Party). He joined the party in 1980, at the age of 19. From 1988 to 1990 he was part of the FDP's scientific staff and from 1991 onwards he was first secretary to the chairman of the FDP's parliamentary group in the Bundestag, Hermann Otto Solms.

Pinkwart's career in Higher Education began 1994 at the College of Higher Education in Düsseldorf, where he was professor of Economics and Management Science. From 1998 onwards a professorship at the University of Siegen followed, where Pinkwart taught Business Administration with focus on SMEs.

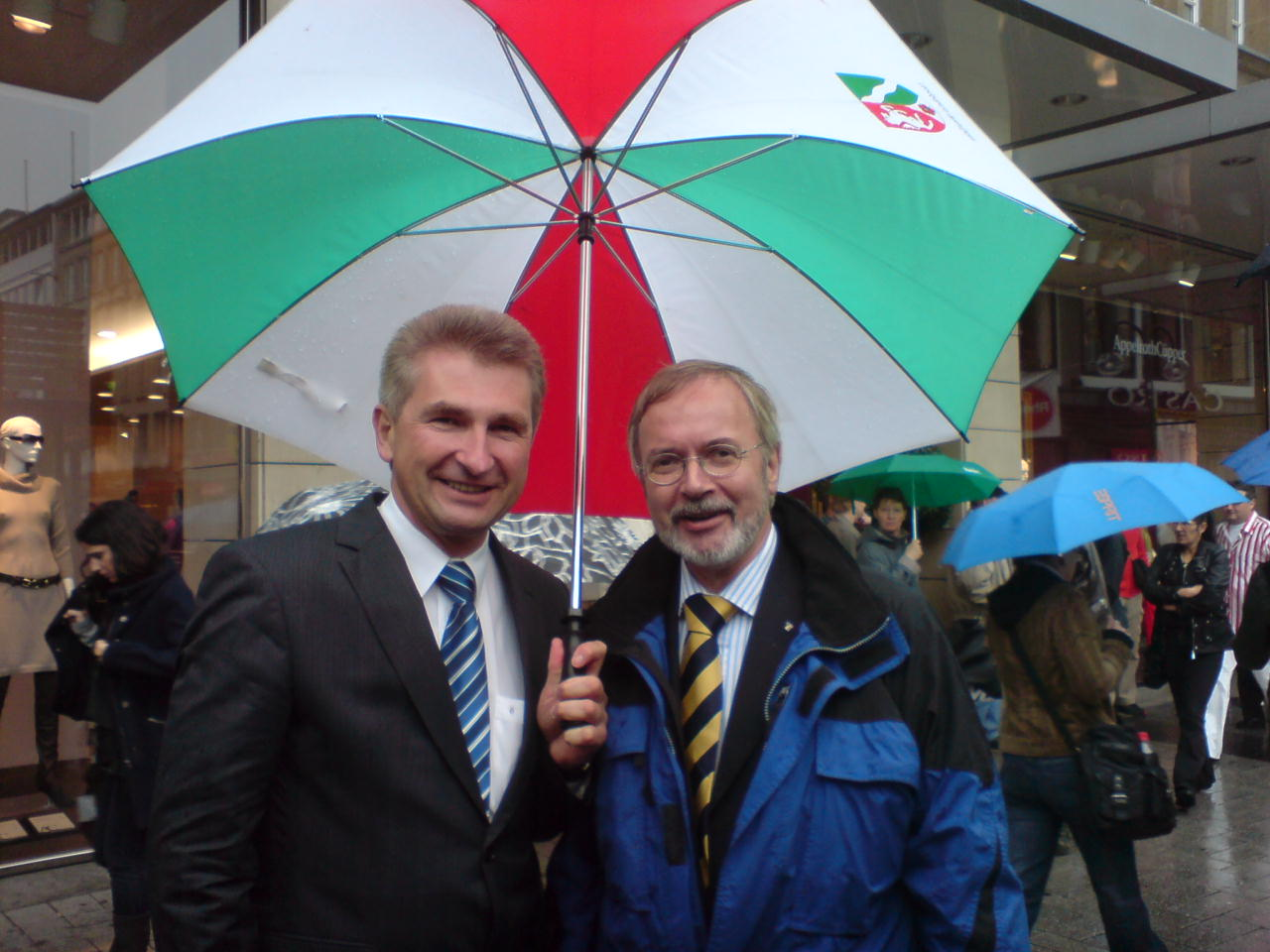
Pinkwart and Werner Hoyer at a campaign event in Cologne (2009)

In 2002, Pinkwart succeeded Jürgen Möllemann as chairman of the FDP in North Rhine-Westphalia, an office he held until 2010. From 2003, he also served as one of the national party's deputy chairmen under the leadership of Guido Westerwelle.

=== Member of the German Parliament, 2002–2005 ===
From 2002 to 2005 Pinkwart was a Member of Parliament (German Bundestag), where he was part of the FDP parliamentary group led by Wolfgang Gerhardt. He served as his parliamentary group's spokesperson on the Finance Committee between 2002 and 2004 and later as the group's spokesperson on the national budget. From 2004, he also led the Bundestag group of FDP parliamentarians from North Rhine-Westphalia, one of the largest delegations within the FDP parliamentary group.

=== Deputy Minister-President of North Rhine-Westphalia, 2005–2010 ===
From 2005 until 2010, Pinkwart served as State Minister for Innovation, Technology and Research and Deputy Minister-President of the state of North Rhine-Westphalia, under the leadership of Minister-President Jürgen Rüttgers. In this capacity, he was also a Member of the Federal Council (Bundesrat of Germany). During his time in office, the state government tried hard to win new research institutions to be set up in North Rhine-Westphalia; eventually, the Max Planck Society set up its Max Planck Institute for Biology of Ageing in Cologne, and the Helmholtz Association of German Research Centres based a new German Center for Neurodegenerative Diseases in Bonn.

Following the 2009 federal elections, Pinkwart was part of the FDP team in the negotiations with Chancellor Angela Merkel's CDU/CSU on a coalition agreement. He led his party's delegation in the working group on education and research policy; his co-chair of the CDU/CSU was Annette Schavan.

=== Return to academia ===
At the beginning of 2011 Pinkwart became a senior research fellow at the American Institute for Contemporary German Studies (AICGS) at the Johns Hopkins University, Washington D.C. His research project as fellow focused on the roles of universities as entrepreneurial hubs and engines of innovation in the U.S. and Germany. From 2011 he served as Dean of HHL Leipzig Graduate School of Management and the first holder of the Stiftungsfonds Deutsche Bank Chair of Innovation Management and Entrepreneurship.

=== State Minister for Economic Affairs, 2017–2022 ===
Following the 2017 state elections in North Rhine-Westphalia, Pinkwart was part of the FDP team in the negotiations with Armin Laschet's CDU on a coalition agreement. He led his party's delegation in the working group on economic affairs and energy policy; his co-chair of the CDU was Hendrik Wüst.

From 2017 to 2022, Pinkwart served as State Minister for Economic Affairs, Digitization, Innovation and Energy in the government of Minister-President Armin Laschet. In this capacity, he was also one of the state's representatives on the Bundesrat, where he served on the Committee on Foreign Affairs; the Committee on Economic Affairs; and the Committee on Urban Development, Housing and Regional Planning.

In the negotiations to form a so-called traffic light coalition of the Social Democrats (SPD), the Green Party and the FDP following the 2021 federal elections, Pinkwart led his party's delegation in the working group on digital policy; his co-chairs from the other parties were Jens Zimmermann and Malte Spitz.

Pinkwart was nominated by his party as delegate to the Federal Convention for the purpose of electing the President of Germany in 2022.

In November 2022, Pinkwart announced that he would resign his parliamentary seat and leave active politics.

== Political positions ==
Following the 2010 state elections, Pinkwart ruled out a center-left coalition between the SPD, the FDP and the Green Party even though the three parties would have been able to achieve a majority in the state parliament.

On energy policy, Pinkwart is widely regarded to be a critic of the country's energy transition as envisioned by former chancellors Gerhard Schröder and Angela Merkel. In 2017, he held that he wanted to preserve the use of fossil fuels and place greater restrictions on where wind turbines can be built. In 2018, he demanded at least 10 billion euros ($11.5 billion) in structural support if coal-fired power stations are phased out.

== Other activities ==
=== Corporate boards ===
- Deutsche Bank, member of the advisory board (2011-2017)
- Evotec AG, member of the supervisory board (2011-2014)
- NRW.BANK, Ex-Officio member of the supervisory board (1998-2011; 2017–2022)

=== Non-profits ===
- Bertelsmann Stiftung, Member of the Board of Trustees (since 2023)
- Fraunhofer Institute for Cell Therapy and Immunology (IZI), member of the board of trustees
- German Academic Exchange Service (DAAD), member of the board of trustees
- Jackstädt Center for Entrepreneurship and Innovation Research, University of Wuppertal, member of the advisory board
- Max Planck Institute for Mathematics in the Sciences (MPI MiS), Member of the Board of Trustees
- Rationalisierungs- und Innovationszentrum der Deutschen Wirtschaft, member of the board of trustees
- Dessau-Wörlitz Garden Realm, member of the board of trustees
- Vision: The Journal of Business Perspective, member of the editorial board
- German Association of University Professors and Lecturers (DHV), member
- German Academic Association for Business Research (VHB), member
- RAG-Stiftung, member of the board of trustees (2012-2014)

== Recognition ==
- Royal Norwegian Order of Merit (2007)
- Order of Merit of North Rhine-Westphalia (2012)
- University of Kent Innovation in Academia Award for Science and Business (2017)

== Personal life ==
Pinkwart is married and has two children. The family lives in Witterschlick.
