= Lutz Lienenkämper =

German politician (born 1969)

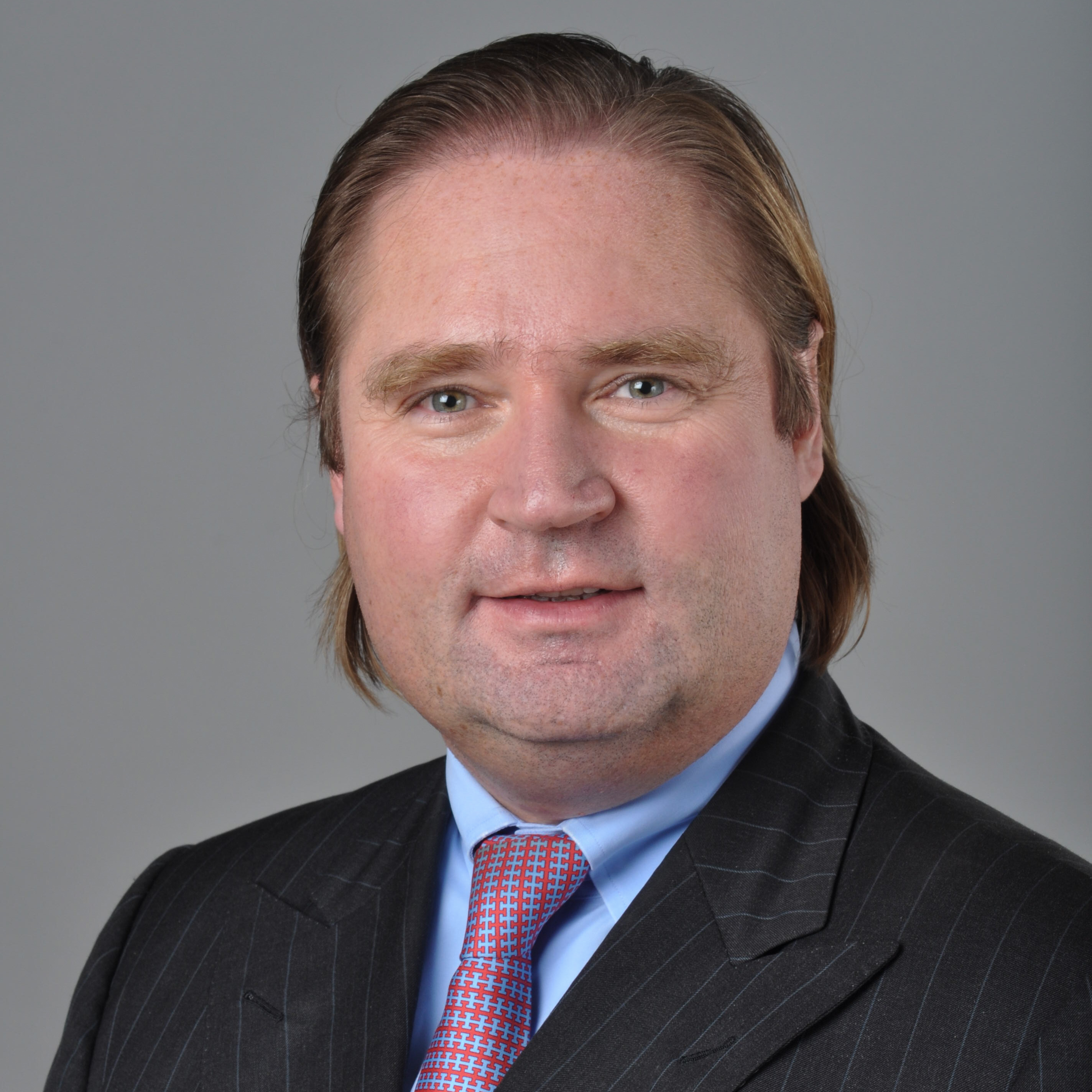
- Lienenkämper in 2013

Minister of Finance of North Rhine-Westphalia
- In office 30 June 2017 – 28 June 2022
- Minister-President: Armin Laschet; Hendrik Wüst
- Preceded by: Norbert Walter-Borjans
- Succeeded by: Marcus Optendrenk

Personal details
- Born: 24 May 1969 (age 56) Cologne
- Party: Christian Democratic Union (since 1988)

Lutz Lienenkämper (born 24 May 1969 in Cologne) is a German lawyer and politician of the Christian Democratic Union who has been serving as a member of the board of Bundesbank since 2024.

== Political career ==
From 2005 to 2024, Lienenkämper was a member of the State Parliament of North Rhine-Westphalia.

From 2009 to 2010, Lienenkämper served as State Minister of Construction and Transport in the government of Minister-President of North Rhine-Westphalia Jürgen Rüttgers. From 2017 to 2022, he served as State Minister of Finance in the governments of successive Ministers-President Armin Laschet and Hendrik Wüst. In 2022, he served as acting minister of environment and agriculture.

In the negotiations to form a coalition government of the CDU and Green Party under Wüst following the 2022 state elections, Lienenkämper and Günter Krings led their party’s delegation in the working group on finances; their counterparts from the Green Party were Felix Banaszak and Sven Giegold.
