= Daniel Sieveke =

German politician (born 1976)

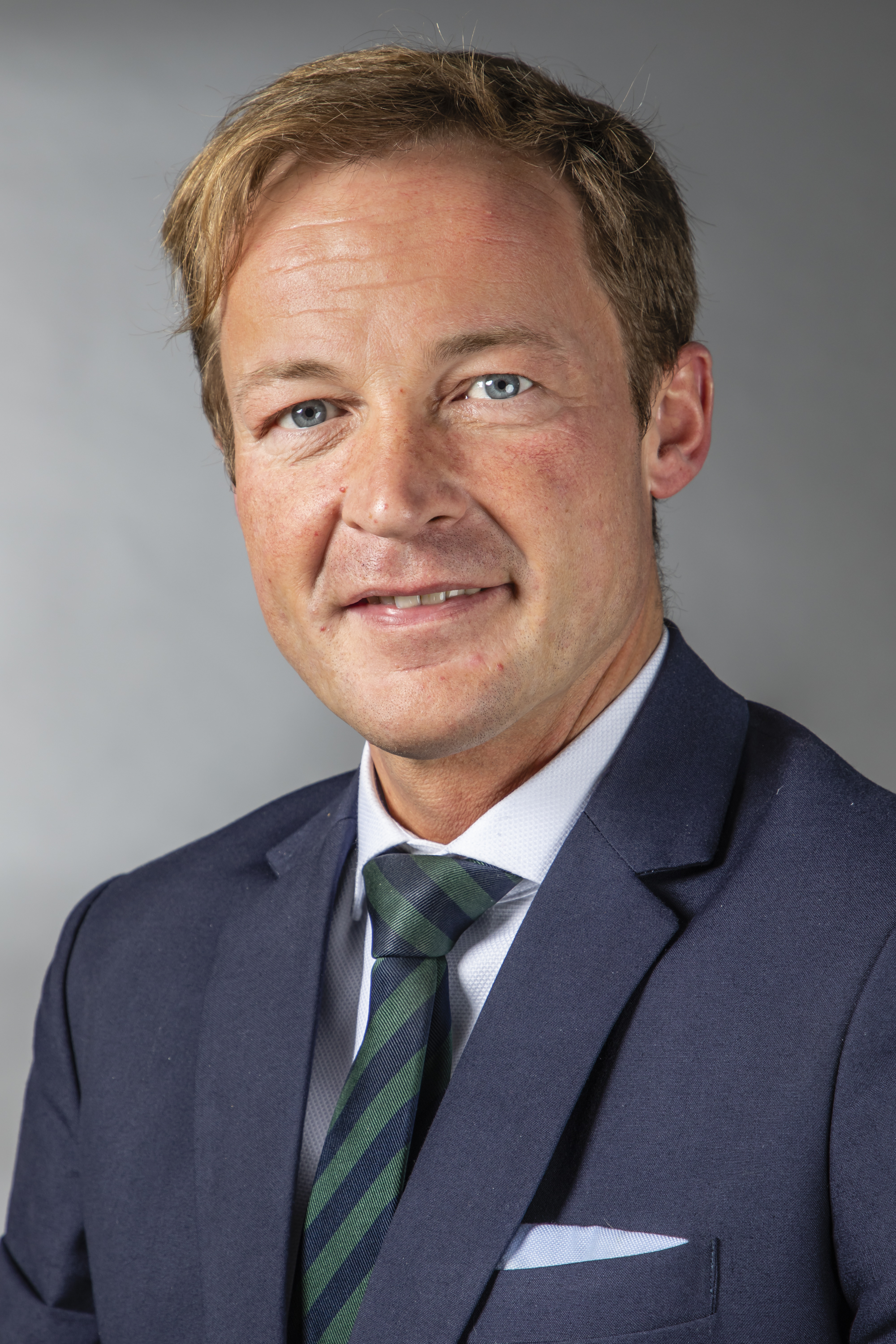
- Sieveke in 2019

Member of the Landtag of North Rhine-Westphalia
- In office 9 June 2010 – 29 June 2022
- Preceded by: Wolfgang Schmitz
- Succeeded by: Ina Scharrenbach
- Constituency: Paderborn II

Personal details
- Born: 30 November 1976 (age 49) Paderborn
- Party: Christian Democratic Union (since 1998)

Daniel Sieveke (born 30 November 1976 in Paderborn) is a German politician serving as state secretary of the Ministry of Regional Identity, Local Government, Building and Digitalization of North Rhine-Westphalia since 2022. From 2010 to 2022, he was a member of the Landtag of North Rhine-Westphalia.
