= Heinrich Malangré =

German manager and writer

Heinrich Malangré (25 July 1930 – 12 September 2017) was a German business executive, lawyer, publisher and philanthropist. An observant Catholic, he held many church offices and was a knight of the Order of the Holy Sepulchre.

== Background ==
He belonged to a prominent Aachen family and was the brother of the city's lord mayor Kurt Malangré. His family is of French-speaking Wallonian origin and moved from Haine-Saint-Pierre in Belgium to Stolberg (Aachen district) in the second half of the 19th century to establish a glass production business.

He married Thesi Wolf in 1955 and was the father of Susanne Laschet and the father-in-law of Armin Laschet.

== Career ==
He earned a law degree and a doctorate in law at the University of Bonn in 1956, and worked as a business executive in the glass industry from 1954. He was the director of economic policy at Saint-Gobain until 1984, when he became head of the Catholic publishing company Einhard Verlag. He was president of the Aachen Chamber of Industry and Commerce from 1981 to 1997 and then became its honorary president. He was also a board member of the Association of German Chambers of Industry and Commerce, President of the German–Belgian–Luxembourg Chamber of Commerce, President of the Association of the German Glass Industry and a board member of the Stadtsparkasse bank of Aachen. He also wrote several books on local history and co-founded the Ars Scribendi calligraphy association.

He was active in the Catholic Church and held numerous lay offices in the Roman Catholic Diocese of Aachen, including as chair of the Diocesan Council. He was involved in several social projects in the Holy Land, and became a knight of the Order of the Holy Sepulchre in 1974 and later became a knight commander.

== Honours ==
- 1974: Knight of the Order of the Holy Sepulchre
- 1988: Honorary citizen of RWTH Aachen University
- 1998: Great Cross of Merit of the Order of Merit of the Federal Republic of Germany

== Publications ==
- Vom Sinai zum Areopag – Impressionen einer Reise durch Israel u. Griechenland, Butzon und Bercker, Kevelaer, 1983, ISBN 3-7666-9287-9
- Von Rom nach Assisi: franziskanische Impressionen, Butzon und Bercker, Kevelaer, 1985, ISBN 3-7666-9379-4
- Auf Pilgerfahrt nach Santiago de Compostela, Einhard-Verlag Aachen, 1987, ISBN 3-920284-27-5
- Variationen über einen Bootssteg, Einhard-Verlag-Aachen, 1988, ISBN 3-920284-39-9* Gestalten um Karl den Grossen, Einhard-Verlag-Aachen, 1989, ISBN 3-920284-50-X
- David Hansemann – 1790–1864 – Beweger und Bewahrer – Lebensbild und Zeitbilder, Einhard-Verlag-Aachen, 1991, ISBN 3-920284-54-2
- Nikolaus Cusanus begegnet Menschen von heute – vom Sehen Gottes und vom belehrten Nichtwissen, Einhard-Verlag-Aachen, 1999, ISBN 3-930701-52-9
- Aachen–Reims – Notizen zur Partnerschaft – zwei Krönungsstädte im Beziehungsspiel von deutsch-französischer Geschichte und Lebensart. Einhard-Verlag-Aachen, 2004, ISBN 3-923773-21-8
- Aus Trümmern zur Europastadt – Aachen von 1945 bis 2005, Einhard-Verlag-Aachen, 2005, ISBN 3-928272-73-X
- Blicke auf Europa. Seine Wurzeln, sein Stamm, seine Krone, EFF ESS Verlagsanstalt, Augsburg, 2011, ISBN 978-3-98050-56-3-5
