= Joachim Stamp =

German politician (born 1970)

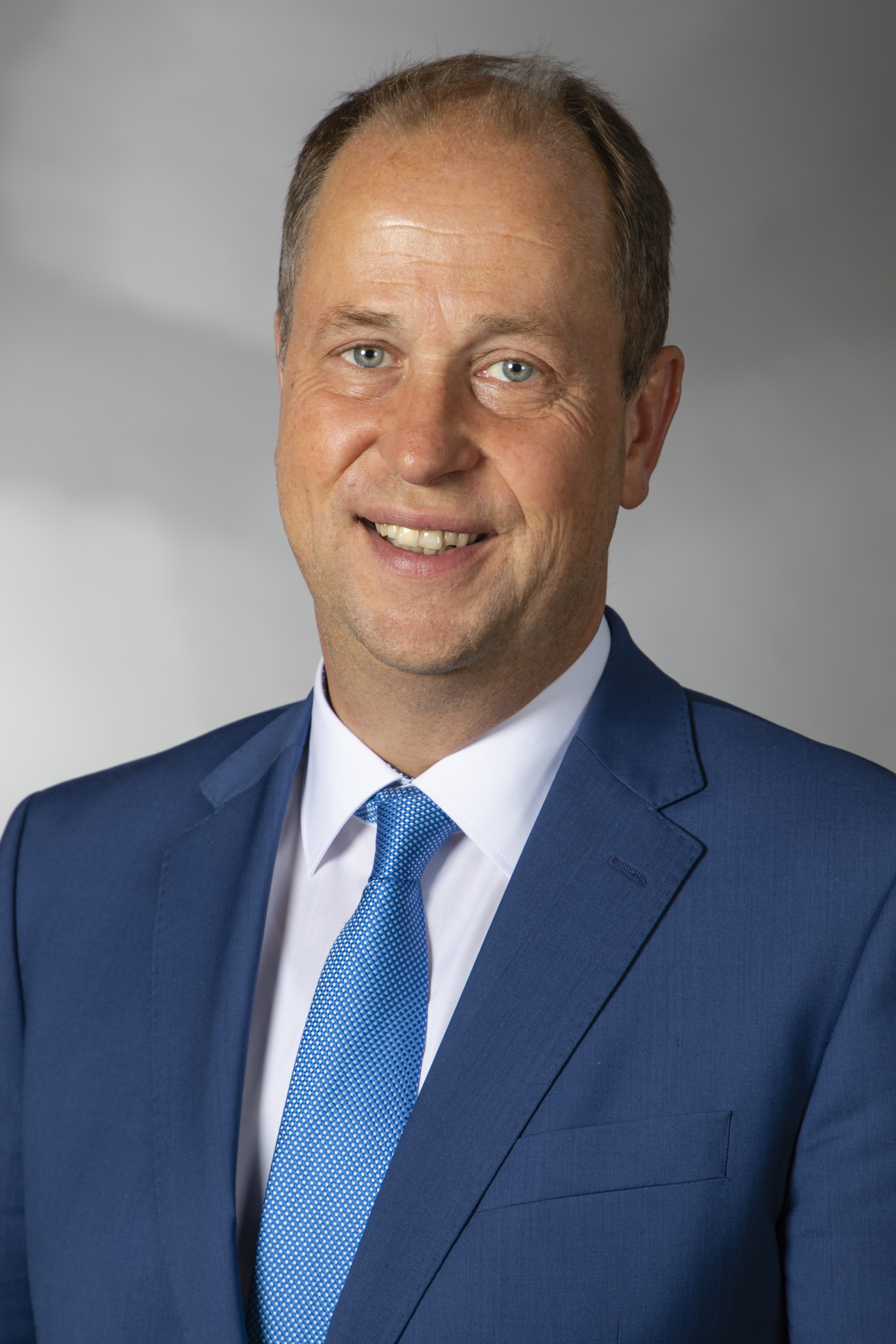

State Minister for Children, Family, Refugees and Integration of North Rhine-Westphalia
- In office 2017–2022
- Minister-President: Armin Laschet; Hendrik Wüst

Deputy Minister-President of North Rhine-Westphalia
- In office 2017–2022
- Minister-President: Armin Laschet; Hendrik Wüst
- Preceded by: Andreas Pinkwart
- Succeeded by: Mona Neubaur

Member of the Landtag of North Rhine-Westphalia
- In office 31 May 2012 – 26 January 2023
- Succeeded by: Franziska Müller-Rech
- Constituency: FDP List

Personal details
- Born: 21 June 1970 (age 56) Bad Ems, Rhineland-Palatinate, West Germany (now Germany)
- Party: Free Democratic Party
- Education: University of Bonn

Joachim Stamp (born 21 June 1970) is a German politician of the Free Democratic Party (FDP) who served as a member of the State Parliament of North Rhine-Westphalia from the 2012 elections to 2023. He served as Deputy Minister President of North Rhine-Westphalia from 2017 to 2022. From February 2023 to May 2025 he served as Special Representative of the Federal Government for Migration Agreements.

== Early life and education ==
Stamp was born as the son of a theology professor and a cantor. He studied political science at the University of Bonn.

== Political career ==
From 2010 to 2012, Stamp served as secretary general of the FDP in North Rhine-Westphalia, under the leadership of its chair Daniel Bahr. In 2017, he succeeded Christian Lindner as chair of the FDP in North Rhine-Westphalia.

In the negotiations to form a so-called traffic light coalition of the Social Democratic Party (SPD), the Green Party and the FDP following the 2021 German elections, Stamp led his party's delegation in the working group on migration and integration; The co-chairs from the other parties were Boris Pistorius and Luise Amtsberg.

Under Stamp's leadership, the FDP only managed to win 5.9 percent in the 2022 state elections and subsequently had to leave the ruling coalition government.

In December 2022, Stamp was appointed by Federal Minister of the Interior and Community Nancy Faeser as Special Commissioner for Migration. After this appointing, he resigned from his seat in the Landtag of North-Rhein Westphalia.

He was succeeded as Leader of the FDP of NRW by Henning Höne who was elected party leader in 2023

== Other activities ==
- Bonner Akademie für Forschung und Lehre praktischer Politik (BAPP), Member of the Board of Trustees

== Political positions ==
In the early months of the COVID-19 pandemic in Germany, Stamp criticised the perceived top-down approach of the federal government, saying the fact that the states had to constantly clear their policies with Chancellor Angela Merkel “creates the impression that we’re at court”. The states “need their freedom”, he added.

== Personal life ==
Stamp is married to economist Barbie Haller. The couple has two daughters and lives in Bonn’s Röttgen district.
