= Susanne Laschet =

First Lady of North Rhine-Westphalia

Personal details
- Born: Susanne Malangré; 18 May 1962 (age 63) Aachen, West Germany
- Spouse: Armin Laschet (m. 1985)

Susanne Laschet (née Malangré; born 18 May 1962) is a German bookseller, wife of former Minister-President of North Rhine-Westphalia and Chancellor of Germany candidate Armin Laschet.

== Background ==
Malangré was born to a prominent Aachen family and is the daughter of the prominent business executive Heinrich Malangré and the niece of the city's former lord mayor Kurt Malangré. Her family is of French-speaking Walloon origin and moved from Haine-Saint-Pierre in Belgium to Stolberg in the second half of the 19th century to establish a glass production business.

She trained as a bookseller and is a well-known bookseller in Aachen.

She met Armin Laschet as a child in a Catholic children's choir led by her father; they married in 1985 and have three children. Her husband's grandfather was also from Wallonia.

== Public activities ==
Susanne Laschet became the First Lady of Germany's largest state North Rhine-Westphalia in 2017. As First Lady she was active in philanthropic work. She is the patron of the Müttergenesungswerk, a charitable organisation founded by the First Lady of Germany Elly Heuss-Knapp. She is also the patron of Aktion Lichtblicke.

In 2020 her husband became a candidate to the chairmanship of the CDU and to succeed Angela Merkel as Chancellor of Germany, and was reportedly the candidate favoured by Merkel. However, he still lost.
