= Kunststiftung NRW =

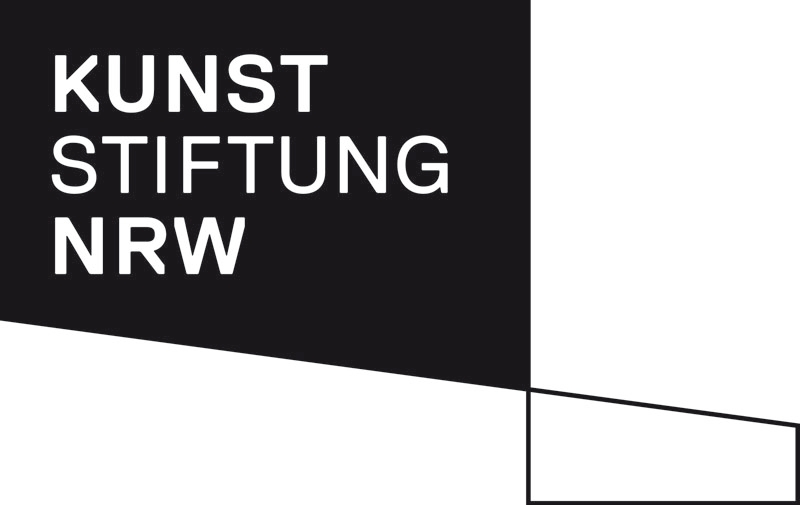
Logo

Kunststiftung NRW (Art Foundation NRW) is a foundation created by the government of the German state North Rhine-Westphalia. It was established on September 12, 1989, and started operations in the spring of 1990. It is based in Düsseldorf, Germany.

The functions of the foundation are:

- Promotion and cooperation in extraordinary projects of presentation and documentation of art and culture in North Rhine-Westphalia;
- Promotion and acquisition of art objects of extraordinary significance for North Rhine-Westphalia;
- Encouragement of talented young artists; and
- Promotion of international cultural exchange.
