= Jan Heinisch =

German politician (born 1976)

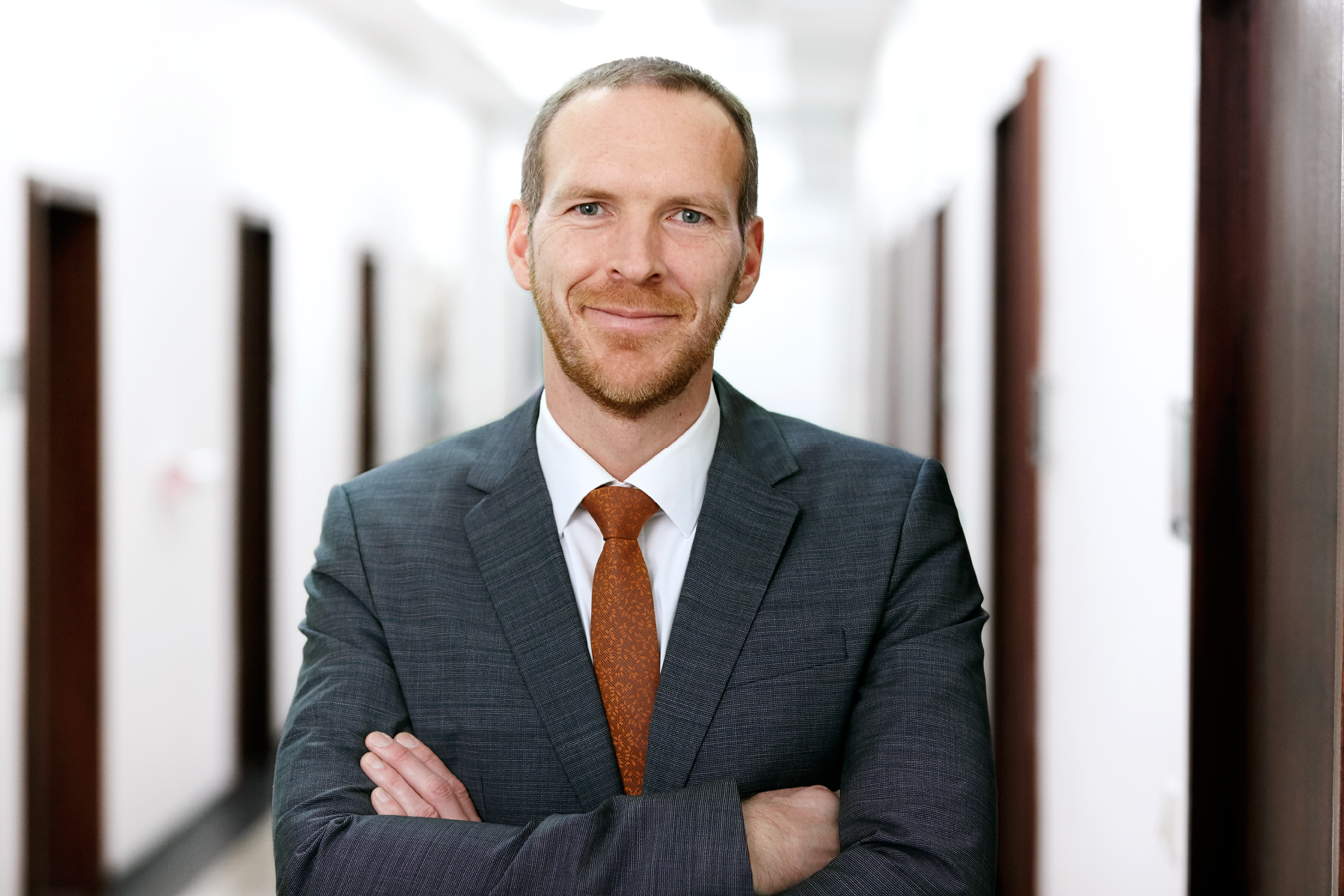
- Heinisch in 2020

Member of the Landtag of North Rhine-Westphalia
- Incumbent
- Assumed office 1 June 2022
- Constituency: Mettmann III – Mülheim II
- In office 1 June 2017 – 29 June 2017
- Preceded by: Elisabeth Müller-Witt
- Succeeded by: Petra Vogt
- Constituency: Mettmann III – Mülheim II

Personal details
- Born: 1 May 1976 (age 50) Düsseldorf
- Party: Christian Democratic Union (since 1993)

Jan Volker Heinisch (born 1 May 1976 in Düsseldorf) is a German politician. He has been a member of the Landtag of North Rhine-Westphalia since 2022, having previously served in 2017. From 2004 to 2017, he served as mayor of Heiligenhaus.
