= Ursula Heinen-Esser =

German politician (born 1965)

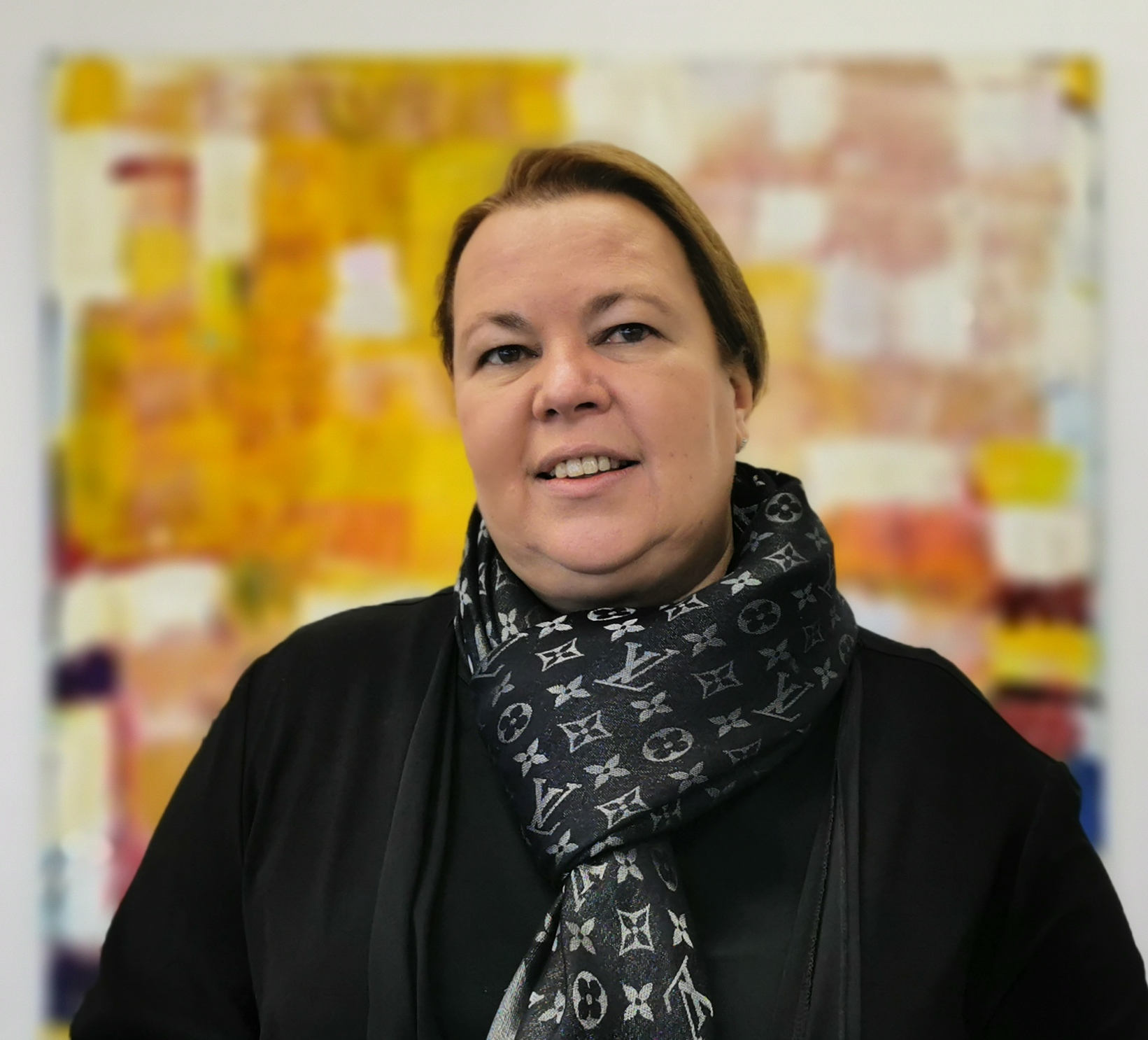
- Heinen-Esser in 2021

Member of the Bundestag
- In office 26 October 1998 – 22 October 2013
- Constituency: North Rhine-Westphalia

Personal details
- Born: 7 October 1965 (age 60) Cologne
- Party: Christian Democratic Union (since 1983)

Ursula Heinen-Esser (born 7 October 1965 in Cologne) is a German politician. From 2018 to 2022, she served as minister of the environment, agriculture, nature conservation and consumer protection of North Rhine-Westphalia. From 1998 to 2013, she was a member of the Bundestag.
