= Armin Laschet =

German politician (born 1961)

Armin Laschet MdB
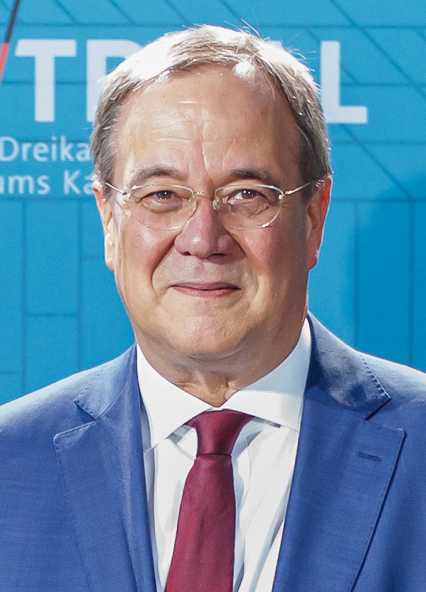
- Laschet in 2021

Leader of the Christian Democratic Union
- In office 22 January 2021 – 22 January 2022
- Deputy: Jens Spahn; Thomas Strobl; Volker Bouffier; Julia Klöckner; Silvia Breher
- General Secretary: Paul Ziemiak
- Preceded by: Annegret Kramp-Karrenbauer
- Succeeded by: Friedrich Merz

Minister-President of North Rhine-Westphalia
- In office 27 June 2017 – 26 October 2021
- Deputy: Joachim Stamp
- Preceded by: Hannelore Kraft
- Succeeded by: Hendrik Wüst
Other political offices
Chair of the Bundestag Foreign Affairs Committee
Incumbent
Assumed office 21 May 2025
| Preceded by | Michael Roth |
Deputy Leader of the Christian Democratic Union
In office 5 December 2012 – 22 January 2021 Serving with Volker Bouffier, Julia Klöckner, Silvia Breher and Thomas Strobl
| Leader | Angela Merkel; Annegret Kramp-Karrenbauer |
| General Secretary | Bodo Löttgen; Josef Hovenjürgen |
| Preceded by | Norbert Röttgen |
| Succeeded by | Jens Spahn |
Leader of the Christian Democratic Union in North Rhine-Westphalia
In office 20 June 2012 – 23 October 2021
| Deputy | Ralph Brinkhaus; Karl-Josef Laumann; Jan Heinisch; Ina Scharrenbach; Elisabeth Winkelmeier-Becker |
| Preceded by | Norbert Röttgen |
| Succeeded by | Hendrik Wüst |
Minister for Federal Affairs, Europe and the Media of North Rhine-Westphalia
In office 9 March 2010 – 15 July 2010
| Minister-President | Jürgen Rüttgers |
| Preceded by | Andreas Krautscheid |
| Succeeded by | Angelica Schwall-Düren |
Minister for Generations, Family, Women and Integration of North Rhine-Westphalia
In office 22 June 2005 – 15 July 2010
| Minister-President | Jürgen Rüttgers |
| Preceded by | Birgit Fischer (Health, Social affairs, Women and Family); Ute Schäfer (School, Youth and Children) |
| Succeeded by | Guntram Schneider (Work, Integration and Social affairs); Ute Schäfer (Family, Children, Youth, Culture and Sport) |
Parliamentary offices
Member of the Bundestag; from North Rhine-Westphalia
Incumbent
Assumed office 26 October 2021
| Preceded by | Multi-member district |
| Constituency | State list (2021–2025); Aachen I (2025–present) |
In office 10 November 1994 – 26 October 1998
| Preceded by | Hans Stercken |
| Succeeded by | Ulla Schmidt |
| Constituency | Aachen |
Member of the Landtag of North Rhine-Westphalia
In office 9 June 2010 – 27 October 2021
| Preceded by | Claudia Middendorf |
| Succeeded by | Rainer Spiecker |
| Constituency | Aachen II (2010–2012); State list (2012–2017); Aachen II (2017–2021) |
Member of the European Parliament for Germany
In office 20 July 1999 – 29 June 2005
| Preceded by | Multi-member district |
| Succeeded by | Jürgen Zimmerling |

Personal details
- Born: 18 February 1961 (age 65) Aachen, West Germany
- Party: Christian Democratic Union
- Spouse: Susanne Malangré (m. 1985)
- Children: 3
- Relatives: Heinrich Malangré (father-in-law)
- Education: LMU Munich; University of Bonn
- Occupation: Politician; Lawyer
- Website: Official website

Armin Laschet (German: [ˈaʁmiːn ˈlaʃət]; born 18 February 1961) is a German politician who served as Minister President of North Rhine-Westphalia from 2017 to 2021 and as Leader of the Christian Democratic Union (CDU) from 2021 to 2022. He was a candidate for Chancellor of Germany in 2021.

Laschet earned a law degree and worked as a journalist before and during his early political career. In 1994 he was elected to the Bundestag and in 1999 he became a Member of the European Parliament. In 2005 he entered state politics in North Rhine-Westphalia as a member of the state government. In 2012 he became leader of the state party, and he was elected Prime Minister of the state in 2017. His Cabinet consisted of members of his own CDU and the liberal Free Democratic Party (FDP).

In January 2021, Laschet was elected leader of the CDU, winning 52.8% of delegates votes against Friedrich Merz in the second round of the contest. The result of the election was certified by postal vote of the party conference's delegates with the final result announced on 22 January. It was confirmed on 20 April 2021 that he would be the CDU/CSU candidate for Chancellor of Germany at the 2021 German federal election, after rival Markus Söder conceded.

He was born to an observant Roman Catholic family of German-speaking Walloon origin; his father's parents were both of Belgian origin. He is married to Susanne Malangré, whom he met in a Catholic children's choir when they were children and who is a member of a prominent Aachen political family of French-speaking Walloon origin.

On 9 February 2024, he was awarded an honorary doctorate from TED University.

Laschet is a lecturer for political science at LMU Munich.

== Early life and education ==
Laschet was born in Burtscheid, a suburb of Aachen, about three kilometres from the Belgian and Dutch borders, to parents Heinrich Laschet and Marcella née Frings; he was raised in an observant Roman Catholic family. His father was a mining engineer at a black coal mine and later became an elementary school teacher and headmaster. The Laschet family is originally from Liège Province in Wallonia in modern Belgium where the family's ancestor Jacques (or Jacob) Laschet lived in Hergenrath in the Duchy of Limburg in the 18th century; his paternal grandfather Hubert Laschet (1899–1984) moved from Hergenrath to Aachen in the 1920s; (Note: Hergenrath was historically part of the Duchy of Limburg, one of the provinces of the Burgundian Netherlands. The duchy was multilingual, with Dutch, French, and German dialects spoken. The area was annexed by France at the end of the 18th century, then awarded to Prussia by the Congress of Vienna, and became part of Belgium after World War I. It is now part of the Belgian Liège Province and forms part of the German-speaking Community of Belgium.) his paternal grandmother Hubertina Wetzels (1900–1979) had been born in Aachen to parents who had just moved there from Welkenraedt in Belgium. Like many others in the tri-border area the Laschets had relatives across the national boundaries, who lived in Belgium, The Netherlands, Germany and Neutral Moresnet. Laschet maintains close personal ties to Belgium where members of the Laschet family still live.

He attended the Pius-Gymnasium in Aachen and studied law at the University of Bonn and LMU Munich, passing the first state examination in law in 1987. He studied journalism from 1986 to 1988. In Munich, he became a member of K.D.St.V. Aenania München, a Catholic student fraternity that is member of the Cartellverband.

Laschet speaks fluent French.

Laschet worked as a journalist and in the publishing industry from 1986 until 1991, among other things as Bonn correspondent for Bayerischer Rundfunk. He later served as editor-in-chief of the Catholic newspaper KirchenZeitung Aachen from 1991 until 1994. From 1995 to 1999, while also serving as a member of parliament, he was CEO of the Catholic publishing company Einhard-Verlag, which had previously been led by his father-in-law Heinrich Malangré.

== Political career ==
=== Member of the German Bundestag (1994–1998) ===
After serving as staffer to the President of the Bundestag, Laschet became a member of the German Bundestag in the 1994 election. He was elected in the single-member constituency of Aachen I, after the incumbent Hans Stercken retired. He was on the Committee for Economic Cooperation and Development and on the Committee for European Union Affairs. In addition, he was part of the so-called "Pizza-Connection" (a reference to an American drug ring). A number of informal meeting of a group of young Bundestag Members from both the CDU and the Greens. This was later seen as controversial, because it solidified an image of him as a liberal/centrist member of the CDU. He lost re-election in the 1998 SPD landslide to future Health Minister Ulla Schmidt.

=== Member of the European Parliament (1999–2005) ===
As Member of the European Parliament, Laschet served on the Committee on Budgets between 1999 and 2001 and on the Committee on Foreign Affairs between 2002 and 2005. In the latter capacity, he served as the Parliament's rapporteur on relations between the EU and the United Nations.

=== Role in state politics ===
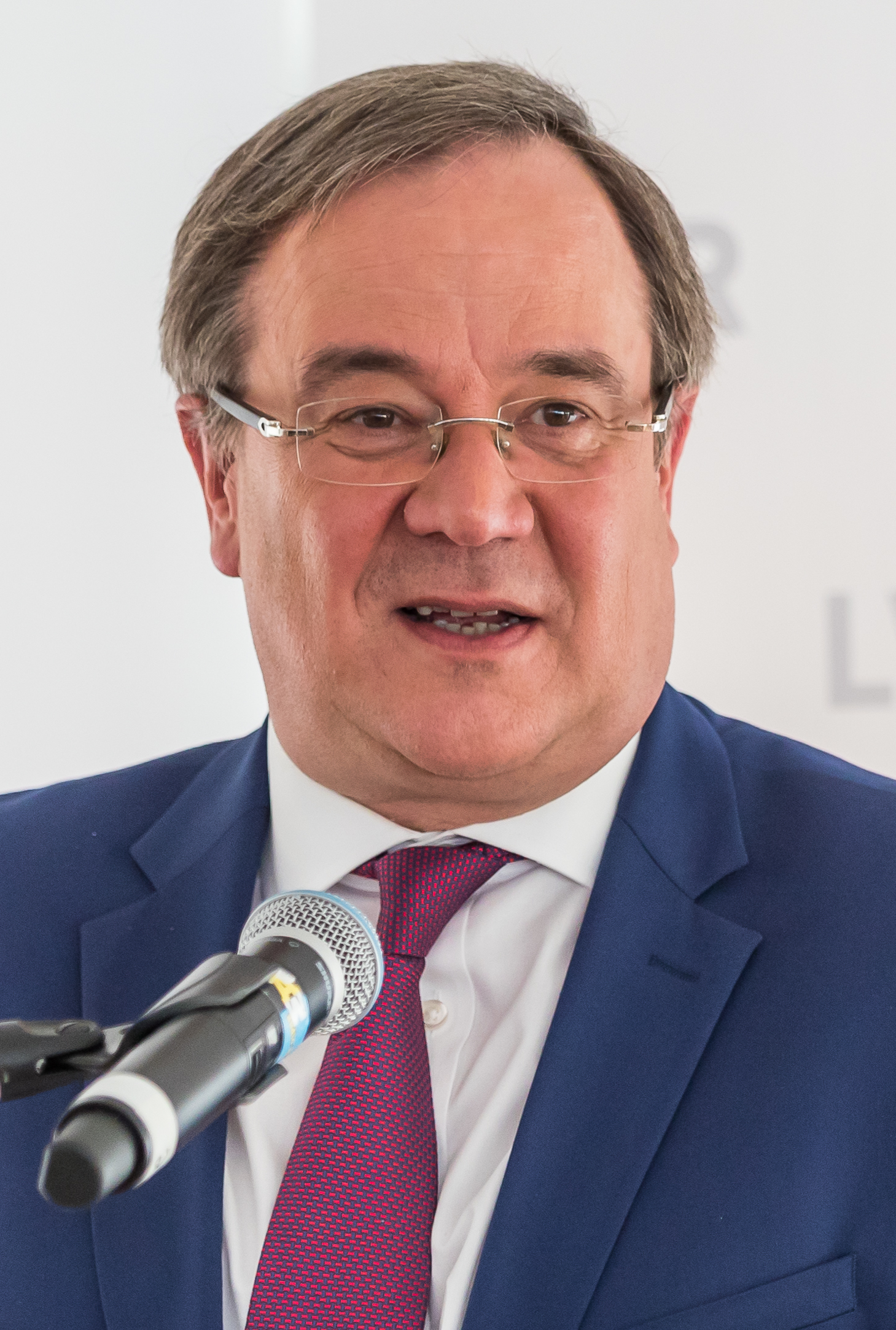
Laschet in 2018

Under Minister President Jürgen Rüttgers in North Rhine-Westphalia, Laschet served as State Minister for Generations, Family, Women and Integration from 2005 until 2010, and as State Minister for Federal Affairs, Europe and Media from 2010. In 2010, he unsuccessfully ran against Norbert Röttgen for the post of CDU chairman in the state. When Röttgen resigned from that office in 2012, Laschet was elected as his successor. On 4 December 2012, he was elected as one of five deputy chairpersons of the national CDU party, serving alongside Volker Bouffier, Julia Klöckner, Thomas Strobl and Ursula von der Leyen.

Laschet currently serves as state MP in the Landtag of North Rhine-Westphalia and also chairs the CDU's state chapter (Landesverband). From 2014 until 2016, he was a member of the North Rhine-Westphalia Commission for Constitutional Reform, led by Rainer Bovermann.

In the negotiations to form a Grand Coalition of the Christian Democrats (CDU together with the Bavarian CSU) and the Social Democrats (SPD) following the 2013 federal elections, Laschet was part of the CDU/CSU delegation in the working group on energy policy, led by Peter Altmaier and Hannelore Kraft.

In November 2015, Laschet visited the Zaatari refugee camp in Jordan to learn more about the plight of Syrians fleeing the violence in the ongoing Syrian civil war that erupted in 2011. Between March 2015 and January 2016, he chaired the Robert Bosch Expert Commission to Consider a Realignment of Refugee Policy, an expert group convened by the Robert Bosch Stiftung.

In November 2016, Laschet was elected leading candidate for the North Rhine-Westphalia state elections in May 2017 which he won in what was widely considered an upset victory. He was a CDU delegate to the Federal Convention for the purpose of electing the President of Germany in 2017.

In December 2016, Laschet presided over the CDU's national convention in Essen.

=== Minister President of North Rhine-Westphalia (2017–2021) ===
Laschet served as the 11th Minister President of North Rhine-Westphalia from 2017 to 2021. Laschet's government was a coalition between the Christian Democratic Union (CDU) and the Free Democratic Party (FDP). As one of his state's representatives at the Bundesrat, he serves as a member of the Federal Committee on Foreign Affairs and the Defence Committee.

=== Leader of the CDU (2021–2022) ===
Following Annegret Kramp-Karrenbauer's announcement on 10 February 2020 that she would step down as CDU party leader before the end of 2020 and would not stand as a candidate for chancellor in the 2021 federal elections, Laschet announced at a national press conference on 25 February 2020 that he would run for the party presidency, and thus also for the chancellorship. He named Jens Spahn as his vice-presidential candidate, with Friedrich Merz and Norbert Röttgen as his challengers.

Polls subsequently showed that voters rated Laschet's management of the COVID-19 pandemic in Germany's most populous state poorly.

The election of the new CDU party president, after several postponements due to the coronavirus epidemic, took place only at the two-day party congress in mid-January 2021, which was the first fully digital congress in the party's history. On the second day of the congress, 16 January 2021, Laschet won 38.42% of the votes in the first round and 52.79% in the second round. He thus became the new president of the CDU.

After his defeat at the head of his party in the federal elections, he resigned from the party leadership on 7 October. His place was taken by Merz, who finally succeeded in his third attempt, in the election of the party president on 17 December 2021.

=== CDU/CSU joint candidate for Chancellor ===
However, the strong intra-party divisions that were also evident in the vote could have led to a joint CDU/CSU chancellorship candidacy for Markus Söder, the president of the smaller Bavarian sister party, the CSU. Polls conducted immediately before the party congress showed that 55 percent of voters considered Söder a good candidate for chancellor, while 80 percent of CDU/CSU supporters thought he was a good candidate, compared to only 27 percent and 32 percent respectively for Laschet.

Söder opted for a wait-and-see strategy, finally announcing at a press conference in Munich on 19 April 2021 that he would not delay the nomination of his candidate for chancellor as the federal elections approached, and that he and his party, the CSU, would therefore accept the decision of the CDU's "big sister" executive board meeting, which began that day, as binding on both him and his party, the CSU. Subsequently, following a late-night meeting of the CDU leadership in Berlin, it was announced that in a secret ballot, 77.5 percent of those present at the meeting had finally backed Laschet, compared to just 22.5 percent for Söder. Thus, it was a foregone conclusion that Armin Laschet would be in the running to become chancellor of the CDU/CSU coalition in September 2021. Asked why he did not step aside from his own candidacy for chancellor, as polls had shown that he had significantly worse chances than the CSU president, Laschet said he remembered it well, that during the campaign for the 2017 North Rhine-Westphalian state parliamentary elections in North Rhine-Westphalia, when he was given similarly low odds by pollsters against the then incumbent SPD state premier Hannelore Kraft, he still won the election.

=== Campaign to win the Chancellorship ===
Subsequently, Laschet tried to "channel" the far greater popularity of his biggest rival within the CDU by recruiting Merz to his campaign team, saying that he "belonged in the team" and that his economic and financial expertise would be crucial in helping them to overcome the huge challenge of the pandemic in a sustainable way.

Already at the party congress in Rhineland-Palatinate in May 2021, Laschet called for the Greens to be the main political opponent in the upcoming election campaign. He set the goal of preventing the formation of a Red–Red–Green (SPD–Left–Greens) coalition.

As his party's candidate to succeed Merkel in the national elections, Laschet was initially seen as having made an uncertain start to his campaign and faced calls to chart a more right-wing course to win back voters disenchanted by the incumbent coalition government. However, the party's win in the Saxony-Anhalt elections was later interpreted as a boost to Laschet.

Laschet presented the joint CDU/CSU election platform with Söder on 21 June 2021. In the programme, they stated that combating the pandemic, climate change and defending prosperity and freedom are global challenges, and that their goal is to create a Germany open to the world, which strives for both modernisation and green policies.

While visiting Erftstadt, a flood-hit town, Laschet was caught laughing on camera and came under fire later despite his apology that 'It was stupid and shouldn't have happened and I regret it'. This was a decisive factor in the fact that all but 7 percent of those surveyed were positive about the provincial premier's management of the flood crisis. Following this incident, CDU/CSU suffered heavily in opinion polls and SPD took the lead. Laschet faced another scandal at the end of the month, when it emerged that he, like his fellow Green Party candidate for chancellor Annalena Baerbock, was facing accusations of plagiarism. Die Aufsteigerrepublik. Zuwanderung als Chance, was written in 2009 and he finally admitted his "mistake", and apologised.

=== Federal election ===
In the 2021 German federal election on 26 September, Laschet had to compete for the post of Chancellor against Olaf Scholz of the SPD. He did not contest an individual constituency. His home constituency of Aachen I, which he had represented from 1994 to 1998 and was expected to be his constituency, swung to the Greens on election day.

Opinion poll predictions came true, with the SPD winning the most votes (25.7%), while the CDU/CSU had their worst result ever (24.1%). His former constituency of Aachen I, which he had represented from 1994 to 1998, swung to the Greens on election day. Alliance 90/The Greens finished third with 14.8%, just ahead of the FDP with 11.5%, and both became the "kingmakers". Two months later, they came together with the SDP to form a coalition and Olaf Scholz was elected chancellor. Following the election, Laschet claimed personal responsibility for the party's loss.

=== Post-leadership ===
After the election, Laschet resigned as Minister President of North Rhine-Westphalia on 25 October 2021 in order to resume his membership of the Bundestag. He also resigned as the Leader of the CDU and was replaced by Friedrich Merz, who had won the leadership contest. He remained a member of the Bundestag after being re-elected on the North Rhine-Westphalia party list and sat on multiple subcommittees. He was nominated as the CDU's candidate for his former constituency of Aachen I in the 2025 German federal election.

Since 2025, Laschet has been serving as chairman of the German Parliament's Committee on Foreign Affairs.

== Political positions ==
=== Environment and climate change ===
Laschet has been criticised for hesitancy in efforts to mitigate climate change. As Minister President of North Rhine-Westphalia he claimed that the state was a "pioneer" in climate protection. Environmental organisations have rebuked this claim. During his tenure, the expansion of wind power collapsed in North Rhine-Westphalia, so that only a third of the originally planned turbines were built. His state government also allowed the phaseout of three coal-fired power plants to last until 2038.

In 2018, shortly after taking over as Minister President of North Rhine-Westphalia, Laschet supported the minister of the environment Christina Schulze Föcking's decision to dismantle the state's administrative department for environmental crimes. Public broadcaster WDR reported that prior to its dismantling the department had been investigating accusations over pig farming at the farm of Schulze Föcking's family.

During the 2021 floods in the district of Ahrweiler, he said, "One does not change one's politics because today is such a day."

=== European integration ===
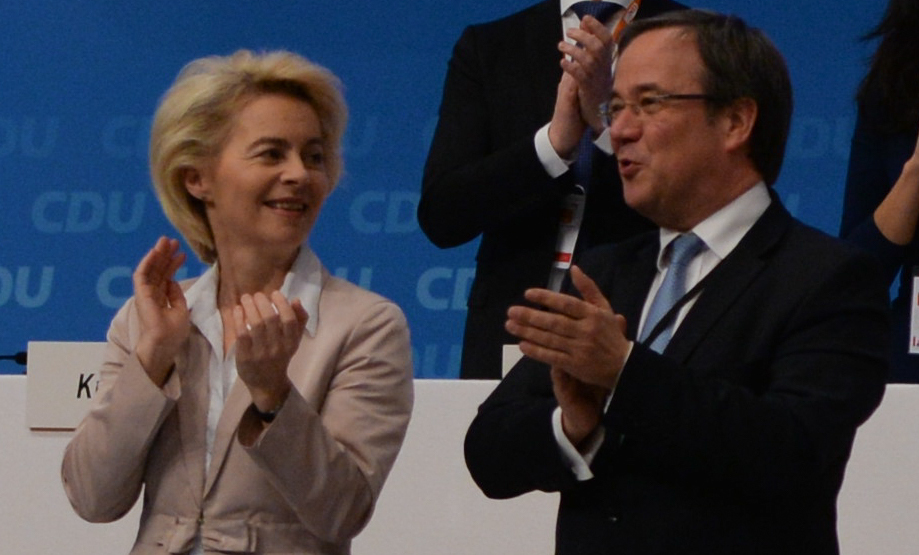
Laschet with the President of the European Commission, Ursula von der Leyen in 2015, while they were deputy leaders of the CDU

On European integration, Laschet seeks to strengthen the European Union on issues such as fighting international terrorism and organized crime, as well as energy policy. He also wants to see the President of the European Commission be elected directly by EU voters.

During the European debt crisis, Laschet called for an "open discussion" toward a broad solution to the debt crisis, of which Eurobonds could be a part. He argued that a Greek exit from the Eurozone could trigger undesirable upheaval in southern Europe: "(An exit) could lead to instability in a NATO member state. Russia is standing ready with billions to help Greece in such a scenario." In October 2011, he signed George Soros' open letter calling for more European Union involvement in the single currency turmoil.

In 2020 alone, Laschet met with French president Emmanuel Macron three times. Alongside Jens Spahn, Laschet was invited by Macron of France to attend the 2020 Bastille Day celebrations in Paris, in a sign of gratitude for their role in helping French citizens during the COVID-19 pandemic in France. In an honour reserved for special guests, Macron invited Laschet into the Élysée Palace's gardens.

=== Social policy ===
Laschet was a fierce defender of Chancellor Merkel's migration policies during the European migrant crisis of 2015.

In 2016, Laschet dismissed proposals for a so-called burqa ban as a "phony debate" and distraction from more pressing issues. However, his party later adopted this policy as a core issue.

Ahead of a parliamentary vote in June 2017, Laschet expressed his opposition against Germany's introduction of same-sex marriage, going so far as to say it would be unconstitutional. During the 2021 German federal election Laschet gave a different position in a town hall, where he claimed he would have voted in favour of same-sex marriage.

In 2018, Laschet described the treehouses protesting the destruction of Hambach forest as "illegally occupied areas" and stated that RWE had the right to clear the forest. "The state government is there to ensure that the law that applies is enforced," he said during a talk show on German public broadcaster WDR.

=== Foreign policy ===
Laschet considers Germany to be insufficiently prepared for global political challenges. In his view, the country lacks the will to pursue a foreign policy that is independent of other major powers such as Russia or the US. Laschet also hopes for more strategic thinking and action from the EU, saying it "must become fit for global politics."

In 2015, Laschet was criticised for not standing up for German interests when it was revealed that US intelligence agencies are illegally spying on German citizens and businesses. German experts estimate that by the year 2000, American industrial espionage was already causing annual economic losses of at least €10 billion per year due to stolen inventions and development projects – the number having likely only risen since then due to the increase of digitisation. Despite these revelations, Laschet supported Angela Merkel's policy, which in leaked cables was revealed to be to "sit out" the pressure from the German public and Bundestag.

Laschet is considered by some critics as taking a soft stance on the government of President Vladimir Putin. Laschet has voiced support for Nord Stream 2 and for a closer relationship with China and is against excluding Huawei from Germany's 5G network. However, Germany's Federal Office for Information Security has supported Laschet's position, saying that comprehensive investigations into Huawei's hardware and software have produced no evidence of wrongdoing and that an exclusion is unjustified. Barkin further argues that Laschet has also been against "demonizing" Putin for the Russian annexation of Crimea. At the same time, Laschet said that Germany should increase military spending and take on a greater share of military burdens within NATO. He argued that the Bundeswehr should take on more responsibility in Africa, around the Mediterranean and in Mali.

In 2018, Laschet cancelled his appearances at the Ruhrtriennale arts and music festival due to the festival allowing supporters of the BDS movement to perform. In 2021, he pledged support for Israel: "We stand by Israel's side without reservation."

In 2013, Laschet criticised Foreign Minister Guido Westerwelle's support for rebels in the civil war in Syria: "It is absurd that the same people we are fighting in Mali are being supported in Syria. It is the terrorist groups al-Nusra and al-Qaida, financed from Qatar and Saudi Arabia, who are introducing Sharia courts and fighting Syria's religious diversity". In 2013, Laschet also criticised Westerwelle's demand to release former President Mohammed Mursi after the coup in Egypt in 2013, as minorities and Christians in particular had suffered under Mursi.

Laschet described the chaotic withdrawal of Western troops from Afghanistan and Fall of Kabul to the Taliban in August 2021 as the "biggest debacle that NATO has suffered since its founding".

In November 2023, Laschet criticised the German federal government for not voting against United Nations General Assembly Resolution ES-10/21. In December 2023, Laschet criticised the invocation of article 99 of the UN Charta due to the 2023 Gaza humanitarian crisis by Secretary-General of the United Nations António Guterres, as this would apply double standards and has the potential to discredit the UN: "This article was not drawn when 500,000 people died in Syria, not when Russia attacked Ukraine, or when there were hundreds of thousands of civilian casualties in the Yemen war."

== Personal life ==
Laschet is married to his childhood sweetheart Susanne Malangré, whom he met as a child in a Catholic children's choir led by Susanne's father, prominent business executive Heinrich Malangré; they married in 1985. The couple has two sons and a daughter. The family resides in Aachen's Burtscheid district. His wife belongs to a prominent Aachen family of French-speaking Walloon origin and is the niece of CDU politician and lord mayor of Aachen Kurt Malangré; the Malangré family moved from Haine-Saint-Pierre in Belgium to Stolberg to establish a glass production business in the second half of the 19th century. His son Johannes ("Joe") Laschet, who studies law, is a blogger and model, described as a fashion influencer on Instagram. He is a Roman Catholic.

== Other activities ==
=== Corporate boards ===
- RAG-Stiftung, Member of the Board of Trustees (since 2017), Chair of the Board of Trustees (since 2022)

=== Non-profit organizations ===
- Heinz-Kühn-Stiftung, Member of the Board of Trustees (since 2023)
- Tarabya Cultural Academy, Member of the advisory board (since 2022)
- Leo Baeck Foundation, Member of the Board of Trustees (since 2022)
- Atlantik-Brücke, Member
- Bonner Akademie für Forschung und Lehre praktischer Politik (BAPP), Member of the Board of Trustees, Joint President of the Board of Trustees
- Campus Symposium of the Business and Information Technology School, Member of the Advisory Board
- Central Committee of German Catholics, Member
- Charlemagne Prize, Member of the board of directors
- European Academy of Sciences and Arts, Member
- European Foundation for the Aachen Cathedral, Member of the Board of Trustees
- Institute for the Study of Labor (IZA), Policy Fellow
- Karl Arnold Foundation, Member of the Board
- Konrad Adenauer Foundation, Member of the Planning Committee
- Peace of Westphalia Prize, Member of the Jury
- missio, Member of the Supervisory Board
- St. Maria zur Wiese, Member of the Board of Trustees
- United Nations Association of Germany (DGVN), Member of the Presidium
- Development and Peace Foundation (SEF), Ex-Officio chairman of the board of Trustees (2017–2021)
- Kunststiftung NRW, chairman of the board of Trustees (2017–2021)
- North Rhine-Westphalian Foundation for the Environment and Development (SUE), Ex-Officio chairman of the board (2017–2021)
- Theodor Heuss Foundation, Member of the Board of Trustees (−2015)

== Notes ==
Political offices
| Preceded by Hannelore Kraft | Minister President of North Rhine-Westphalia; 2017–2021 | Succeeded by Hendrik Wüst |
Party political offices
| Preceded by Annegret Kramp-Karrenbauer | Leader of the Christian Democratic Union; 2021–2022 | Succeeded by Friedrich Merz |
