= Ina Scharrenbach =

German politician (born 1976)

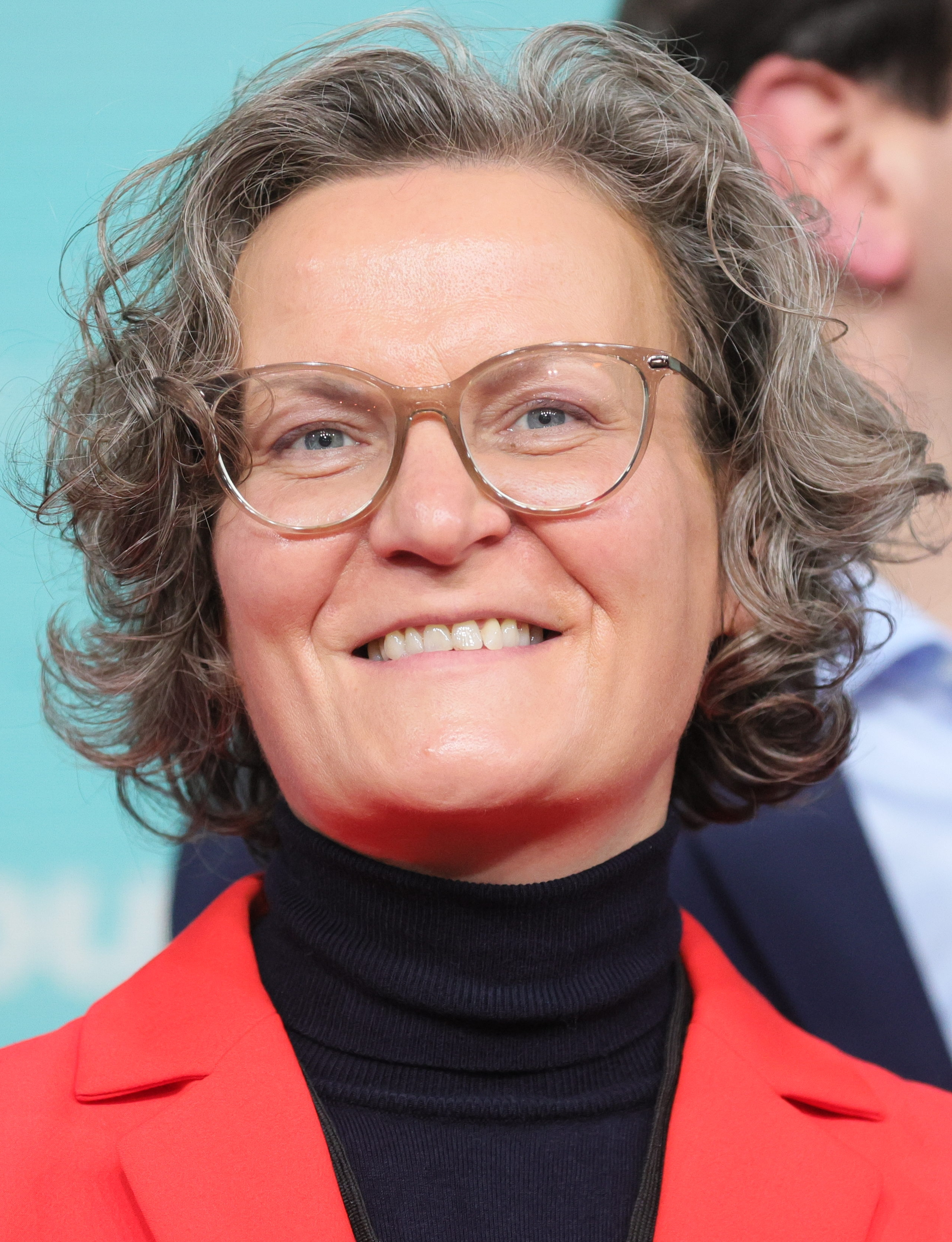
- Scharrenbach in 2025

Minister of Home Affairs, Local Government, Construction and Digitalization of North Rhine-Westphalia
- Incumbent
- Assumed office 29 June 2022
- Minister-President: Hendrik Wüst

Personal details
- Born: 30 September 1976 (age 49)
- Party: Christian Democratic Union (since 1996)

Ina Scharrenbach (born 30 September 1976) is a German politician serving as minister of home affairs, local government, construction and digitalization of North Rhine-Westphalia since 2022. From 2017 to 2022, she served as minister of home affairs, local government, construction and equal opportunities. She has been a member of the Landtag of North Rhine-Westphalia since 2022, having previously served from 2012 to 2017.
