= Minister-President of North Rhine-Westphalia =

Head of government of the German state of North Rhine-Westphalia (NRW)

- Ministerpräsident des Landes Nordrhein-Westfalen
- Coat of arms

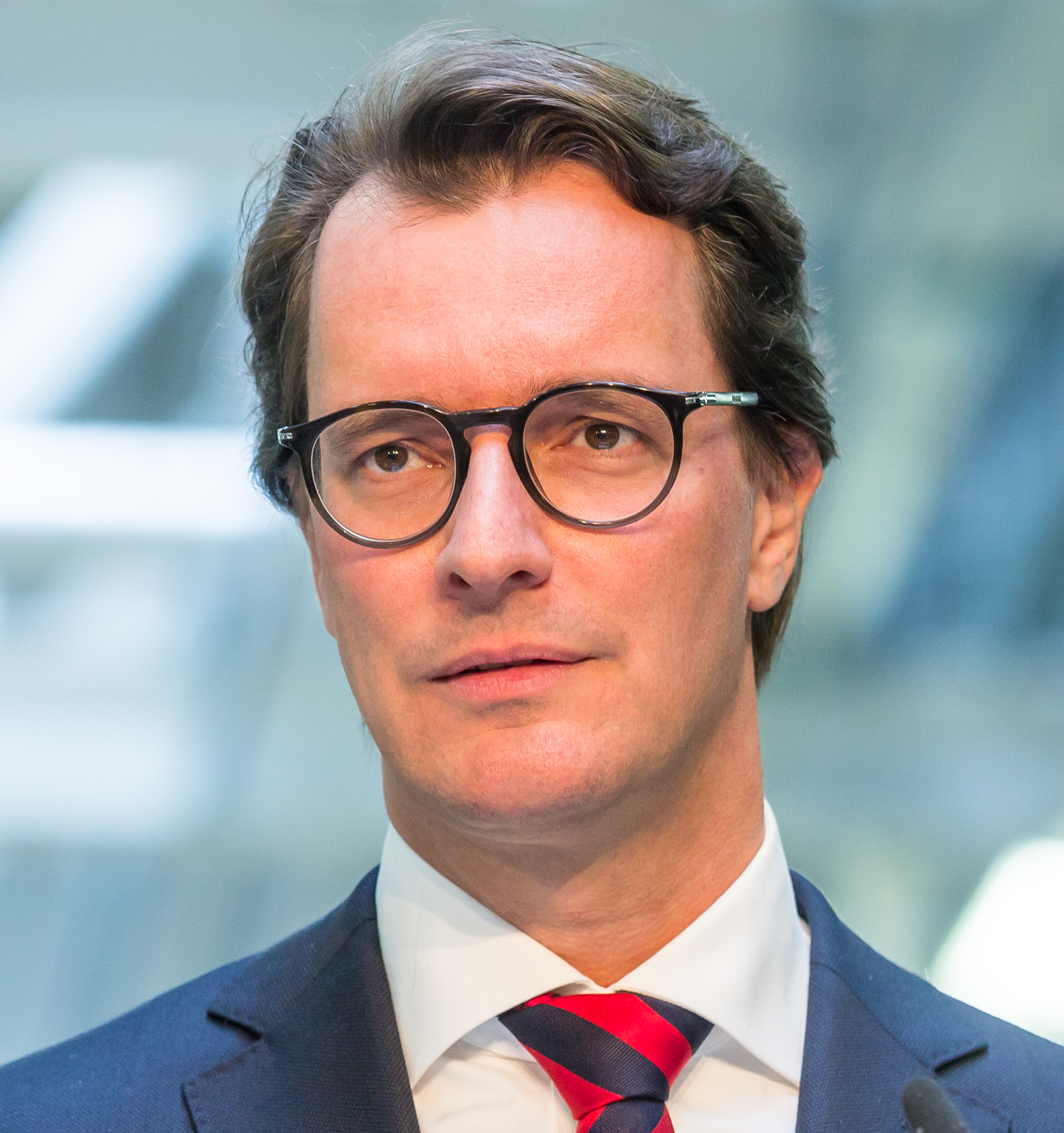
- Incumbent; Hendrik Wüst since 27 October 2021
- Status: Head of state; Head of government
- Member of: Cabinet; Landtag
- Residence: State Chancellery
- Nominator: President of the Landtag
- Appointer: Landtag of North Rhine-Westphalia
- Inaugural holder: Rudolf Amelunxen
- Formation: 24 July 1946
- Deputy: Mona Neubaur
- Salary: €210,000 per annum
- Website: Official website

The minister-president of North Rhine-Westphalia (German: Ministerpräsident des Landes Nordrhein-Westfalen), also referred to as the premier or prime minister, is the head of government of the German state of North Rhine-Westphalia (NRW). The position was created in 1946, when the British administration merged the Prussian provinces of Westphalia and the northern part of the Prussian province of the Rhine (North Rhine) to form the state of North Rhine-Westphalia. In 1947, the state was expanded by the inclusion of the state of Lippe.

The current minister-president is Hendrik Wüst, heading a coalition government between the Christian Democratic Union and Alliance 90/The Greens. Wüst succeeded Armin Laschet following his resignation in 2021.

The office of the minister-president is known as the state chancellery (German: Staatskanzlei) and is located in the capital of Düsseldorf, along with the rest of the cabinet departments.

== Title ==
The German title Ministerpräsident can be translated literally as minister-president, although the state government sometimes uses the English title prime minister.

== Origin of the office ==
After the Second World War, the Prussian province of Westphalia and the northern part of the Prussian province of the Rhine (North Rhine) were administered as part of the zone allocated to the British military administration, and were merged to form the state of North Rhine-Westphalia. In 1947, the state was expanded to include the state of Lippe. The British government began to back the advocates of a merger of the states.

== List ==
Political party: CDU SPD

Portrait	Name (Born–Died)	Term of office			Political party	Cabinet
Portrait	Name (Born–Died)	Took office	Left office	Days	Political party	Cabinet
1	Rudolf Amelunxen (1888–1969)	23 August 1946	17 June 1947	298 days	Non-partisan (until 1947)	I II
1	Rudolf Amelunxen (1888–1969)	23 August 1946	17 June 1947	298 days	Centre Party (from 1947)	I II
2	Karl Arnold (1901–1958)	17 June 1947	20 February 1956 replaced by a constructive vote of no confidence	8 years, 248 days	CDU	I II III
3	Fritz Steinhoff (1897–1969)	20 February 1956	21 July 1958	2 years, 151 days	SPD	I
4	Franz Meyers (1908–2002)	21 July 1958	8 December 1966 replaced by a constructive vote of no confidence	8 years, 140 days	CDU	I II III
5	Heinz Kühn (1912–1992)	8 December 1966	20 September 1978	11 years, 286 days	SPD	I II III
6	Johannes Rau (1931–2006)	20 September 1978	27 May 1998 resigned	19 years, 249 days	SPD	I II III IV V
7	Wolfgang Clement (1940–2020)	27 May 1998	22 October 2002 resigned	4 years, 148 days	SPD	I II
Deputy Minister-President Michael Vesper (Alliance 90/The Greens) served as acting Minister-President from 22 October to 6 November 2002
8	Peer Steinbrück (born 1947)	6 November 2002	22 June 2005	2 years, 228 days	SPD	I
9	Jürgen Rüttgers (born 1951)	22 June 2005	14 July 2010	5 years, 22 days	CDU	I
10	Hannelore Kraft (born 1961)	14 July 2010	27 June 2017	6 years, 348 days	SPD	I II
11	Armin Laschet (born 1961)	27 June 2017	26 October 2021 resigned	4 years, 121 days	CDU	I
Deputy Minister-President Joachim Stamp (FDP) served as acting Minister-President from 26 to 27 October 2021
12	Hendrik Wüst (born 1975)	27 October 2021	Incumbent	4 years, 329 days	CDU	I II

== See also ==
- North Rhine-Westphalia
- Politics of North Rhine-Westphalia
- Landtag of North Rhine-Westphalia
