= Hendrik Wüst =

German politician (born 1975)

Hendrik Wüst MdL MdBR
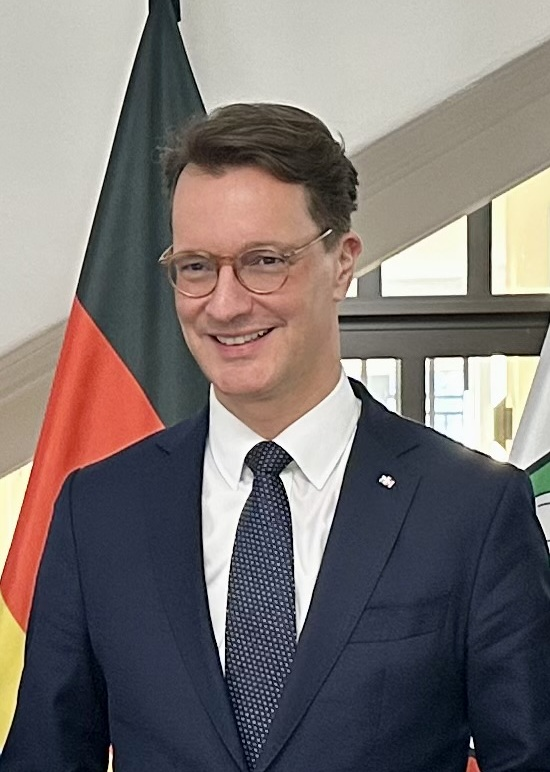
- Wüst in 2025

Minister-President of North Rhine-Westphalia
- Incumbent
- Assumed office 27 October 2021
- Deputy: Joachim Stamp; Mona Neubaur
- Preceded by: Armin Laschet

Leader of the Christian Democratic Union of North Rhine-Westphalia
- Incumbent
- Assumed office 23 October 2021
- General Secretary: Josef Hovenjürgen; Paul Ziemiak (acting)
- Deputy: Daniel Sieveke; Ina Scharrenbach; Sabine Verheyen; Elisabeth Winkelmeier-Becker; Herbert Reul
- Preceded by: Armin Laschet

Minister of Transport of North Rhine-Westphalia
- In office 30 June 2017 – 27 October 2021
- Minister-President: Armin Laschet
- Preceded by: Michael Groscheck
- Succeeded by: Ina Brandes

President of the Bundesrat
- Incumbent
- Assumed office 1 November 2026
- First Vice President: Andreas Bovenschulte
- Preceded by: Andreas Bovenschulte

General Secretary of the Christian Democratic Union of North Rhine-Westphalia
- In office 1 April 2006 – 22 February 2010
- Leader: Jürgen Rüttgers
- Preceded by: Hans-Joachim Reck
- Succeeded by: Oliver Wittke

Member of the Landtag of North Rhine-Westphalia for Borken I
- Incumbent
- Assumed office 8 June 2005
- Preceded by: Heinrich Kruse

Personal details
- Born: Hendrik Josef Wüst; 19 July 1975 (age 51) Rhede, North Rhine-Westphalia, West Germany (now Germany)
- Party: CDU (since 1990)
- Spouse: Katharina Starting (m. 2018)
- Children: 1
- Education: University of Münster
- Occupation: Politician; Lawyer; Businessman
- Website: Official website

Hendrik Josef Wüst (born 19 July 1975) is a German politician serving as Minister-President of the state of North Rhine-Westphalia since 2021. He is a member of the Christian Democratic Union (CDU). In October 2021, he succeeded Armin Laschet as state chairman of his party. Under Wüst's leadership, his party won the highest vote share in the 2022 North Rhine-Westphalia state election.

== Early life and education ==
Wüst was born in 1975 in the town of Rhede in North Rhine-Westphalia. In 1995, having obtained his Abitur, he began reading law at the University of Münster, qualifying as a lawyer in 2003.

== Political career ==
=== Beginnings ===
At the age of 15, Wüst co-founded the local branch of Junge Union (JU), the youth wing of the Christian Democratic Union (CDU), in his hometown. In 1994, he was elected to the city council of Rhede. He served as chairman of the JU in North Rhine-Westphalia from 2000 until 2006, which made him part of the CDU leadership in the state under chairman Jürgen Rüttgers.

=== Member of the State Parliament, 2005–present ===
Wüst was first elected to the State Parliament of North Rhine-Westphalia in the 2005 elections. In addition to his parliamentary work, he was employed by public affairs agency Eutop from 2000 until 2005. From 2006, Wüst served as the secretary general of the CDU in the state, under Rüttgers’ leadership. In 2010, he resigned from the post of secretary general. He took this step after it became known that the party had given preferential access to Rüttgers, then Minister-President of North Rhine-Westphalia, in return for payments. From 2010 until 2017, Wüst then worked for the North Rhine-Westphalia state chapter of the German Newspaper Publishers Association (BDZV) and for a private broadcaster.

From 2013, Wüst served as state chairman of the Mittelstands- und Wirtschaftsunion, a business lobby within the CDU. Following the 2017 state elections in North Rhine-Westphalia, Wüst was part of the CDU team in the negotiations with Christian Lindner’s FDP on a coalition agreement. He led his party's delegation in the working group on economic affairs and energy policy; his co-chair of the FDP was Andreas Pinkwart. In 2017, Wüst was appointed State Minister for Transport in the cabinet of Armin Laschet.

=== Minister President of North Rhine-Westphalia, 2021–present ===
On 5 October 2021, it was reported that Wüst would receive the endorsement of Laschet to succeed him as Minister President of North Rhine-Westphalia and state chairman of the CDU. On 23 October, he was elected to the state chairmanship of his party.

On 27 October 2021, Wüst was elected Minister President of North Rhine-Westphalia by the state parliament. As one of the state's representatives at the Bundesrat since 2021, Wüst serves on the Committee on Foreign Affairs and the Defense. During his first year as Minister-President, he also served as Commissioner of the Federal Republic of Germany for Cultural Affairs under the Treaty on Franco-German Cooperation. Wüst was nominated by his party as delegate to the Federal Convention for the purpose of electing the president of Germany in 2022.

In May 2022, the CDU received the highest vote share in the 2022 North Rhine-Westphalia state election, making Wüst the frontrunner to continue as the state's Minister-President. For the campaign, he had hired Angela Merkel's former advisors Eva Christiansen and Klaus Schüler. By 2023, the German press increasingly viewed Wüst as a potential CDU candidate for chancellor in elections scheduled for late 2025. In September 2024, Wüst decided not to run and announced his support for Friedrich Merz as Union's candidate for Chancellor of Germany for the 2025 federal election.

In his capacity as Minister-President, Wüst has made several foreign trips, including for meetings with Prime Minister Mark Rutte of the Netherlands (2022), Minister of Foreign Affairs Yoshimasa Hayashi of Japan (2023), the Emir of Qatar Tamim bin Hamad Al Thani (2025) and President Recep Tayyip Erdoğan of Turkey (2026).

== Political positions ==
According to Westdeutscher Rundfunk, Wüst is part of the conservative wing of the CDU. In 2007, a group of conservative politicians, including Wüst and Markus Söder (the future Minister President of Bavaria), published a white paper entitled Moderner bürgerlicher Konservatismus ("Modern Civic Conservatism"), which was described as a "token of insubordination" by the Frankfurter Allgemeine Zeitung.

== Other activities ==
=== Corporate boards ===
- RAG-Stiftung, Ex-Officio Member of the Board of Trustees (since 2021)

=== Nonprofit organizations ===
- Peace of Westphalia Prize, Member of the Jury (since 2022)
- German Foundation for Active Citizenship and Volunteering (DSEE), Member of the Board of Trustees (since 2021)
- Development and Peace Foundation (SEF), Ex-Officio Chair of the Board of Trustees (since 2021)
- Heinz Kühn Foundation, Ex-Officio Chair of the Board of Trustees (since 2021)
- Cultural Foundation of the German States (KdL), Member of the Council (since 2021)
- German Federal Cultural Foundation, Member of the Board of Trustees
- Kunststiftung NRW, Ex-Officio Chairman of the Board of Trustees (since 2021)
- North Rhine-Westphalian Foundation for the Environment and Development (SUE), Ex-Officio chairman of the board (since 2021)
- Brost Foundation, Member of the Board of Trustees
- Deutsches Museum, Member of the Board of Trustees
