= Rudolf Henke =

German politician

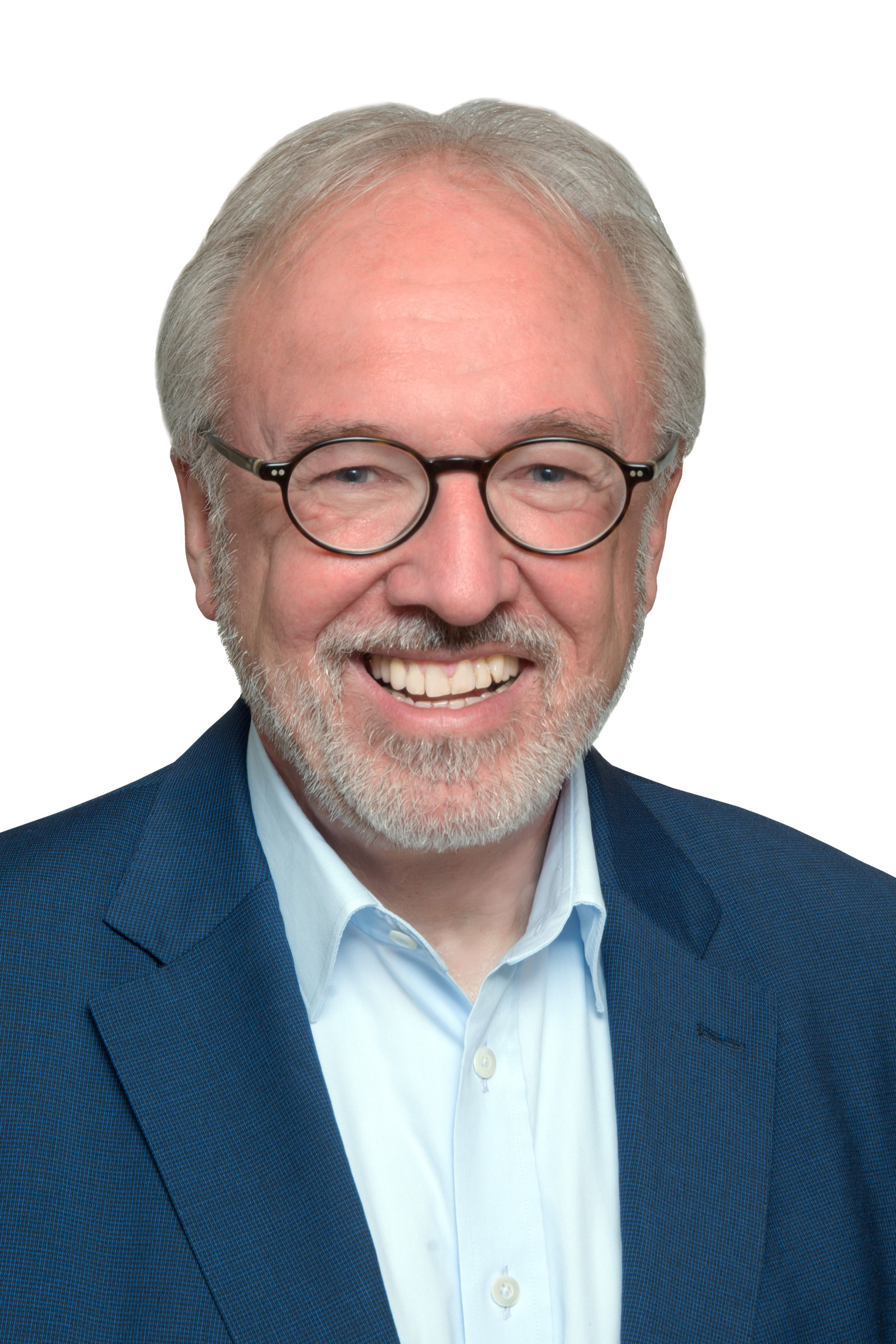
- Henke in 2013

Member of the Bundestag
- In office 27 October 2009 – 26 October 2021
- Preceded by: Ulla Schmidt
- Succeeded by: Oliver Krischer
- Constituency: Aachen (2009–2013); Aachen I (2013–2021)

Member of the; Landtag of North Rhine-Westphalia; for Aachen II
- In office 1 June 1995 – 20 November 2009
- Preceded by: Karl Schultheis
- Succeeded by: Andrea Milz

Personal details
- Born: Rudolf Paul Maria Henke; 5 June 1954 (age 72) Düren, West Germany
- Party: Christian Democratic Union
- Spouse: Eva
- Children: 4
- Education: RWTH Aachen University
- Website: www.rudolf-henke.de

Rudolf Paul Maria Henke (born 5 June 1954) is a physician and politician of the Christian Democratic Union (CDU) who served as a member of the German Bundestag from 2009 until 2021.

== Education and early career ==
Born in Düren, Henke completed his Abitur at the Stiftisches Gymnasium in Düren before studying medicine at RWTH Aachen University between 1972 and 1979. The following year, he became assistant physician at St Antonius Hospital in Eschweiler, rising to become a consultant in hematology and oncology in September 1988.

Henke has been on the board of directors of the physicians' trade union Marburger Bund since 1989, becoming chair in 2007. He is a German delegate to the World Medical Association.

== Political career ==
Henke joined the Christian Democratic Union (CDU) in 1992 and became a member of the Landtag of North Rhine-Westphalia in the 1995 state elections. He remained a member of the parliament until 2009, having been twice re-elected, holding positions on the Committee on Labour, Health and Social Affair and the Committee on Research and Technology. Between 2005 and 2009, he was deputy leader of the CDU parliamentary group.

Henke was directly elected to the Bundestag in the Aachen I constituency in 2009, receiving more votes than incumbent federal health minister Ulla Schmidt in the process. Throughout his time in parliament, he was a member of the Health Committee, serving as deputy chairman of the committee from 2014. Henke was re-elected in 2013. In the negotiations to form a coalition government under the leadership of Chancellor Angela Merkel following the 2017 federal elections, he was part of the working group on health policy, led by Hermann Gröhe, Georg Nüßlein and Malu Dreyer.

== Other activities ==
In addition to his political work, Henke holds various positions that have contributed to making him one of the highest-earning members of the Bundestag, including the following:

- Allianz Private Krankenversicherungs-Aktiengesellschaft (APKV), Deputy Chairman of the Medical Advisory Board
- Deutsche Apotheker- und Ärztebank, Member of the Advisory Board
- Deutsche Ärzteversicherung, Member of the Advisory Board
- Federal Association for Children with Heart Diseases (BVHK), Member of the Scientific Advisory Board
- German-Israeli Association (DIG), Member
- UNITE – Parliamentary Network to End HIV/AIDS, Viral Hepatitis and Other Infectious Diseases, Member (since 2017)

== Political positions ==
In June 2017, Henke voted against Germany's introduction of same-sex marriage.

Ahead of the 2021 Christian Democratic Union of Germany leadership election, Henke publicly endorsed Armin Laschet to succeed Annegret Kramp-Karrenbauer as the party’s chair.

== Personal life ==
Henke is married with four children, and lives in Burtscheid, Aachen. He was deputy chair of the CDU in the city between 1999 and 2013.
