= Unified European Left Group =

Council of Europe Assembly political group

Unified European Left Group (UEL) is a group in the Parliamentary Assembly of the Council of Europe, formed by 39 MPs from various centre-left and left-wing parties in 13 countries. Laura Castel (Spain) and George Loucaides (Cyprus) are Co-President of the group.

The UEL operates in the framework set out by PACE: to promote and protect human rights, rule of law and democracy. The Group is in particular inspired by the European Convention on Human Rights and the European Social Charter and by other conventions, arrangements and activities which promote and protect human dignity, social and gender equality, organized solidarity and sustainable development of the planet.

== Members ==
As of June 2026:

Country	Name	Party	Reports
(Spain)	Laura Castel	Republican Left of Catalonia	
(Cyprus)	George Loucaides	Progressive Party of Working People (AKEL)	Budget intergovernmental programme 2015, Political transition in Tunesia 2017, Budget and priorities of the Council of Europe for the biennium 2018-2019, Expenditure of the Parliamentary Assembly for the biennium 2018-2019, The honouring of membership obligations to the Council of Europe by Malta, for democracy in respect of the Parliament of Jordan,
(France)	Emmanuel Fernandes	La France Insoumise	
(Greece)	Georgios Psychogios	Syriza	
(Germany)	Vinzenz Glaser	Die Linke	
(Italy)	Alessandra Maiorino	Five Star Movement	
(Turkey)	Berdan Öztürk	Peoples' Equality and Democracy Party	
(Turkey)	Ceylan Akça Cupolo	Peoples' Equality and Democracy Party	
(Germany)	Janina Böttger	Die Linke	
(France)	Sophia Chikirou	La France Insoumise	
(Italy)	Peppe De Cristofaro	Greens and Left Alliance	
(Republic of Ireland)	Ann Graves	Sinn Féin	
(Greece)	Dionysios-Charalampos Kalamatianos	Syriza	
(Italy)	Arnaldo Lomuti	Five Star Movement	
(France)	Silvana Silvani	Communist, Republican, Citizen and Ecologist group	
(Moldova)	Constantin Starîș	Party of Communists of the Republic of Moldova	
(Germany)	Aaron Valent	Die Linke	
(Norway)	Seher Aydar	Red Party	
(Turkey)	Semra Çağlar Gökalp	Peoples' Equality and Democracy Party	
(Spain)	Fabián Chinea	Gomera Socialist Group	
(Moldova)	Gabriela Cuneva	Alternative	
(France)	Michelle Gréaume	Communist, Republican, Citizen and Ecologist group	
(Greece)	Liana Kanelli	Communist Party of Greece	
(Italy)	Emma Pavanelli	Five Star Movement	
(Denmark)	Søren Søndergaard	Red–Green Alliance	Honouring of obligations and commitments by Albania
(Republic of Ireland)	Patricia Stephenson	Social Democrats	
(Germany)	Christin Willnat	Die Linke	
(Belgium)	Alice Bernard	Workers' Party of Belgium	
(France)	Gabrielle Cathala	La France Insoumise	
(Republic of Ireland)	Joanne Collins	Sinn Féin	
(Spain)	Esther Gil de Reboleño Lastortres	Sumar	
(Norway)	Marthe Hammer	Socialist Left Party	
(Italy)	Ettore Antonio Licheri	Five Star Movement	
(Belgium)	Julien Ribaudo	Workers' Party of Belgium	
(France)	Anne Stambach-Terrenoir	La France Insoumise	
(Slovenia)	Nataša Sukič	The Left	
(Denmark)	Eva Flyvholm	Red–Green Alliance	
(Denmark)	Sinem Dybvad Demir	Red–Green Alliance	
(Turkey)	Sevilay Çelenk Özen	Peoples' Equality and Democracy Party	

== Reports of former members ==
	Name	Party	Reports
(Netherlands)	Tuur Elzinga	Socialist Party	Activities of EBRD, Activities of OECD, Council of Europe Bank
(Germany)	Annette Groth	Die Linke	Rome migrants 2012, Trafficking migrant workers 2013, Syrian refugee crisis 2016
(Moldova)	Grigore Petrenco	Party of Communists of the Republic of Moldova	Albania 2014
(Denmark)	Nikolaj Vilmussen	Red-Green Alliance	Equality and the crisis 2015
(Greece)	Georgios Katrougalos	Syriza	The activities of the Organisation for Economic Co-operation and Development (OECD), Evaluation of the partnership for democracy in respect of the Parliament of Jordan, The impact of Brexit on human rights on the island of Ireland, European Convention on Human Rights and national constitutions, Globalisation in times of crisis and war: the role of the OECD since the Russian Federation's aggression against Ukraine, Observation of the early parliamentary elections in Armenia (20 June 2021)
(Iceland)	Ögmundur Jónasson	Left-Green Movement	Reinforcing social dialogue as an instrument for stability and decreasing social and economic inequalities, The honouring of obligations and commitments by the Republic of Moldova 2016
(Iceland)	Rósa Björk Brynjólfsdóttir	Left-Green Movement	Stop violence against, and exploitation of, migrant children, Effective guardianship for unaccompanied and separated migrant children
(Sweden)	Momodou Malcolm Jallow	Left Party (Sweden)	Combating Afrophobia, or anti Black racism in Europe, The role of political parties in fostering diversity and inclusion: a new Charter for a non-racist society, Raising awareness of and countering Islamophobia, or anti-Muslim racism, in Europe
(Spain)	Miren Gorrotxategi	Podemos Euskadi	Promoting sign language in Europe
(Denmark)	Ulla Sandbæk	The Alternative (Denmark)	Family reunification of refugees and migrants in the Council of Europe member States
(Moldova)	Adela Raileanu	Socialist Party of Moldova	
(Germany)	Andrej Hunko	Bündnis Sahra Wagenknecht	Over-indebteness of states 2011, Austerity measures 2012, Right to bargain collectively, right to strike 2015, Income inequality 2017, Lessons for the future from an effective and rights-based response to the COVID-19 pandemic, Overcoming the socio-economic crisis sparked by the Covid-19 pandemic, The honouring of membership obligations to the Council of Europe by San Marino
(Netherlands)	Tiny Kox	Socialist Party	Palestina 2011, Delegations PACE 2011, Observation Russian Federation 2012, Presidential election Russian Federation 2012, Palestina 2014, Europe's Public administrations 2014, Bosnia and Herzegovina 2014, Turkey 2015, International terrorism 2016, Acquis of the Council of Europe 2017, Bosnia and Herzegovina 2018
(Republic of Ireland)	Paul Gavan	Sinn Féin	Humanitarian consequences of the conflict between Armenia and Azerbaijan

== Honorary President of the Parliamentary Assembly ==
Presidency of the Parliamentary Assembly of the Council of Europe

	Name	Party	Reports
(Netherlands)	Tiny Kox	Socialist Party	Palestina 2011, Delegations PACE 2011, Observation Russian Federation 2012, Presidential election Russian Federation 2012, Palestina 2014, Europe's Public administrations 2014, Bosnia and Herzegovina 2014, Turkey 2015, International terrorism 2016, Acquis of the Council of Europe 2017Combating international terrorism while protecting Council of Europe standards and values, Bosnia and Herzegovina 2018, The Assembly's vision on the strategic priorities for the Council of Europe, Role and mission of the Parliamentary Assembly: main challenges for the future, Defending the acquis of the Council of Europe: preserving 65 years of successful intergovernmental co-operation, Guidelines on the scope of the parliamentary immunities enjoyed by members of the Parliamentary Assembly, Observation of the parliamentary elections in Georgia (31 October 2020)

== Honorary Associates of the Parliamentary Assembly ==
Name	Party	Reports
George Katrougalos	Syriza	
Hişyar Özsoy	Peoples' Democratic Party (Turkey)	
Nikolaj Villumsen	Red–Green Alliance (Denmark)	
Feleknas Uca	Peoples' Democratic Party (Turkey)	
Paul Gavan	Sinn Féin	Humanitarian consequences of the conflict between Armenia and Azerbaijan
Andrej Hunko	Sahra Wagenknecht Alliance	

== See also ==
- European United Left–Nordic Green Left
- European Anticapitalist Left
- Party of the European Left
