= Ferran Bel =

Spanish economist, academic and politician

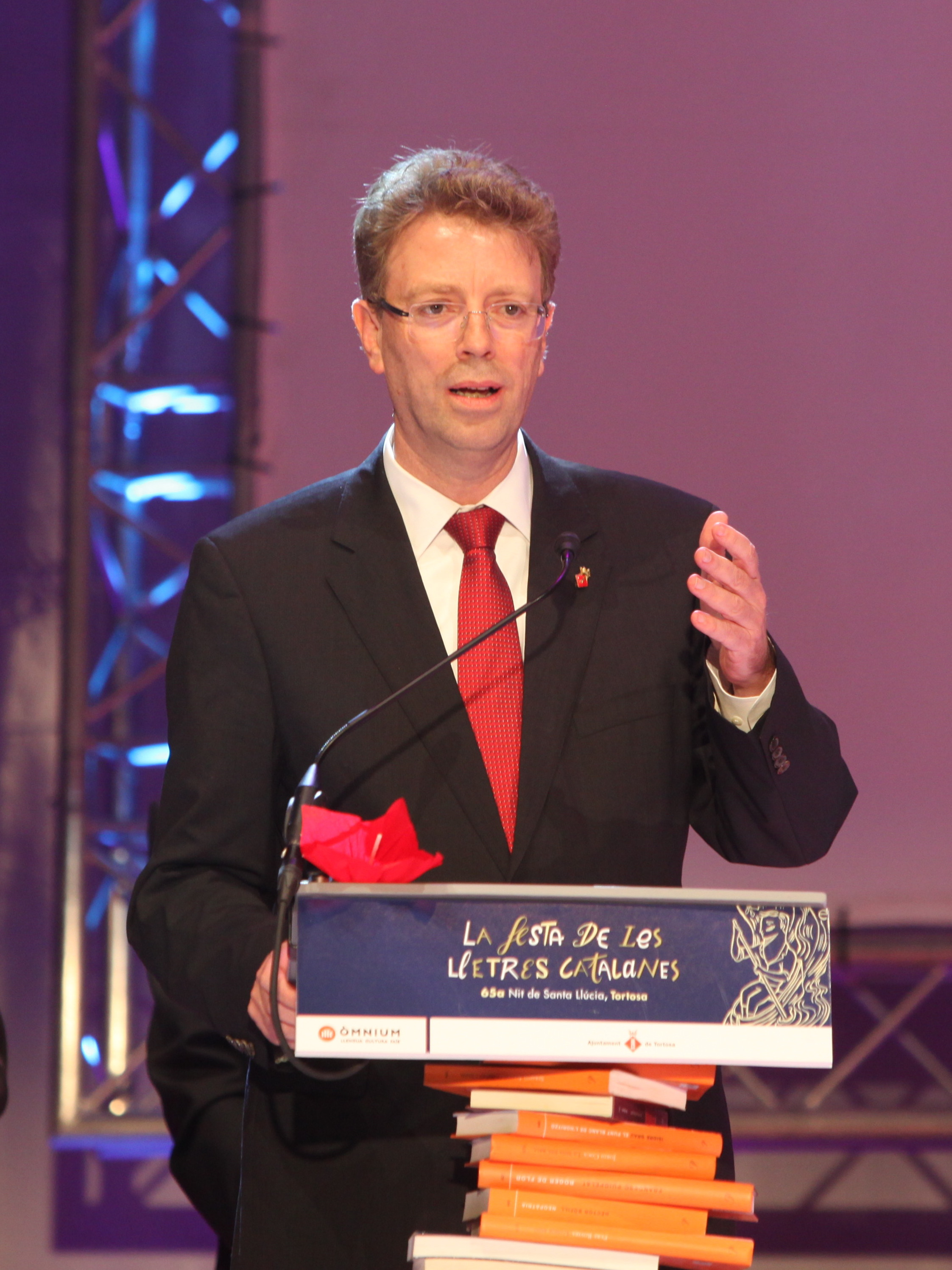
- Bel in December 2015

Member of the Congress of Deputies of Spain
- In office 8 January 2016 – 5 March 2019
- Constituency: Tarragona

Member of the Senate of Spain
- In office 20 November 2011 – 12 January 2016
- Constituency: Tarragona

Mayor of Tortosa
- In office 2007–2018
- Preceded by: Joan Sabaté i Borras
- Succeeded by: Meritxell Roigé i Pedrola

President of Baix Ebre County Council
- In office 2003–2007
- Preceded by: Joan Bertomeu i Bertomeu
- Succeeded by: Andreu Martí i Garcia

Member of Tortosa Municipal Council
- In office 2002–2018
- Preceded by: Marià Curto
- Succeeded by: Josep Cugat i Ginovart

Personal details
- Born: Ferran Bel i Accensi; 1 June 1965 (age 61) Tortosa, Catalonia, Spain
- Citizenship: Spanish
- Party: Catalan European Democratic Party
- Other political affiliations: Together for Catalonia
- Education: University of Barcelona
- Occupation: Economist, academic

Ferran Bel i Accensi (born 1 June 1965) is a Spanish economist, academic and politician from Catalonia. He is a former member of the Congress of Deputies of Spain and the Senate of Spain.

== Early life ==
Bel was born on 1 June 1965 in Tortosa, Catalonia. He was educated at San José school and Joaquim Bau Institute high school. He has a bachelor's degree in economic and business sciences and a postgraduate qualification in economics and management of local and autonomous finance from the University of Barcelona (UB). He was a research fellow at the Institut d'Estudis Autonòmics.

Bel joined the Democratic Convergence of Catalonia (CDC) in 1995 and was president of its local branch between 2000 and 2004 and regional president of Baix Ebre from 2004 to 2007. He was on the CDC's national council from 2004 and national executive committee from 2008.

== Career ==
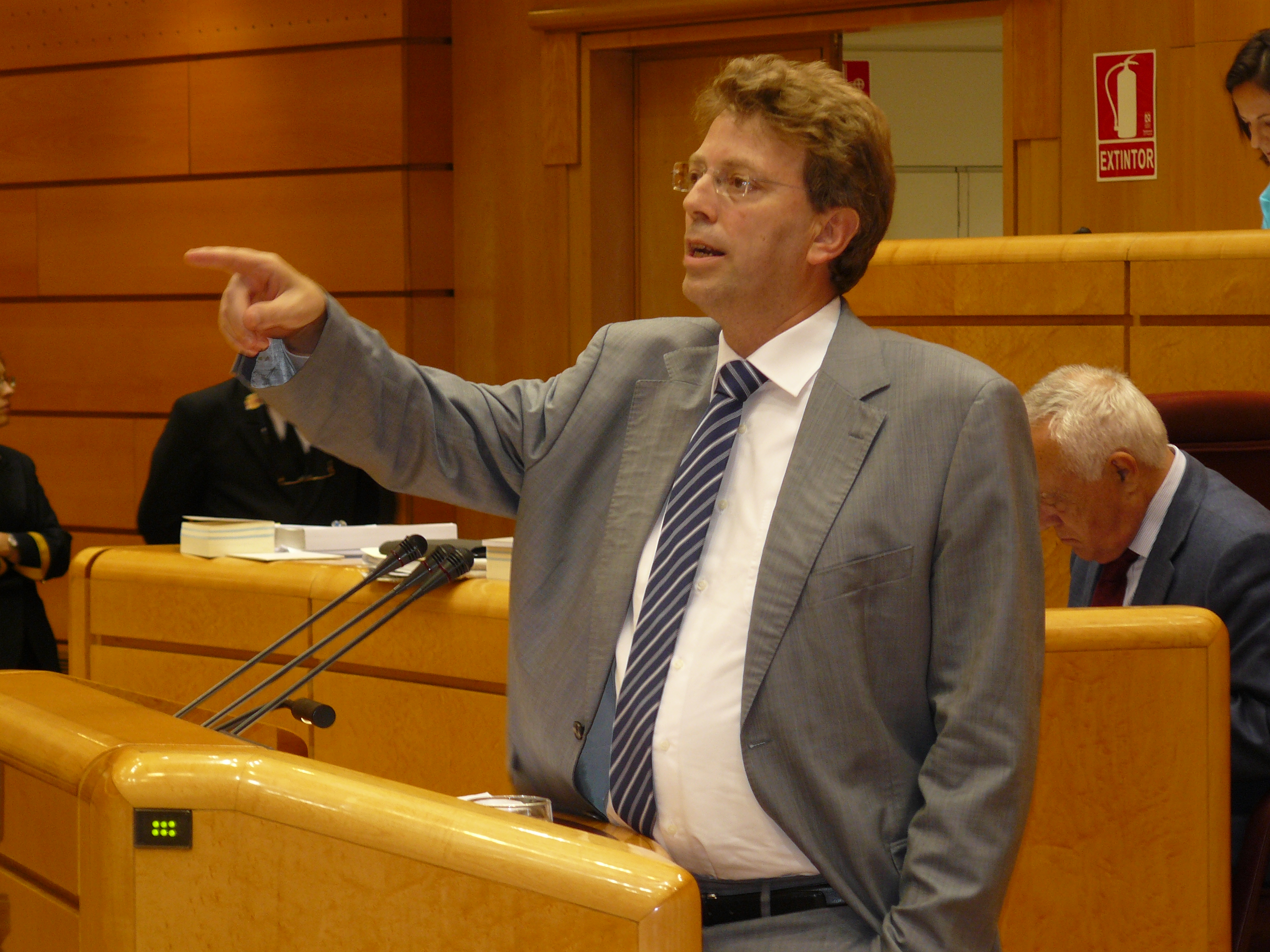
Bel addresses the Senate of Spain on 20 June 2012

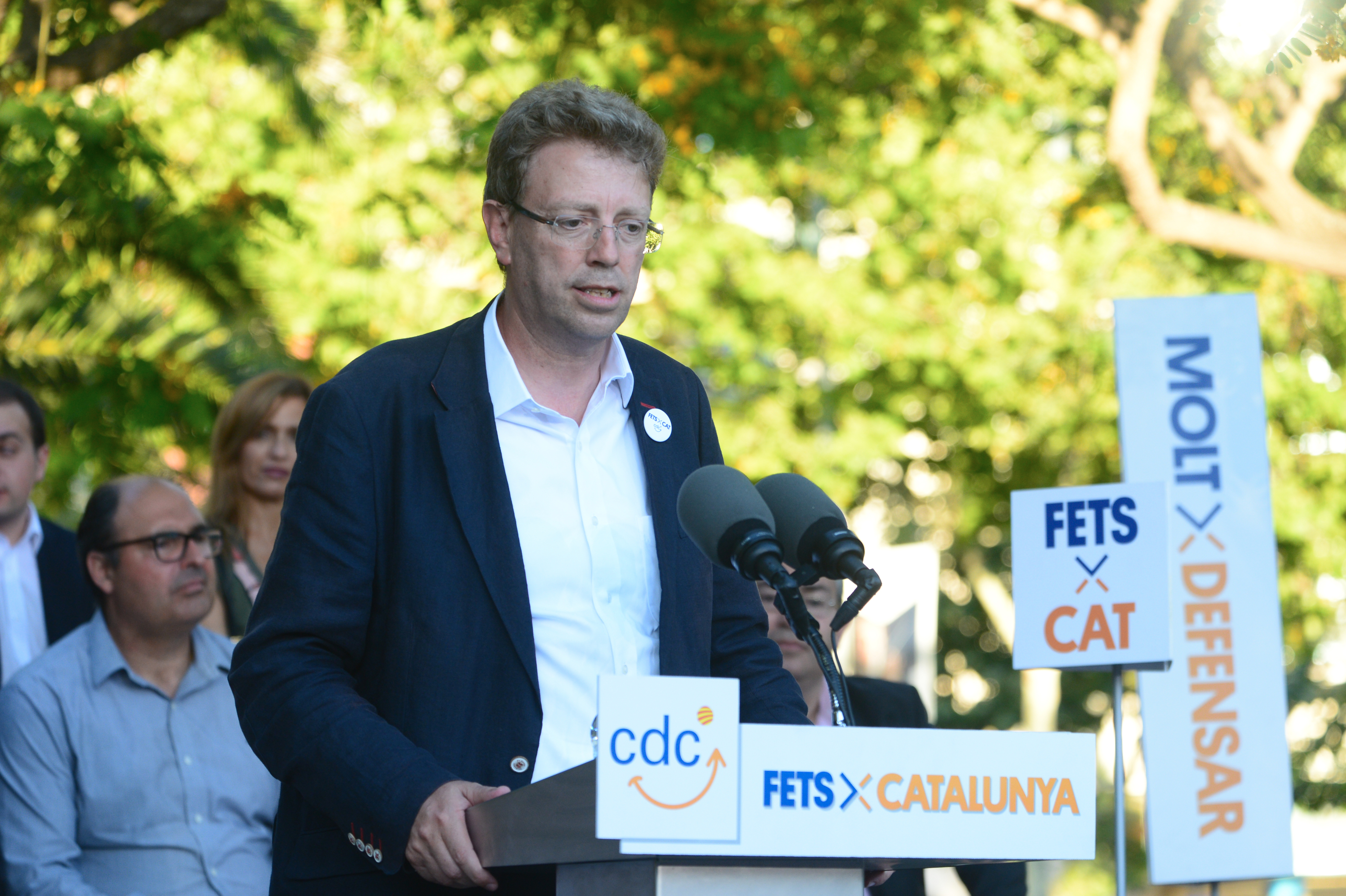
Bel addresses the CDC's "Acte a Cambrils" event on 21 June 2016

Bel worked as an economist at a professional firm of advisors he founded in 1991. He was associate professor of public finance and corporate taxation at UB's Department of Economic Policy and Public Finance between 1990 and 2005. He was an associate professor at the Rovira i Virgili University's (URV) Department of Private Procedural and Financial Law. He has been associate professor at URV's Department of Economics since 2012.

Bel entered Tortosa Municipal Council following the resignation of Marià Curto. He contested the 2003 local elections as a Convergence and Union (CiU) electoral alliance candidate in Tortosa and was re-elected. He was re-elected at the 2007, 2011 and 2015 local elections. He was president of Baix Ebre County Council from 2003 to 2007. He was mayor of Tortosa between 2007 and 2018.

Bel contested the 2011 general election as a CiU candidate in the Province of Tarragona and was elected to the Senate of Spain. He contested the 2015 general election as a Democracy and Freedom (DiL) electoral alliance candidate in the Province of Tarragona and was elected to the Congress of Deputies. He was re-elected at the 2016 general election. At the 2019 general election Bel was placed 2nd on the Together for Catalonia electoral alliance's list of candidates in the Province of Tarragona but the alliance only managed to win one seat in the province and as a result he failed to get re-elected to the Congress of Deputies.

Bel is a member of the Association of Economists of Catalonia (Col·legi d'Economistes de Catalunya), Registry of Economists and Tax Advisors (Registro de Economistas Asesores Fiscales, REAF), Registry of Forensic Economists (Registro de Economistas Forenses, REFOR) and Spanish Association of Accounting and Administration of Companies (Asociación Española de Contabilidad y Administración de Empresas, AECA).

== Personal life ==
Bel is married with two children, a son and a daughter.

== Electoral history ==
Electoral history of Ferran Bel
Election	Constituency	Party	Alliance	No.	Result
2003 local	Tortosa	Democratic Convergence of Catalonia	Convergence and Union	1	Elected
2007 local	Tortosa	Democratic Convergence of Catalonia	Convergence and Union	1	Elected
2011 local	Tortosa	Democratic Convergence of Catalonia	Convergence and Union	1	Elected
2011 general	Province of Tarragona	Democratic Convergence of Catalonia	Convergence and Union	1	Elected
2015 local	Tortosa	Democratic Convergence of Catalonia	Convergence and Union	1	Elected
2015 general	Province of Tarragona	Democratic Convergence of Catalonia	Democracy and Freedom	1	Elected
2016 general	Province of Tarragona	Democratic Convergence of Catalonia		1	Elected
2019 general	Province of Tarragona	Catalan European Democratic Party	Together for Catalonia	2	Not elected
