= Cupolo =

Cupolo is a surname. Notable people with the surname include:

- Bill Cupolo (1924–2005), Canadian ice hockey player
- Ceylan Akça Cupolo (born 1986), Turkish politician
