= Unna I =

Federal electoral district of Germany

143 Unna I
- Electoral district for the Bundestag
- Unna I in 2025
- State: North Rhine-Westphalia
- Population: 252,900 (2019)
- Electorate: 194,493 (2021)
- Major settlements: Unna; Bergkamen; Schwerte
- Area: 347.3 km^{2}

Current electoral district
- Created: 1965
- Party: SPD
- Member: Oliver Kaczmarek
- Elected: 2009, 2013, 2017, 2021, 2025

Unna I is an electoral constituency (German: Wahlkreis) represented in the Bundestag. It elects one member via first-past-the-post voting. Under the current constituency numbering system, it is designated as constituency 143. It is located in the Ruhr region of North Rhine-Westphalia, comprising the southern part of the district of Unna.

Unna I was created for the 1965 federal election. Since 2009, it has been represented by Oliver Kaczmarek of the Social Democratic Party (SPD).

== Geography ==
Unna I is located in the Ruhr region of North Rhine-Westphalia. As of the 2021 federal election, it comprises the municipalities of Bergkamen, Bönen, Fröndenberg, Holzwickede, Kamen, Schwerte, and Unna from the Unna district.

== History ==
Unna I was created in 1965, then known as Unna. It acquired its current name in the 1980 election. In the 1965 through 1976 elections, it was constituency 123 in the numbering system. From 1980 through 1998, it was number 116. From 2002 through 2009, it was number 145. In the 2013 through 2021 elections, it was number 144. From the 2025 election, it has been number 143.

Originally, the constituency was coterminous with the Unna district. It acquired its current borders in the 1980 election.

Election	No.	Name	Borders
1965	123	Unna	Unna district
1969	123	Unna	Unna district
1972	123	Unna	Unna district
1976	123	Unna	Unna district
1980	116	Unna I	Unna district (only Bergkamen, Bönen, Fröndenberg, Holzwickede, Kamen, Schwerte, and Unna municipalities)
1983	116	Unna I	Unna district (only Bergkamen, Bönen, Fröndenberg, Holzwickede, Kamen, Schwerte, and Unna municipalities)
1987	116	Unna I	Unna district (only Bergkamen, Bönen, Fröndenberg, Holzwickede, Kamen, Schwerte, and Unna municipalities)
1990	116	Unna I	Unna district (only Bergkamen, Bönen, Fröndenberg, Holzwickede, Kamen, Schwerte, and Unna municipalities)
1994	116	Unna I	Unna district (only Bergkamen, Bönen, Fröndenberg, Holzwickede, Kamen, Schwerte, and Unna municipalities)
1998	116	Unna I	Unna district (only Bergkamen, Bönen, Fröndenberg, Holzwickede, Kamen, Schwerte, and Unna municipalities)
2002	145	Unna I	Unna district (only Bergkamen, Bönen, Fröndenberg, Holzwickede, Kamen, Schwerte, and Unna municipalities)
2005	145	Unna I	Unna district (only Bergkamen, Bönen, Fröndenberg, Holzwickede, Kamen, Schwerte, and Unna municipalities)
2009	145	Unna I	Unna district (only Bergkamen, Bönen, Fröndenberg, Holzwickede, Kamen, Schwerte, and Unna municipalities)
2013	144	Unna I	Unna district (only Bergkamen, Bönen, Fröndenberg, Holzwickede, Kamen, Schwerte, and Unna municipalities)
2017	144	Unna I	Unna district (only Bergkamen, Bönen, Fröndenberg, Holzwickede, Kamen, Schwerte, and Unna municipalities)
2021	144	Unna I	Unna district (only Bergkamen, Bönen, Fröndenberg, Holzwickede, Kamen, Schwerte, and Unna municipalities)
2025	143	Unna I	Unna district (only Bergkamen, Bönen, Fröndenberg, Holzwickede, Kamen, Schwerte, and Unna municipalities)

== Members ==
The constituency has been held continuously by the Social Democratic Party (SPD) since its creation. It was first represented by Manfred Schulte from 1965 to 1987. Ulrich Böhme was representative from 1987 to 1998, followed by Rolf Stöckel until 2009. Oliver Kaczmarek was elected in 2009, and re-elected in 2013, 2017, 2021 and 2025.

Election	Member	Party	%
1965	Manfred Schulte	SPD	54.0
1969	Manfred Schulte	SPD	57.4
1972	Manfred Schulte	SPD	64.1
1976	Manfred Schulte	SPD	59.5
1980	Manfred Schulte	SPD	59.1
1983	Manfred Schulte	SPD	55.0
1987	Ulrich Böhme	SPD	55.4
1990	Ulrich Böhme	SPD	52.9
1994	Ulrich Böhme	SPD	55.5
1998	Rolf Stöckel	SPD	59.3
2002	Rolf Stöckel	SPD	56.4
2005	Rolf Stöckel	SPD	54.8
2009	Oliver Kaczmarek	SPD	42.6
2013	Oliver Kaczmarek	SPD	46.7
2017	Oliver Kaczmarek	SPD	38.8
2021	Oliver Kaczmarek	SPD	40.8
2025	Oliver Kaczmarek	SPD	31.8

== Election results ==
=== 2025 election ===
Federal election (2025): Unna I
Notes:	Blue background denotes the winner of the electorate vote. Pink background denotes a candidate elected from their party list. Yellow background denotes an electorate win by a list member, or other incumbent. A ✓ or ✗ denotes status of any incumbent, win or lose respectively.						
Party	Candidate	Votes	%	±%	Party votes	%	±%
SPD	✓ Oliver Kaczmarek	49,685	31.8	▼9.0	38,636	24.7	▼11.7
CDU	Tilman Rademacher	46,506	29.8	▲4.7	42,844	27.4	▲5.6
AfD	Friederike Hagelstein	29,075	18.6	▲10.6	29,411	18.8	▲11.0
Greens	Michael Sacher	14,058	9.0	▼4.9	16,275	10.4	▼3.2
Left	Oliver Schröder	9,491	6.1	▲2.9	11,269	7.2	▲3.7
BSW					6,254	4.0	
FDP	Benjamin Lehmkühler	3,973	2.5	▼3.7	5,436	3.5	▼6.9
Tierschutzpartei					2,489	1.6	▼0.2
Volt	Christina Emler	1,948	1.2		948	0.6	▲0.4
BD	Sebastian Rühling	535	0.4		534	0.4	▼0.2
PARTEI					923	0.6	▼0.6
FW				▼1.3	716	0.5	▼0.3
dieBasis				▼1.0	289	0.2	▼0.6
Team Todenhöfer					245	0.2	▼0.4
PdF					229	0.1	▲0.1
Values					73	0.0	
Pirates					534	0.4	▼0.2
MLPD				▼0.1	54	0.0	0.0
MERA25					45	0.0	
Gesundheitsforschung							▼0.1
Humanists							▼0.1
Bündnis C							▼0.1
ÖDP						0.0	0.0
SGP							0.0
Informal votes		1,412			976		
Total valid votes		156,059			156,495		
Turnout		157,471	82.7	▲6.5			
SPD hold	Majority	3,179	2.0	▼11.0			

=== 2021 election ===
Federal election (2021): Unna I
Notes:	Blue background denotes the winner of the electorate vote. Pink background denotes a candidate elected from their party list. Yellow background denotes an electorate win by a list member, or other incumbent. A ✓ or ✗ denotes status of any incumbent, win or lose respectively.						
Party	Candidate	Votes	%	±%	Party votes	%	±%
SPD	✓ Oliver Kaczmarek	59,869	40.8	▲2.0	53,490	36.4	▲2.8
CDU	Hubert Hüppe	36,810	25.1	▼6.7	31,995	21.8	▼5.4
Greens	Michael Sacher (Note: Sacher entered the Bundestag on the Greens list after the resignation of Oliver Krischer in June 2022.)	20,340	13.9	▲7.4	20,022	13.6	▲6.8
AfD	Ulrich Lehmann	11,736	8.0	▼1.1	11,428	7.8	▼2.0
FDP	Suat Gülden	9,137	6.2	▼0.2	15,286	10.4	▼1.1
Left	Andreas Meier	4,731	3.2	▼2.2	5,154	3.5	▼3.4
Tierschutzpartei					2,562	1.7	▲0.8
PARTEI					1,740	1.2	▲0.4
FW	Thomas Cieszynski	1,967	1.3	▲0.7	1,088	0.7	▲0.4
dieBasis	Artur Helios	1,451	1.0		1,151	0.8	
Team Todenhöfer					823	0.6	
Independent	Nadine Peiler	535	0.4				
Pirates					534	0.4	▼0.2
Volt					331	0.2	
LIEBE					211	0.1	
Gesundheitsforschung					193	0.1	0.0
LfK					175	0.1	
NPD					144	0.1	▼0.2
Humanists					107	0.1	0.0
V-Partei3					102	0.1	0.0
Bündnis C					89	0.1	
du.					76	0.1	
ÖDP					72	0.0	0.0
MLPD	Tobias Thylmann	185	0.1	0.0	64	0.0	0.0
PdF					45	0.0	
DKP					24	0.0	0.0
LKR					19	0.0	
SGP					11	0.0	0.0
Informal votes		1,322			1,147		
Total valid votes		146,761			146,936		
Turnout		148,083	76.1	▼0.1			
SPD hold	Majority	23,059	15.7	▲8.7			

=== 2017 election ===
Federal election (2017): Unna I
Notes:	Blue background denotes the winner of the electorate vote. Pink background denotes a candidate elected from their party list. Yellow background denotes an electorate win by a list member, or other incumbent. A ✓ or ✗ denotes status of any incumbent, win or lose respectively.						
Party	Candidate	Votes	%	±%	Party votes	%	±%
SPD	✓ Oliver Kaczmarek	58,019	38.8	▼7.8	50,205	33.6	▼7.4
CDU	Hubert Hüppe	47,452	31.8	▼4.1	40,697	27.2	▼4.7
AfD	Andreas Handt	13,558	9.1		14,689	9.8	▲6.1
FDP	Heike Schaumann	9,635	6.4	▲4.7	17,196	11.5	▲7.5
Greens	Michael Sacher	9,600	6.4	▲0.8	10,254	6.9	▼1.0
Left	Ruth Tietz	8,048	5.4	▲0.1	10,313	6.9	▲0.7
Tierschutzpartei					1,376	0.9	
PARTEI					1,146	0.8	▲0.4
Pirates	Marcel Stephan Clostermann	1,565	1.0	▼1.4	804	0.5	▼1.6
AD-DEMOKRATEN					717	0.5	
FW	Thomas Cieszynski	941	0.6	▼0.3	561	0.4	▼0.2
NPD					463	0.3	▼0.7
Independent	Jürgen Mollik	406	0.3				
Gesundheitsforschung					166	0.1	
Volksabstimmung					165	0.1	▼0.1
V-Partei³					148	0.1	
DM					143	0.1	
DiB					122	0.1	
ÖDP					115	0.1	0.0
BGE					97	0.1	
MLPD	Tobias Michael Karl Thylmann	161	0.1		88	0.1	0.0
Die Humanisten					76	0.1	
SGP					20	0.0	0.0
DKP					19	0.0	
Informal votes		1,446			1,251		
Total valid votes		149,385			149,580		
Turnout		150,831	76.2	▲2.2			
SPD hold	Majority	10,567	7.0	▼3.9			

=== 2013 election ===
Federal election (2013): Unna I
Notes:	Blue background denotes the winner of the electorate vote. Pink background denotes a candidate elected from their party list. Yellow background denotes an electorate win by a list member, or other incumbent. A ✓ or ✗ denotes status of any incumbent, win or lose respectively.						
Party	Candidate	Votes	%	±%	Party votes	%	±%
SPD	✓ Oliver Kaczmarek	68,287	46.7	▲4.1	60,019	40.9	▲3.3
CDU	Hubert Hüppe	52,433	35.8	▲3.4	46,794	31.9	▲5.7
Greens	Malte Spitz	8,242	5.6	▼3.0	11,567	7.9	▼1.4
Left	Walter Wendt-Kleinberg	7,749	5.3	▼3.2	9,127	6.2	▼3.2
AfD					5,525	3.8	
Pirates	Marcel Clostermann	3,535	2.4		3,189	2.2	▲0.5
FDP	Heike Schaumann	2,514	1.7	▼4.7	5,850	4.0	▼8.1
NPD		2,174	1.5	0.0	1,505	1.0	▼0.1
FW		1,342	0.9		882	0.6	
PARTEI					557	0.4	
PRO					362	0.2	
Volksabstimmung					309	0.2	▲0.1
BIG					172	0.1	
Nichtwahler					141	0.1	
REP					139	0.1	▼0.1
ÖDP					125	0.1	0.0
Party of Reason					114	0.1	
RRP					83	0.1	▼0.1
MLPD					55	0.0	0.0
BüSo					40	0.0	0.0
PSG					31	0.0	0.0
Die Rechte					29	0.0	
Informal votes		1,843			1,504		
Total valid votes		146,276			146,615		
Turnout		148,119	74.0	▲0.7			
SPD hold	Majority	15,854	10.9	▲0.7			

=== 2009 election ===
Federal election (2009): Unna I
Notes:	Blue background denotes the winner of the electorate vote. Pink background denotes a candidate elected from their party list. Yellow background denotes an electorate win by a list member, or other incumbent. A ✓ or ✗ denotes status of any incumbent, win or lose respectively.						
Party	Candidate	Votes	%	±%	Party votes	%	±%
SPD	Oliver Kaczmarek	62,638	42.6	▼12.2	55,439	37.6	▼12.7
CDU	Hubert Hüppe	47,702	32.4	▲0.8	38,646	26.2	▼0.4
Greens	Friedrich Ostendorff	12,737	8.7	▲3.7	13,756	9.3	▲2.2
Left	Walter Wendt-Kleinberg	12,451	8.5	▲4.1	13,842	9.4	▲4.0
FDP	Gero Heinrich Bangerter	9,418	6.4	▲3.3	17,773	12.1	▲4.3
Pirates					2,439	1.7	
NPD	Holger Steinbiß	2,206	1.5	▲0.3	1,665	1.1	▲0.2
Tierschutzpartei					1,045	0.7	▲0.2
RENTNER					958	0.7	
FAMILIE					727	0.5	▲0.1
REP					307	0.2	▼0.1
DVU					207	0.1	
RRP					183	0.1	
Volksabstimmung					144	0.1	0.0
ÖDP					88	0.1	
Centre					52	0.0	0.0
MLPD					44	0.0	0.0
BüSo					24	0.0	0.0
PSG					18	0.0	▼0.1
Informal votes		1,757			1,552		
Total valid votes		147,152			147,357		
Turnout		148,909	73.4	▼6.8			
SPD hold	Majority	14,936	10.2	▼13.0			

=== 2005 election ===
Federal election (2005): Unna I
Notes:	Blue background denotes the winner of the electorate vote. Pink background denotes a candidate elected from their party list. Yellow background denotes an electorate win by a list member, or other incumbent. A ✓ or ✗ denotes status of any incumbent, win or lose respectively.						
Party	Candidate	Votes	%	±%	Party votes	%	±%
SPD	✓ Rolf Stöckel	88,471	54.8	▼1.6	81,333	50.3	▼3.0
CDU	Hubert Hüppe	51,073	31.6	▲2.1	43,052	26.6	▼0.2
Greens	Friedrich Ostendorff	7,934	4.9	▼1.8	11,567	7.2	▼0.48
Left	Gabriele Dröst	7,076	4.4	▲3.3	8,786	5.4	▲4.3
FDP	Detlef Knop	4,957	3.1	▼2.5	12,580	7.8	▼0.5
NPD	Karl-Wilhelm Dickurt	1,940	1.2		1,542	1.0	▲0.6
Tierschutzpartei					798	0.5	▲0.1
Familie					638	0.4	▲0.2
REP					501	0.3	▼0.1
GRAUEN					472	0.3	▲0.1
From Now on... Democracy Through Referendum					181	0.1	
PBC					108	0.1	
MLPD					74	0.0	
Socialist Equality Party					59	0.0	
BüSo					42	0.0	
Centre					40	0.0	0.0
Informal votes		2,365			2,043		
Total valid votes		161,451			161,773		
Turnout		163,816	80.2	▼9.3			
SPD hold	Majority	37,398	23.2				
