= Michael Sacher =

German politician (born 1964)

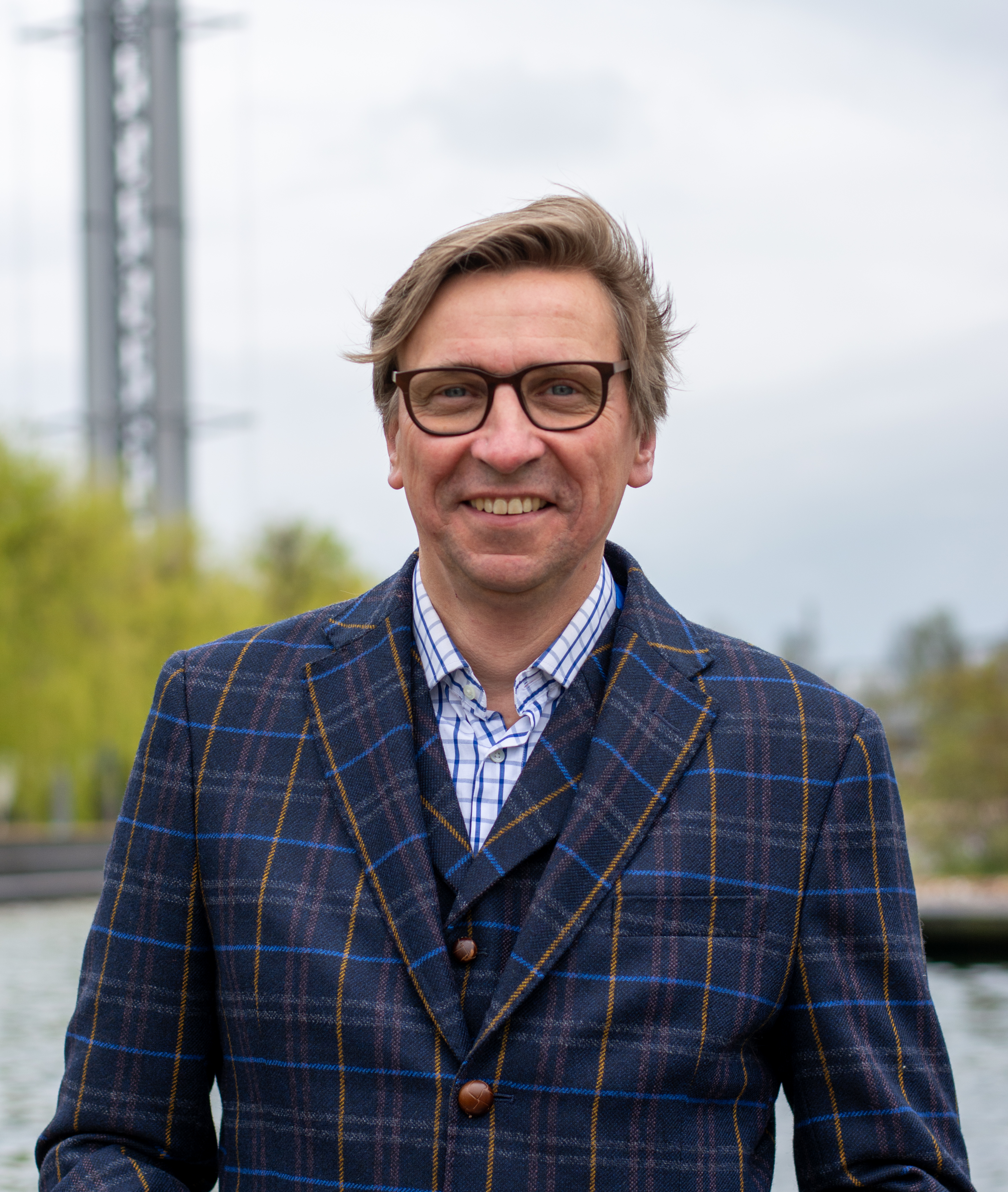
- Sacher in 2023

Member of the Bundestag; for Aachen I
- In office 30 June 2022 – 25 March 2025
- Preceded by: Oliver Krischer
- Succeeded by: Armin Laschet

Personal details
- Born: 1 September 1964 (age 62) Dortmund, West Germany
- Party: Alliance 90/The Greens
- Children: 1

Michael Sacher (born 1 September 1964) is a German politician from Alliance 90/The Greens.

== Early life ==
Sacher was born in Dortmund and worked as a bookseller before entering politics.

== Political career ==
In the 2021 German federal election, he contested Unna I but was not elected. In 2022, he entered the Bundestag, taking the seat of Oliver Krischer who resigned to join the Second Wüst cabinet.

== See also ==
- List of members of the 20th Bundestag
