= Andrej Hunko =

German politician

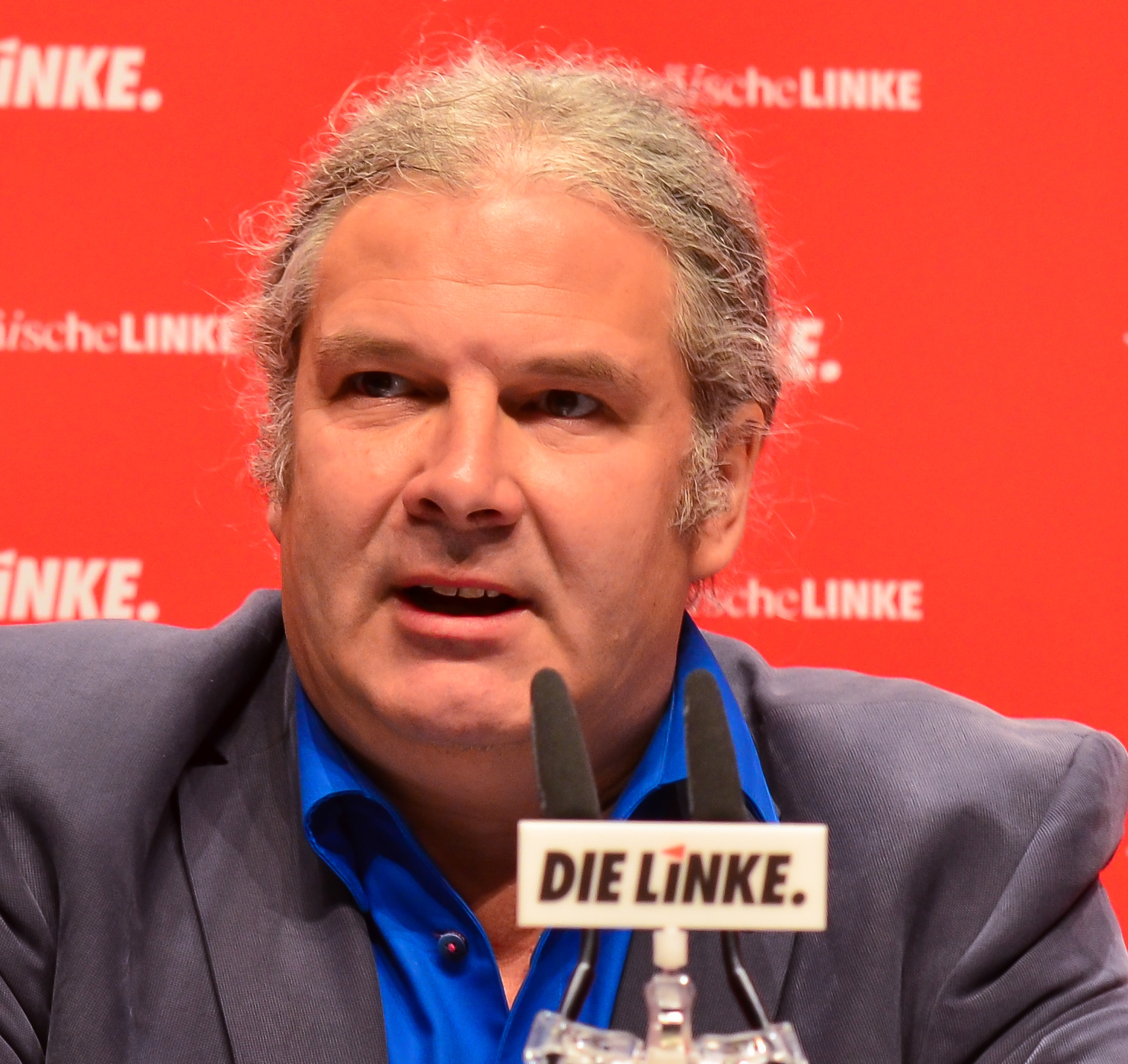
Andrej Hunko (2014)

Andrej Konstantin Hunko (born 29 September 1963) is a German politician. He has been a member of the German Bundestag from 2009 to 2025.

Hunko is a member of the Parliamentary Assembly of the Council of Europe (PACE) since 2010. He has been deputy chairman of the Unified European Left parliamentary group since 2015 and deputy chairman of the Left parliamentary group in the Bundestag since 2020.

Andrej Hunko left The Left and joined the new party Alliance Sahra Wagenknecht in 2023.

== Biography ==
Hunko was born in Munich and grew up in Aachen, where he graduated from the Kaiser-Karls-Gymnasium in 1983 and did his alternative civilian service with the Federation of Welfare Associations in Germany (Deutscher Paritätischer Wohlfahrtsverband). He is of Ukrainian descent. His grandfather fought for the Ukrainian National Army.

In 1985, he began studying medicine at the Albert-Ludwigs-University of Freiburg in southern Germany, which he terminated without graduating in 1991. In an interview in 2018, he said that this was "a reaction in 1991 to the Iraq war", "a not very mature reaction, as I find in retrospect". Afterwards, he held various jobs in Freiburg, Aachen, and Berlin, including truck driver, printer, nurse and journalist. From 1999 to 2004, he completed professional training as a media designer and worked as a media designer and printer. From 2007 to 2009 he was an employee of MEP Tobias Pflüger.

Since 2009, he has been a member of the German Bundestag for the party The Left. He was re-elected in 2013 and in 2017. His electoral constituency is Aachen.

Hunko ran as candidate for BSW North-Rhine Westplatina at 2025 German Federal election. The BSW received less than 5 percent and did not enter the Bundestag.

== Focus of political work ==
In his first years as a member of the Bundestag, one of Hunko's main areas of work was the crisis policy of the EU member states and the EU itself. In his opinion, austerity measures imposed on the member states in crisis threatened democracy and social rights and did not solve the crisis but rather exacerbated it. For the Parliamentary Assembly of the Council of Europe, he drafted a report on this subject entitled "Austerity measures – a danger for democracy and social rights". The accompanying resolution was adopted by a large majority. In the Bundestag, he repeatedly criticized German and European crisis policy.

A parliamentary inquiry by Hunko to the German government in 2016 revealed the importance of Ramstein Air Base for U.S. drone warfare. Hunko is also one of eight signatories of a complaint against the German government for "aiding and abetting the murder" of the Iranian General Qasem Soleimani, an airport employee and four other people. The orders for the attack are said to have gone through the U.S. base at Ramstein.

== Work as electoral observer ==
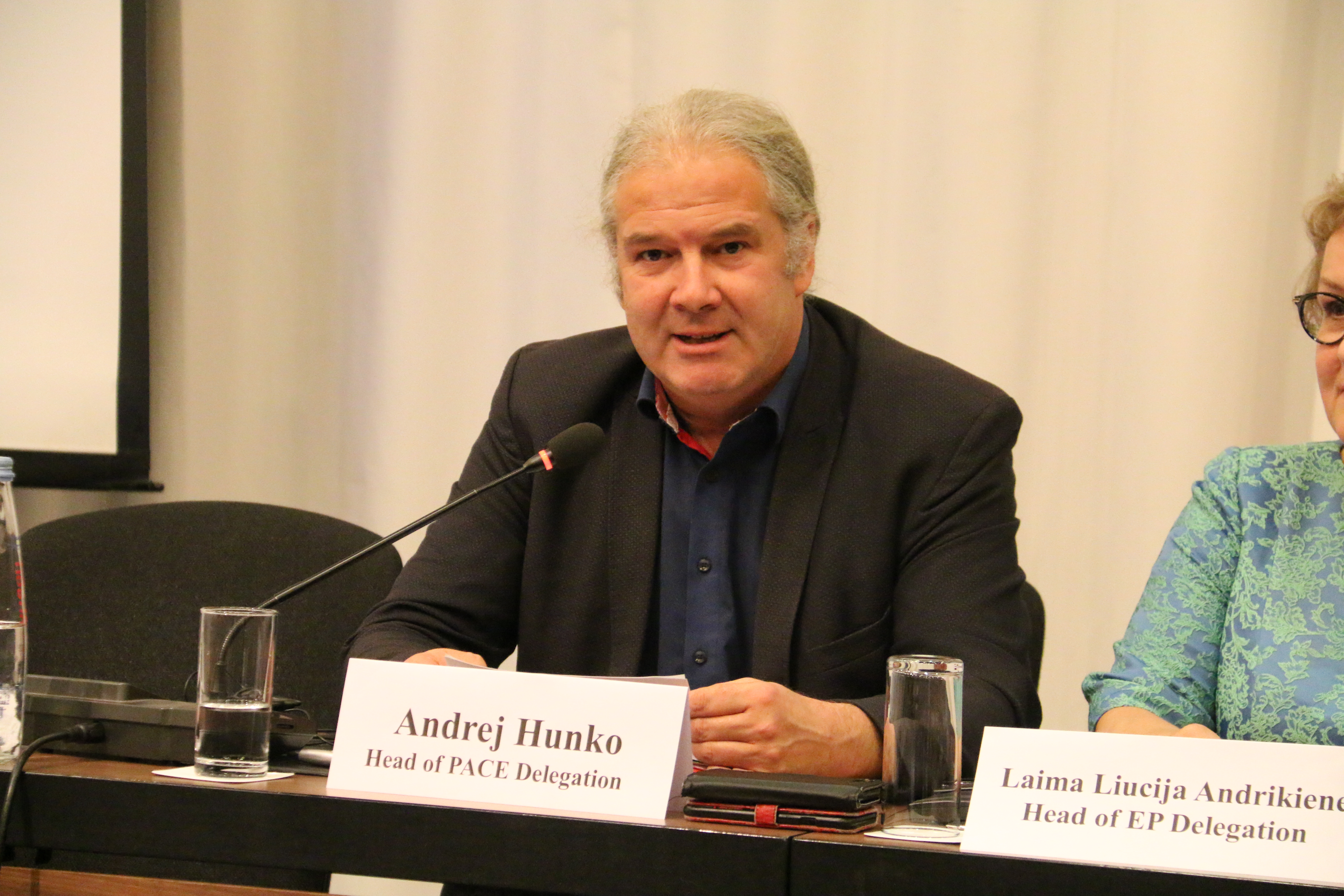
Andrej Hunko as head of the Election Observation Mission in Georgia (2018)

Hunko was a member of numerous Election Observation Missions (EOM) of the Parliamentary Assembly of the Council of Europe (PACE) and the OSCE. He observed the following elections, among others:

- 2010 Moldovan parliamentary election (PACE)
- 2011 Turkish general election (PACE)
- 2011 Kyrgyz presidential election (PACE)
- 2012 Kazakh legislative election (PACE)
- 2012 Ukrainian parliamentary election (PACE)
- 2014 Turkish presidential election (PACE)
- 2014 Ukrainian presidential election (PACE)
- 2014 Ukrainian parliamentary election (PACE)
- 2014 Macedonian general election (PACE)
- 2015 Belarusian presidential election (PACE)
- 2016 Georgian parliamentary election (PACE)
- 2017 Turkish constitutional referendum (PACE)
- 2018 Russian presidential election (OSCE)
- 2018 Georgian presidential election (PACE, Head of Delegation)
- 2020 United States presidential election (OSCE)

Hunko cancelled his participation in the Council of Europe's election observation delegation for the local elections in Ukraine in 2015 at short notice.

In April 2017, Hunko was part of the official PACE mission to observe the controversial Turkish constitutional referendum that criticized the referendum as an "unlevel playing field". As a reaction to critical reports Hunko and his PACE colleague Stefan Schennach from Austria made about the election process in east Turkey, he was accused by the Turkish president Recep Tayyip Erdoğan and his Minister of Foreign Affairs Mevlüt Çavuşoğlu to be a supporter of the PKK, which is classified as a terrorist organization by the US, NATO, and Turkey but not the UN or PACE. In a statement, Hunko rejected those accusations as a "campaign to delegitimise" his person, arguing "they wish to present my statements on the disputed vote as unreliable and distract attention from the fact that the referendum on 16 April was held under undemocratic and unfair conditions, with electoral fraud possibly even responsible for the close result".

He was also scheduled as an OSCE election observer for the parliamentary and presidential elections in Turkey in 2018. However, Turkey denied him entry.
