= Franz Josef Bach =

German politician

Member of the Bundestag; for Aachen-Stadt
- In office 20 October 1969 – 13 December 1972
- Preceded by: Edmund Sinn
- Succeeded by: Dieter Schinzel

Personal details
- Born: 4 February 1917 Neuss, Germany
- Died: 3 August 2001 (aged 84) Aachen, Germany
- Party: Christian Democratic Union
- Education: RWTH Aachen University; University of Virginia

Franz Josef Bach (4 February 1917 – 3 August 2001) was a German politician of the Christian Democratic Union (CDU) and former member of the German Bundestag.

== Political career ==
Bach, who was a member of the CDU, was a member of the German Bundestag from 1969 to 1972. He represented the constituency of Aachen-Stadt in parliament.

== Literature ==
Herbst, Ludolf; Jahn, Bruno (2002). Vierhaus, Rudolf (ed.). Biographisches Handbuch der Mitglieder des Deutschen Bundestages. 1949–2002 [Biographical Handbook of the Members of the German Bundestag. 1949–2002] (in German). München: De Gruyter - De Gruyter Saur. p. 1715. ISBN 978-3-11-184511-1.
