= Aachen I =

Electoral constituency in Germany

Coordinates: 50°46′N 5°57′E

86 Aachen I
- Electoral district for the Bundestag
- Aachen I in 2025
- State: North Rhine-Westphalia
- Population: 249,000 (2019)
- Electorate: 176,306 (2021)
- Major settlements: Aachen
- Area: 160.9 km^{2}

Current electoral district
- Created: 1949
- Party: CDU
- Member: Armin Laschet
- Elected: 2025

Aachen I is an electoral constituency (German: Wahlkreis) represented in the Bundestag. It elects one member via first-past-the-post voting. Under the current constituency numbering system, it is designated as constituency 86. It is located in western North Rhine-Westphalia, comprising the city of Aachen.

Aachen I was created for the inaugural 1949 federal election. From 2021-2025, it has been represented by Oliver Krischer of the Alliance 90/The Greens. Since 2025 it has been represent by Armin Laschet of Christian Democratic Union of Germany.

== Geography ==
Aachen I is located in western North Rhine-Westphalia. As of the 2021 federal election, it comprises the city of Aachen from the Städteregion Aachen.

== History ==
Aachen I was created in 1949, then known as Aachen-Stadt. From 1980 through 2009, it was named Aachen. It acquired its current name in the 2013 election. In the 1949 election, it was North Rhine-Westphalia constituency 1 in the numbering system. In the 1949 through 1961 elections, it was number 60. From 1965 through 1998, it was number 53. From 2002 through 2009, it was number 88. In the 2013 through 2021 elections, it was number 87. From the 2025 election, it has been number 86. While its borders have not changed since its creation, the former independent city of Aachen was incorporated into the Städteregion Aachen in 2009.

Election	No.	Name	Borders
1949	1	Aachen-Stadt	Aachen city
1953	60	Aachen-Stadt	Aachen city
1957	60	Aachen-Stadt	Aachen city
1961	60	Aachen-Stadt	Aachen city
1965	53	Aachen-Stadt	Aachen city
1969	53	Aachen-Stadt	Aachen city
1972	53	Aachen-Stadt	Aachen city
1976	53	Aachen-Stadt	Aachen city
1980	53	Aachen	Aachen city
1983	53	Aachen	Aachen city
1987	53	Aachen	Aachen city
1990	53	Aachen	Aachen city
1994	53	Aachen	Aachen city
1998	53	Aachen	Aachen city
2002	88	Aachen	Aachen city
2005	88	Aachen	Aachen city
2009	88	Aachen	Aachen city
2013	87	Aachen I	Städteregion Aachen (only Aachen municipality)
2017	87	Aachen I	Städteregion Aachen (only Aachen municipality)
2021	87	Aachen I	Städteregion Aachen (only Aachen municipality)
2025	86	Aachen I	Städteregion Aachen (only Aachen municipality)

== Members ==
The constituency was first represented by Helene Weber of the Christian Democratic Union (CDU) from 1949 to 1957, followed by fellow CDU member Franz Meyers until 1961 and Edmund Sinn from 1961 to 1969. Former Minister-President of North Rhine-Westphalia Franz Josef Bach of the CDU served a single term from 1969 to 1972, when the constituency was won by the Social Democratic Party (SPD) candidate Dieter Schinzel. The CDU regained it in 1976 with candidate Hans Stercken, who served until 1994. Future Minister-President of North Rhine-Westphalia and federal CDU leader Armin Laschet then served from 1994 to 1998. Ulla Schmidt of the SPD was elected in 1998 and served three terms. She served as Federal Minister of Health from 2001 to 2009. Rudolf Henke won the constituency for the CDU in 2009, and was re-elected in 2013 and 2017. Oliver Krischer of the Greens was elected in 2021. Armin Laschet of the CDU was elected in 2025.

Election	Member	Party	%
1949	Helene Weber	CDU	53.2
1953	Helene Weber	CDU	57.7
1957	Franz Meyers	CDU	62.6
1961	Edmund Sinn	CDU	54.9
1965	Edmund Sinn	CDU	53.8
1969	Franz Josef Bach	CDU	49.6
1972	Dieter Schinzel	SPD	47.3
1976	Hans Stercken	CDU	48.2
1980	Hans Stercken	CDU	45.9
1983	Hans Stercken	CDU	50.2
1987	Hans Stercken	CDU	46.5
1990	Hans Stercken	CDU	45.0
1994	Armin Laschet	CDU	46.2
1998	Ulla Schmidt	SPD	47.3
2002	Ulla Schmidt	SPD	47.4
2005	Ulla Schmidt	SPD	40.5
2009	Rudolf Henke	CDU	39.4
2013	Rudolf Henke	CDU	40.7
2017	Rudolf Henke	CDU	33.7
2021	Oliver Krischer	GRÜNE	30.2
2025	Armin Laschet	CDU	32.3

== Election results ==
=== 2025 election ===
Federal election (2025): Aachen I
Notes:	Blue background denotes the winner of the electorate vote. Pink background denotes a candidate elected from their party list. Yellow background denotes an electorate win by a list member, or other incumbent. A ✓ or ✗ denotes status of any incumbent, win or lose respectively.						
Party	Candidate	Votes	%	±%	Party votes	%	±%
CDU	Armin Laschet	45,545	32.3	▲6.7	34,180	23.9	▲1.1
Greens	Lukas Benner	39,377	27.9	▼2.3	34,769	24.3	▼4.7
SPD	Ye-One Rhie	27,720	19.7	▼4.2	25,205	17.6	▼4.3
AfD	Roger Lebien			▼3.8	13,891	9.7	▲5.8
Left	Fabian Fahl	13,162	9.3	▲4.9	18,398	12.9	▲7.5
FDP	Katharina Willkomm	5,916	4.2	▼3.7	6,870	4.8	▼6.0
BSW					5,011	3.5	
FW	Nadine Berndt	3,338	2.4	▲1.8	403	0.3	▼0.1
Volt	Alexandra Radermacher	3,211	2.3		1,522	1.1	▲0.1
BD	Heinz Brenkfeld	2,678	1.9		231	0.2	
Tierschutzpartei					970	0.7	▼0.1
PARTEI				▼2.2	743	0.5	▼0.7
PdF					241	0.2	▲0.1
Team Todenhöfer					195	0.1	▼0.5
dieBasis				▼1.1	187	0.1	▼0.8
MLPD					36	0.0	0.0
MERA25					93	0.1	
Values					39	0.0	
Pirates							▼0.4
Humanists							▼0.2
ÖDP							▼0.2
Gesundheitsforschung							▼0.1
Bündnis C							0.0
Informal votes		2,092			865		
Total valid votes		140,947			142,984		
Turnout		143,849	83.4	▲4.0			
CDU gain from Greens	Majority	6,168	4.4				

=== 2021 election ===
Federal election (2021): Aachen I
Notes:	Blue background denotes the winner of the electorate vote. Pink background denotes a candidate elected from their party list. Yellow background denotes an electorate win by a list member, or other incumbent. A ✓ or ✗ denotes status of any incumbent, win or lose respectively.						
Party	Candidate	Votes	%	±%	Party votes	%	±%
Greens	Oliver Krischer	41,942	30.2	▲20.8	40,421	29.0	▲16.2
CDU	✗ Rudolf Henke	35,562	25.6	▼8.1	31,772	22.8	▼5.0
SPD	Ye-One Rhie	33,087	23.8	▼8.7	30,588	22.0	▼2.8
FDP	Katharina Willkomm	10,906	7.9	▲0.5	15,032	10.8	▼3.4
Left	Andrej Hunko	6,161	4.4	▼4.4	7,453	5.4	▼5.0
AfD	Roger Lebien	5,314	3.8	▼1.8	5,427	3.9	▼2.0
PARTEI	Elke Zobel	3,058	2.2		1,632	1.2	0.0
Volt					1,389	1.0	
dieBasis	Stephan Korupp	1,502	1.1		1,342	1.0	
Tierschutzpartei					1,151	0.8	▲0.3
Team Todenhöfer					871	0.6	
Pirates					542	0.4	▼0.2
FW	Hans-Jürgen Fink	849	0.6		531	0.4	▲0.2
Independent	Niklas Teßmann	410	0.3				
Humanists					268	0.2	▲0.1
ÖDP					224	0.2	▼0.3
Independent	Adonis Böving	122	0.1				
V-Partei3					104	0.1	▼0.1
LIEBE					88	0.1	
Gesundheitsforschung					72	0.1	0.0
du.					70	0.1	
LfK					67	0.0	
Bündnis C					53	0.0	
NPD					44	0.0	▼0.1
DKP					42	0.0	0.0
PdF					33	0.0	
MLPD					30	0.0	0.0
LKR					25	0.0	
SGP					22	0.0	0.0
Informal votes		1,107			727		
Total valid votes		138,913			139,293		
Turnout		140,020	79.4	▲1.0			
Greens gain from CDU	Majority	6,380	4.6				

=== 2017 election ===
Federal election (2017): Aachen I
Notes:	Blue background denotes the winner of the electorate vote. Pink background denotes a candidate elected from their party list. Yellow background denotes an electorate win by a list member, or other incumbent. A ✓ or ✗ denotes status of any incumbent, win or lose respectively.						
Party	Candidate	Votes	%	±%	Party votes	%	±%
CDU	✓ Rudolf Henke	47,011	33.7	▼7.0	38,827	27.8	▼8.8
SPD	Ulla Schmidt	45,309	32.5	▼2.8	34,663	24.8	▼2.5
Greens	Katrin Feldmann	13,104	9.4	▲0.4	17,918	12.8	▼0.3
Left	Andrej Hunko	12,282	8.8	▲2.6	14,459	10.3	▲2.7
FDP	Cliff Gatzweiler	10,232	7.3	▲5.2	19,795	14.2	▲7.9
AfD	Markus Mohr	7,817	5.6	▲3.4	8,271	5.9	▲2.8
Pirates	Matthias Achilles	2,176	1.6	▼1.9	838	0.6	▼2.9
PARTEI					2,595	1.1	▲0.6
Tierschutzpartei					697	0.5	
ÖDP	Nico Riedemann	1,426	1.0		608	0.4	▲0.3
AD-DEMOKRATEN					435	0.3	
DiB					382	0.3	
FW					251	0.2	▼0.2
Die Humanisten					191	0.1	
BGE					182	0.1	
V-Partei³					177	0.1	
NPD					149	0.1	▼0.4
DM					131	0.1	
Volksabstimmung					67	0.0	▼0.1
Gesundheitsforschung					64	0.0	
MLPD					55	0.0	0.0
DKP					28	0.0	
SGP					18	0.0	0.0
Informal votes		1,267			823		
Total valid votes		139,357			139,801		
Turnout		140,624	78.4	▲3.7			
CDU hold	Majority	1,702	1.2	▼4.2			

=== 2013 election ===
Federal election (2013): Aachen I
Notes:	Blue background denotes the winner of the electorate vote. Pink background denotes a candidate elected from their party list. Yellow background denotes an electorate win by a list member, or other incumbent. A ✓ or ✗ denotes status of any incumbent, win or lose respectively.						
Party	Candidate	Votes	%	±%	Party votes	%	±%
CDU	✓ Rudolf Henke	54,175	40.7	▲1.3	48,728	36.6	▲4.7
SPD	Ulla Schmidt	46,907	35.3	▲5.3	36,432	27.3	▲4.9
Greens	Andreas Mittelstädt	11,931	9.0	▼4.4	17,485	13.1	▼3.0
Left	Andrej Hunko	8,225	6.2	▼1.2	10,212	7.7	▼0.8
Pirates	Marc Salgert	4,541	3.4		4,669	3.5	▼0.2
AfD	Uwe Bahmann	2,961	2.2		4,149	3.1	
FDP	Birgit Haveneth	2,883	2.2	▼6.8	8,401	6.3	▼8.8
PARTEI					784	0.6	
NPD	Felix van der Lee	743	0.6	▼0.3	680	0.5	▼0.1
FW	Heinrich Pesch	605	0.5		555	0.4	
ÖDP					221	0.2	▲0.1
PRO					160	0.1	
Nichtwahler					149	0.1	
Volksabstimmung					137	0.1	
BIG					123	0.1	
REP					116	0.1	▼0.1
Party of Reason					91	0.1	
Die Rechte					46	0.0	
RRP					40	0.0	▼0.1
MLPD					25	0.0	0.0
BüSo					17	0.0	0.0
PSG					14	0.0	0.0
Informal votes		1,476			1,213		
Total valid votes		132,971			133,234		
Turnout		134,447	74.7	▲1.1			
CDU hold	Majority	7,268	5.4	▼4.1			

=== 2009 election ===
Federal election (2009): Aachen
Notes:	Blue background denotes the winner of the electorate vote. Pink background denotes a candidate elected from their party list. Yellow background denotes an electorate win by a list member, or other incumbent. A ✓ or ✗ denotes status of any incumbent, win or lose respectively.						
Party	Candidate	Votes	%	±%	Party votes	%	±%
CDU	Rudolf Henke	50,703	39.4	▲0.3	41,146	31.9	▼0.9
SPD	✗ Ulla Schmidt	38,523	29.9	▼10.6	28,937	22.4	▼10.8
Greens	Jochen Luczak	17,241	13.4	▲4.2	20,765	16.1	▲1.7
FDP	Petra Müller	11,554	9.0	▲3.5	19,464	15.1	▲3.6
Left	Andrej Hunko	9,520	7.4	▲2.5	10,911	8.5	▲2.5
Pirates					4,837	3.7	
NPD	Oliver Harf	1,088	0.8	▲0.1	789	0.6	0.0
Tierschutzpartei					672	0.5	▲0.1
FAMILIE					385	0.3	0.0
RENTNER					314	0.2	
REP					221	0.2	0.0
ÖDP					149	0.1	
RRP					149	0.1	
Volksabstimmung					87	0.1	0.0
Centre					62	0.0	
DVU					54	0.0	
MLPD					34	0.0	0.0
BüSo					32	0.0	▼0.0
PSG					9	0.0	0.0
Informal votes		1,582			1,194		
Total valid votes		128,629			129,017		
Turnout		130,211	73.6	▼5.2			
CDU gain from SPD	Majority	12,180	9.5				

=== 2005 election ===
Federal election (2005): Aachen I
Notes:	Blue background denotes the winner of the electorate vote. Pink background denotes a candidate elected from their party list. Yellow background denotes an electorate win by a list member, or other incumbent. A ✓ or ✗ denotes status of any incumbent, win or lose respectively.						
Party	Candidate	Votes	%	±%	Party votes	%	±%
SPD	✓ Ulla Schmidt	55,086	40.50	▼6.80	45,300	33.30	▼2.80
CDU	Marcel Phillipp	53,170	39.1	▲1.2	44,710	32.8	▼1.2
Greens	Thomas Griese	12,462	9.2	▲2.1	19,566	14.4	▼2.3
FDP	Petra Müller	7,476	5.5	▲0.3	15,655	11.5	▲1.8
Left	Andreas Müller	6,655	4.9	▲3.7	8,165	6.0	▲4.4
NPD	Oliver Harf	1,034	0.8		880	0.6	▲0.5
Tierschutzpartei					541	0.4	▲0.1
GRAUEN					481	0.4	▲0.2
Familie					369	0.3	▲0.1
REP					218	0.2	
From now on...Democracy through referendum					93	0.1	
PBC					71	0.1	
Socialist Equality Party					48	0.0	
Centre					41	0.	
MLPD					41	0.0	0.0
Informal votes		1,996			1,656		
Total valid votes		135,883			136,223		
Turnout		137,879	78.8	▼1.7			
SPD hold	Majority	1,916	1.4				
