= Manel de la Vega =

Spanish politician (born 1973)

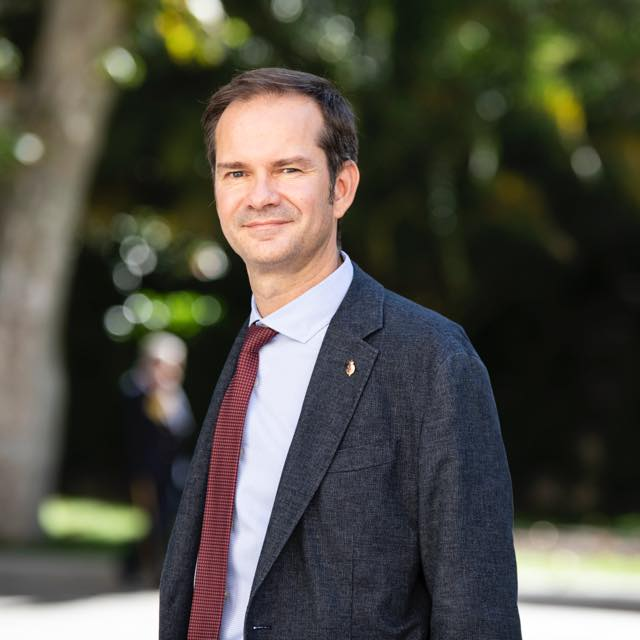
- de la Vega in 2021

Member of the Senate
- Incumbent
- Assumed office 23 July 2023
- Constituency: Tarragona
- In office 27 November 2019 – 15 September 2021
- Appointed by: Parliament of Catalonia

Personal details
- Born: 6 September 1971 (age 54)
- Party: Socialists' Party of Catalonia

Manel de la Vega Carrera (born 6 September 1971) is a Spanish politician. He has been a member of the Senate since 2023, having previously served from 2019 to 2021. He has served as first secretary of the Socialists' Party of Catalonia in Terres de l'Ebre since 2017.
