= Laura Castel =

Spanish politician (born 1970)

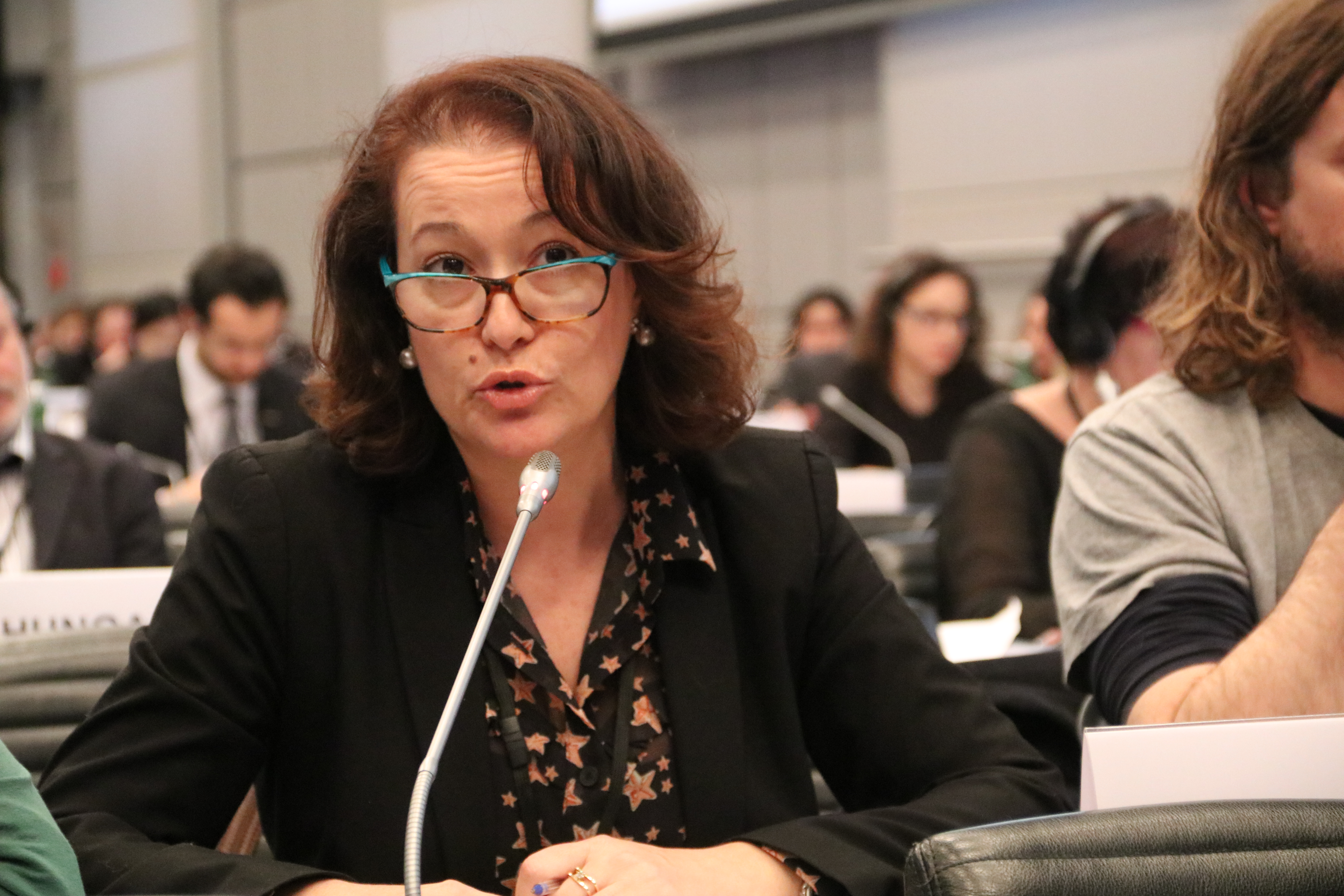
- Castel in 2017

Member of the Senate
- Incumbent
- Assumed office 26 July 2024
- Appointed by: Parliament of Catalonia
- In office 26 June 2016 – 16 August 2023
- Constituency: Tarragona

Personal details
- Born: 8 May 1970 (age 55)
- Party: Republican Left of Catalonia

Laura Castel i Fort (born 8 May 1970) is a Spanish politician. She has been a member of the Senate since 2024, having previously served from 2016 to 2023. She has been a member of the Parliamentary Assembly of the Council of Europe since 2020, and has served as co-chair of the Unified European Left Group since 2025.
