= Ulla Schmidt =

German politician (born 1949)

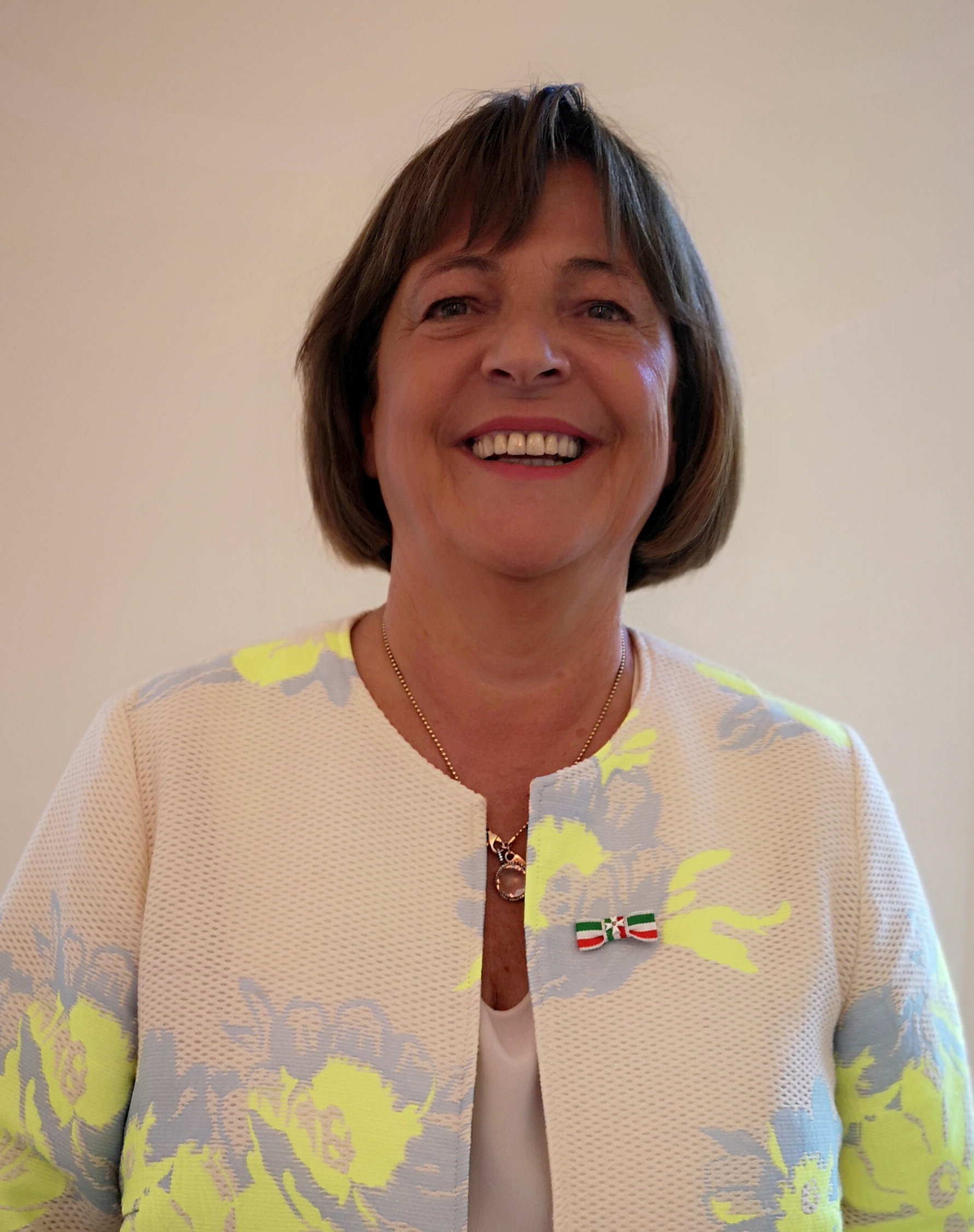
- Schmidt in 2018

Vice President of the Bundestag (on proposal of the SPD-faction)
- In office 22 October 2013 – 24 October 2017 Serving with Edelgard Bulmahn
- President: Norbert Lammert
- Preceded by: Susanne Kastner (2009) (Note: The SPD-faction had no entitlement to a second vice president between 2009 and 2013.)
- Succeeded by: None (Note: The SPD-faction was not allowed to propose a second VP after the 2017 election.)

Minister of Health
- In office 22 November 2005 – 27 October 2009
- Chancellor: Angela Merkel
- Preceded by: Herself (Health and Social Security)
- Succeeded by: Philipp Rösler
- In office 12 January 2001 – 22 October 2002
- Chancellor: Gerhard Schröder
- Preceded by: Andrea Fischer
- Succeeded by: Herself (Health and Social Security)

Minister of Health and Social Security
- In office 22 October 2002 – 22 November 2005
- Chancellor: Gerhard Schröder
- Preceded by: Walter Riester (Social Affairs); Herself (Health)
- Succeeded by: Franz Müntefering (Social Affairs); Herself (Health)

Member of the Bundestag; from North Rhine-Westphalia
- In office 20 December 1990 – 26 October 2021
- Constituency: State list (1990–1998); Aachen (1998–2009); State list (2009–2021)

Personal details
- Born: Ursula Radermacher; 13 June 1949 (age 77) Aachen, West Germany
- Party: Social Democratic
- Children: 1
- Education: RWTH Aachen; University of Hagen
- Profession: Teacher for Primary and General Schools
- Website: ulla-schmidt.de

Ursula "Ulla" Schmidt (née Radermacher; born 13 June 1949) is a German politician of the Social Democratic Party of Germany (SPD). From 2001 to 2009 she was Federal Minister of Health in the German Government. Between 2013 and 2017, she served as Vice-President of the German Bundestag.

== Early life and education ==
Schmidt studied at RWTH Aachen and the University of Hagen before working as a teacher specialising in special needs education and the rehabilitation of children with learning difficulties and behavioural issues.

== Political career ==
=== Early beginnings ===
In 1976 Schmidt was a candidate of the Maoist "Kommunistischer Bund Westdeutschland" (KBW) (Communist League of West Germany) for the Federal Assembly of Germany (Bundestag) in Aachen. The KBW dissolved completely in 1985.

In 1983, Schmidt changed to the Social Democratic Party (SPD). There she is a member of the local (Aachen) leadership and of the "Seeheimer Kreis". She was elected to the German Bundestag in the first elections in reunified Germany on 2 December 1990, representing the Aachen I constituency.

=== Member of the Federal Government ===
As deputy leader of the Social Democratic parliamentary group between 1998 and 2001, Schmidt first gained respect in Parliament for her strong defense of pension reforms proposed by Chancellor Gerhard Schröder government in 2000.

After the resignation of incumbent Andrea Fischer, who took the blame for the government's chaotic response to the discovery of ten cases of bovine spongiform encephalopathy, Schmidt became Federal Minister for Health under Chancellor Gerhard Schröder in 2001. A year later, the responsibility for social security was added to her portfolio and she was appointed Federal Minister for Health and Social Security.

During her tenure as Germany's long-serving minister of health, Schmidt oversaw major system reforms, balancing social solidarity with fiscal responsibility. In September 2003, Schmidt worked to tighten the regulations allowing welfare benefits to German expatriates. Under the new rules, the only people to receive benefits are Germans who are receiving long-term medical treatment outside the country or who are in foreign jails.

In November 2005, Schmidt again became Federal Minister for Health in the grand coalition of Angela Merkel. Social security was reunited with the portfolio of labour, which in 2002 had been added to that of the Federal Minister for Economics. By 2006, Schmidt led negotiations for an agreement on changes to Germany's healthcare financing.

In July 2009, the Social Democrats' candidate to challenge incumbent Chancellor Angela Merkel, Frank Walter Steinmeier, dropped Schmidt from his campaign team for the federal elections, after she embarrassed the party by taking her official Mercedes and chauffeur on a vacation to Spain, where it was stolen and later returned. The SPD subsequently lost the elections.

=== Member of the German Bundestag ===
From February 2010, Schmidt was a member of the NATO Parliamentary Assembly and deputy chairwoman of the German delegation to that assembly. She also served as a member of the Subcommittee on Cultural and Education Policy Abroad of the Committee on Foreign Affairs and as a member of the Committee on Cultural and Media Affairs.

In 2010, Schmidt became chairwoman of Lebenshilfe, the association for people with mental disability, their families, experts and friends.

In her capacity as Vice President of the German Parliament, Schmidt also was a member of the parliament's Council of Elders, which – among other duties – determines daily legislative agenda items and assigns committee chairpersons based on party representation.

Schmidt announced, that she will not be reelected in 2021 German federal election.

== Other activities ==
=== Corporate boards ===
- K & S Unternehmensgruppe, Member of the Advisory Board
- Philips Germany, Member of the Supervisory Board
- Siegfried Holding, Member of the Supervisory Board (since 2016)
- Charité, Member of the Supervisory Board (–2020)

=== Non-profits ===
- 1014 – space for ideas, Member of the Board of Directors
- Aktion Mensch, Member of the Supervisory Board
- Atlantik-Brücke, Member
- German Commission for UNESCO, Member
- German Federal Film Board (FFA), Alternate Member of the Supervisory Board (–2014)
- German Red Cross, Member
- Goethe-Institut, Delegate to the General Meeting
- Haus der Geschichte, Member of the Board of Trustees (2009–2013)
- IG Bergbau, Chemie, Energie (IG BCE), Member
- Tarabya Academy, Member of the Advisory Board
- Terre des Femmes, Member
- UNITE – Parliamentary Network to End HIV/AIDS, Viral Hepatitis and Other Infectious Diseases, Member (since 2017)

== Controversies ==
Amid discussions on whether Iraq possesses the smallpox virus and that the Saddam Hussein regime has mobile factories capable of producing chemical and biological weapons, Schmidt recommended in 2003 that Germany stockpile smallpox vaccine to guard against a possible terrorist attack. In response, members of the conservative opposition accused Chancellor Gerhard Schröder's government of withholding a true picture of the threat from Iraq.

In 2009, Schmidt criticized statements made by Pope Benedict XVI, who claimed that condom usage promoted AIDS.
