= Paul Gavan =

Irish politician (born 1965)

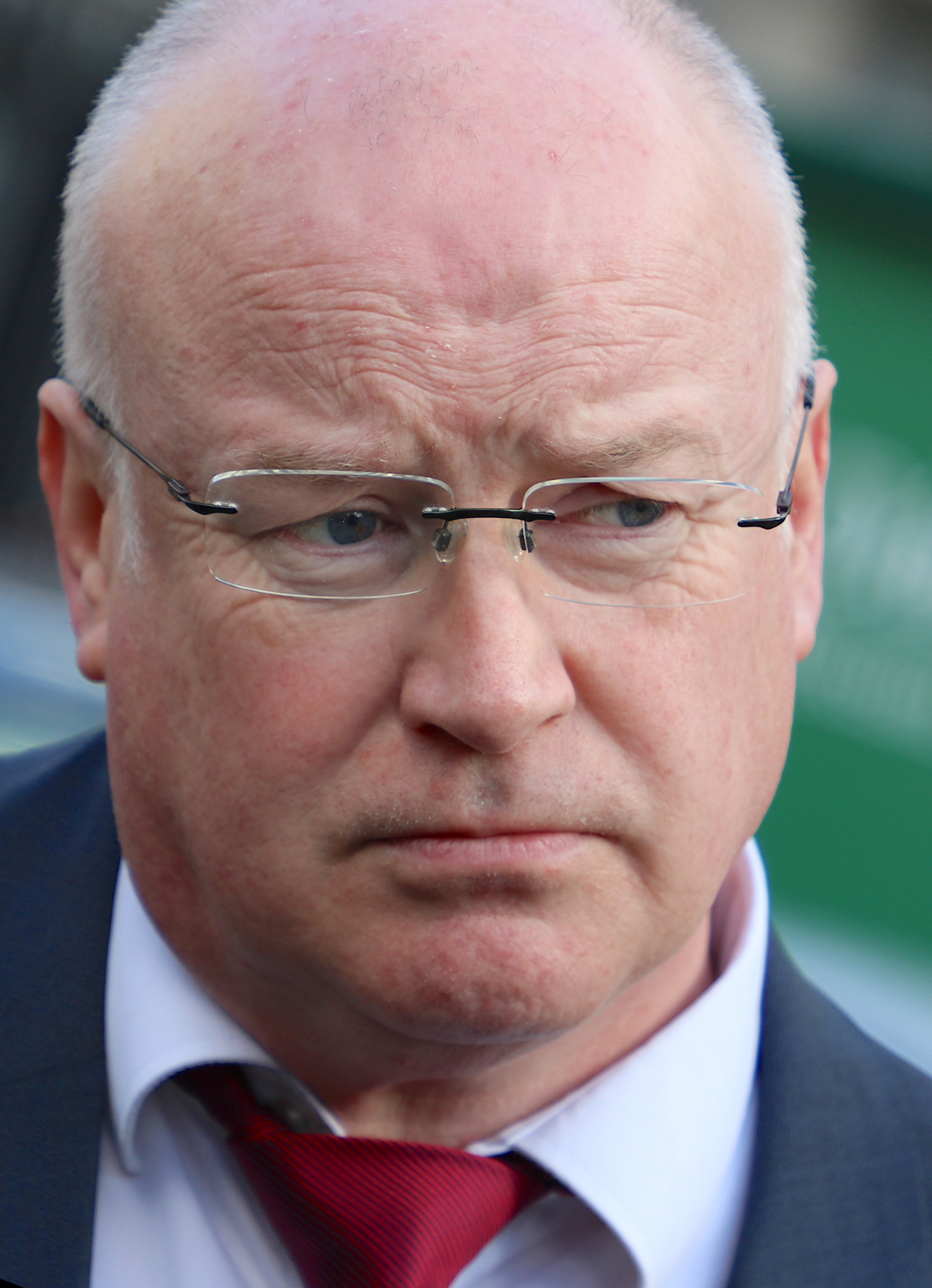
- Gavan in 2018

Senator
- In office 8 June 2016 – 30 January 2025
- Constituency: Labour Panel

Personal details
- Born: 29 November 1965 (age 60) Limerick, Ireland
- Party: Sinn Féin
- Spouse: Ursula Gavan
- Education: University of Limerick

Paul Gavan (born 29 November 1965) is an Irish Sinn Féin politician who served as a senator for the Labour Panel from April 2016 to January 2025.

He was the Sinn Féin Seanad spokesperson for Education and Workers Rights. He was also a member of the Parliamentary Assembly of the Council of Europe.

Gavan was an unsuccessful Sinn Féin candidate for the South constituency at the 2024 European Parliament election. He was an unsuccessful candidate at the 2024 general election for the Limerick City constituency.

His wife, Ursula Gavan, is a member of Limerick City and County Council. She was elected as a Sinn Féin councillor at the 2024 local elections but resigned from the party in January 2025.

He lost his seat at the 2025 Seanad election.
