= Katharina Willkomm =

German politician

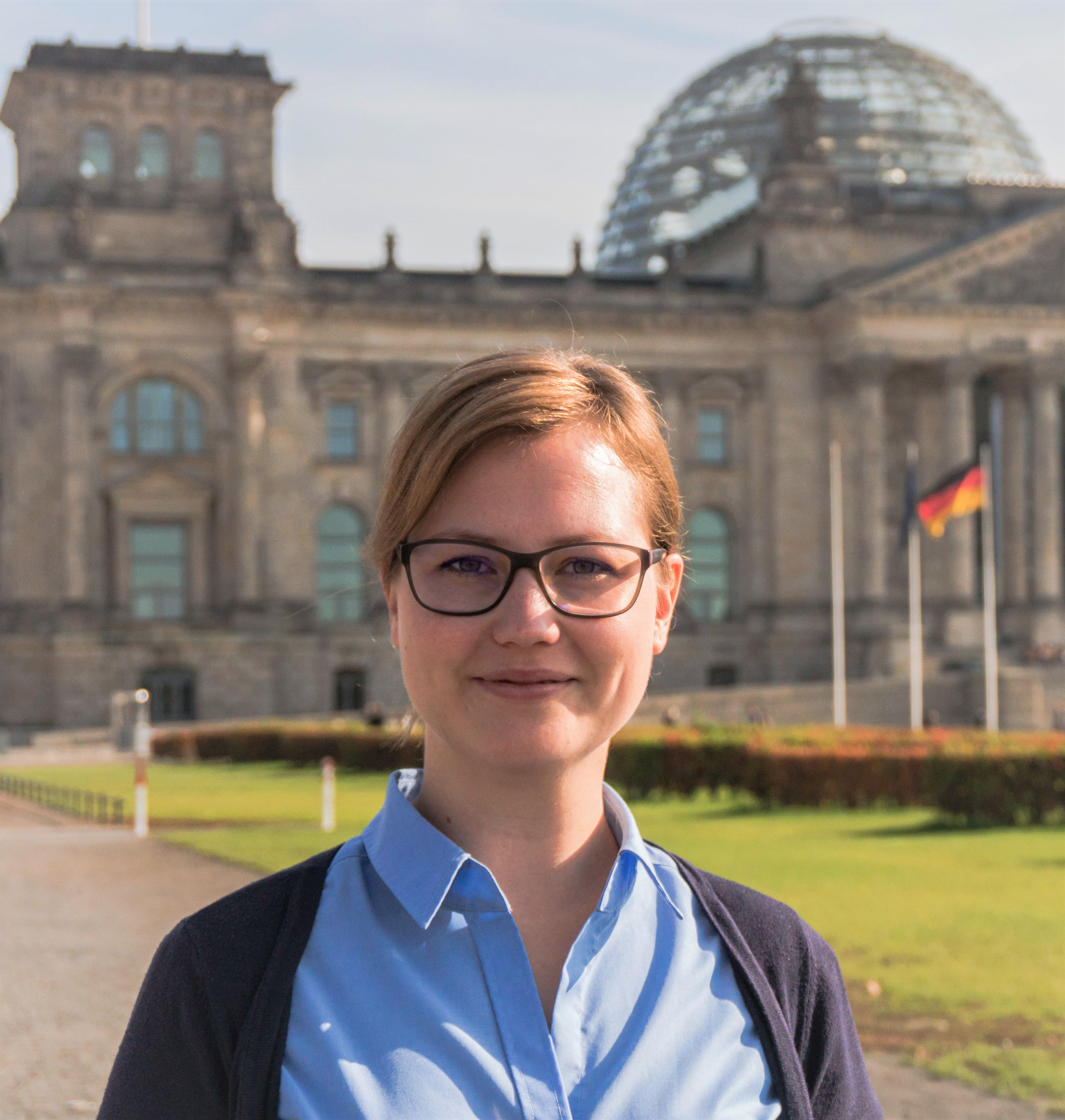
- Katharina Willkomm in 2019

Member of the Bundestag
- In office 2017–2021
- In office 2023–2025

Personal details
- Born: 19 February 1987 (age 39) Düsseldorf, West Germany (now Germany)
- Party: FDP
- Education: University of Bonn
- Occupation: Lawyer

Katharina Willkomm (née Kloke; born 19 February 1987) is a German lawyer and politician of the Free Democratic Party (FDP) who served as a member of the Bundestag from the state of North Rhine-Westphalia from 2017 to 2021 and again from 2023 to 2025.

In 2023, Willkomm re-joined the Bundestag taking the seat of Alexander Graf Lambsdorff who was appointed German ambassador to Russia.

== Early life and education ==
Willkomm was born in Düsseldorf, North Rhine-Westphalia. After graduating from high school, she studied law at the University of Bonn, which she completed with the first state examination. After the subsequent legal clerkship at the Aachen Regional Court, she passed the second state examination in 2017. Since then she has been working as a lawyer in a law firm in Stolberg.

== Political career ==
Willkomm became a member of the Bundestag in the 2017 German federal election, representing the Düren district. Since January 2018, she has been a member of the parliament's Committee on Legal Affairs and Consumer Protection and of the Electoral Review Committee. She also serves as her parliamentary group's spokeswoman for consumer protection.
