= Tarragona (Senate constituency) =

Senate of Spain constituency

Coordinates: 41°10′N 1°00′W

- Senate of Spain; Electoral constituency
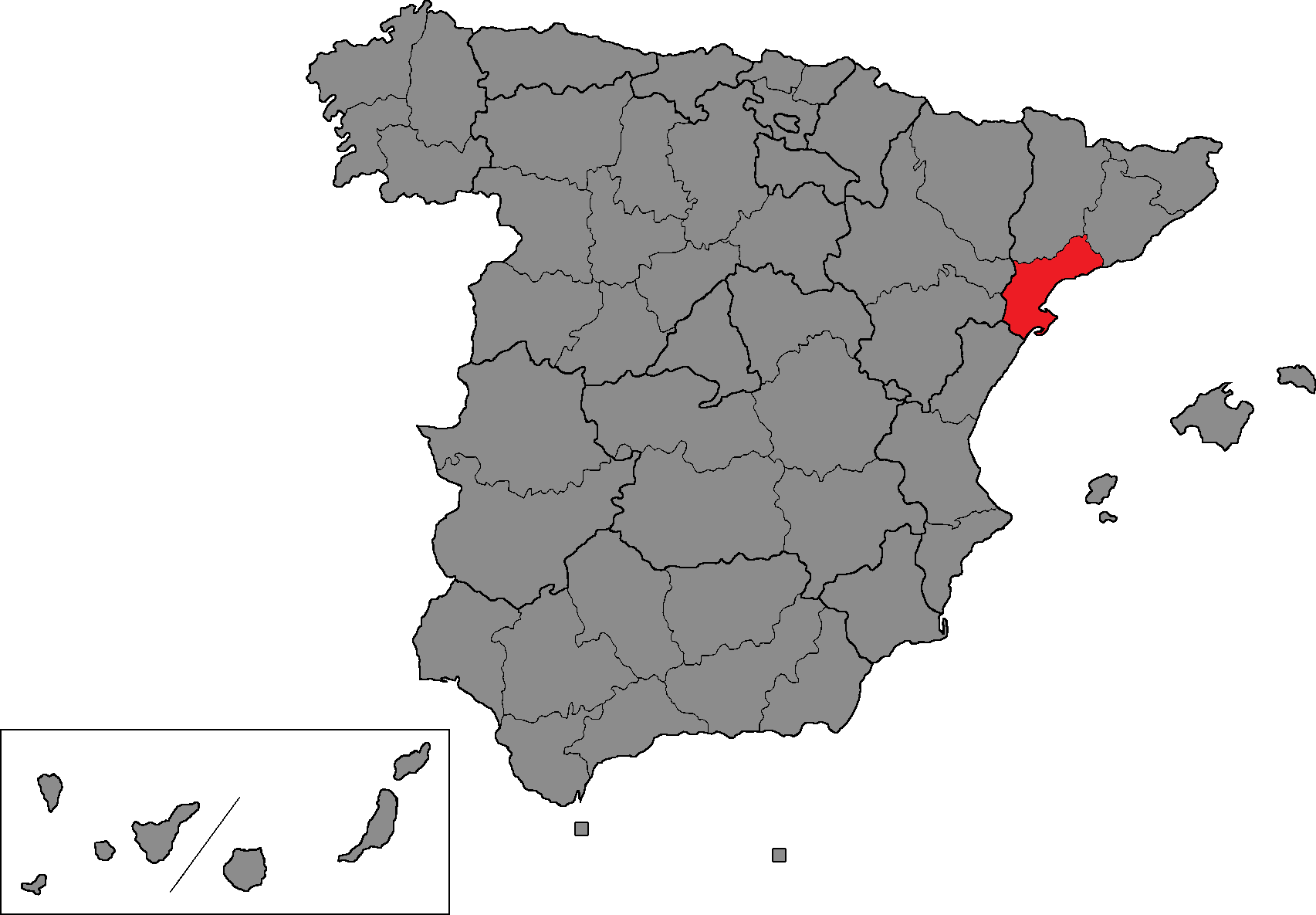
- Location of Tarragona within Spain
- Province: Tarragona
- Autonomous community: Catalonia
- Population: ▲861,531 (2024)
- Electorate: ▲596,689 (2023)
- Major settlements: Tarragona, Reus

Current constituency
- Created: 1977
- Seats: 4
- Members: PSC (3); ERC (1)

Tarragona is one of the 60 constituencies represented in the Senate of Spain, the upper chamber of the Spanish parliament, the Cortes Generales. The constituency (whose boundaries correspond to those of the homonymous province) elects four senators. The electoral system uses open-list (Note: Parties can group candidates into lists, although each candidate is treated separately for the purpose of the voting procedure.) partial block voting, with electors voting for individual candidates instead of parties. Electors can vote for up to three candidates.

== Electoral system ==
The constituency was created as per the Political Reform Law and was first contested in the 1977 general election. The Law provided for the provinces of Spain to be established as multi-member districts in the Senate, with this regulation being maintained under the Spanish Constitution of 1978. Additionally, the Constitution requires for any modification of the provincial limits to be approved under an organic law, needing an absolute majority in the Cortes Generales.

Voting is based on universal suffrage, comprising all Spanish nationals over 18 years of age with full political rights, provided that they have not been deprived of the right to vote by a final sentence. The only exception was in 1977, when this was limited to nationals over 21 years of age and in full enjoyment of their political and civil rights. Amendments in 2011 required non-resident citizens to apply for voting, a system known as "begged" voting (Spanish: Voto rogado). which was abolished in 2022. Further, amendments in 2018 granted the right to vote to those legally incapacitated. 209 Senate seats (207 in 1977, 208 from 1978 to 2026) are elected using open-list partial block voting: voters in constituencies electing four seats can choose up to three candidates; in those with two or three seats, up to two; and in single-member districts, one. Each of the 47 peninsular provinces is allocated four seats, while in insular provinces—such as the Balearic and Canary Islands—the districts are the islands themselves, with the larger ones (Mallorca, Gran Canaria and Tenerife) being allocated three seats each, and the smaller ones (Menorca, Ibiza, Formentera, Fuerteventura, La Gomera, El Hierro, Lanzarote and La Palma) one each. (Note: La Gomera and El Hierro comprised a single constituency for the 1977 election. A constitutional reform in 2026 awarded Formentera an independent senator separate from Ibiza.) Ceuta and Melilla elect two seats each. Until 1985, the law also provided for by-elections to fill Senate seats vacated up to two years into the legislature; subsequently, any vacancies arising after the proclamation of candidates and during the legislative term are filled by the next candidates on the party lists or, when required, by designated substitutes.

The electoral law allows for parties and federations registered in the interior ministry, alliances and groupings of electors to present lists of candidates. Parties and federations intending to form an alliance are required to inform the relevant electoral commission within 10 days of the election call—15 before 1985—whereas groupings of electors need to secure the signature of at least one percent of the electorate in the constituencies for which they seek election—one permille of the electorate, with a compulsory minimum of 500 signatures, until 1985—disallowing electors from signing for more than one list. Also since 2011, parties, federations or alliances that have not obtained a mandate in either chamber of the Cortes at the preceding election are required to secure the signature of at least 0.1 percent of electors in the aforementioned constituencies. Amendments in 2007 required a balanced composition of men and women in the electoral lists, so that candidates of either sex made up at least 40 percent of the total composition; further amendments in 2024 required the use of a zipper system.

== Senators ==
Senators for Tarragona 1977–
Key to parties EdC ECP ERC NE ECdP PSC CatSen DiL CiU UCD
Legislature	Election	Distribution
Constituent	1977	3 / 1
1st	1979	3 / 1
2nd	1982	3 / 1
3rd	1986	3 / 1
4th	1989	1 / 3
5th	1993	1 / 3
6th	1996	3 / 1
7th	2000	3 / 1
8th	2004	3 / 1
9th	2008	3 / 1
10th	2011	2 / 2
11th	2015	1 / 2 / 1
12th	2016	1 / 3
13th	2019 (Apr)	3 / 1
14th	2019 (Nov)	3 / 1
15th	2023	1 / 3

== General elections ==
=== 2023 ===
Summary of the 23 July 2023 Senate of Spain election results
Candidates	Parties and coalitions	Popular vote	
Candidates	Parties and coalitions	Votes	%
Manel de la Vega Carrera	PSC	106,923	30.80
Núria Rovira Costas	PSC	104,351	30.06
Mario Soler Santos	PSC	97,356	28.04
Jordi Gaseni Blanch	ERC	70,175	20.21
• Laura Castel Fort	ERC	65,250	18.79
• Josep Rufà Gràcia	ERC	59,705	17.19
• Rafael Luna Vivas	PP	49,398	14.23
• Montserrat Duch Cartañá	PP	48,019	13.83
• Miguel Ángel Cilleruelo Andrés	PP	46,302	13.33
• Josep Andreu Domingo	Junts	46,301	13.33
• María Elena Queral Castellà	Junts	42,563	12.26
• Eugeni Sedano Monasterio	Junts	39,014	11.23
• Nazaret Troya Cala	Sumar	37,274	10.73
• Tibor Rius Gerecz	Vox	28,592	8.23
• Francisco Pizarro Fernández	Sumar	28,346	8.16
• Antònia García Bascuñana	Sumar	28,188	8.12
• Isabel María Lorenzo Medina	Vox	27,671	7.97
• David Gracia Martínez	Vox	26,417	7.61
• Iñigo Manrique Romero	PACMA	7,254	2.08
• Debora Sebastian Marquez	PACMA	6,118	1.76
• Xavier Lopez Roure	PACMA	4,527	1.30
• Josepa Loos Maynou	PDeCAT	3,909	1.12
• Albert Sabate Altisent	PCTC	2,183	0.62
• Juan Francisco Martínez Ten	Recortes Cero	920	0.26
• Valentín Rodríguez Bonillo	EVC	752	0.21
• Esperanza Torrijos González	EVC	546	0.15
• Antonio Raya Ruiz	EVC	364	0.10
Blank ballots		6,502	1.87
Total		984920	
Valid votes		347,126	96.51
Invalid votes		12,550	3.48
Votes cast / turnout		359,676	63.25
Abstentions		208,947	36.74
Registered voters		568623	

=== November 2019 ===
Summary of the 10 November 2019 Senate of Spain election results in Tarragona
Candidates	Parties and coalitions	Popular vote	
Candidates	Parties and coalitions	Votes	%
Miquel Aubà i Fleix	ERC–Sobiranistes	120,622	32.12
Laura Castel i Fort	ERC–Sobiranistes	113,512	30.23
Josep Rufà i Gràcia	ERC–Sobiranistes	104,835	27.92
Santiago José Castellà Surribas	PSC–PSOE	71,199	18.96
• Joan Castor Gonell Agramunt	PSC–PSOE	67,132	17.88
• Maria Jesús Sequera Garcia	PSC–PSOE	66,353	17.67
• Hèctor López i Bofill	JxCat–Junts	58,176	15.49
• Assumpció Castellví i Auví	JxCat–Junts	50,942	13.56
• Anna Magrinyà i Vinyes	JxCat–Junts	46,460	12.37
• Carles Fuxet Garcia	ECP–Guanyem el Canvi	42,922	11.43
• Angeles Aguilera Méndez	ECP–Guanyem el Canvi	37,931	10.10
• José Juan Acero de Dios	PP	37,110	9.88
• Nuria Gómez Granès	PP	34,106	9.08
• Juan Vicente Martínez Navarro	ECP–Guanyem el Canvi	32,677	8.70
• Juan Manuel Sánchez Ramírez	PP	29,576	7.88
• Patricia Faura Fernández	Cs	25,857	6.89
• Alejandro Soler Baiget	Vox	25,604	6.82
• Cristina Satué Vallvé	Cs	22,266	5.93
• José Patiño Ribera	Cs	20,299	5.41
• Esther Cuadrado Jaro	PACMA	9,747	2.60
• Jordi Martínez Latorre	PACMA	6,021	1.60
• Estela Pascual Chamizo	PACMA	5,754	1.53
• José Juan Ferré Fornos	PCPC	1,662	0.44
• Juan Francisco Martínez Ten	Recortes Cero–GV	1,344	0.36
• Alicia Garrido Muñiz	PUM+J	1,135	0.30
• Anton Guerrero Calvo	PCTC	1,033	0.28
• José Ruiz Arana	IZQP	583	0.16
Blank ballots		6,449	1.72
Total		375,545	
Valid votes		375,545	97.68
Invalid votes		8,935	2.32
Votes cast / turnout		384,480	66.88
Abstentions		190,386	33.12
Registered voters		574,866	

== Bibliography ==
- Ley 1/1977, de 4 de enero, para la Reforma Política (Fundamental Law 1/1977). Official State Gazette (in Spanish). 4 January 1977. BOE-A-1977-165.
- Real Decreto-ley 20/1977, de 18 de marzo, sobre Normas Electorales (Royal Decree-Law 20/1977). Official State Gazette (in Spanish). 18 March 1977. BOE-A-1977-7445.
- Constitución Española (Constitution). Official State Gazette (in Spanish). 27 December 1978. BOE-A-1978-31229.
- Ley Orgánica 5/1985, de 19 de junio, del Régimen Electoral General (Organic Law 5/1985). Official State Gazette (in Spanish). 19 June 1985. BOE-A-1985-11672.
- Carreras de Odriozola, Albert; Tafunell Sambola, Xavier (2005) [1989]. Estadísticas históricas de España, siglos XIX-XX (PDF) (in Spanish). Vol. 1 (II ed.). Bilbao: Fundación BBVA. pp. 1072–1097. ISBN 84-96515-00-1. Archived from the original (PDF) on 24 September 2015.
