= Ceylan Akça Cupolo =

Turkish politician (born 1986)

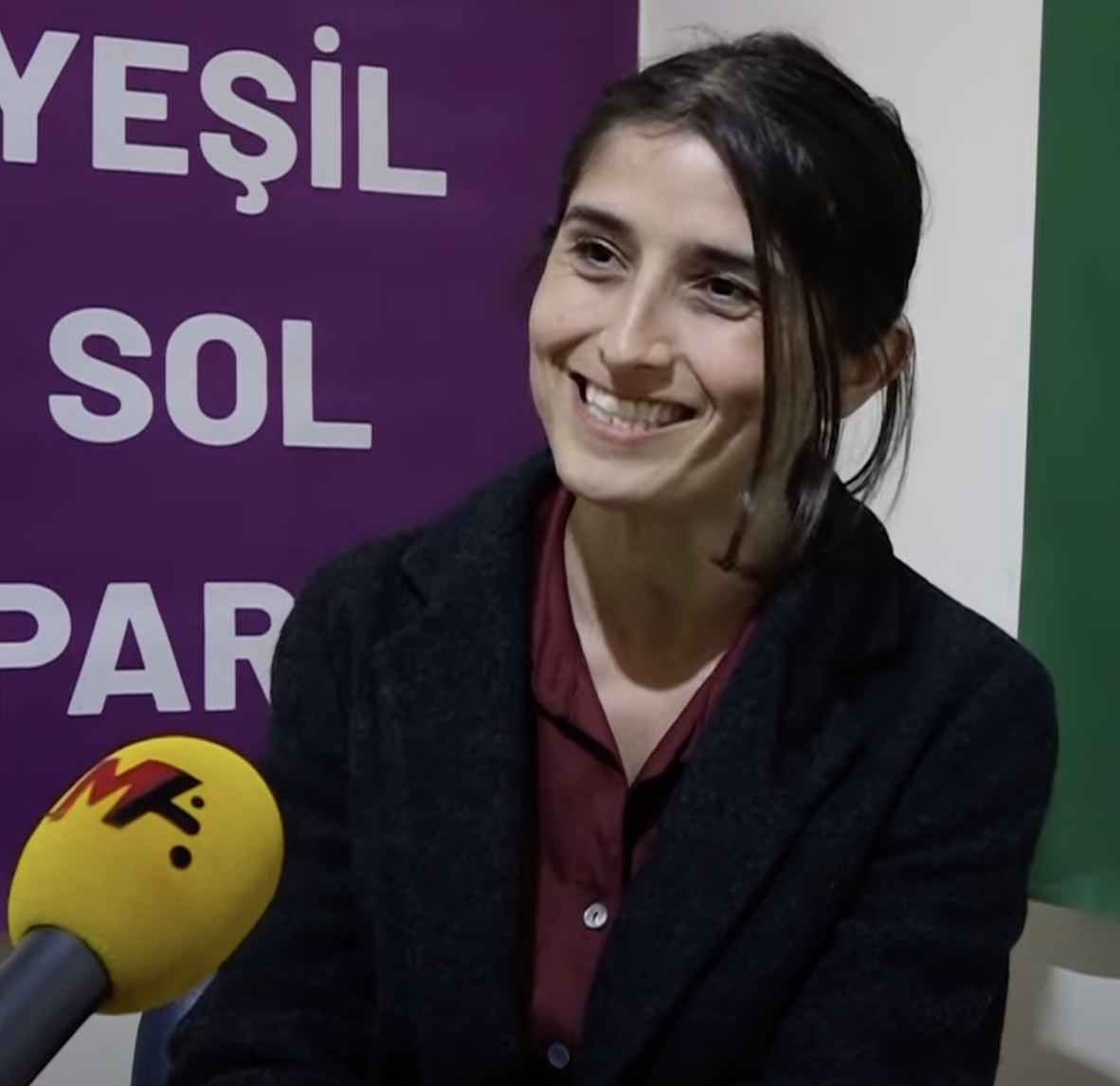

Ceylan Akça Cupolo (born 1986) is a politician of the Peoples' Equality and Democracy Party (DEM Party) and since June 2023 a member of the Grand National Assembly of Turkey

== Early life and education ==
Cupolo was born in Hazro, Turkey in 1986. She graduated from the Dokuz Eylül University in İzmir with a BSc in American culture and literature in 2009 and returned to the university in 2022 for her MSc. Following she became an advisor to the People's Democratic Party (HDP) for several years.

== Political career ==
During her electoral campaign to the parliamentary election in 2023, Ceylan Akça Cupolo aimed to defend the position of the Kurdish people and for that the Kurdish rights become included in the Turkish constitution. In May 2023, she was elected into the Grand National Assembly of Turkey, representing Diyarbakir for the YSP.

Political positions

She does not classify free elections to be free elections of the electoral campaign is not free as well. She is favor of a free press and opposed the detention of Merdan Yanardag for criticizing the long imprisonment of Abdullah Öcalan.

Advocacy for women’s rights

In October 2024, Akça Cupolo joined a protest march in Diyarbakır against femicide, organized by local civil society organizations. She accused the state of neglecting to protect women from perpetrators known to have histories of violence and criticized what she described as a “male order” complicit in systemic violence against women. Akça Cupolo urged women to organize collectively, stating that “an organized woman is a strong woman.”

== Personal life ==
Ceylan Akça Cupolo is married with the journalist from Al Monitor Diego Cupolo with who she has a child.
