= Oliver Krischer =

German politician (born 1969)

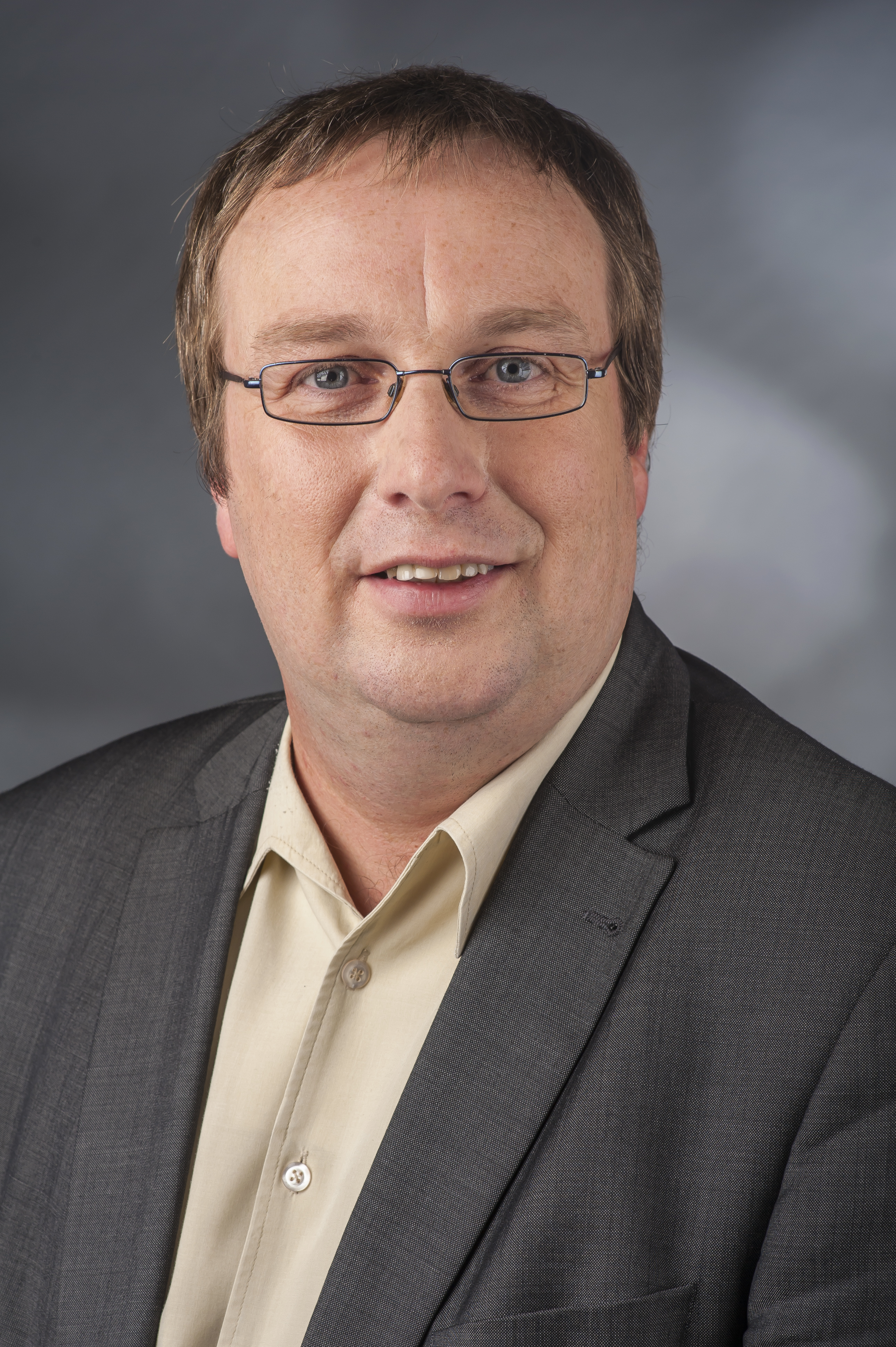
- Krischer in 2014

Minister for the Environment, Nature Protection, and Transport of North Rhine-Westphalia
- Incumbent
- Assumed office 29 June 2022
- Minister-President: Hendrik Wüst
- Preceded by: Andreas Pinkwart (Energy)

Parliamentary State Secretary for Economic Affairs and Climate Action
- In office 8 December 2021 – 29 June 2022 Serving with Michael Kellner, Franziska Brantner
- Minister: Robert Habeck
- Preceded by: Marco Wanderwitz; Elisabeth Winkelmeier-Becker; Thomas Bareiß
- Succeeded by: Stefan Wenzel

Member of the Bundestag; from North Rhine-Westphalia
- In office 27 October 2009 – 28 June 2022
- Preceded by: Multi-member district
- Succeeded by: Michael Sacher
- Constituency: State list (2009–2021); Aachen I (2021–2022)

Personal details
- Born: Oliver Michael Krischer; 26 July 1969 (age 57) Zülpich, West Germany
- Party: Alliance 90/The Greens
- Children: 2
- Education: RWTH Aachen
- Website: https://www.oliver-krischer.eu/

Oliver Krischer (born 26 July 1969) is a German politician of the Alliance 90/The Greens who has been serving as State Minister for Environment, Nature Protection, and Transport in the government of Minister-President of North Rhine-Westphalia Hendrik Wüst since 2022.

From 2021 to 2022, Krischer briefly served as Parliamentary State Secretary in the Federal Ministry for Economic Affairs and Climate Action in the coalition government of Chancellor Olaf Scholz since 2021. He was a member of the Bundestag from 2009 to 2022.

== Education and early career ==
Krischer was born in Zülpich, West Germany. He grew up in Heimbach (Eifel; Germany). After the A-Levels and civilian service he studied biology at RWTH Aachen. From 1997 to 2002 he worked for Michaele Hustedt, a former member of the German Bundestag. From 2002 to 2009 he worked as scientific assistant for the Green parliamentary group in North Rhine-Westphalia in the thematic fields of energy, agriculture and land use regulation.

== Political career ==
In 1989, Krischer joined the Green Party. Since 1994 he is member of the Kreistag and became chairman of the parliamentary group in 1997. He became district chairman of his party in 2005 and was elected in the Bezirksvorstand Mittelrhein in 2006. From 2001 to 2006 he served as chairman of the Biological Station in Düren.

=== Member of the German Bundestag (2009–2022) ===
In the 2009 federal elections, Krischer was elected into the German Bundestag via his nomination on the Green ballot list.

In his first term between 2009 and 2013, Krischer was a member of the Committee on Economic Affairs and Technology and an alternate member of the Committee on the Environment, Conservation and Reactor Safety. He also served as his parliamentary group's spokesperson on energy and resource efficiency. In addition, he chaired its working group on energy and climate.

From 2013 until 2021, Krischer served as vice chairman of the Green Party's parliamentary group under the leadership of co-chairs Katrin Göring-Eckardt and Anton Hofreiter; in this role, he was responsible for the topics, energy, environment, climate, reactor safety, animal protection, agriculture and transportation. He was a deputy member of the Committee on Economic Affairs and Energy and the Committee on Transport and Digital Infrastructure. Besides this he was the vice-chairman of the parliamentary inquiry into the Volkswagen emissions scandal (Dieselgate).

In the 2021 German federal election, he was elected to a direct mandate in Aachen I.

In the negotiations to form a so-called traffic light coalition of the Social Democrats (SPD), the Green Party and the FDP following the 2021 federal elections, Krischer led his party's delegation in the working group on environmental policy; his co-chairs from the other parties are Matthias Miersch and Lukas Köhler.

=== Career in state government ===
In the negotiations to form a coalition government under the leadership of Minister-President of North Rhine-Westphalia Hendrik Wüst following the 2022 state elections, Krischer was part of his party’s delegation.

== Other activities ==
=== Regulatory agencies ===
- Federal Network Agency for Electricity, Gas, Telecommunications, Post and Railway (BNetzA), Member of the Advisory Board

=== Corporate boards ===
- NRW.BANK, Ex-Officio Member of the Supervisory Board (since 2022)
- AWA Entsorgung GmbH, Member of the Supervisory Board

=== Non-profit organizations ===
- Bundesverband Bioenergie (BBE), Member of the Advisory Board
- German Renewable Energy Federation (BEE), Member of the Parliamentary Advisory Board
- Heinrich Böll Foundation, Member of the Supervisory Board
- Friends of the Eifel National Park, Chairman of the Board
- Friends of the Earth Germany (BUND), Member
- Nature And Biodiversity Conservation Union (NABU), Member
- Society for the prevention of cruelty to animals (Tierschutzverein) in the administrative district Düren, Member
- German Energy Agency (DENA), Ex-Officio Chairman of the Supervisory Board (2021–2022)
- Agora Energiewende, Member of the Council (–2021)
- German Industry Initiative for Energy Efficiency (DENEFF), Member of the Parliamentary Advisory Board (–2021)
- Eurosolar, Member of the Board (2011–2013)

== Personal life ==
Krischer currently lives in Düren with his wife and their two sons. In Berlin, he shared an apartment with Katja Dörner.
