= 2020 North Rhine-Westphalia local elections =

Local election in Germany

Local elections were held in the German state of North Rhine-Westphalia on 13 September 2020 to elect district, municipal, and city councils and local boards, as well as mayors in most cities and district administrators in most districts. The 91-member Ruhr Parliament was also elected for the first time. Runoff elections for mayors and district administrators were held on 27 September where necessary.

All EU citizens aged 16 or over on election day were eligible to vote if they had lived in a municipality for at least sixteen days.

== Background and electoral system ==
Local elections take place every five years in North-Rhine Westphalia. However, the previous round of elections had taken place in May 2014. These offices were granted an extraordinary one-time extension to six and a half years in order to synchronise municipal and district council terms with those of mayors and district administrators. The latter offices previously had terms of six years, which was reduced to five years from 2020 onwards. All offices were thus elected simultaneously in September 2020.

Most bodies with multiple members, such as councils, are elected via mixed-member proportional representation, with half of the membership elected in single-member constituencies. Voters have one vote, which is cast for both a constituency candidate and associated party list. There is no electoral threshold. Local boards and the Ruhr Parliament are elected via pure party-list proportional representation with a 2.5% threshold. Elections to a single position, such as mayors and district administrators, are conducted via the two-round system.

The number of members on each district and city/municipal council is determined by the number of residents it serves and may vary between 20 and 90 members, not counting overhang and leveling seats that can emerge during elections. Councils may legislate to reduce their number of members by up to ten relative to the size bracket they fall into, to a minimum of 20 members.

== Parties ==
The table below lists the results of the 2014 local elections in the rural districts and the urban districts.

Name		Ideology	2014 result	
Name		Ideology	Votes (%)	Seats
CDU	Christian Democratic Union of Germany	Christian democracy	37.5%	1,309 / 3,494
SPD	Social Democratic Party of Germany	Social democracy	31.4%	1,109 / 3,494
Grüne	Alliance 90/The Greens	Green politics	11.7%	396 / 3,494
Linke	The Left	Democratic socialism	4.7%	164 / 3,494
WG	Voter Groups	Localism	4.5%	160 / 3,494
FDP	Free Democratic Party	Classical liberalism	4.7%	159 / 3,494
AfD	Alternative for Germany	Right-wing populism	2.6%	89 / 3,494
Piraten	Pirate Party Germany	Pirate politics	1.7%	56 / 3,494
Others		–	1.2%	52 / 3,494

== Results ==
Party	Votes	%	Swing	Seats	+/-
Christian Democratic Union of Germany (CDU)	2,495,743	34.3	▼3.2	1,213	▼96
Social Democratic Party of Germany (SPD)	1,766,181	24.3	▼7.1	912	▼197
Alliance 90/The Greens (GRÜNE)	1,452,571	20.0	▲8.3	705	▲309
Free Democratic Party (FDP)	405,139	5.6	▲0.8	198	▲39
Alternative for Germany (AfD)	367,433	5.0	▲2.5	185	▲96
Voter Groups (WG)	323,825	4.4	▼0.1	170	▲10
The Left (LINKE)	277,781	3.8	▼0.8	137	▼27
Die PARTEI	76,317	1.0	▲1.0	34	▲31
Volt Germany (Volt)	37,590	0.5	New	13	New
Pirate Party Germany (Piraten)	24,812	0.3	▼1.3	10	▼46
Ecological Democratic Party (ÖDP)	6,990	0.1	0.0	3	▼1
Human Environment Animal Protection Party (Tierschutzpartei)	6,751	0.1	▲0.1	3	▲2
Action Party for Animal Protection (Tierschutz hier!)	5,172	0.1	New	2	New
Family Party of Germany (FAMILIE)	4,907	0.1	▲0.1	2	▲1
Aufbruch C	3,967	0.1	New	2	New
Alliance for Innovation and Justice (BIG)	3,553	0.0	▼0.1	2	▲1
German Communist Party (DKP)	2,886	0.0	0.0	2	0
Democracy by Referendum (Volksabstimmung)	3,021	0.0	0.0	1	0
The Right (Die Rechte)	2,582	0.0	0.0	1	▼1
Centre Party (Zentrum)	2,238	0.0	▼0.1	1	0
Party for Social Affairs and Ecology (SO!)	1,896	0.0	0.0	1	0
Other parties	5,197	0.1	▼1.3	0	▼35
Independents	1,667	0.0	0.0	0	0
Total	7,277,932	100.0		3,598	▲104
Blank/invalid votes	108,285	1.5			
Registered voters/turnout	14,235,746	51.9	▲1.9		
Source: State Returning Officer

=== Results in independent cities ===
City councils
City	CDU	SPD	Grüne	FDP	AfD	Linke	PARTEI	Volt	WG	Others
Cologne	21.5	21.6	28.5	5.3	4.4	6.5	2.5	5.0	4.7	0.2
Düsseldorf	33.4	17.9	24.0	9.2	3.6	4.1	1.8	1.8	1.8	2.4
Dortmund	22.5	30.0	24.8	3.5	5.5	5.6	2.8	–	1.9	3.3
Essen	34.4	24.3	18.6	3.0	7.5	3.9	2.5	0.2	3.3	2.3
Duisburg	21.5	30.8	17.7	3.1	9.3	5.5	1.1	–	10.4	0.5
Bochum	20.8	33.7	22.2	3.3	5.6	6.1	2.3	–	5.7	0.3
Wuppertal	24.2	28.9	19.6	7.2	6.1	6.6	2.7	–	4.3	0.3
Bielefeld	27.7	24.9	22.3	7.0	3.4	6.1	2.9	–	4.4	1.0
Bonn	25.7	15.6	27.9	5.2	3.2	6.2	2.2	5.1	7.1	2.0
Münster	32.7	17.6	30.3	4.6	2.2	4.9	2.1	2.6	1.2	1.8
Mönchengladbach	34.0	25.2	21.2	5.5	5.9	4.1	2.7	–	–	1.4
Gelsenkirchen	23.2	35.1	12.2	4.0	12.9	3.5	2.0	–	4.8	2.2
Aachen	24.8	18.3	34.1	4.9	3.7	4.6	2.3	3.7	1.6	1.9
Krefeld	30.4	28.5	20.1	5.8	5.4	3.2	2.5	–	3.6	0.5
Oberhausen	32.8	31.7	14.4	3.0	7.6	5.1	–	–	4.6	0.8
Hagen	27.5	25.5	13.3	4.6	9.3	2.9	2.8	–	13.0	1.0
Hamm	33.4	37.1	12.7	5.1	4.7	2.9	–	–	3.8	0.3
Mülheim an der Ruhr	26.3	21.3	23.4	4.7	7.2	2.7	4.4	–	9.6	0.4
Leverkusen	27.8	25.2	18.2	4.8	5.7	4.5	–	–	14.8	–
Solingen	30.2	28.3	18.2	5.5	5.0	4.2	2.4	–	5.9	0.1
Herne	20.0	44.1	15.8	3.3	8.4	4.1	–	–	2.5	1.7
Bottrop	23.9	40.2	12.8	4.1	7.0	3.4	–	–	–	8.4
Remscheid	29.9	34.5	14.7	5.3	1.0	4.6	–	–	10.2	–

Mayors
City	Elected mayor	Party/Ticket	Result	
City	Elected mayor	Party/Ticket	1st round	2nd round
Cologne	Henriette Reker	Independent	45.1%	59.3%
Düsseldorf	Stephan Keller	CDU	34.1%	56.0%
Dortmund	Thomas Westphal	SPD	35.9%	52.1%
Essen	Thomas Kufen	CDU	54.3%	
Bochum	Thomas Eiskirch	SPD/Grüne	61.8%	
Wuppertal	Uwe Schneidewind	CDU/Grüne	40.8%	53.5%
Bielefeld	Pit Clausen	SPD	39.7%	56.1%
Bonn	Katja Dörner	Grüne	27.6%	56.3%
Münster	Markus Lewe	CDU	44.6%	52.6%
Mönchengladbach	Felix Heinrichs	SPD	74.2%	
Gelsenkirchen	Karin Welge	SPD	40.4%	59.4%
Aachen	Sibylle Keupen	Grüne	38.9%	67.4%
Krefeld	Frank Meyer	SPD	43.4%	62.4%
Oberhausen	Daniel Schranz	CDU	45.5%	62.1%
Hagen	Erik O. Schulz	CDU/Grüne/FDP	51.1%	
Hamm	Marc Herter	SPD	40.7%	63.6%
Mülheim an der Ruhr	Marc Buchholz	CDU	25.4%	56.9%
Leverkusen	Uwe Richrath	SPD	46.1%	70.0%
Solingen	Tim-Oliver Kurzbach	SPD/Grüne	55.4%	
Herne	Frank Dudda	SPD	63.4%	
Bottrop	Bernd Tischler	SPD	73.1%	
Remscheid	Burkhard Mast-Weisz	SPD/Grüne	60.6%	

=== Results in districts ===
District councils
City	CDU	SPD	Grüne	FDP	AfD	Linke	PARTEI	Pirate	WG	Others
Recklinghausen	33.6	30.4	17.2	4.5	7.1	4.2	–	–	2.9	0.2
Rhein-Sieg-Kreis	39.4	21.5	21.8	5.7	4.6	3.2	–	1.2	1.2	1.4
Aachen	31.9	25.1	24.6	5.0	4.9	3.7	2.0	1.2	1.0	0.6
Mettmann	38.6	17.3	22.5	6.4	5.6	3.2	–	1.9	4.6	–
Rhein-Erft-Kreis	38.0	24.7	18.6	5.2	5.4	3.2	–	1.5	3.4	–
Wesel	32.8	29.7	19.0	5.5	5.6	4.1	–	–	3.3	–
Rhein-Kreis Neuss	37.8	23.2	19.0	6.9	4.5	2.3	1.9	–	3.3	1.2
Steinfurt	39.6	24.3	19.4	5.8	3.0	3.1	–	–	4.8	–
Märkischer Kreis	38.1	22.8	14.2	7.5	5.7	4.3	–	–	7.2	–
Unna	27.2	32.1	19.3	4.8	5.0	3.4	–	–	6.5	1.6
Borken	49.4	15.8	15.0	6.0	2.9	2.1	–	–	8.7	0.1
Gütersloh	39.1	19.2	21.0	5.8	4.4	2.4	0.4	–	7.6	–
Lippe	29.4	29.7	19.7	6.9	5.8	3.2	–	–	2.6	2.6
Ennepe-Ruhr-Kreis	26.8	31.3	20.8	5.8	5.3	3.8	–	2.5	3.7	–
Kleve	44.1	19.6	19.6	6.4	4.0	1.8	–	–	4.4	–
Minden-Lübbecke	35.8	28.3	16.8	6.5	5.9	2.8	–	–	3.5	0.4
Paderborn	46.8	15.5	18.2	5.6	4.9	3.2	2.2	–	2.8	0.6
Soest	41.9	20.3	16.4	6.7	4.5	2.7	–	–	6.0	1.4
Viersen	42.0	19.4	20.9	7.1	3.9	2.8	2.0	0.5	1.4	–
Rheinisch-Bergischer Kreis	37.2	18.8	24.4	6.5	4.8	2.9	–	–	5.4	–
Warendorf	41.3	20.7	18.8	6.3	3.4	2.5	1.5	–	5.6	–
Siegen-Wittgenstein	33.7	30.0	14.0	6.1	6.7	3.5	–	–	6.0	–
Oberbergischer Kreis	39.4	21.4	17.3	7.0	5.9	3.0	–	–	6.0	–
Düren	41.0	25.2	15.0	4.4	6.4	2.6	–	1.1	4.3	0.1
Hochsauerlandkreis	48.3	21.2	13.6	6.1	3.7	2.0	–	–	5.1	–
Heinsberg	51.5	15.6	16.7	4.9	4.3	2.7	–	–	3.8	0.5
Herford	29.9	35.4	16.0	3.8	5.9	3.3	2.9	–	2.9	–
Coesfeld	47.0	16.9	21.7	5.5	0.6	2.3	–	–	3.9	2.1
Euskirchen	38.5	23.9	15.1	7.9	6.5	2.4	0.8	–	4.9	–
Höxter	46.6	18.1	14.4	4.9	4.4	1.8	0.5	–	9.3	–
Olpe	51.6	18.4	12.2	4.3	4.0	2.0	–	–	7.5	–

District administrators
City	Elected administrator	Party/Ticket	Result	
City	Elected administrator	Party/Ticket	1st round	2nd round
Recklinghausen	Bodo Klimpel	CDU/FDP	38.3%	50.5%
Rhein-Sieg-Kreis	Sebastian Schuster	CDU	53.2%	
Aachen	No election			
Mettmann	Thomas Hendele	CDU	51.0%	
Rhein-Erft-Kreis	Frank Rock	CDU	44.5%	57.3%
Wesel	Ingo Brohl	CDU	36.4	53.5%
Rhein-Kreis Neuss	Hans-Jürgen Petrauschke	CDU	49.7^%	59.8%
Steinfurt	Martin Sommer	Independent	28.1%	68.7%
Märkischer Kreis	Marco Voge	CDU	42.1%	56.3%
Unna	Mario Löhr	SPD	41.1%	61.9%
Borken	Kai Zwicker	CDU	67.2%	
Gütersloh	Sven-Georg Adenauer	CDU	54.4%	
Lippe	Axel Lehmann	SPD	40.3%	56.0%
Ennepe-Ruhr-Kreis	Olaf Schade	SPD/GRÜNE	61.6%	
Kleve	Silke Gorißen	CDU	48.7%	54.2%
Minden-Lübbecke	Anna Katharina Bölling	CDU	46.3	63.7%
Paderborn	Christoph Rüther	CDU	53.4%	
Soest	Eva Irrgang	CDU	56.5%	
Viersen	Andreas Coenen	CDU	54.1%	
Rheinisch-Bergischer Kreis	No election			
Warendorf	Olaf Gericke	CDU/FDP	63.2%	
Siegen-Wittgenstein	Andreas Müller	SPD	54.4%	
Oberbergischer Kreis	Jochen Hagt	CDU	63.5%	
Düren	Wolfgang Spelthahn	CDU	57.8%	
Hochsauerlandkreis	Karl Schneider	CDU	58.7%	
Heinsberg	Stephan Pusch	CDU	79.9%	
Herford	Jürgen Müller	SPD/GRÜNE	56.3%	
Coesfeld	Christian Schulze Pellengahr	CDU	66.7%	
Euskirchen	Markus Ramers	SPD	40.1%	60.4%
Höxter	Michael Stickeln	CDU	72.9%	
Olpe	Theo Melcher	CDU	65.8%	

=== Ruhr Parliament ===
Party	Votes	%	Seats
Social Democratic Party of Germany (SPD)	540,753	29.9	29
Christian Democratic Union of Germany (CDU)	499,847	27.2	27
Alliance 90/The Greens (GRÜNE)	373,953	20.3	20
Alternative for Germany (AfD)	129,822	7.1	7
The Left (LINKE)	75,769	4.1	4
Free Democratic Party (FDP)	68,096	3.7	4
Die PARTEI	39,804	2.2	0
Action Party for Animal Protection (Tierschutz hier!)	36,601	2.0	0
Free Voters NRW (FW)	14,733	0.8	0
Pirate Party Germany (Piraten)	12,963	0.7	0
Volt Germany (Volt)	9,512	0.5	0
Duisburger Alternative List (DAL)	7,308	0.4	0
UWG: Free Citizens	5,528	0.3	0
Independent Citizens Party (UBP)	5,210	0.3	0
Ecological Democratic Party (ÖDP)	4,949	0.3	0
National Alliance Ruhr Region	4,239	0.2	0
Idea Community Ruhr (iGemRuhr)	3,570	0.2	0
The Violets (DIE VIOLETTEN)	2,671	0.1	0
Alliance C – Christians for Germany (Bündnis C)	1,894	0.1	0
Grassroots Democracy Now (Basisdemokratie jetzt)	1,834	0.1	0
Active (Aktiv)	1,072	0.1	0
Total	1,840,128	100.0	91
Blank/invalid votes	35,191	1.9	
Registered voters/turnout	3,983,971	47.1	
Source: State Returning Officer
