= Dehnert =

Dehnert is a German surname. Notable people with the surname include:

- Amanda Dehnert, American theater director and professor
- Dutch Dehnert (1898–1979), American basketball player and coach
- Fred Dehnert (1928–1983), Dutch tennis player
- Gonca Türkeli-Dehnert (born 1975), German lawyer and government official
- Red Dehnert (1924–1994), American basketball player and coach
