= Nathanael Liminski =

German politician

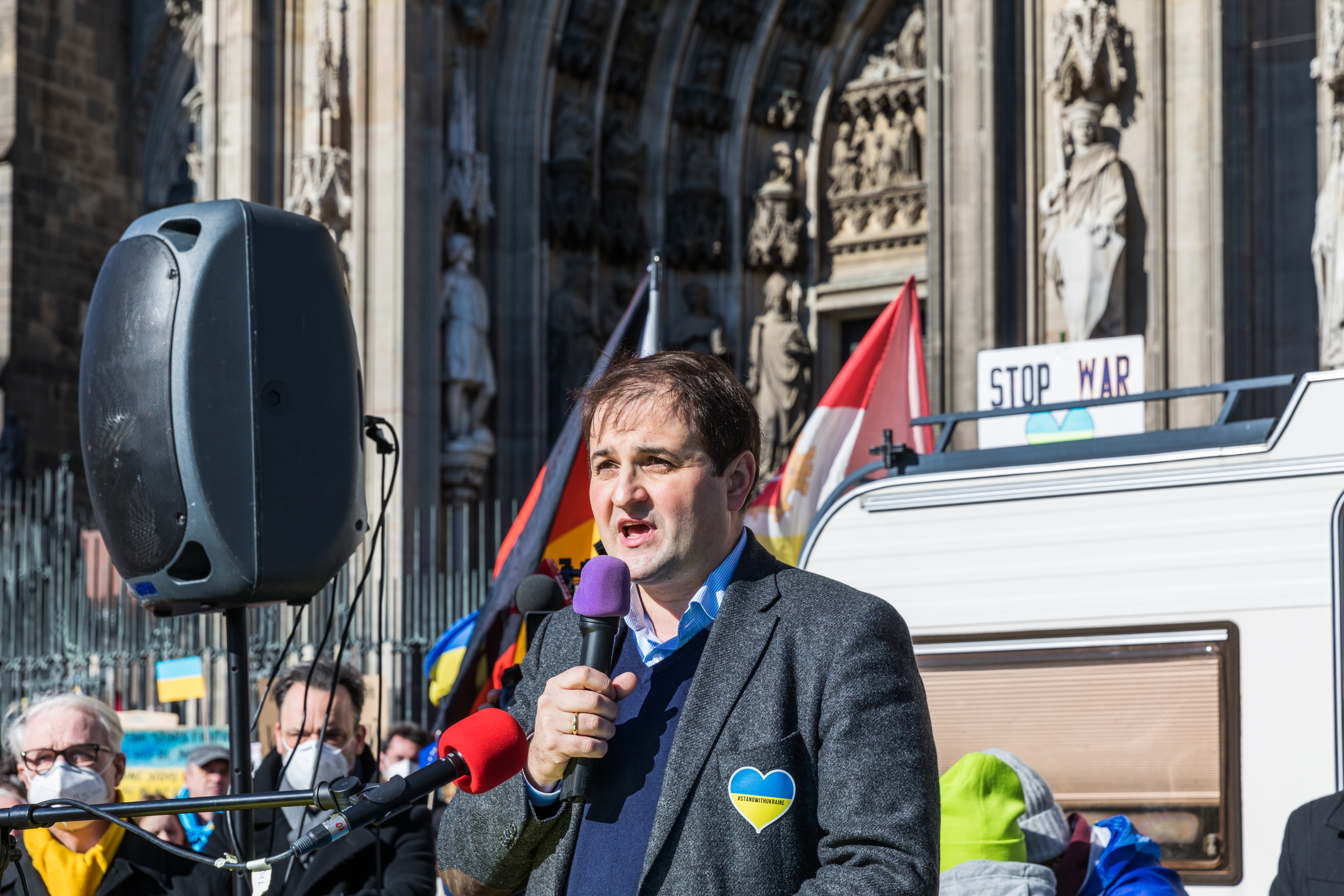
Nathanael Liminski at a demonstration against the Russian invasion of Ukraine in Cologne (2022)

Nathanael Liminski (born 19 September 1985) is a German politician from the Christian Democratic Union (CDU). Since 30 June 2017, he has been Head of the State Chancellery of North Rhine-Westphalia (NRW) and since June 29, 2022 Minister for Federal, European and International Affairs and the Media. Liminski was considered the irreplaceable "mastermind" and most important confidant of former Prime Minister and failed CDU chancellor candidate Armin Laschet and is now perceived as a close collaborator of new Prime Minister Hendrik Wüst.

== Biography ==
=== Family and Religion ===
Nathanael Liminski was born in Bonn and grew up with seven older and two younger siblings in Sankt Augustin in a Roman Catholic family that is closely associated with the lay organization Opus Dei.

He gained attention as the voice of the Generation Benedict, a group of young pope-loyal and conservative Catholics, which Liminski co-founded in the wake of the World Youth Day 2005. In this role, he was a guest on German TV talk shows, like Maischberger and Hart aber fair.

Liminski is married, has four children and lives with his family in Düsseldorf-Benrath.

=== Education and professional career ===
Liminski graduated from high school in 2005, then worked for a few months as a research assistant for CDU Bundestag member Christa Reichard and did an internship in the United States Congress in Washington for several months as an employee of the Subcommittee on Criminal Justice, Drug Policy, and Human Resources, chaired by Republican Congressman Mark Souder.

He studied Medieval and Modern History with a minor in Political science and Constitutional law from 2006 to 2010 at the University of Bonn and the Sorbonne University in Paris.

In 2009, Liminski worked as a parliamentary assistant of Martin Kastler (CSU) in the European Parliament. He began his ministry career in 2010 in the Hessian State Chancellery as a speechwriter for Prime Minister Roland Koch (CDU). In January 2011, he moved to the planning staff of the Federal Ministry of Defence. Minister Karl-Theodor zu Guttenberg (CSU) resigned one month later because of the affair on his plagiarized doctoral thesis, so Liminski moved to work for Guttenberg's successor, Thomas de Maizière (CDU). Liminski moved in the beginning of 2014 with de Maizière to the Ministry of the Interior following a reshuffle after the 2013 federal election.

In August 2014 he moved to work for Armin Laschet, who was opposition leader in the Landtag of North Rhine-Westphalia at this time.

== Politics ==
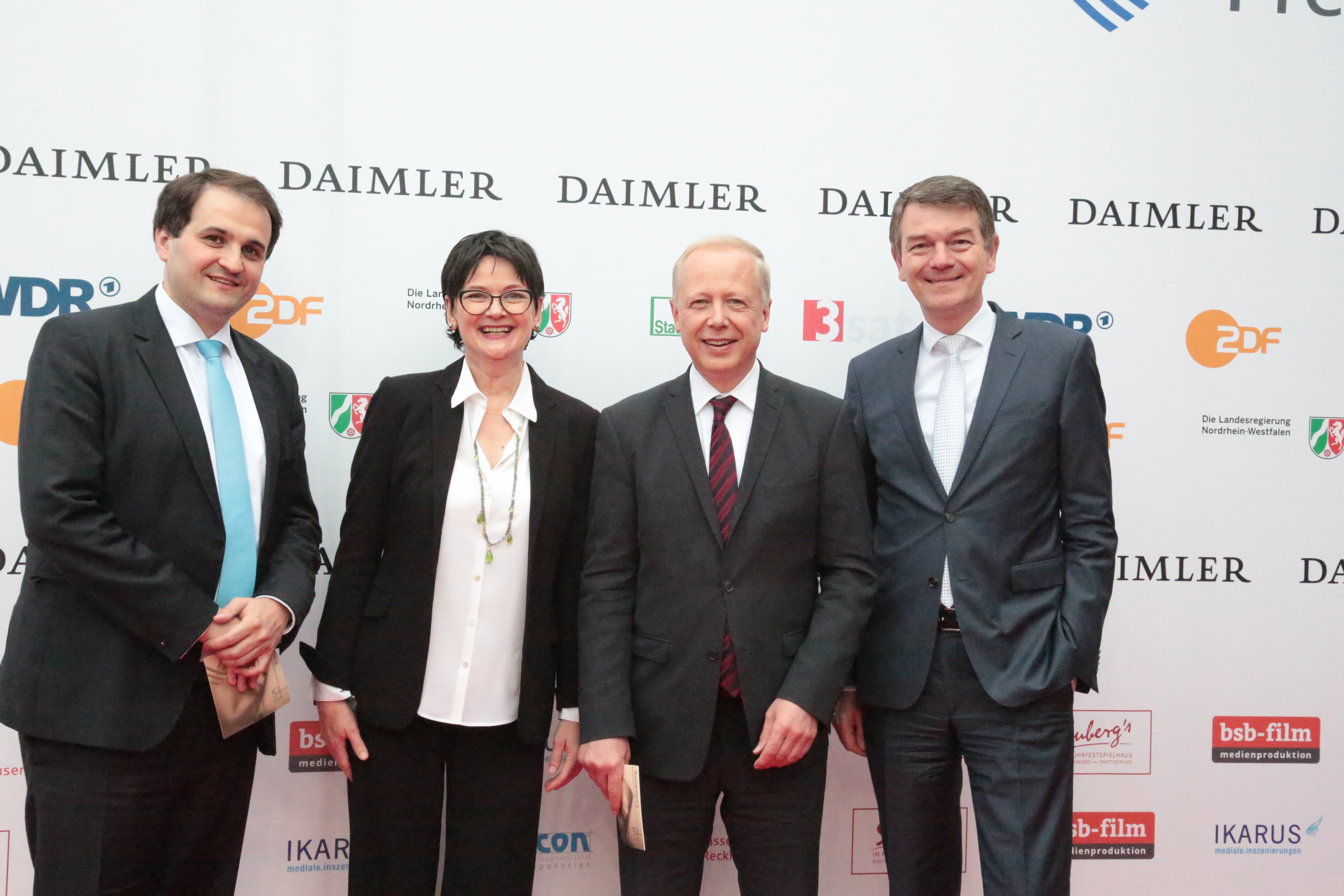
Nathanael Liminski (far left) in April 2018 at the awarding of the Grimme-Preis in Marl

Liminski became member of the CDU in his youth and is seen as part of the conservative wing of the Union. He held various positions in the NRW state board of the Student Union and the Young Union (JU) and was from 2011 to 2017 editor-in-chief of the JU member magazine Entscheidung (german: Decision).

From August 2014 on, Liminski was parliamentary group manager and Office Manager of Armin Laschet during his tenure as chairman of the CDU parliamentary group in the North Rhine-Westphalian state parliament. In June 2017, he was appointed as State Secretary and Head of the State Chancellery of North Rhine-Westphalia in the Laschet cabinet.

Since 31 August 2017, Liminski is also responsible for the field of media politics in the state government, due to the problem of possible bias of the former WAZ-partner Stephan Holthoff-Pförtner, who was intended for this office, was discussed publicly. In this position, Liminski was sent to the ZDF television council in October 2017. The media magazine Kress pro placed him in 2020 behind EU Commissioner Margrethe Vestager in second place in the ranking of the 20 "most powerful pullers in the media".

Liminski was considered the irreplaceable "mastermind" and "right hand man" of Armin Laschet. He is seen as architect of both Laschet's election victory in the state elections in North Rhine-Westphalia in 2017 and the coalition agreement that was subsequently concluded between CDU and FDP. Liminski also arranged the ultimately successful candidacy of Laschet and the Federal Minister of Health Jens Spahn, with whom he has been friends since their time together in the Young Union, in the CDU chairmanship in 2020/21.

In the 2021 federal election campaign, the SPD used an election commercial that addressed Liminski’s arch-conservative positions. Those who vote for the CDU vote for "arch-Catholic Laschet confidants, for whom sex before marriage is taboo," it says. The spot was criticized because the religious affiliation of a politician was put in the foreground in a drastic way of 'negative campaigning'. It was expected that Liminski would become Head of Chancellery if Armin Laschet would have won the election. After Laschet moved to the Bundestag in Berlin, Liminski stayed in office as State Secretary in North Rhine-Westphalia in the First Wüst cabinet.

He ran as MP at the state elections in North Rhine-Westphalia in May 2022 in Cologne, but missed entering the state parliament. After the election, Liminski became Minister for Federal, European and International Affairs and Media in the Second Wüst cabinet, but also retained his post as Head of State Chancellery.

== Other activities ==
- Film- und Medienstiftung NRW, Member of the Supervisory Board

== Publications ==
- Liminski, Nathanael, ed. (2007). Generation Benedikt: Lebensfragen junger Menschen – Antworten im Geiste des Papstes [Generation Benedict: Life Questions of Young People - Answers in the Spirit of the Pope] (in German). With a prologue by Pope Benedict XVI. Gütersloh: Gütersloher Verlagshaus. ISBN 978-3-579-06453-6.
