= Josefine Paul =

German politician (born 1982)

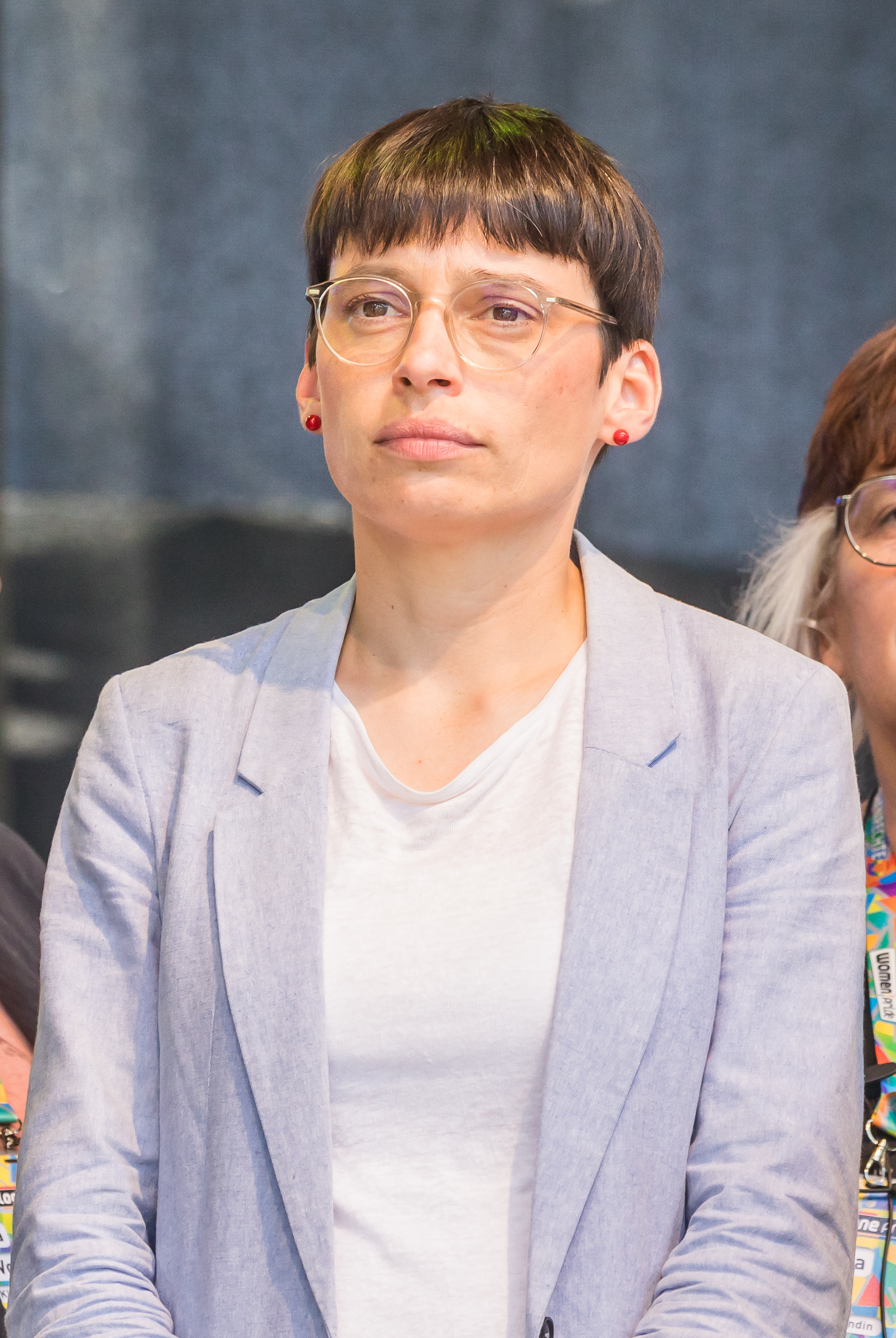
- Paul in 2022

North Rhine-Westphalia State Minister for Children, Youth, Family, Equality, Refugees and Integration
- Incumbent
- Assumed office 29 June 2022

Member of the Landtag of North Rhine-Westphalia
- In office 2010–2026

Personal details
- Born: 2 March 1982 (age 44) Helmstedt, West Germany
- Party: Greens
- Education: University of Münster

Josefine Paul (born 2 March 1982) is a German politician who is a member of Alliance 90/The Greens. She has been a member of the Landtag of North Rhine-Westphalia since 2010 and has been serving as North Rhine-Westphalia State Minister for Children, Youth, Family, Equality, Asylum and Integration in the Second Wüst cabinet from 2022 until 2026.

== Early life and education ==
Paul comes from the Helmstedt district of Barmke. In 2001 she passed her Abitur exams at the Gymnasium Julianum and then studied history, political science, and sociology until 2008, first at the Technical University of Braunschweig, then from 2005 at the University of Münster. Paul wrote her master's thesis on "The beginnings of soccer in Germany as a school game. A study using the example of the city of Braunschweig."

== Political career ==
=== Joining the Alliance 90/The Greens ===
Paul joined the Alliance 90/The Greens in 1999. During her studies in Münster, she was the coordinator of the specialist forum "LesBiSchwul" of the Green Youth.

=== Member of the Landtag ===
In the 2010, 2012, 2017 and 2022 state elections, Paul was elected to the Landtag of North Rhine-Westphalia via her party's state list. From 2010 to 2012 and from 2015 to 2020, she was deputy parliamentary group leader, from 2017 to 2020 at the same time parliamentary group secretary. On 26 October 2020, she was elected together with Verena Schäffer as the new group leader. In the 17th electoral term of the North Rhine-Westphalian state parliament (2017 to 2022) she was also spokeswoman for her parliamentary group for children, youth and family, spokeswoman for women's and queer politics and spokeswoman for sports politics.

In December 2018, Paul attracted media attention with statements about Knecht Ruprecht. She stated that "Ruprecht no longer fits into today's image of non-violent upbringing, so he can still help carry the sweets".

=== Minister for Children, Youth, Family, Equality, Refugees and Integration ===
On 29 June 2022, Paul was appointed Minister for Children, Youth, Family, Equality, Flight and Integration in the Second Wüst cabinet (black-green coalition) at the suggestion of Alliance 90/The Greens. She was sworn in before the state parliament on the same day. Paul declared on 27 January 2026 to give up the office. Pressure on her, regarding her conduct in the aftermath of the 2024 Solingen stabbing, had been rising in the days before she announced the decision. Verena Schäffer has been designated to become acting Minister.

== Personal life ==
Paul is openly lesbian and is in a relationship with Saxon Minister of Justice Katja Meier.
