= 2025 Bielefeld stabbing attack =

- Location: 52°1′39.19″N 8°31′43.19″E; Große-Kurfürsten-Straße 81, Bielefeld, North Rhine-Westphalia, Germany
- Date: 18 May 2025; 4:20 a.m. CEST (UTC+02:00)
- Attack type: Mass stabbing
- Weapon: Swordstick
- Deaths: 0
- Injuries: 6 (including the perpetrator)
- Motive: Islamic extremism
- Convictions: Attempted murder

On 18 May 2025, a mass stabbing took place at a bar in Bielefeld, North Rhine-Westphalia, Germany. Five men were injured before the perpetrator, a 35-year-old Syrian man, was arrested.

The perpetrator admitted to having Islamist motives in accordance with Islamic State ideology and was sentenced to life imprisonment in June 2026.

== Course of events ==
At around 4:20 a.m., a man mingled with Arminia Bielefeld football fans partying in front of the bar Cutie on Große-Kurfürsten-Straße, about an eight-minute walk from Bielefeld Hauptbahnhof. Shortly thereafter, he attacked several people using a cane with a retractable blade and a knife. He injured at least five people: four men aged 22 to 27 and a 26-year-old woman. Four of the victims suffered serious injuries, two of whom were temporarily in critical condition. Some guests attempted to overpower the attacker, who sustained minor facial injuries. This included a 26-year-old Arminia fan, who though already injured in the leg, threw himself at the attacker and suffered several life-threatening stab wounds to the chest. The police praised the Arminia fans for their courage and emphasized that without them there would have been deaths.

== Investigations ==
The perpetrator fled by train via Hamm to Essen. Near the crime scene, police found a bag containing residence papers, several knives, and a bottle of flammable liquid. Hours later, police were notified by a citizen that the wanted man had apparently asked him at Essen Central Station if he could use the Deutsche Bahn Navigator app on his cell phone to find a connection to Velbert. Investigators identified three properties there as possible locations. The next evening, the suspect was arrested in an empty apartment in the neighboring Heiligenhaus district. He resisted and sustained minor injuries. Due to suspicion of an Islamist-motivated attack, the Federal Prosecutor's Office took over the investigation. In addition to his unremarkable contacts with a mosque community in Bielefeld, he also had contact with individuals considered to be relevant Islamist figures. According to the Federal Prosecutor's Office, evidence has grown that he acted out of Islamist motivation. The suspect used a translation app to declare that he sympathized with the Islamic State (IS). Investigators found handwritten notes in Arabic in his room, indicating an intense engagement with a, Salafist interpretation of Islam. A hand-drawn note with a black banner, a flag used by Islamist groups such as Al-Qaeda and IS, was also found.

== Perpetrator ==
The perpetrator is a Syrian from Al-Raqqa. According to his passport, he was born on January 1, 1990. Der Spiegel reported that he told German authorities that he initially lived in Turkey for four years and then illegally entered Germany with a smuggler, mostly on foot, via Bulgaria, Serbia, Hungary, Slovakia, and the Czech Republic in August 2023, where he first applied for asylum. He was apparently not registered in the transit countries. He cited fear of hostilities and persecution by the Assad regime as the reason for his asylum application. In December 2023, he received subsidiary protection from the Federal Office for Migration and Refugees and a residence permit valid until February 2027. He was housed in a refugee shelter in Harsewinkel, about 30 kilometers from Bielefeld. He had no previous criminal record.

== Reactions ==
After the knife attack, Federal Justice Minister Stefanie Hubig (SPD) stated that evidence of an Islamist motive had grown. In this context, she pointed out that Islamic terrorism is one of the greatest threats to Germany. The attack caused uncertainty among Bielefeld residents and raised concerns about an increase in knife attacks. Supporters of the football club Arminia Bielefeld honored an injured fan, who allegedly confronted the perpetrator, with a graffiti.

At the request of the Alternative for Germany parliamentary group in the German Bundestag, a debate on internal security and knife attacks in Germany took place on May 21, 2025. The AfD parliamentary group's deputy domestic policy spokesperson, Martin Hess, spoke of exploding knife crime in Germany. The figures, he argued, showed that knife crime was a "predominantly imported crime." There was strong opposition from the other parliamentary groups. Clara Bünger of the Left Party, for example, called it "repulsive" how the AfD was exploiting the current case in Bielefeld to incite hatred against migrants. On the same day, at the request of Bielefeld SPD MP Christina Kampmann, a Question Time on the attack was held in the Landtag of North Rhine-Westphalia. Interior Minister Herbert Reul (CDU) spoke of a "brilliant achievement by the police" in having caught the suspected perpetrator so quickly. The Minister for Refugees and Integration, Josefine Paul, announced that, according to the current status of the investigation, the suspected attacker had eight aliases. Three of them were known to the Federal Office for Migration and Refugees.

On May 24, 2025, three demonstrations were held in Bielefeld. According to police, a private individual registered a gathering of approximately 200 people at the main train station under the slogan "Sympathy for the Victims" and "Remigration." Shortly thereafter, an "Alliance Against the Right" registered a vigil at the scene of the crime, the Cutie Bar. In addition, left-wing groups called for a counter-demonstration at the main train station and for active resistance against the right-wing demonstration. Only about 40 people showed up for the right-wing extremist demonstration, which was organized by right-wing extremist activist Daniel Kokott. Around 300 people participated in the counter-demonstration. Around 15 people attempted to actively disrupt the right-wing gathering, which led to verbal altercations and minor physical altercations. When pyrotechnics were detonated in the direction of the emergency services and the right-wing demonstration, the police used pepper spray.

== See also ==
- Immigration and crime in Germany
