= Verena Schäffer =

German politician

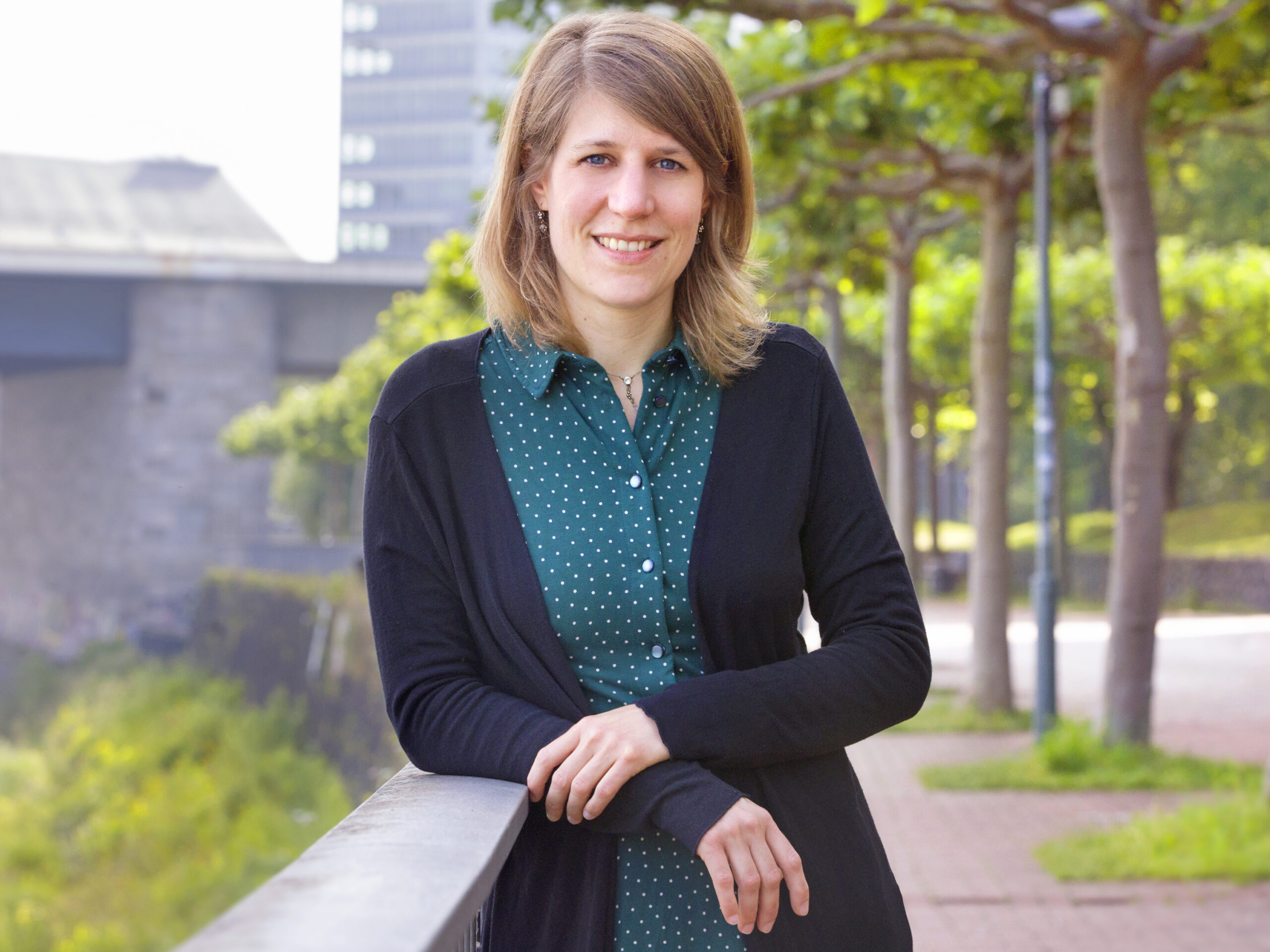
- Verena Schäffer in 2021

Member of the Landtag of North Rhine-Westphalia
- Incumbent
- Assumed office 2010

Personal details
- Born: 22 November 1986 (age 39) Frankfurt am Main, Germany
- Party: Alliance 90/The Greens

Verena Schäffer (born 22 November 1986) is a German politician for the Alliance 90/The Greens party. She has been a member of the Landtag of North Rhine-Westphalia since 2010. Since October 2020, she has been chairwoman of the Alliance 90/The Greens parliamentary group, and since August 2022, together with Wibke Brems. On 28 January 2026 Schäffer became Minister for Children, Youth, Family, Equality, Asylum and Integration of North Rhine-Westphalia in the Second Wüst cabinet.

== Life ==
Verena Schäffer grew up in Witten from an early age and graduated from the Schiller-Gymnasium Witten in 2007. During her school years, she spent a year abroad in California. From 2007 to 2010, she studied history and Jewish studies at the Heinrich Heine University in Düsseldorf, graduating with a bachelor degree . Since 2012, she has been enrolled in the Master's degree in European Modernism: History and Literature at the Fernuni Hagen.

Schäffer has two children, a son and a daughter.

== Political career ==
In 2004, Schäffer joined the Green Youth and the Green Party, and founded the local branch of the Young Greens in Witten. In November 2005, she was elected to the state executive committee of the Green Youth NRW, where she served as the state executive committee spokesperson from November 2006 to May 2010. In the local elections on 30 August 2009, she was elected to the Witten City Council and the Ennepe-Ruhr-Kreis Council. She resigned from the district council after the state election in May 2010.

In the state elections of 2010, 2012, 2017 und 2022, she ran as a direct candidate in the constituency of Ennepe-Ruhr-Kreis II and received 15.6% (2010), 15.8% (2012), 8.8% (2017) and 22.0% (2022) of the first votes. In each case, she entered the state parliament via the Green Party's state list. In the 15th legislative period, she was the youngest member of the state parliament. From August 2012 to May 2017, she was deputy chairwoman, and from May 2017 to October 2020, parliamentary secretary of the parliamentary group.

On 26 October 2020, she was elected, together with Josefine Paul, as the new parliamentary group leader of the Green Party in the state parliament. Her focus in the parliamentary group is on domestic policy and right-wing extremism. She is a full member of the Committee on Internal Affairs, the Subcommittee on Personnel, the Budget and Finance Committee, the Committee on Women, Equality and Emancipation, and the Control Committee pursuant to Section 23 of the North Rhine-Westphalia Constitutional Protection Act. She is also the spokesperson for the State Parliament's Committee on Internal Affairs.

In January 2026 Josefine Paul resigned as Minister for Children, Youth, Family, Equality, Asylum and Integration of North Rhine-Westphalia and on 27 January Verena Schäffer was designated by Minister-President Hendrik Wüst to replace her. She took the oath of office on 28 January 2026.

== Literature ==
- Landtag intern, Porträt: Verena Schäffer (Grüne), Ausgabe 11 vom 18. Dezember 2018, S. 23
- Landtag intern, Porträt: Verena Schäffer (Grüne), Ausgabe 5 vom 29. August 2023, S. 23

== See also ==
- List of members of the Landtag of North Rhine-Westphalia 2017–2022
