= Gonca Türkeli-Dehnert =

German lawyer and civil servant

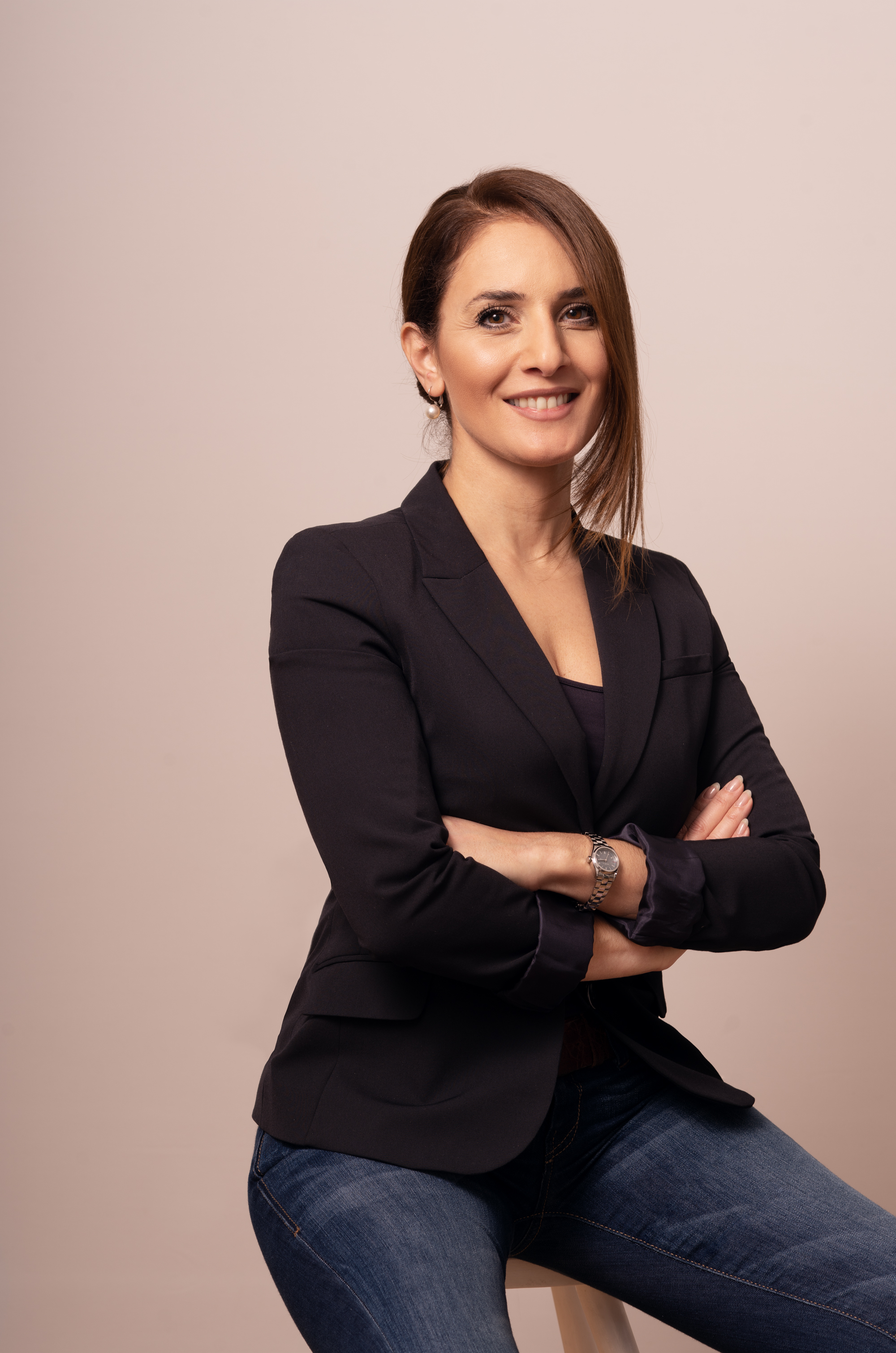
Gonca Türkeli-Dehnert in 2022

Gonca Türkeli-Dehnert (born 3 December 1975 in Berlin) is a German administrative lawyer and government official in North Rhine-Westphalia.

== Early life and education ==
After graduating from the Französisches Gymnasium Berlin, she studied law at the Free University of Berlin. From 2003 to 2005, before passing her higher legal examination, she worked at the Kammergericht in Berlin.

== Career ==
Türkeli-Dehnert began her career in the office of the Federal Secretary for Migration, Refugees and Integration (Die Beauftragte der Bundesregierung für Migration, Flüchtlinge und Integration) within the German Chancellery, initially as a member of the legal team and then in the prevention of extremism, and from February 2018 as business manager of the Deutschlandstiftung Integration. In October 2021, she became State Secretary for Integration in North Rhine-Westphalia in the First Wüst cabinet, replacing Serap Güler, who was elected to the Bundestag.

After the 2022 North Rhine-Westphalia state election, she became the State Secretary in the Ministry of Culture and Science in the Second Wüst cabinet.

== Personal life ==
Türkeli-Dehnert is divorced and has one child. She is a member of the Christian Democratic Union.
