= Jérémie Louis-Sidney =

French rapper and Islamist militant

Jérémie Louis-Sidney (Melun, 24 January 1979 — Strasbourg, 6 October 2012) was a French rapper and Islamist militant.

== Biography ==
The only son of seven siblings, Louis-Sidney suffered from a difficulties at school and quickly fell in juvenile delinquency, leading to his placement in a foster care family, and later in a semi-closed establishment. He escaped the facility at the age of 17 and converted to Islam around this point. He moved to Cannes, where he made a living from odd jobs. On 6 September 2007, he was arrested on suspicions of drug dealing. After a six-month detention, he was sentenced on 16 April 2008 to a one-year prison term and another year in suspended sentence, walking free under a reprieve deal.

In May 2009, Louis-Sidney published a rap song comprising vague conspiracy theories on the 11 of September attacks, child trafficking, organ trafficking, bar codes and media manipulation. Around the same time, police reported that Louis-Sidney met regularly with a group of associates who would end up being suspected in terrorist affairs. Religiously married to two women, Louis-Sidney lived in the Esplanade neighbourhood of Strasbourg.

Louis-Sidney came to the attention of the Central Directorate of Interior Intelligence in spring 2012. He became the main suspect in the 19 September fragmentation grenade attack against a kosher shop at Sarcelles, in which one person was lightly wounded, when his DNA signature was found on the lever of the weapon.

On 6 October 2012, the French police anti-terrorist unit RAID launched a France-wide arrest against the various elements of Louis-Sidney's group, known as the "Cannes-Torcy cell". At 6 in the morning, they broke in his Strasbourg apartment; Louis-Sidney turned out to be armed with a 357-calibre Smith & Wesson revolver and opened fire, wounding one of the officers in the thorax. Louis-Sidney was killed by the return fire of the police after firing all six shots in his weapon.

The police reported finding a testament tape where Louis-Sidney claimed to wish to "die a martyr". Paris prosecutor François Molins cited Louis-Sidney as an example of "rapid radicalisation".

== Notes, citations, and references ==
=== References ===
- Thomson, David (2014). Les Français jihadistes. pp. 95–96. ISBN 978-2352043270.
