= Mona Neubaur =

German politician (born 1977)

Mona Neubaur MdL MdBR
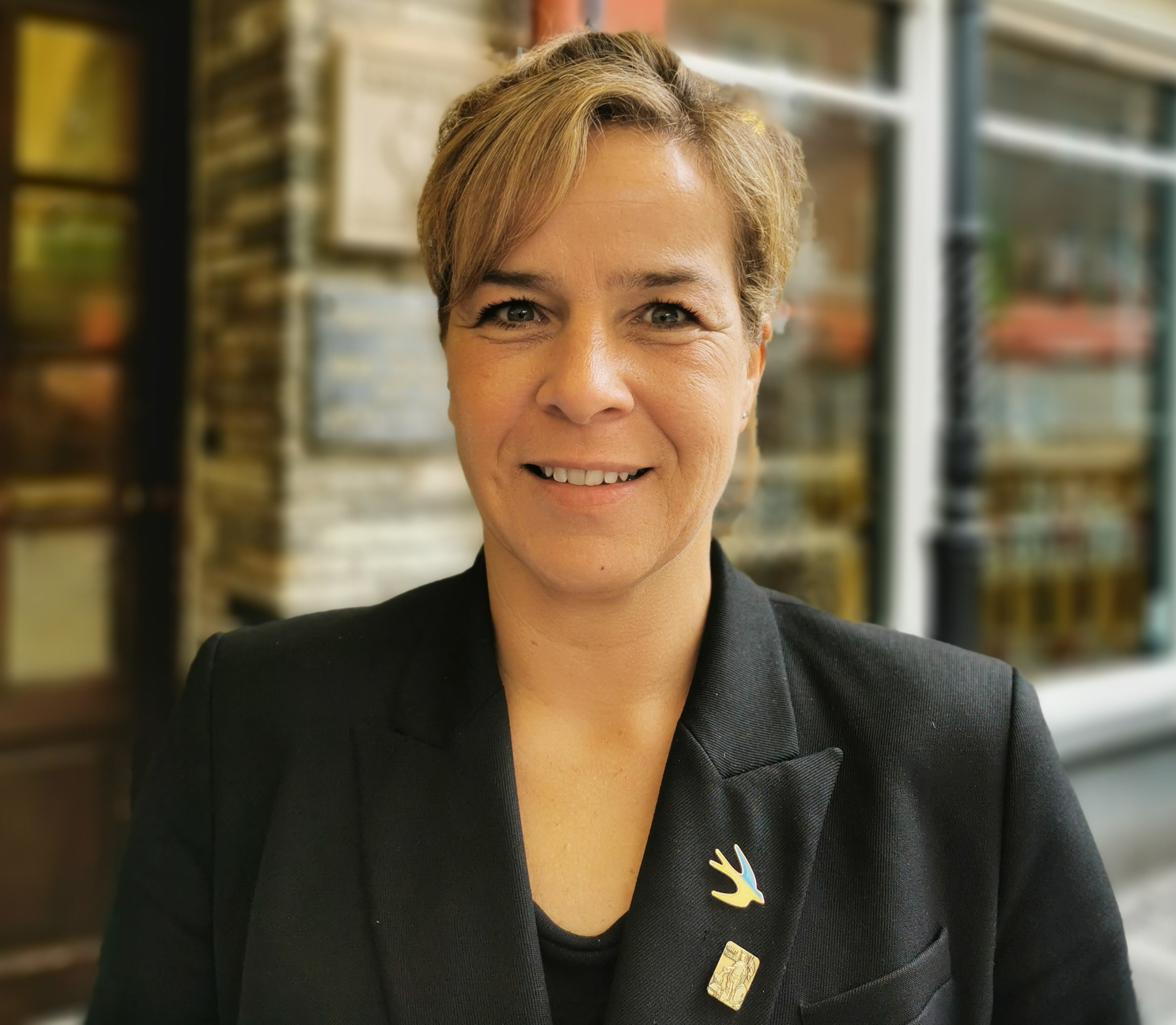
- Neubaur in 2026

Deputy Minister-President of North Rhine-Westphalia
- Incumbent
- Assumed office 29 June 2022
- Preceded by: Joachim Stamp

Minister for Economics, Industry, Climate Protection and Energy of North Rhine-Westphalia
- Incumbent
- Assumed office 29 June 2022
- Preceded by: Andreas Pinkwart

Member of the Landtag of North Rhine-Westphalia for Düsseldorf I
- Incumbent
- Assumed office 1 June 2022

Personal details
- Born: 1 July 1977 (age 49) Pöttmes, Bavaria, West Germany (now Germany)
- Party: Greens (since 1999)
- Education: University of Düsseldorf

Mona Neubaur (born 1 July 1977) is a German politician from Alliance 90/The Greens who has been serving as Deputy Minister-President of North Rhine-Westphalia and also as State Minister for Economics, Industry, Climate Protection and Energy in the second cabinet of Minister-President Hendrik Wüst since 29 June 2022. She was previously the leader of her party in North Rhine-Westphalia.

== Early life and career ==
Born to a nurse, Neubaur grew up in Pöttmes. In 1997 she moved to Düsseldorf to study education, sociology and psychology.

From 2007 to 2014, Neubaur worked for the Heinrich Böll Foundation in Düsseldorf.

== Political career ==
Neubau joined the Green Party in 1999. From 2007 to 2015, she served as chairwoman of the Green Party in Düsseldorf.

From 2014 to 2022, Neubaur served as co-chair of the Green Party in North Rhine-Westphalia, alongside Sven Lehmann (2014–2018) and Felix Banaszak (2018–2022).

Neubaur was nominated by her party as delegate to the Federal Convention for the purpose of electing the President of Germany in 2022.

== Other activities ==
=== Corporate boards ===
- NRW.BANK, Ex-Officio member of the supervisory board (since 2022)

=== Non-profit organizations ===
- Heinrich Böll Foundation, Member of the General Assembly
- Fortuna Düsseldorf, Member

== Political positions ==
Ahead of the presidential election on 13 February 2022, Bündnis 90/Die Grünen NRW (including Neubaur) publicly endorsed incumbent Frank-Walter Steinmeier (SPD).
