= Second Wüst cabinet =

State government of North Rhine-Westphalia

Second Cabinet of Hendrik Wüst Cabinet Wüst II
- 26th Cabinet of North Rhine-Westphalia
- 29 June 2022 –
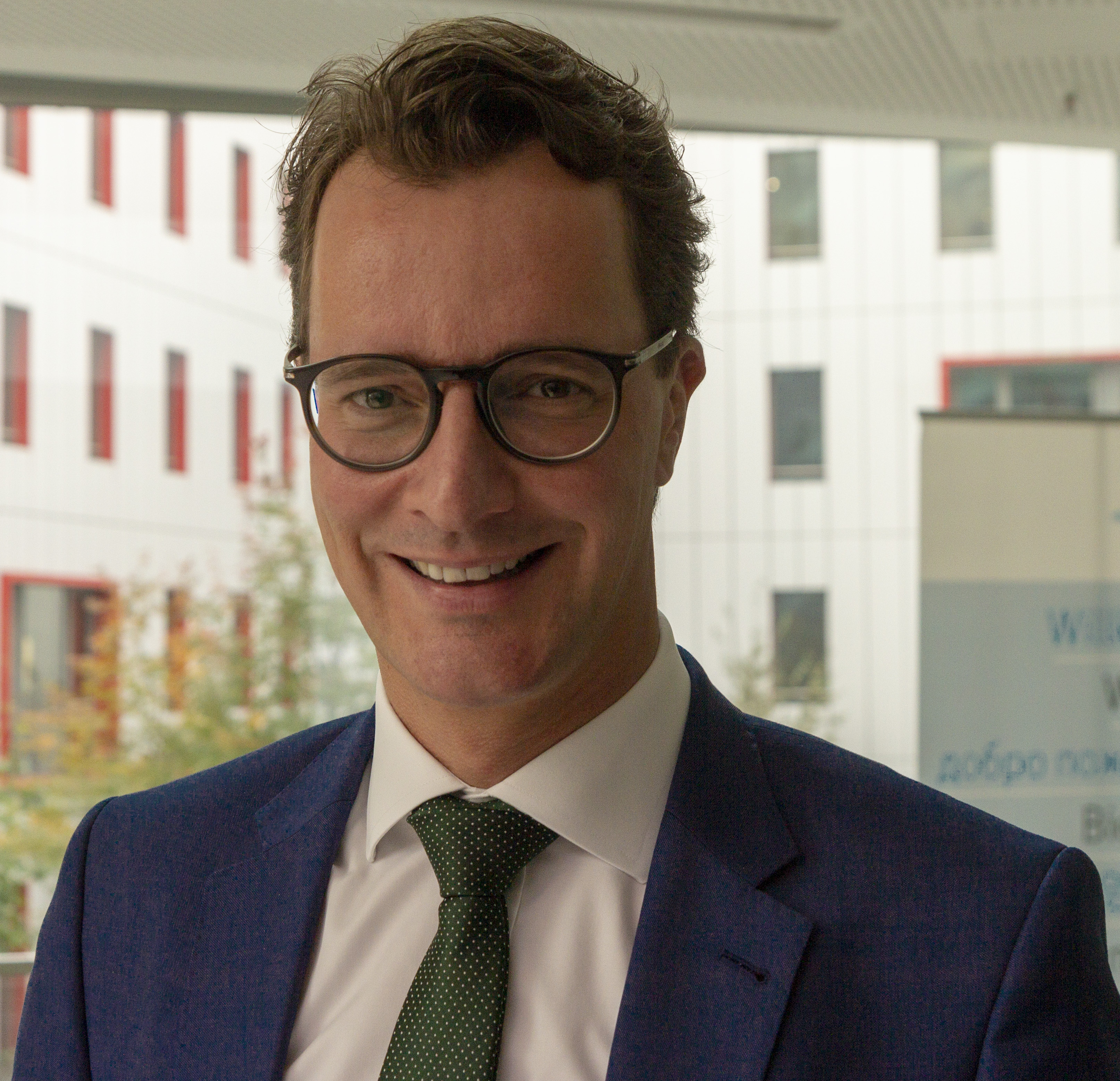
- Hendrik Wüst at the Conference of Transport Ministers in Frankfurt am Main in October 2019
- Date formed: 29 June 2022

People and organisations
- Minister-President: Hendrik Wüst
- Deputy Minister-President: Mona Neubaur
- No. of ministers: 12
- Member parties: Christian Democratic Union; Alliance 90/The Greens
- Status in legislature: Coalition government (Majority)
- Opposition parties: Social Democratic Party; Free Democratic Party; Alternative for Germany

History
- Election: 2022 North Rhine-Westphalia state election
- Legislature term: 18th Landtag of North Rhine-Westphalia
- Predecessor: First Wüst cabinet

The second Wüst cabinet is the current state government of North Rhine-Westphalia, sworn in on 29 June 2022 after Hendrik Wüst was elected as Minister-President of North Rhine-Westphalia by the members of the Landtag of North Rhine-Westphalia. It is the 26th Cabinet of North Rhine-Westphalia.

It was formed after the 2022 North Rhine-Westphalia state election by the Christian Democratic Union (CDU) and Alliance 90/The Greens (GRÜNE). Excluding the Minister-President, the cabinet comprises twelve ministers. Eight are members of the CDU and four are members of the Greens.

== Formation ==
The previous cabinet was a coalition government of the CDU and Free Democratic Party (FDP) led by Minister-President Hendrik Wüst of the CDU, who took office in October 2021.

The election took place on 15 May 2022, and resulted in small gains for the CDU and major losses for the FDP. The opposition Social Democratic Party (SPD) recorded a decline, while the Greens almost tripled their vote share to 18% and moved into third place. Overall, the incumbent coalition lost its majority.

After the election, the CDU and SPD both held exploratory discussions with the Greens, who held the balance of power and could form a government with either the CDU or the SPD and FDP. However, the FDP refused talks in the belief that a CDU–Green government was a foregone conclusion. With no other options available, the Greens voted to initiate coalition talks with the CDU, who reciprocated on 29 May. Negotiations began on 31 May.

The CDU and Greens presented their coalition agreement on 23 June. It was approved near-unanimously by a CDU conference on 25 June. The same day, it passed the Greens congress with 85%. There were objections from members who criticised the proposed separation of the agriculture portfolio from the environment ministry, as well as the state Green Youth, who rejected the prospect of coalition with the CDU outright on the basis that it could not sufficiently address pressing issues such as climate change, affordability, and rent and housing.

Wüst was elected as Minister-President by the Landtag on 28 June, winning 106 votes out of 180 cast. His new cabinet was sworn in the next day.

== Composition ==
Portfolio	Minister	Party	Took office	Left office	State secretaries	Party
Minister-President	Hendrik Wüst born 19 June 1975 (age 51)	CDU	28 June 2022	Incumbent	Bernd Schulte (head of office); Andrea Milz (Sports and Volunteering)	CDU
Deputy Minister-President Minister for Economics, Industry, Climate Protection and Energy	Mona Neubaur born 1 July 1977 (age 49)	GRÜNE	29 June 2022	Incumbent	Paul Höller; Silke Krebs	GRÜNE
Minister for Finance	Marcus Optendrenk born 21 July 1969 (age 57)	CDU	29 June 2022	Incumbent	Dirk Günnewig	CDU
Minister for Interior	Herbert Reul born 31 August 1952 (age 74)	CDU	29 June 2022	Incumbent	Daniela Lesmeister	CDU
Minister for Children, Youth, Family, Equality, Asylum and Integration	Verena Schäffer born 22 November 1986 (age 39)	GRÜNE	28 January 2026	Incumbent	Lorenz Bahr	CDU
Minister for Labour, Health and Social Affairs	Karl-Josef Laumann born 11 July 1957 (age 69)	CDU	29 June 2022	Incumbent	Matthias Heidmeier	GRÜNE
Minister for School and Education	Dorothee Feller born 6 May 1966 (age 60)	CDU	29 June 2022	Incumbent	Urban Mauer	CDU
Minister for Homeland, Communities, Construction and Digitalisation	Ina Scharrenbach born 30 September 1976 (age 50)	CDU	29 June 2022	Incumbent	Josef Hovenjürgen; Daniel Sieveke	GRÜNE
Minister for Justice	Benjamin Limbach born 1970 (age 55–56)	GRÜNE	29 June 2022	Incumbent	Daniela Brückner	CDU
Minister for Environment, Nature Protection, and Transport	Oliver Krischer born 26 July 1969 (age 57)	GRÜNE	29 June 2022	Incumbent	Viktor Haase	GRÜNE
Minister for Agriculture and Consumer Protection	Silke Gorißen born 15 December 1971 (age 54)	CDU	29 June 2022	Incumbent	Martin Berges	CDU
Minister for Culture and Science	Ina Brandes born 1977 (age 48–49)	CDU	29 June 2022	Incumbent	Gonca Türkeli-Dehnert	CDU
Minister for Federal, European and International Affairs Chief of the State Chancellery	Nathanael Liminski born 19 September 1985 (age 41)	CDU	29 June 2022	Incumbent	Mark Speich (Federal, European and International Affairs); Bernd Schulte (Office of the State Chancellery); Andrea Milz (Sport and Volunteering)	CDU
