= Cannes-Torcy cell =

Jihadist network in France

The "Cannes-Torcy cell" was a jihadist network in France uncovered in 2012. Eighteen members of the cell were sentenced from one to 28 years in prison in 2017.

== Jewish grocery store attack ==
Two members of the cell were first arrested after a grenade attack against a Jewish grocery store in Sarcelles in September 2012 that injured one person. Police later found bomb-making equipment in a storage unit rented by Jeremie Bailly, the alleged leader of the group. Another of the suspects, Muslim convert Jérémie Louis-Sidney, was killed in a police shootout on 6 October 2012 while resisting arrest. Three days after the shootout, police found "bags of potassium nitrate, sulfur, saltpeter, headlight bulbs and a pressure cooker" belonging to Louis-Sidney in an underground car park in Torcy, a suburb east of Paris.

According to French officials, two other alleged members of the cell, French-Algerian Ibrahim Boudina and French-Tunisian Abdelkader Tliba, were found to have set off for Syria just days after the attack. According to the officials, after first having joined the Al-Nusra Front, they later joined the Islamic State of Iraq and the Levant (ISIL). Having returned from Syria, Boudina was arrested on 11 February 2014 in Mandelieu-la-Napoule near Cannes. Police thereafter found "a handgun, bomb-making instructions, and three soda cans filled with the high-explosive compound TATP" in a storage closet belonging to Boudina.

== Trial ==
Twenty members of the network were tried by a special anti-terror tribunal in Paris in 2017. Of the twenty, ten were in prison, seven on conditional release, and three others at large, with two thought to be in Syria. The cell was accused of plotting attacks against both military and civilian targets, and of seeking to join jihadists in Syria. During the trial, the cell was described as "the missing link" between Mohammed Merah, the perpetrator of the March 2012 Toulouse and Montauban shootings, and the Brussels ISIL terror cell responsible for the November 2015 Paris attacks.

The court noted the diverse backgrounds of the twenty accusees, some being from affluent families and originating in Algeria, Laos and France.

In June 2017, eighteen members of the cell were sentenced from one to 28 years in prison, while two were acquitted. The longest sentence was given to Jeremy Bailly, who was found guilty of throwing the grenade against the Jewish grocery store. The driver of the grenade attack received an 18-year prison sentence. Some others were convicted for assisting in the attack, while others were convicted for travelling to join jihadists in Syria. Among the latter was Ibrahim Boudina, who was also accused of "returning to commit an attack" on the Cote d'Azur. Abdelkader Tliba was tried in absentia, as he was still thought to be in Syria and to "have risen within the ranks of the Islamic State group."

Seven of the convicted had connections to the Torcy mosque which was closed on 11 April 2017 for inciting jihadism.
