= Markus Wagner =

German politician

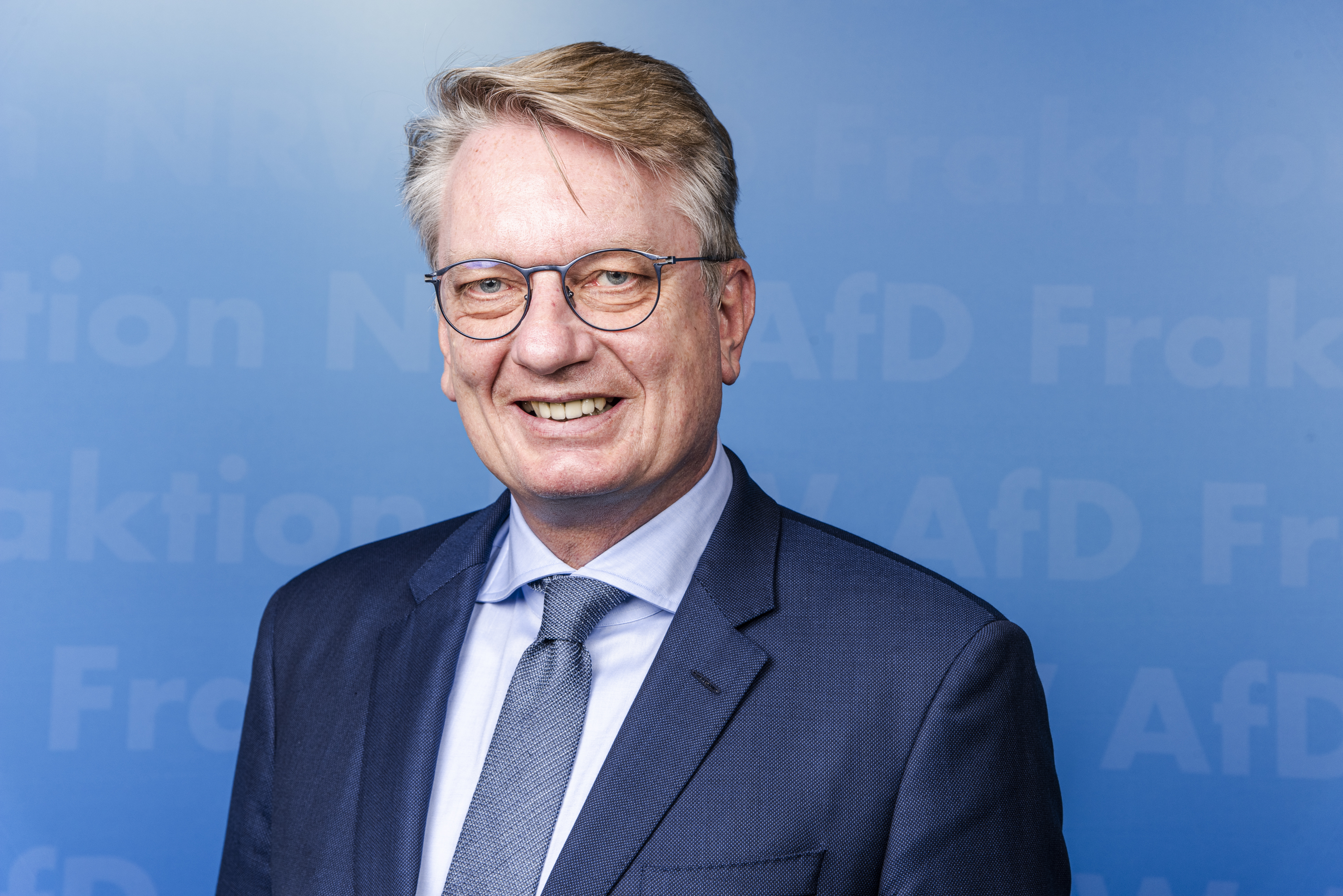
Markus Wagner in 2021.

Markus Wagner (born 12 June 1964 in Unkel) is a German politician from the Alternative for Germany party. He has been leader of his group in the Landtag of North Rhine-Westphalia since 2017.

== Personal life ==
He and his wife have an adopted son from Haiti.
