= Silke Gorißen =

German politician (born 1971)

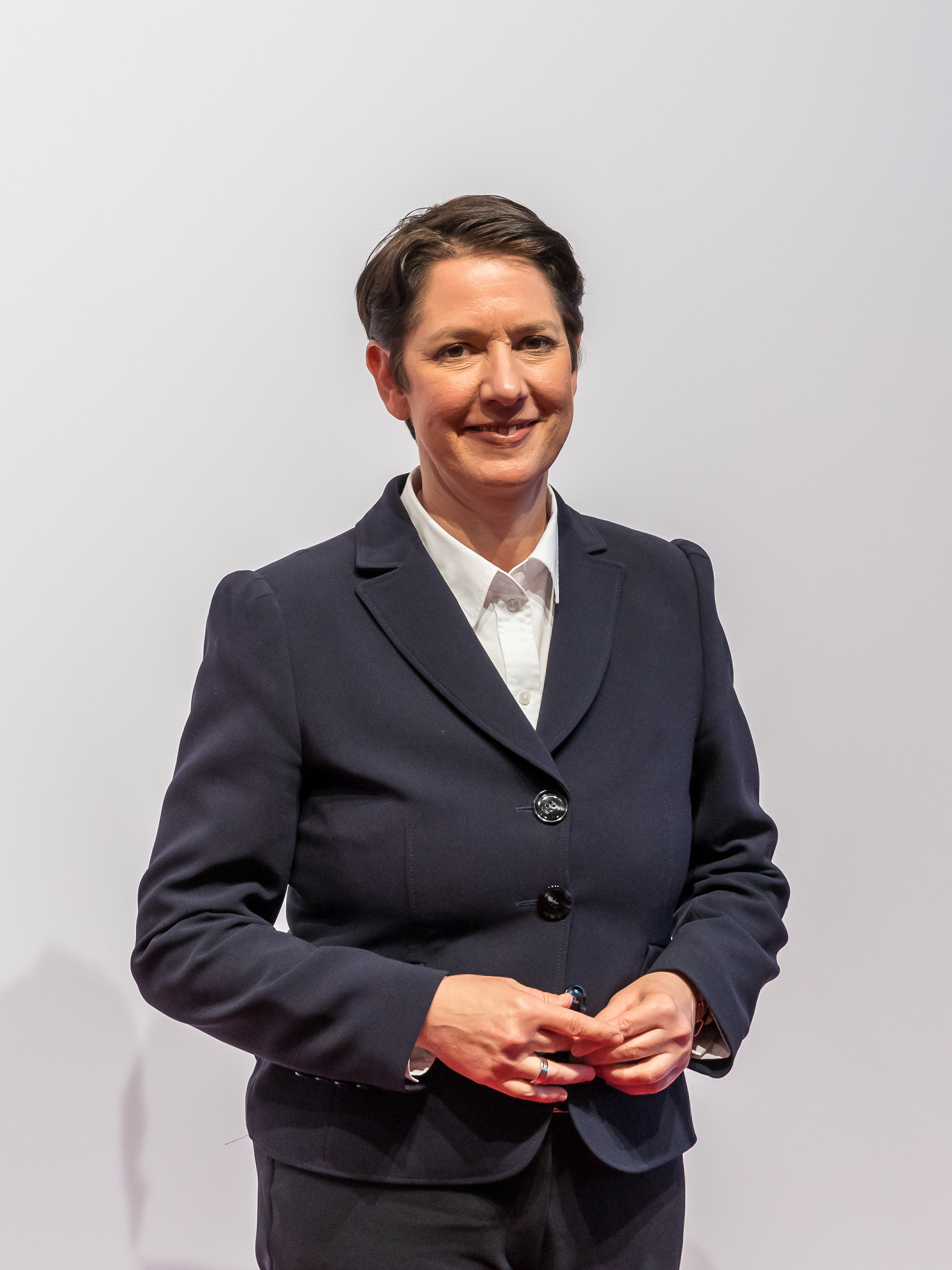
- Gorißen in 2023

Minister of Agriculture and Consumer Protection of North Rhine-Westphalia
- Incumbent
- Assumed office 29 June 2022
- Minister-President: Hendrik Wüst
- Preceded by: Lutz Lienenkämper (acting)

Personal details
- Born: 15 December 1971 (age 54) Kleve
- Party: Christian Democratic Union (since 1990)

Silke Gorißen (born 15 December 1971 in Kleve) is a German politician serving as minister of agriculture and consumer protection of North Rhine-Westphalia since 2022. From 2020 to 2022, she served as Landrat of Kleve.
