= 2022 North Rhine-Westphalia state election =

German state election

- 15 May 2022

All 195 seats in the Landtag of North Rhine-Westphalia 98 seats needed for a majority
- Turnout: 7,201,210 (55.5% ▼9.6 pp)
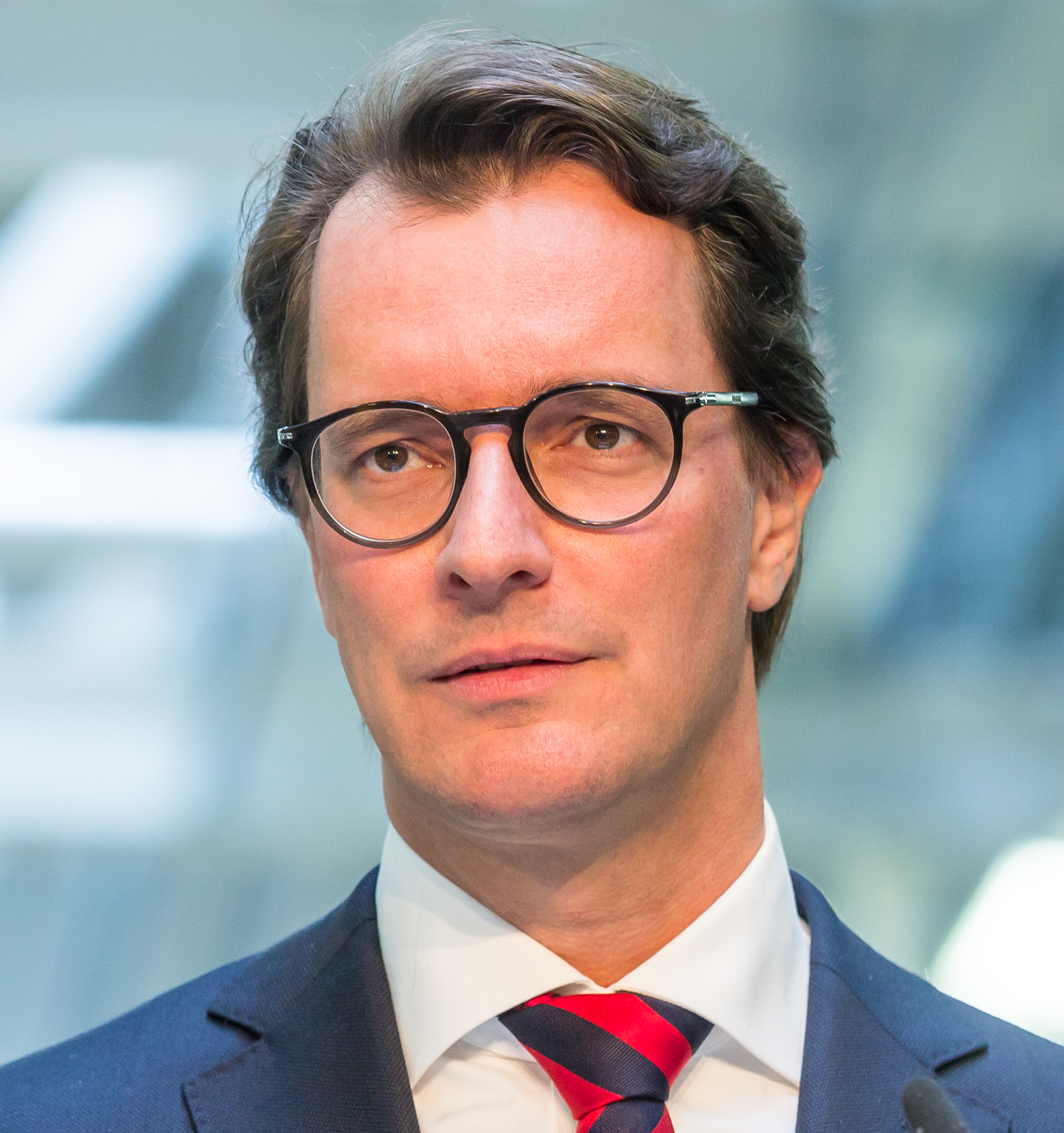

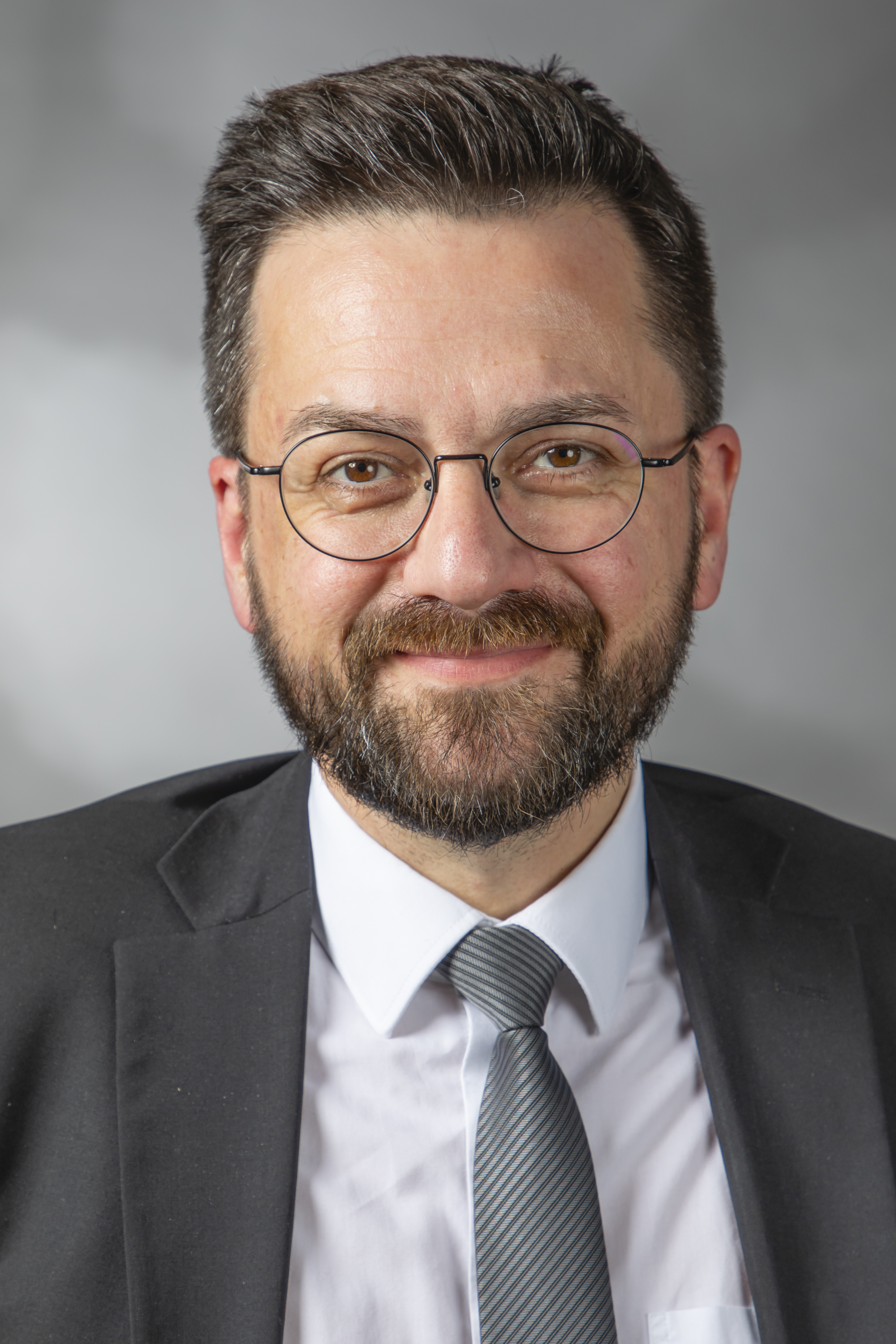

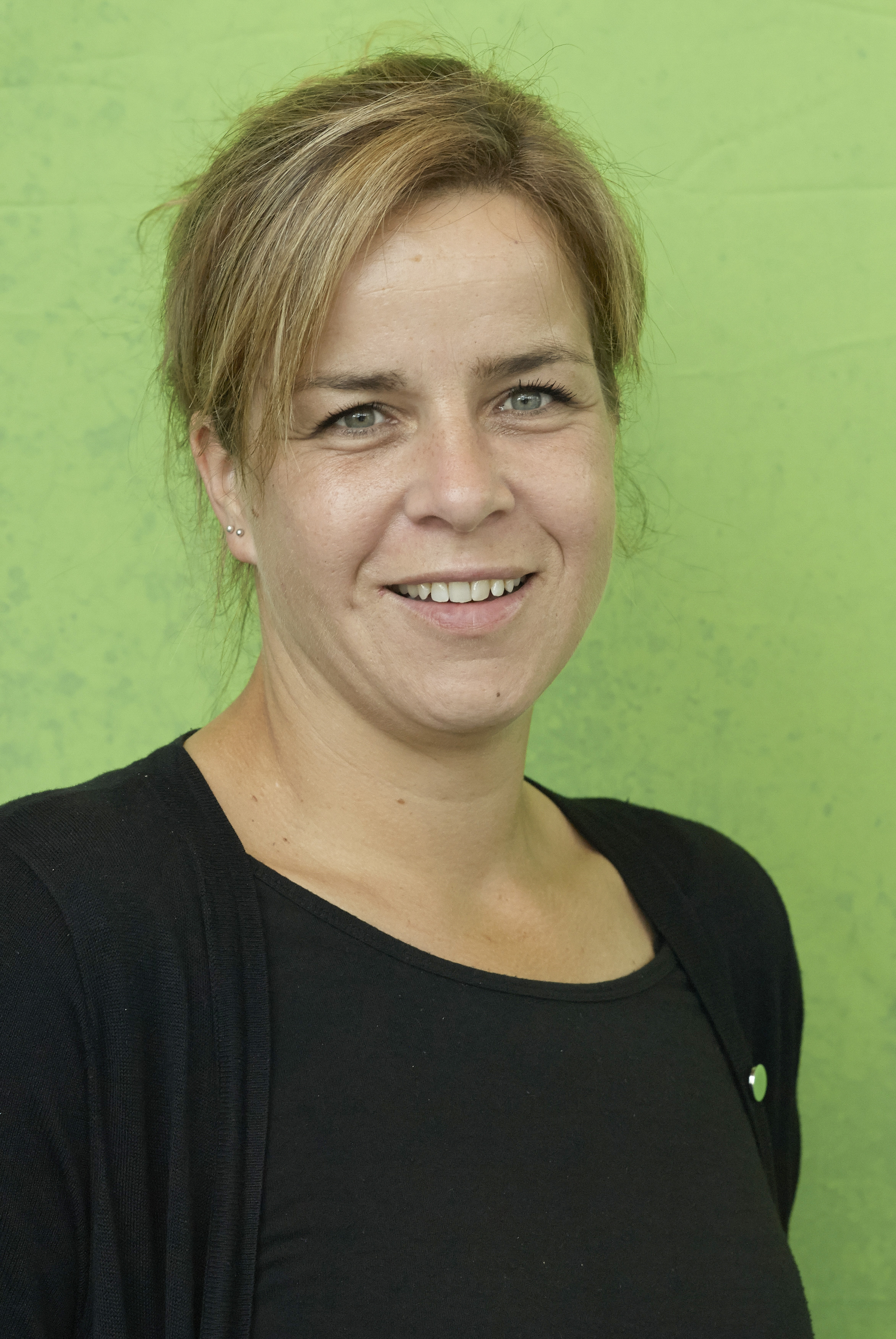

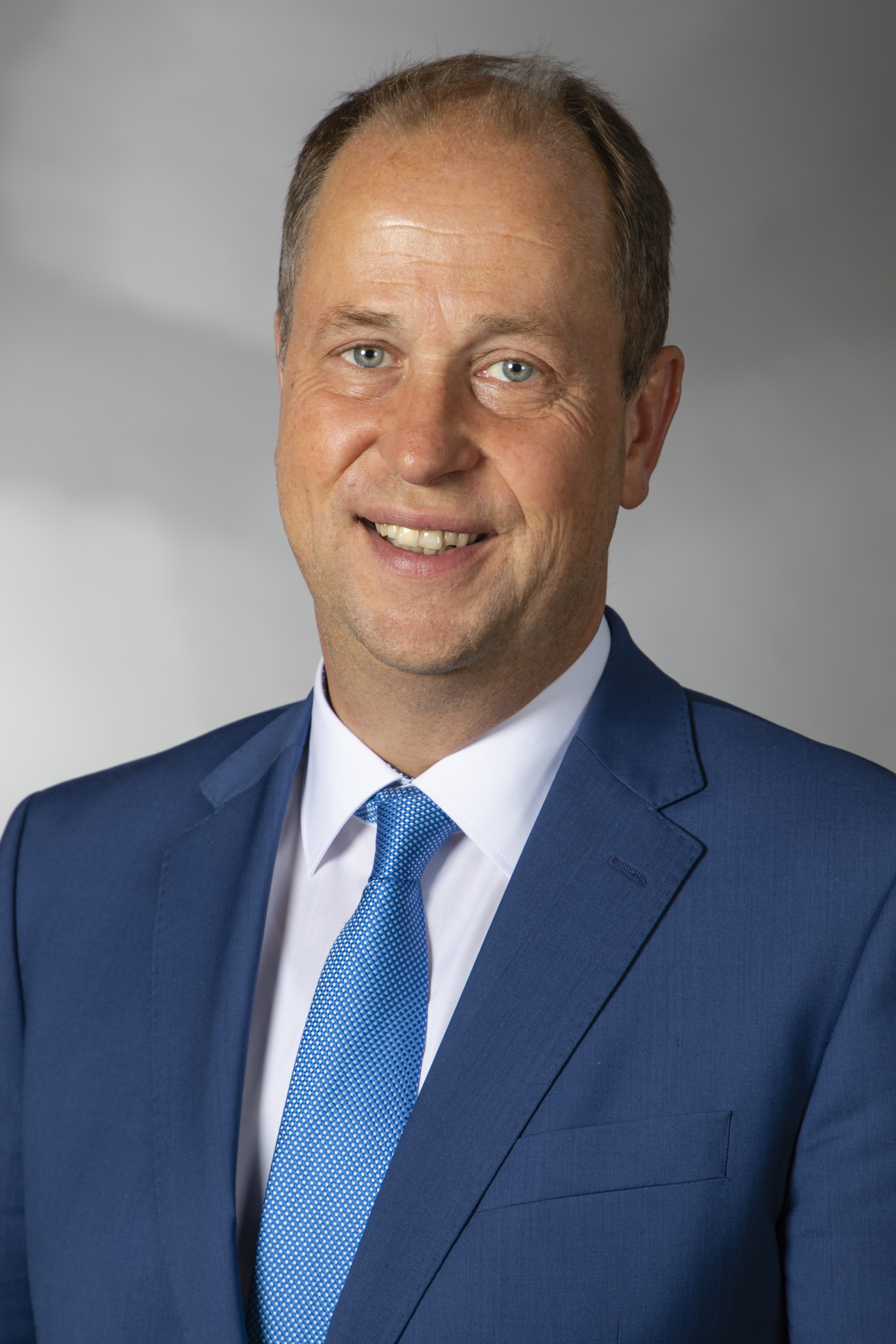

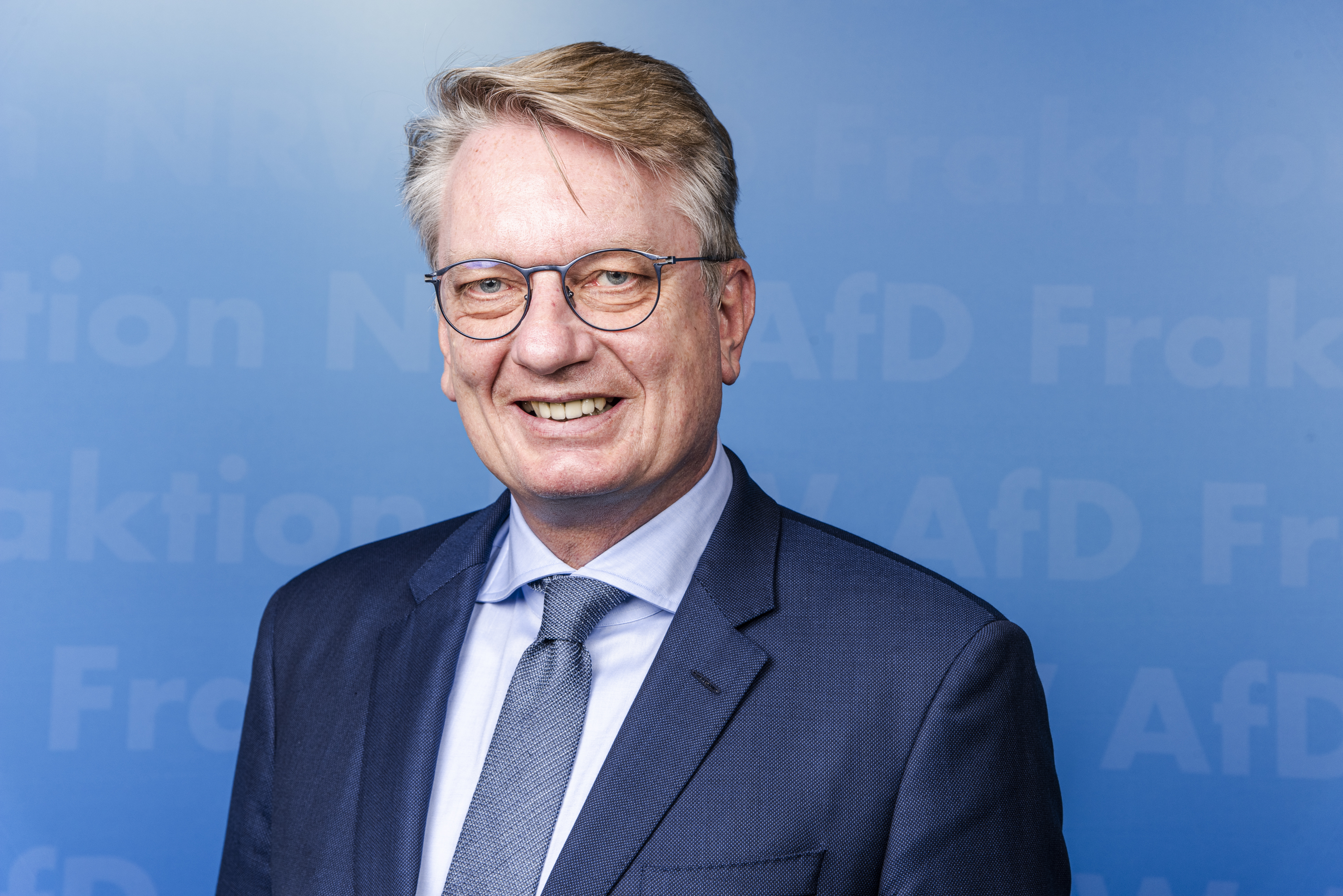
	First party	Second party	Third party
Candidate	Hendrik Wüst	Thomas Kutschaty	Mona Neubaur
Party	CDU	SPD	Greens
Last election	72 seats, 33.0%	69 seats, 31.2%	14 seats, 6.4%
Seats won	76	56	39
Seat change	▲4	▼13	▲25
Popular vote	2,552,276	1,905,002	1,299,821
Percentage	35.7%	26.7%	18.2%
Swing	▲2.8 pp	▼4.6 pp	▲11.8 pp
	Fourth party	Fifth party
Candidate	Joachim Stamp	Markus Wagner
Party	FDP	AfD
Last election	28 seats, 12.6%	16 seats, 7.4%
Seats won	12	12
Seat change	▼16	▼4
Popular vote	418,460	388,768
Percentage	5.9%	5.4%
Swing	▼6.7 pp	▼1.9 pp
- Map of the election, showing the winner of each single-member district and the distribution of list seats.
Government before election
First Wüst cabinet
CDU–FDP
Government after election
Second Wüst cabinet
CDU-Green

The 2022 North Rhine-Westphalia state election was held on 15 May 2022 to elect the 18th Landtag of North Rhine-Westphalia. The outgoing government (First Wüst cabinet) was a coalition of the Christian Democratic Union (CDU) and Free Democratic Party (FDP) led by Minister-President Hendrik Wüst.

The CDU remained the largest party with 36% of votes, a small increase from 2017, while the opposition Social Democratic Party (SPD) declined to 27%. The Greens almost tripled their vote share to 18%. The FDP fell sharply to 6%, and the Alternative for Germany (AfD) slipped to 5%. Overall, the incumbent coalition lost its majority, though the opposition SPD and Greens also fell short of victory.

After the election, CDU formed a coalition with the Greens. This was the first time the two parties had worked together on the state level in North Rhine-Westphalia. Hendrik Wüst was re-elected as Minister-President on 28 June, and his cabinet was sworn in the next day.

== Election date ==
The Landtag is elected for five years, with its term commencing when the new Landtag first meets. Elections must take place in the last three months of the legislative period.

== Electoral system ==
The Landtag is elected via mixed-member proportional representation. 128 members are elected in single-member constituencies via first-past-the-post voting. 53 members are then allocated using compensatory proportional representation. Voters have two votes: the "first vote" for candidates in single-member constituencies, and the "second vote" for party lists, which are used to fill the remaining seats in a way that achieves proportionality overall. The minimum size of the Landtag is 181 members, but if overhang seats are present, proportional leveling seats will be added to ensure proportionality. An electoral threshold of 5% of valid votes is applied to the Landtag; parties that fall below this threshold are ineligible to receive seats.

== Background ==
In the previous election held on 14 May 2017, the CDU became the largest party with 33.0% of votes cast, an increase of seven percentage points. The SPD lost eight points and placed second with 31.2% of votes. The FDP won 12.6% (+4.0 pp), and the Greens fell to 6.4% (–4.9 pp). The AfD contested its first election in North Rhine-Westphalia, winning 7.4%. Other parties were not able to enter parliament, The Left only closely missing the electoral threshold of 5% winning 4.9% (+2.4 pp).

The SPD had led a coalition with the Greens since 2010 (→ cabinets Kraft I und Kraft II), but this government lost its majority in the election. The CDU subsequently formed a coalition with the FDP, and Armin Laschet became Minister-President (→ Cabinet Laschet).

After unsuccessfully leading the CDU/CSU in the 2021 German federal election, Laschet resigned as Minister-President. Hendrik Wüst was elected by the Landtag as his successor on 27 October 2021.

== Parties ==
The table below lists parties represented in the 17th Landtag of North Rhine-Westphalia.

Name		Ideology	Lead candidate(s)	Leader(s)	2017 result	
Name		Ideology	Lead candidate(s)	Leader(s)	Votes (%)	Seats
CDU	Christian Democratic Union of Germany; Christlich Demokratische Union Deutschlands	Christian democracy	Hendrik Wüst	Hendrik Wüst	33.0%	72 / 199
SPD	Social Democratic Party of Germany; Sozialdemokratische Partei Deutschlands	Social democracy	Thomas Kutschaty	Thomas Kutschaty	31.2%	69 / 199
FDP	Free Democratic Party; Freie Demokratische Partei	Classical liberalism	Joachim Stamp	Joachim Stamp	12.6%	28 / 199
AfD	Alternative for Germany; Alternative für Deutschland	Right-wing populism	Markus Wagner	Rüdiger Lucassen	7.4%	16 / 199
Grüne	Alliance 90/The Greens; Bündnis 90/Die Grünen	Green politics	Mona Neubaur	Felix Banaszak; Mona Neubaur	6.4%	14 / 199

== Opinion polling ==
=== Graphical summary ===
Local regression of polls conducted.

=== Party polling ===
Polling firm	Fieldwork date	Sample size	CDU	SPD	FDP	AfD	Grüne	Linke	Others	Lead
2022 state election	15 May 2022	–	35.7	26.7	5.9	5.4	18.2	2.1	6.1	9.0
Wahlkreisprognose	12–13 May 2022	1,652	33	28.5	6	6.5	16.5	3	6.5	4.5
Forschungsgruppe Wahlen	9–12 May 2022	2,254	32	29	6	7	17	3	6	3
YouGov	6–12 May 2022	1,046	31	28	10	7	15	4	5	3
INSA	9–10 May 2022	1,000	32	28	8	7	16	3	6	4
INSA	2–9 May 2022	1,000	31	29	8	7	16	3	6	2
Wahlkreisprognose	5–6 May 2022	2,127	30	29.5	9	7	16.5	2.5	5.5	0.5
Forschungsgruppe Wahlen	3–5 May 2022	1,026	30	28	7	7	18	3	7	2
Infratest dimap	2–4 May 2022	1,537	30	28	8	8	16	3	7	2
Wahlkreisprognose	1 May 2022	1,853	30.5	31	9	6	16.5	2.5	4.5	0.5
Forsa	19–26 Apr 2022	2,006	32	28	7	6	17	3	7	4
Wahlkreisprognose	20–22 Apr 2022	1,445	31	31.5	6.5	7.5	15	2.5	6	0.5
Infratest dimap	19–21 Apr 2022	1,164	31	30	8	7	16	3	5	1
INSA	11–13 Apr 2022	1,000	29	31	10	7	14	4	5	2
Forsa	4–11 Apr 2022	1,821	30	30	8	6	18	2	6	Tie
Wahlkreisprognose	8–9 Apr 2022	1,230	27.5	33	7.5	6	17.5	3	5.5	5.5
INSA	28 Mar–4 Apr 2022	1,000	28	30	10	7	15	4	6	2
Infratest dimap	29–31 Mar 2022	1,182	31	30	8	7	15	4	5	1
Wahlkreisprognose	11–13 Mar 2022	1,100	30.5	31	9.5	5	15.5	2.5	5.5	0.5
Forsa	2–9 Mar 2022	2,006	32	27	8	6	17	3	7	5
INSA	15–17 Feb 2022	1,000	27	29	12	8	14	4	6	2
Wahlkreisprognose	13–17 Feb 2022	1,874	29	30	10	8	13.5	4	5.5	1
Forsa	26 Jan–2 Feb 2022	2,006	29	27	9	7	18	4	6	2
INSA	24 Jan–2 Feb 2022	2,000	26	28	12	8	14	4	8	2
Infratest dimap	24–27 Jan 2022	1,160	28	28	10	8	17	3	6	Tie
Wahlkreisprognose	19–20 Jan 2022	1,230	30	27	11	9	13.5	4	5.5	3
Wahlkreisprognose	12–20 Dec 2021	1,210	29	28	12	7	15	3	6	1
Forsa	26 Nov–7 Dec 2021	2,009	27	27	12	7	17	4	6	Tie
Wahlkreisprognose	24–28 Nov 2021	1,400	25	28	13.5	8.5	16	4	5	3
Wahlkreisprognose	11–16 Nov 2021	1,004	27	29	12	7	16.5	3.5	5	2
Wahlkreisprognose	26–31 Oct 2021	1,009	27	30	14	5	16	3	5	3
Infratest dimap	18–21 Oct 2021	1,172	22	31	13	7	17	3	7	9
Wahlkreisprognose	16–19 Oct 2021	1,320	22	30	16	6	16.5	2.5	7	8
INSA	4–10 Oct 2021	1,000	20	33	15	8	13	4	7	13
2021 federal election	26 Sep 2021	–	26.0	29.1	11.4	7.3	16.1	3.7	6.5	3.1
Wahlkreisprognose	1–9 Aug 2021	–	25	24.5	12	9	20	4.5	5	0.5
Wahlkreisprognose	8–15 Jul 2021	–	30	23.5	11	8.5	18	4	5	6.5
Forsa	10–17 May 2021	1,058	25	19	12	7	26	4	7	1
INSA	3–10 May 2021	2,014	25	20	11	9	26	4.5	4.5	1
Infratest dimap	6–8 Apr 2021	1,197	28	18	11	8	26	3	6	2
Infratest dimap	25–28 Jan 2021	1,000	37	17	8	6	24	3	5	13
INSA	22–28 Oct 2020	1,008	33	23	8	8	19	5	4	10
Infratest dimap	24–29 Aug 2020	1,002	34	21	7	7	22	4	5	12
Infratest dimap	8–9 Jun 2020	1,001	37	20	7	7	20	4	5	17
Infratest dimap	14–16 Apr 2020	1,003	40	19	7	6	20	4	4	20
Forsa	6–8 Apr 2020	1,084	39	20	8	6	15	6	6	19
Infratest dimap	24–29 Oct 2019	1,001	32	20	8	7	23	6	4	9
Mentefactum	14–21 Oct 2019	1,003	31	20	10	10	21	5	4	10
Forsa	1–16 Aug 2019	1,505	29	18	11	7	24	5	6	5
2019 EP election	26 May 2019	–	27.9	19.2	6.7	8.5	23.2	4.2	10.3	5.7
Infratest dimap	19–21 Feb 2019	1,001	30	23	12	9	17	6	3	7
Mentefactum	19–21 Nov 2018	1,004	28	19	11	11	19	8	5	9
Infratest dimap	4–6 Oct 2018	1,000	28	21	11	12	17	8	3	7
YouGov	6–12 Sep 2018	1,049	31	24	10	13	10	7	5	7
Infratest dimap	7–8 May 2018	1,002	35	22	9	12	12	7	3	13
Forsa	8–22 Feb 2018	1,015	34	24	12	7	10	7	6	10
Infratest dimap	9–11 Jan 2018	1,002	34	28	10	9	9	7	3	6
2017 federal election	24 Sep 2017	–	32.6	26.0	13.1	9.4	7.6	7.5	3.8	6.6
YouGov	1–8 Sep 2017	1,048	35	30	9	9	6	8	3	5
Infratest dimap	29–31 Aug 2017	1,000	33	30	13	8	6	6	4	3
2017 state election	14 May 2017	–	33.0	31.2	12.6	7.4	6.4	4.9	4.7	1.8

== Results ==
Party	Constituency			List			Total seats	+/–
Party	Votes	%	Seats	Votes	%	Swing	Total seats	+/–
Christian Democratic Union of Germany (CDU)	2,607,596	36.6	76	2,552,276	35.7	▲2.8	76	▲4
Social Democratic Party of Germany (SPD)	2,092,933	29.4	45	1,905,002	26.7	▼4.6	56	▼13
Alliance 90/The Greens (GRÜNE)	1,269,804	17.8	7	1,299,821	18.2	▲11.8	39	▲25
Free Democratic Party (FDP)	390,062	5.5	0	418,460	5.9	▼6.7	12	▼16
Alternative for Germany (AfD)	368,271	5.2	0	388,768	5.4	▼1.9	12	▼4
The Left (DIE LINKE)	162,005	2.3	0	146,634	2.1	▼2.8	0	±0
Die PARTEI	82,699	1.2	0	76,006	1.1	▲0.4	0	±0
Human Environment Animal Protection Party (Tierschutzpartei)	7,488	0.1	0	75,811	1.1	New	0	New
Grassroots Democratic Party of Germany (dieBasis)	55,292	0.8	0	60,084	0.8	New	0	New
Free Voters (FW)	34,886	0.5	0	49,985	0.7	▲0.3	0	±0
Volt Germany (Volt)	27,784	0.4	0	45,177	0.6	New	0	New
Pirate Party Germany (Piraten)	4,501	0.1	0	19,248	0.3	▼0.7	0	±0
Team Todenhöfer	3,533	0.0	0	14,799	0.2	New	0	New
Family Party of Germany (FAMILIE)	1,462	0.0	0	14,684	0.2	▲0.2	0	±0
Ecological Democratic Party (ÖDP)	–	–	–	9,664	0.1	0.0	0	±0
European Party Love (LIEBE)	739	0.0	0	8,235	0.1	New	0	New
The Humanists (Die Humanisten)	280	0.0	0	8,211	0.1	New	0	New
Party for Health Research (Gesundheitsforschung)	–	–	–	6,833	0.1	0.0	0	±0
Party of Progress (PdF)	–	–	–	6,154	0.1	New	0	New
Democracy by Referendum (Volksabstimmung)	1,038	0.0	0	5,606	0.1	0.0	0	±0
The Urbans. A HipHop Party (Die Urbane)	399	0.0	0	5,201	0.1	New	0	New
Alliance for Innovation and Justice (BIG)	–	–	–	4,222	0.1	▼0.1	0	±0
Centre Party (ZENTRUM)	1,067	0.0	0	4,162	0.1	0.0	0	±0
German Sports Party (DSP)	–	–	–	3,839	0.1	New	0	New
Marxist–Leninist Party of Germany (MLPD)	3,544	0.0	0	3,354	0.0	▼0.1	0	±0
German Communist Party (DKP)	1,681	0.0	0	3,049	0.0	0.0	0	±0
The Violets (VIOLETTEN)	631	0.0	0	2,990	0.0	▼0.1	0	±0
neo. Wellbeing for all (neo)	–	–	–	2,192	0.0	New	0	New
Alliance C – Christians for Germany (Bündnis C)	476	0.0	0	–	–	–	0	New
The Independents (UNABHÄNGIGE)	389	0.0	0	–	–	–	0	New
Liberal Democrats (LD)	185	0.0	0	–	–	–	0	±0
Human World (MENSCHLICHE WELT)	158	0.0	0	–	–	–	0	New
Ecological Left (ÖkoLinX)	134	0.0	0	–	–	–	0	New
Modern Social Party (MSP)	85	0.0	0	–	–	–	0	New
Independents	11,435	0.2	0	–	–	–	0	±0
Valid	7,130,557	99.0		7,146,831	99.3			
Invalid	69,736	1.0		53,462	0.7			
Total	7,200,293	100.0	128	7,200,293	100.0		195	–4
Registered voters/turnout	12,965,858	55.5		12,965,858	55.5	▼9.6		
Source: State Returning Officer

CDU vote

AfD vote

Linke vote

SPD vote

Green vote

FDP vote

== Analysis ==
The results of the election were widely interpreted in the German press as a rebuke of German chancellor Olaf Scholz's and the SPD's response to the 2022 Russian invasion of Ukraine. In the initial days after the Russian invasion, Scholz promised greater military spending and aid to Ukraine but in the following months was seen as indecisive about exporting heavy weapons to Ukraine. Germany has also been less willing than other European nations to boycott Russian energy imports. North Rhine-Westphalia is located in the industrial heartland of Germany and has traditionally been the base of support for the SPD. The Greens largely benefited from the collapse in support for the SPD, as many of their policies on Ukraine are more popular with the German public.

The FDP's result was interpreted as coming from their federal ministers enjoying far less popularity than those of the Greens, popular Christian Lindner not running again, and many 2017 FDP voters migrating to the CDU to prevent Kutschaty from becoming Minister-President.

== Government formation ==
Since the incumbent coalition of the CDU and FDP lost its majority in the election, the formation of a new government was necessary. The Greens were considered to hold the balance of power, able to enter into coalition either with the CDU or with the SPD and FDP. They held separate talks with the CDU and SPD. The FDP declined to participate, believing a CDU–Green government was inevitable. The Greens continued exploratory talks with the CDU and began formal coalition negotiations on 31 May. In a draft agreement, the two sides proposed transitioning North Rhine-Westphalia to climate neutrality, phasing out coal by 2030, and building 1,000 additional wind turbines over five years. They also agreed to hire 10,000 additional teachers and ensure equal pay for teachers regardless of the type of school they are employed in. On 10 June, the two parties announced plans to finalise and approve a coalition agreement by 25 June, with Wüst to be re-elected as Minister-President on 28 June.

The CDU and Greens presented their coalition agreement on 23 June, committing to the policies laid out in the previous draft paper, as well as growing police hires from 2,700 to 3,000, expanding public transport by aiming for a 60% increase in the number of buses and trains by 2030, and mandating the installation of solar energy systems in new private constructions from 2025. They also agreed to phase out regulations banning wind turbines from being built within 1,000 metres of residences. The cabinet would comprise the Minister-President, seven CDU ministers, and four Greens. The coalition agreement was approved near-unanimously by a CDU conference on 25 June. The same day, it passed the Greens congress with 85%. There were objections from members who criticised the proposed separation of the agriculture portfolio from the environment ministry. The state Green Youth rejected the prospect of coalition with the CDU outright, stating they could not sufficiently address pressing issues such as climate change, affordability, and rent and housing.

Wüst was re-elected as Minister-President by the Landtag on 28 June, winning 106 votes out of 180 cast, plus one abstention. Fourteen deputies were absent, including four from the CDU and one from the Greens.
